= Jerry Lee Lewis discography =

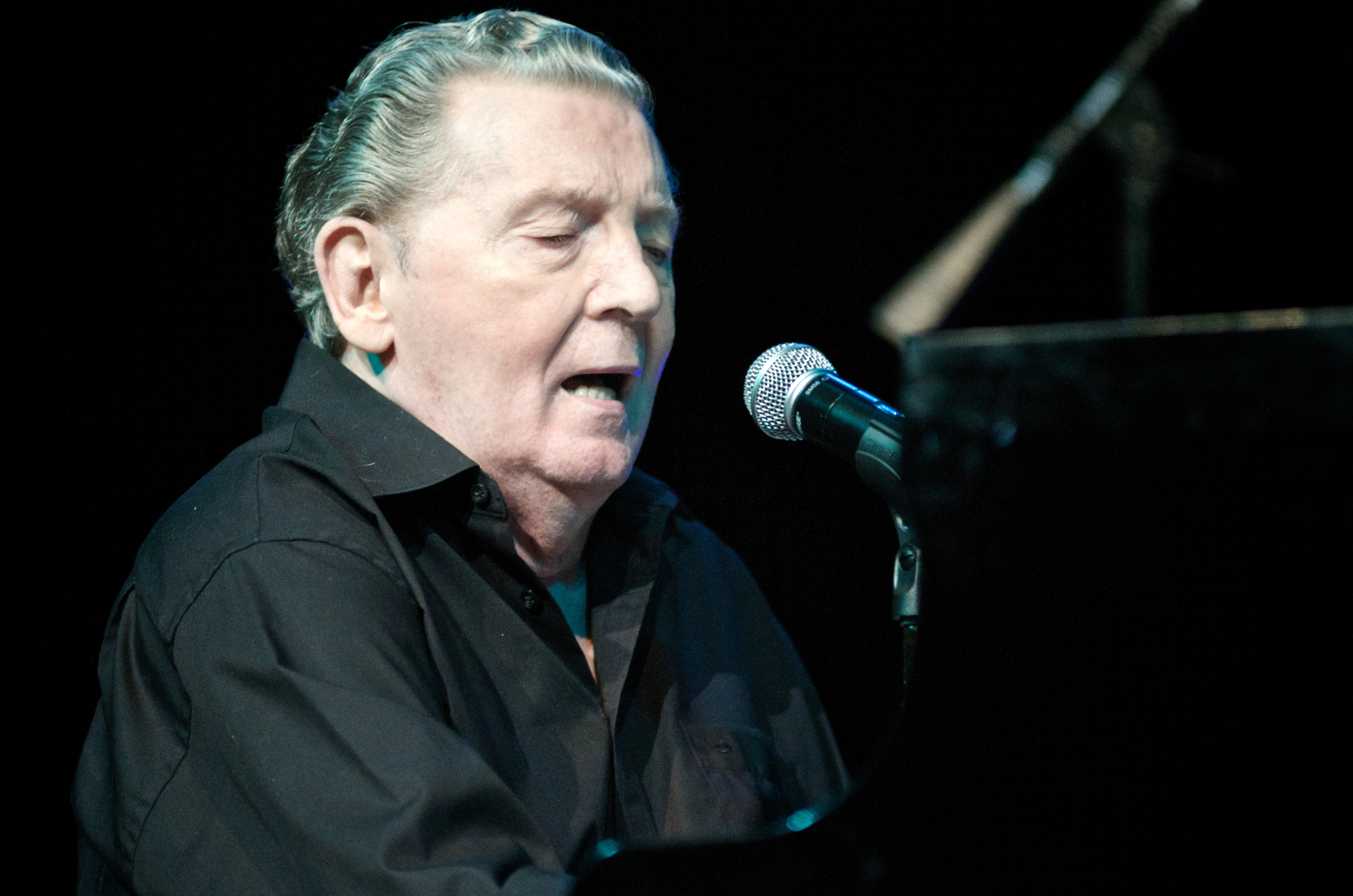
- Studio albums: 40
- Live albums: 4
- Compilation albums: 10
- Singles: 77
- No. 1 Single: 12

This is a detailed discography for American rock and roll, country, and gospel singer-songwriter Jerry Lee Lewis (1935–2022). One of the pioneers of rockabilly, Lewis recorded over 40 albums in a career spanning seven decades. Lewis was a versatile artist, and recorded songs in multiple genres. Lewis, in 1986, was one of the first inductees into the Rock and Roll Hall of Fame, and was the last surviving rock and roll pioneer of Sun Records. Some of his best known songs are "Great Balls of Fire", "Whole Lotta Shakin' Goin' On", and "High School Confidential". His album, Live at the Star Club, Hamburg, is widely considered one of the greatest live concert albums ever. In his lengthy career in music, Lewis had 30 songs reach the top ten on the "Billboard Country-and-Western" chart. Lewis was regarded as one of the greatest and most influential pianists of the rock and roll era, and was ranked number 24 on Rolling Stone magazine's list of the "100 Greatest Artists of All Time".

== Albums ==
=== Studio albums ===
Title	Album details	Chart positions				
Title	Album details	US	US Country	CAN	AUS	UK
Jerry Lee Lewis	Released: March 1958; Label: Sun	—	—	—	—	—
Jerry Lee's Greatest!	Released: December 1961; Label: Sun	—	—	—	—	12
Golden Hits of Jerry Lee Lewis (re-recordings)	Released: c. January 1964; Label: Smash	40	—	—	—	—
The Return of Rock	Released: 1965; Label: Smash	64	—	—	—	—
Country Songs for City Folks/All Country	Released: 1965; Label: Smash	—	39	—	—	—
Memphis Beat	Released: 1966; Label: Smash	145	—	—	—	—
Soul My Way	Released: 1967; Label: Smash	—	—	—	—	—
Another Place, Another Time	Released: 1968; Label: Smash	160	3	—	—	—
She Still Comes Around	Released: 1969; Label: Smash	—	12	—	—	—
Sings the Country Music Hall of Fame Hits, Vol. 1	Released: 1969; Label: Smash	127	2	—	—	—
Sings the Country Music Hall of Fame Hits, Vol. 2	Released: 1969; Label: Smash	124	5	—	—	—
The Golden Cream of the Country	Released: 1969; Label: Sun	—	11	—	—	—
She Even Woke Me Up to Say Goodbye	Released: 1970; Label: Mercury	186	9	—	—	—
In Loving Memories: The Jerry Lee Lewis Gospel Album	Released: 1971; Label: Mercury	213	18	—	—	—
There Must Be More to Love Than This	Released: 1971; Label: Mercury	190	8	—	—	—
Touching Home	Released: 1971; Label: Mercury	152	11	—	—	—
Would You Take Another Chance on Me?	Released: 1971; Label: Mercury	115	3	—	—	—
The Killer Rocks On	Released: 1972; Label: Mercury	105	4	—	30	—
Who's Gonna Play This Old Piano?	Released: 1972; Label: Mercury	201	3	—	—	—
The Session	Released: 1973; Label: Mercury	37	4	12	36	—
Sometimes a Memory Ain't Enough	Released: 1973; Label: Mercury	—	6	—	—	—
Southern Roots: Back Home to Memphis	Released: 1973; Label: Mercury	—	6	—	—	—
I-40 Country	Released: 1974; Label: Mercury	—	25	—	—	—
Boogie Woogie Country Man	Released: 1975; Label: Mercury	—	16	—	—	—
Odd Man In	Released: 1975; Label: Mercury	—	33	—	—	—
Country Class	Released: 1976; Label: Mercury	—	18	—	—	—
Country Memories	Released: 1977; Label: Mercury	—	21	—	—	—
Jerry Lee Keeps Rockin'	Released: 1978; Label: Mercury	—	40	—	—	—
Jerry Lee Lewis	Released: 1979; Label: Elektra	186	23	—	—	—
When Two Worlds Collide	Released: 1980; Label: Elektra	—	32	—	—	—
Killer Country	Released: 1980; Label: Elektra	—	35	—	—	—
My Fingers Do the Talkin'	Released: 1983; Label: MCA	—	62	—	—	—
I Am What I Am	Released: 1984; Label: MCA	—	—	—	—	—
Young Blood	Released: 1995; Label: Sire	31	—	—	—	—
Last Man Standing^{A} (duets album)	Released: 2006; Label: Artists First	26	4	34	46	—
Mean Old Man (duets album)	Released: 2010; Label: Verve	30	—	30	—	—
Rock & Roll Time^{B}	Released: 2014; Label: Vanguard	140	27	—	—	—

- ^{A}Last Man Standing peaked at No. 6 on the Americana Radio Pop Chart, No. 9 on the CIMS Pop Chart, No. 8 on the Billboard Rock Chart and No. 1 on Billboard's Independent Albums chart.
- ^{B}Rock & Toll Time peaked at No. 33 on the Billboard Rock Chart and No. 30 on Billboard's Independent Albums chart.

=== Live albums ===
Title	Album details	Chart positions	
Title	Album details	US	US Country
Live at the Star Club, Hamburg	Released: 1964; Label: Philips	—	—
The Greatest Live Show on Earth	Released: 1964; Label: Smash	32	—
By Request: More of the Greatest Live Show on Earth	Released: 1966; Label: Smash	—	—
Live at the International, Las Vegas	Released: 1970; Label: Mercury	149	5
Live at Gilley's	Released: 1999; Label: Atlantic	—	—
Last Man Standing Live	Released: 2007; Label: Artists First	—	—
Live from Austin, TX (DVD & CD)	Released: 2007; Label: New West	—	—
Jerry Lee Lewis: Live at Third Man Records	Released: 2011; Label: Third Man	—	—

=== Collaboration albums ===
Title	Album details	Chart positions		
Title	Album details	US	US Country	AUS
Together (with Linda Gail Lewis)	Released: 1969; Label: Smash	—	8	—
Duets: Jerry Lee Lewis and Friends (with Jimmy "Orion" Ellis and Charlie Rich)	Released: 1978; Label: Sun	—	—	93
The Million Dollar Quartet (with Elvis Presley, Johnny Cash, Carl Perkins)	Released: 1981; Label: Charly	—	—	—
The Survivors Live (with Johnny Cash, Carl Perkins)	Released: 1982; Label: Columbia	—	21	—
Class of '55 (with Roy Orbison, Johnny Cash, Carl Perkins)	Released: 1986; Label: PolyGram	87	15	—
Jimmy Lee & Jerry Lee: The Boys from Ferriday (with Jimmy Swaggart)	Released: 2022; Label: Jim	—	—	—

=== Soundtrack albums ===
Title	Album details
Original Motion Picture Soundtrack: Great Balls of Fire!	Released: 1989; Label: Polydor

=== Compilation albums ===
Title	Album details	Chart positions	
Title	Album details	US	US Country
Original Golden Hits, Vol. 1	Released: 1969; Label: Sun	119	8
Original Golden Hits, Vol. 2	Released: 1969; Label: Sun	122	6
Rockin' Rhythm and Blues	Released: 1969; Label: Sun	—	—
A Taste of Country	Released: 1970; Label: Sun	—	16
Ole Tyme Country Music	Released: 1970; Label: Sun	—	—
The Best of Jerry Lee Lewis	Released: 1970; Label: Smash	114	8
Monsters	Released: 1971; Label: Sun	—	44
Original Golden Hits, Vol. 3	Released: 1971; Label: Sun	—	—
Breathless (High Heel Sneakers + Roll Over Beethoven)	Released: 1974; Label: Pickwick	—	—
The Best of Jerry Lee Lewis, Volume II	Released: 1978; Label: Mercury	—	23
Best of/Vol. 3	Released: 1981; Label: Philips	—	49
The Best of Jerry Lee Lewis Featuring 39 and Holding	Released: 1982; Label: Elektra	—	39
Jerry Lee Lewis – 18 Original Sun Greatest Hits	Released: 1989; Label: Rhino	—	—
All Killer, No Filler: The Anthology	Released: 1993; Label: Rhino	—	—
Whole Lotta Shakin' Goin' On	Released: 1994; Label: Prima	62	—
Great Balls of Fire and Other Hits	Released: 1998; Label: Rhino	—	—
A Half-Century of Hits (box set)	Released: 2006; Label: Rhino	—	—
Sun Recordings: Greatest Hits	Released: 2012; Label: Time Life	—	71
A Whole Lotta...Jerry Lee Lewis: The Definitive Retrospective	Released: 2012; Label: Salvo	—	—
The Essential Jerry Lee Lewis (The Sun Sessions)	Released: 2013; Label: Legacy	—	—
Lost Christmas: Holiday Rarities (Various Artists)	Released: 2014; Label: Capitol	—	—

== Singles ==
=== 1950s ===
Year	Single (A-side, B-side) Both sides from same album except where indicated	Single details	Peak chart positions					Certifications	Album
Year	Single (A-side, B-side) Both sides from same album except where indicated	Single details	US	US Country	US R&B	UK	BEL	Certifications	Album
1956	"Crazy Arms" b/w "End of the Road" (from Original Golden Hits - Volume 1)	December 1956; Sun Records	—	—	—	—	—		Jerry Lee Lewis
1957	"Whole Lot of Shakin' Goin' On" b/w "It'll Be Me" (alt. from Jerry Lee Lewis)	April 1957; Sun Records	3	1	1	8	13		non-album track/Original Golden Hits – Volume 1
1957	"Great Balls of Fire" /	November 1957; Sun Records	2	1	1	1	16	RMNZ: Gold	Jerry Lee's Greatest!
1957	"You Win Again"	November 1957; Sun Records	95	4	—	—	—		non-album tracks/Original Golden Hits – Volume 1
1958	"Breathless" b/w "Down the Line"	February 1958; Sun Records	7	4	3	8	—		non-album tracks/Original Golden Hits – Volume 1
1958	"High School Confidential" /	May 1958; Sun Records	21	9	5	12	—		Jerry Lee Lewis
1958	"Fools like Me"	May 1958; Sun Records	—	—	11	—	—		Jerry Lee Lewis
1958	"Lewis Boogie" b/w "The Return of Jerry Lee"	June 1958; Sun Records	—	—	—	—	—		non-album tracks/18 Original Sun Greatest Hits
1958	"Break-Up" /	August 1958; Sun Records	52	—	—	—	—		Jerry Lee's Greatest!
1958	"I'll Make It All Up to You"	August 1958; Sun Records	85	19	—	—	—		non-album tracks/Original Golden Hits – Volume 2
1958	"I'll Sail My Ship Alone" b/w "It Hurt Me So"	November 1958; Sun Records	93	—	—	—	—		non-album tracks/Original Golden Hits – Volume 2
1959	"Lovin' Up a Storm"^{A} b/w "Big Blon' Baby"	February 1959; Sun Records	—	—	—	28	—		non-album tracks
1959	"Let's Talk About Us" b/w "The Ballad of Billy Joe" (non-album track)	June 1959; Sun Records	—	—	—	—	—		Jerry Lee's Greatest!
1959	"Little Queenie" b/w "I Could Never Be Ashamed of You" (from Original Golden Hits – Volume 2)	September 1959; Sun Records	—	—	—	—	—		non-album track/Original Golden Hits – Volume 1
"—" denotes releases that did not chart

=== 1960s ===
Year	Single (A-side, B-side) Both sides from same album except where indicated	Single details	Peak chart positions				Album
Year	Single (A-side, B-side) Both sides from same album except where indicated	Single details	US	US Country	CAN Country	UK	Album
1960	"Baby Baby Bye Bye" b/w "Old Black Joe" (non-album track; later appeared on Ole Tyme Country Music)	March 1960; Sun Records	—	—	—	47	non-album track
1960	"John Henry" b/w "Hang Up My Rock and Roll Shoes" (non-album track; later appeared on Rockin' Rhythm and Blues)	August 1960; Sun Records	—	—	—	—	non-album track/Ole Tyme Country Music
1960	"When I Get Paid" b/w "Love Made a Fool of Me"	November 1960; Sun Records	—	—	—	—	non-album tracks
1961	"What'd I Say" (Note: "What'd I Say" also peaked at number 30 on the U.S. Billboard Hot R&B Sides chart.) b/w "Livin' Lovin' Wreck" (non-album track)	February–March 1961; Sun Records	30	27	—	10	Jerry Lee's Greatest!
1961	"Cold, Cold Heart" b/w "It Won't Happen with Me" (non-album track)	May 1961; Sun Records	—	22	—	—	Jerry Lee's Greatest!
1961	"Save the Last Dance for Me" b/w "As Long As I Live" (from Jerry Lee's Greatest!)	September 1961; Sun Records	—	—	—	—	non-album track/Original Golden Hits – Volume 2
1961	"Money" b/w "Bonnie B" (non-album track)	November 1961; Sun Records	—	—	—	—	Jerry Lee's Greatest!
1962	"I've Been Twistin'" b/w "Ramblin' Rose" (later appeared on The Golden Cream of the Country)	January 1962; Sun Records	—	—	—	—	non-album tracks
1962	"Sweet Little Sixteen" b/w "How's My Ex Treating You" (non-album track, later appeared on Original Golden Hits – Volume 2)	July 1962; Sun Records	95	—	—	38	non-album track/Rockin' Rhythm and Blues
1962	"Good Golly Miss Molly" b/w "I Can't Trust Me (in Your Arms Anymore)" (non-album track; later appeared on The Golden Cream of the Country)	November 1962; Sun Records	—	—	—	31	non-album track/Rockin' Rhythm and Blues
1963	"Teenage Letter" b/w "Seasons of My Heart" (non-album track with Linda Gail Lewis; later appeared on The Golden Cream of the Country)	April 1963; Sun Records	—	—	—	—	non-album tracks
1963	"Pen and Paper" b/w "Hit the Road Jack"	November 1963; Smash Records	—	36	—	—	non-album tracks
1964	"I'm on Fire" b/w "Bread and Butter Man"	Smash Records	98	—	—	—	non-album tracks
1964	"She Was My Baby (He Was My Friend)" b/w "The Hole He Said He'd Dig for Me"	Smash Records	—	—	—	—	non-album tracks
1964	"Hi Heel Sneakers" (live) b/w "You Went Back on Your Word" (from The Return of Rock)	Smash Records	91	—	—	—	The Greatest Live Show on Earth
1965	"Green Green Grass of Home" b/w "Baby (You Got What It Takes)" (With Linda Gayle Lewis, non-album track)		—	—	—	—	Country Songs for City Folks
1965	"Carry Me Back to Old Virginia" b/w "I Know What It Means" (Non-album track)	Sun Records	—	—	—	—	Ole Tyme Country Music
1965	"Baby, Hold Me Close" b/w "I Believe in You"		129	—	—	—	The Return of Rock
1966	"Sticks and Stones" b/w "What a Heck of a Mess" (Non-album track)		—	—	—	—	Memphis Beat
1966	"Memphis Beat" b/w "If I Had It All to Do Over" (Non-album track)		—	—	—	—	Memphis Beat
1967	"It's a Hang Up Baby" b/w "Holdin' On"		—	—	—	—	Soul My Way
1967	"Turn On Your Love Light" b/w "Shotgun Man"		—	—	—	—	Soul My Way
1968	"Another Place, Another Time" (Note: "Another Place, Another Time" also peaked at number 73 on the RPM Top Singles chart in Canada.) b/w "Walking the Floor over You"		97	4	—	—	Another Place, Another Time
1968	"What's Made Milwaukee Famous (Has Made a Loser Out of Me)" b/w "All the Good Is Gone"		94	2	1	—	Another Place, Another Time
1968	"She Still Comes Around (to Love What's Left of Me)" b/w "Slipping Around" (from The Best of Jerry Lee Lewis)		—	2	2	—	She Still Comes Around
1968	"To Make Love Sweeter for You" b/w "Let's Talk About Us"		—	1	4	—	She Still Comes Around
1969	"One Has My Name (The Other Has My Heart)" b/w "I Can't Stop Loving You"		—	3	1	—	The Country Music Hall of Fame Hits, Vol. 2
1969	"Invitation to Your Party" b/w "I Could Never Be Ashamed of You" (from Original Golden Hits – Volume 2)	Sun Records	—	6	1	—	The Golden Cream of the Country
1969	"She Even Woke Me Up to Say Goodbye" b/w "Echoes" (from She Still Comes Around)		—	2	1	—	She Even Woke Me Up to Say Goodbye
1969	"One Minute Past Eternity" b/w "Frankie and Johnny"	Sun Records	—	2	2	—	The Golden Cream of the Country
"—" denotes releases that did not chart

=== 1970s ===
Year	Single (A-side, B-side) Both sides from same album except where indicated	Peak chart positions				Album
Year	Single (A-side, B-side) Both sides from same album except where indicated	US	US Country	CAN	CAN Country	Album
1970	"There Must Be More to Love Than This" b/w "Home Away from Home"	—	1	—	1	There Must Be More to Love Than This
1970	"Once More with Feeling" b/w "You Went Out of Your Way (to Walk on Me)"	—	2	—	17	She Even Woke Me Up to Say Goodbye
1970	"I Can't Seem to Say Goodbye" b/w "Good Night Irene"	—	7	—	4	A Taste of Country
1970	"Waiting for a Train" b/w "Big Legged Woman" (from Rockin' Rhythm and Blues)	—	11	—	18	Ole Tyme Country Music
1970	"In Loving Memories" b/w "I Can't Have a Merry Christmas, Mary (Without You)" (non-album track)	—	48	—	—	In Loving Memories
1971	"Touching Home" b/w "Woman, Woman (Get Out of Our Way)" (from There Must Be More to Love Than This)	—	3	—	4	Touching Home
1971	"Love on Broadway" b/w "Matchbox" (from Monsters)	—	31	—	—	Original Golden Hits – Volume III
1971	"When He Walks on You (Like You Have Walked on Me)" b/w "Foolish Kind of Man"	—	11	—	1	Touching Home
1971	"Me and Bobby McGee" /	40	flip	50	—	Would You Take Another Chance on Me
1971	"Would You Take Another Chance on Me"	—	1	—	2	Would You Take Another Chance on Me
1972	"Chantilly Lace" (Note: "Chantilly Lace" also peaked at number 33 on the UK Singles Chart.)	43	1	59	1	The Killer Rocks On
1972	"Think About It Darlin'"	—	flip	—	19	Who's Gonna Play This Old Piano?
1972	"Lonely Weekends" /	—	11	—	13	The Killer Rocks On
1972	"Turn On Your Love Light"	95	—	—	—	The Killer Rocks On
1972	"Who's Gonna Play This Old Piano?" b/w "No Honky Tonks in Heaven"	—	14	—	6	Who's Gonna Play This Old Piano?
1973	"No More Hanging On" b/w "The Mercy of a Letter"	—	19	—	3	Who's Gonna Play This Old Piano?
1973	"No Headstone on My Grave" b/w "Jack Daniel's (Old No 7)" (non-album track)	—	60	—	86	The Session
1973	"Meat Man" b/w "Just a Little Bit"	—	—	—	—	Southern Roots
1973	"Drinkin' Wine Spo-Dee-O-Dee" "Rock and Roll Medley"	41	20	33	12	The Session
1973	"Sometimes a Memory Ain't Enough" b/w "I Think I Need to Pray"	—	6	—	6	Sometimes a Memory Ain't Enough
1974	"I'm Left, You're Right, She's Gone" b/w "I've Fallen to the Bottom"	—	21	—	23	Sometimes a Memory Ain't Enough
1974	"Tell Tale Signs" b/w "Cold, Cold Morning Light"	—	18	—	8	I-40 Country
1974	"He Can't Fill My Shoes" b/w "Tomorrow's Taking My Baby Away"	—	8	—	4	I-40 Country
1975	"I Can Still Hear the Music in the Restroom" b/w "Remember Me (I'm the Who Loves You)"	—	13	—	20	Boogie Woogie Country Man
1975	"Boogie Woogie Country Man" b/w "I'm Still Jealous of You	—	24	—	—	Boogie Woogie Country Man
1975	"A Damn Good Country Song" b/w "When I Take My Vacation to Heaven"	—	68	—	42	Odd Man In
1976	"Don't Boogie Woogie" b/w "That Kind of Fool"	—	58	—	—	Odd Man In
1976	"Let's Put It Back Together Again" b/w "Jerry Lee's Rock and Roll Revival Show"	—	6	—	14	Country Class
1976	"The Closest Thing to You" b/w "You Belong to Me"	—	27	—	23	Country Class
1977	"Middle Age Crazy" b/w "Georgia on My Mind"	—	4	—	3	Country Memories
1978	"Come On In" b/w "Who's Sorry Now"	—	10	—	44	Country Memories
1978	"I'll Find It Where I Can" b/w "Don't Let the Stars Get in Your Eyes"	—	10	—	—	Jerry Lee Keeps Rockin'
1979	"Save the Last Dance for Me" b/w "Am I to Be the One"	—	26	—	18	Duets
1979	"Cold, Cold Heart" b/w "Hello Josephine"	—	84	—	—	Duets
1979	"Rockin' My Life Away" b/w "I Wish I Was Eighteen Again"	—	18	—	34	Jerry Lee Lewis (Elektra)
1979	"Who Will the Next Fool Be?" b/w "Rita May"	—	20	—	24	Jerry Lee Lewis (Elektra)
"—" denotes releases that did not chart

=== 1980s–2000s ===
Year	Single	Peak chart positions		Album
Year	Single	US Country	CAN Country	Album
1980	"When Two Worlds Collide" b/w "Good News Travels Fast"	11	15	When Two Worlds Collide
1980	"Honky Tonk Stuff" b/w "Rockin' Jerry Lee"	28	48	When Two Worlds Collide
1980	"Somewhere over the Rainbow" b/w "Folsom Prison Blues"	10	18	Killer Country
1981	"Thirty Nine and Holding" b/w "Change Places with Me"	4	6	Killer Country
1982	"I'm So Lonesome I Could Cry" b/w "Pick Me Up on Your Way Down" (from The Country Music Hall of Fame Hits, Volume 2)	43	—	The Country Music Hall of Fame Hits, Volume 1
1982	"I'd Do It All Again" b/w "Who Will Buy the Wine"	52	—	The Best of Jerry Lee Lewis
1982	"My Fingers Do the Talkin'" b/w "Forever Forgiving"	44	41	My Fingers Do the Talkin'
1983	"Come as You Were" b/w "Circumstantial Evidence"	66	—	My Fingers Do the Talkin'
1983	"Why You Been Gone So Long?" b/w "She Sings Amazing Grace"	69	—	My Fingers Do the Talkin'
1984	"I Am What I Am" b/w "That Was the Way It Was Then"	—	—	I Am What I Am
1986	"Get Out Your Big Roll Daddy" b/w "Honky Tonkin' Rock 'n Roll Piano Man"	—	—	Get Out Your Big Roll Daddy
1986	"Sixteen Candles" b/w "Rock and Roll (FAIS-DO-DO)" (with Roy Orbison, Johnny Cash and Carl Perkins)	61	—	Class of '55
1990	"It Was the Whiskey Talkin' (Not Me)" b/w "It Was the Whisky Talkin' (Not Me)" (Rock & Roll version)	—	—	Dick Tracy (soundtrack)
1995	"Goosebumps" b/w "Crown Victoria Custom '51"	—	—	Young Blood
2006	"Pink Cadillac" (with Bruce Springsteen)	—	—	Last Man Standing
2007	"Honky Tonk Woman" (with Kid Rock)	—	—	Last Man Standing
2009	"Mean Old Man"	—	—	Mean Old Man
"—" denotes releases that did not chart

=== Billboard Year-End performances ===
Year	Song	Year-End Position
1957	"Whole Lotta Shakin' Goin' On"	28
1958	"Great Balls of Fire"	36

== Other singles ==
=== Singles from collaboration albums ===
Year	Single	Artist	Peak chart positions		Album
Year	Single	Artist	US Country	CAN Country	Album
1969	"Don't Let Me Cross Over"	Linda Gail Lewis	9	—	Together
1970	"Roll Over Beethoven"	Linda Gail Lewis	71	12	Together
"—" denotes releases that did not chart

=== Guest singles ===
Year	Single	Artist	Peak positions	Album
Year	Single	Artist	US Country	Album
1989	"Never Too Old to Rock 'n' Roll"	Ronnie McDowell	50	I'm Still Missing You
1992	"Great Balls of Fire"	Dorothée	—	Une Histoire d'Amour
"—" denotes releases that did not chart

== Music videos ==
Year	Video	Director
1957	Great Balls of Fire	Roy Lockwood
1958	"High School Confidential"	Jack Arnold
1989	"Great Balls of Fire" (1989 version)	Oley Sassone
1995	"Goosebumps"	Rocky Schenck
2006	"Honky Tonk Woman" (with Kid Rock)	Trey Fanjoy
2006	"Pink Cadillac"	Lucas Vigroux

== Other appearances ==
Year	Song	Album
2010	"Great Balls of Fire" (live version)	The 25th Anniversary Rock & Roll Hall Of Fame Concerts
