= A Whole Lotta...Jerry Lee Lewis: The Definitive Retrospective =

Box set by Jerry Lee Lewis
- Released: April 2, 2012
- Recorded: 1956–1989
- Genre: Rock and roll; rockabilly; country; honky-tonk; blues; gospel
- Length: 4:55:56
- Label: Salvo; Universal

Jerry Lee Lewis chronology
Sun Recordings: Greatest Hits (2012)	A Whole Lotta...Jerry Lee Lewis: The Definitive Retrospective (2012)	Rock & Roll Time (2014)

A Whole Lotta...Jerry Lee Lewis: The Definitive Retrospective is a 4-disc box set by American rock and roll pioneer and country music singer Jerry Lee Lewis. It was released in 2012 by Salvo Records and Universal Music Group. It consists of 106 songs recorded between 1956 and 1989 for the Sun, Smash, Mercury, Elektra, and MCA record labels and contains a 70-page booklet written by rock historian Roger W. Dopson. All tracks were remastered by Tim Turan at Turan Audio.

The set showcases Lewis' versatility as a performer and recording artist, with rock and roll numbers such as "Whole Lotta Shakin' Goin' On" and "Great Balls of Fire", country-western songs such as "Another Place, Another Time" and "What's Made Milwaukee Famous (Has Made a Loser Out of Me)", blues/R&B cuts such as "Big Boss Man" and "Drinkin' Wine Spo-Dee-O-Dee", and gospel tracks such as "Thirteen at the Table" and "Me and Jesus" (the latter a duet with sister Linda Gail Lewis).

== Reception ==
Professional ratings
Review scores
Source	Rating
AllMusic	5/5 stars
Uncut	5/5 stars
Record Collector	5/5 stars

Stephen Thomas Erlewine of AllMusic criticized the relative lack of Sun cuts—only 13 total out of 106 tracks—but felt the collection made up for it by delving deep into Lewis' country music catalogue in the 1960s and 1970s for Smash and Mercury Records. He ultimately concluded it was better and more comprehensive than the 1993 Lewis set All Killer, No Filler: The Anthology.

Cila Warncke of Penny Black Music Magazine wrote: "As a purely musical artefact this four CD compilation, with its hundred-plus tracks, 70-page biographical booklet by rock historian Roger Dopson, and sturdy triple fold box, can rightly claim to be “The Definitive Retrospective”."

AllMusic, Uncut, and Record Collector all gave the set 5-out-of-5 stars.

== Track listing ==
=== Disc one (1956–1967) ===
1. "Crazy Arms" (Ralph Mooney, Charles Seals) – 2:45
2. "Whole Lotta Shakin' Goin' On" (Dave "Curlee" Williams) – 2:54
3. "Great Balls of Fire" (Otis Blackwell, Jack Hammer) – 1:53
4. "You Win Again" (Hank Williams) – 2:57
5. "Breathless" (Blackwell) – 2:44
6. "High School Confidential" (Jerry Lee Lewis, Ron Hargrave) – 2:31
7. "Lewis Boogie" (Lewis) – 2:01
8. "Break-Up (Charlie Rich) – 2:39
9. "I'll Sail My Ship Alone" (Moon Mullican, Henry Bernard, Lois Mann, Henry Thurston) – 2:10
10. "Lovin' Up a Storm (Alyson R. Khent, Luther Dixon) – 1:52
11. "What'd I Say" (Ray Charles) – 2:28
12. "Cold, Cold Heart" (H. Williams) – 3:08
13. "Hit the Road Jack" (Percy Mayfield) – 1:56
14. "Pen and Paper" (Diane Kilroy, Eddie Kilroy) – 2:29
15. "I'm on Fire" (Bob Feldman, Richard Gottehrer, Gerald Goldstein) – 2:24
16. "She Was My Baby (He Was My Friend)" (Joy Byers) – 2:18
17. "High Heel Sneakers" (Tommy Tucker) – 3:42
18. "Just in Time" (Margie Singleton, Leon Ashley) – 2:55
19. "Baby, Hold Me Close" (Lewis, Bob Tubert, Shelby Singleton) – 3:06
20. "I Believe in You" (Frank Brunson) – 2:34
21. "Green, Green Grass of Home" (Claude "Curly" Putman) – 2:41
22. "Baby (You've Got What It Takes)" (duet with Linda Gail Lewis) (Clyde Otis, Murray Stein) – 2:37
23. "Detroit City" (Danny Dill, Mel Tillis) – 2:46
24. "Rockin' Jerry Lee" (Lewis) – 2:41
25. "Memphis Beat" (Milton Addington, Dickey Lee, Allen Reynolds) – 2:50
26. "Big Boss Man" (Luther Dixon, Al Smith) – 2:52
27. "It's a Hang-Up, Baby" (Eddie Reeves) – 2:15
28. "Turn On Your Love Light" (Joseph Wade Scott, Don Robey) – 2:31
29. "Shotgun Man" (Cecil J. Harrelson) – 2:43

=== Disc two (1968–1971) ===
1. "Another Place, Another Time" (Jerry Chesnut) – 2:26
2. "Walking the Floor Over You" (Ernest Tubb) – 2:08
3. "I'm a Lonesome Fugitive" (Liz Anderson, Casey Anderson) – 3:00
4. "What's Made Milwaukee Famous (Has Made a Loser Out of Me) (Glenn Sutton) – 2:36
5. "She Still Comes Around (To Love What's Left of Me)" (Sutton) – 2:29
6. "To Make Love Sweeter for You" (George Morgan) – 2:50
7. "There Stands the Glass" (Russ Hall, Mary Jean Shurtz, Autry Greisham) – 2:36
8. "Don't Let Me Cross Over" (duet with Linda Gail Lewis) (Penny Jay) – 2:57
9. "Jackson" (duet with Linda Gail Lewis) (Billy Edd Wheeler, Jerry Leiber) – 2:22
10. "One Has My Name (The Other Has My Heart)" (Eddie Dean, Lorene Dean, Hal Blair) – 2:39
11. "Invitation to Your Party" (Bill Taylor) – 1:57
12. "Earth Up Above" (duet with Linda Gail Lewis) (Donald Murray) – 2:00
13. "She Even Woke Me Up to Say Goodbye" (Doug Gilmore, Mickey Newbury) – 2:40
14. "One Minute Past Eternity" (Taylor, Stanley Kesler) – 2:05
15. "Roll Over Beethoven" (duet with Linda Gail Lewis) (Chuck Berry) – 2:00
16. "Working Man's Blues" (Merle Haggard) – 2:55
17. "Wine Me Up" (Faron Young, Billy Deaton) – 2:23
18. "Once More with Feeling" (Kris Kristofferson, Shel Silverstein) – 2:25
19. "I Can't Seem to Say Goodbye" (Don Robertson) – 2:35
20. "There Must Be More to Love Than This" (Taylor, Thomas LaVerne) – 2:43
21. "Waiting for a Train" (Jimmie Rodgers) – 1:42
22. "In Loving Memories" (Linda Gail Lewis, Harrelson) – 3:15
23. "Sweet Georgia Brown" (Ben Bernie, Maceo Pinkard, Kenneth Casey) – 2:30
24. "Touching Home" (Dallas Frazier, A.L. "Doodle" Owens) – 2:38
25. "When He Walks on You (Like You Have Walked on Me)" (Frazier, Owens) – 2:31
26. "Would You Take Another Chance on Me" (Jerry Foster, Bill Rice) – 2:52
27. "Me and Bobby McGee" (Kristofferson, Fred Foster) – 3:12
28. "Thirteen at the Table" (Buddy Emmons) – 3:36

=== Disc three (1972–1975) ===
1. "Chantilly Lace" (J.P. "The Big Bopper" Richardson) – 2:50
2. "Think About It Darlin' (Foster, Rice) – 2:34
3. "Walk a Mile in My Shoes" (Joe South) – 3:03
4. "Lonely Weekends" (Rich) – 1:44
5. "Me and Jesus" (duet with Linda Gail Lewis) (Tom T. Hall) – 2:39
6. "Who's Gonna Play This Old Piano" (Ray Griff) – 3:18
7. "No Honky-Tonks in Heaven" (Taylor, LaVerne) – 2:29
8. "No Traffic Out of Abilene" (Woodrow Webb) – 2:45
9. "No More Hanging On" (Chesnut) – 3:13
10. "Drinkin' Wine Spo-Dee-O-Dee" (Sticks McGhee, J. Mayo Williams) – 3:39
11. "Bad Moon Rising" (John Fogerty) – 2:39
12. "Juke Box" (Albert Lee, Chas Hodges, Ray Smith, Tony Colton) – 4:41
13. "(Don't Put) No Headstone on My Grave" (Rich) – 5:23
14. "Sometimes a Memory Ain't Enough" (Stan Kesler) – 2:56
15. "Ride Me Down Easy" (Billy Joe Shaver) – 2:48
16. "I'm Left, You're Right, She's Gone" (Taylor, Kesler) – 2:20
17. "Just a Little Bit" (Rosco Gordon) – 3:09
18. "Big Blue Diamonds" (Earl J. Carson) – 4:21
19. "Tell Tale Signs" (Alex Zanetis) – 2:27
20. "He Can't Fill My Shoes" (Frank Dycus, Larry Kingston) – 2:33
21. "Honey Hush" (Big Joe Turner) – 2:16
22. "I Can Still Hear the Music in the Restroom" (Hall) – 2:31
23. "House of Blue Lights" (Don Raye, Freddie Slack) – 2:19
24. "Boogie-Woogie Country Man" (Troy Seals) – 3:42
25. "A Damn Good Country Song" (Donnie Fritts) – 2:06

=== Disc four (1975–1989) ===
1. "Don't Boogie-Woogie (When You Say Your Prayers Tonight)" (Layng Martine Jr.) – 2:36
2. "I Can't Keep My Hands Off You" (Bobby Borchers, Mack Vickery) – 3:14
3. "I Don't Want to Be Lonely Tonight" (Baker Knight) – 3:14
4. "Let's Put It Back Together Again" (Foster, Rice) – 3:19
5. "Jerry Lee's Rock 'n' Roll Revival Show" (Foster, Rice) – 2:51
6. "The Closest Thing to You" (Bob McDill) – 3:15
7. "Middle Age Crazy" (Sonny Throckmorton) – 3:52
8. "Tennessee Saturday Night" (Billy Hughes) – 2:30
9. "Come On In" (Bobby Braddock) – 2:32
10. "I'll Find It Where I Can" (Michael Clark, Zack Van Arsdale) – 2:46
11. "I Hate You" (Leroy Daniels, Dan Penn) – 2:12
12. "Rockin' My Life Away" (Vickery) – 3:26
13. "I Wish I Was Eighteen Again" (Throckmorton) – 3:42
14. "Who Will the Next Fool Be" (Rich) – 5:49
15. "When Two Worlds Collide" (Bill Anderson, Roger Miller) – 2:30
16. "Over the Rainbow" (Harold Arlen, Yip Harburg) – 3:46
17. "Thirty-Nine and Holding" (Foster, Rice) – 2:57
18. "I'm So Lonesome I Could Cry" (H. Williams) – 2:42
19. "My Fingers Do the Talking" (Taylor, Buck Moore) – 2:50
20. "Come As You Were" (Paul Craft) – 2:26
21. "Honky-Tonk Rock 'n' Roll Piano Man" (Steve Collom) – 2:30
22. "Why You Been Gone So Long" (Newbury) – 2:55
23. "Sixteen Candles" (with Johnny Cash, Roy Orbison, and Carl Perkins) (Khent, Dixon) – 3:47
24. "Wild One" (Great Balls of Fire! version) (Johnny O'Keefe, Johnny Greenan, Dave Owens, Tony Withers) – 2:21
