= All Killer, No Filler: The Anthology =

Compilation album by Jerry Lee Lewis
- Released: May 18, 1993
- Genres: Rock; country
- Length: 116:57
- Label: Rhino
- Producers: James Austin, Jack Clement, Tony Colton, Bones Howe, Stan Kesler, Eddie Kilroy, Sigfried Loch, Huey P. Meaux, Sam Phillips, Steve Rowland, Shelby Singleton

Jerry Lee Lewis chronology
Solid Gold (1993)	All Killer, No Filler: The Anthology (1993)	Whole Lotta Shakin Goin On (1994)

Professional ratings
Review scores
Source	Rating
Allmusic	5/5 stars

All Killer, No Filler: The Anthology (also called The Jerry Lee Lewis Anthology: All Killer, No Filler!) is a 1993 box set collecting 42 songs by American musician Jerry Lee Lewis from the mid-1950s to the 1980s, including 27 charting hits. The album has been critically well received. In 2003, Rolling Stone ranked the album at #242 in its list of "Rolling Stone's 500 Greatest Albums of All Time", #245 in the 2012 revised list, and #325 in the 2020 update. Country Music: The Rough Guide indicated that "[t]his is the kind of full-bodied, decades-spanning treatment that Lewis's long, diverse career more than well deserves."

== Track listing ==
=== Disc one ===
1. "Crazy Arms" (Ralph Mooney, Chuck Seals) – 2:44
2. "End of the Road" (Jerry Lee Lewis) – 1:48
3. "It'll Be Me" (Jack Clement) – 2:45
4. "All Night Long" (Don Chapel, Traditional) – 2:03
5. "Whole Lotta Shakin' Goin On" (Sonny David, Dave Williams) – 2:52
6. "You Win Again" (Hank Williams) – 2:55
7. "Great Balls of Fire" (Otis Blackwell, Jack Hammer) – 1:51
8. "Down the Line" (Roy Orbison, Sam Phillips) – 2:13
9. "Breathless" (Blackwell) – 2:42
10. "High School Confidential" (Ron Hargrave, Lewis) – 2:29
11. "Break Up" (Charlie Rich) – 2:38
12. "In the Mood" (Joe Garland, Andy Razaf) – 2:20
13. "I'm on Fire" (Bob Feldman, Jerry Goldstein, Richard Gottehrer) – 2:23
14. "Money (That's What I Want)" (Janie Bradford, Berry Gordy Jr.) – 4:28
15. "Another Place, Another Time" (Jerry Chesnut) – 2:25
16. "What's Made Milwaukee Famous (Has Made a Loser Out of Me)" (Glenn Sutton) – 2:35
17. "She Still Comes Around (To Love What's Left of Me)" (Sutton) – 2:29
18. "To Make Love Sweeter for You" (Jerry Kennedy, Sutton) – 2:49
19. "Don't Let Me Cross Over" (Penny Jay) – 2:58
20. "One Has My Name (The Other Has My Heart)" (Hal Blair, Eddie Dean, Dearest Dean) – 2:38
21. "Invitation to Your Party" (Bill Taylor) – 1:57

=== Disc two ===
1. "She Even Woke Me Up to Say Goodbye" (Doug Gilmore, Mickey Newbury) – 2:39
2. "One Minute Past Eternity" (Stan Kesler, Taylor) – 2:05
3. "I Can't Seem to Say Goodbye" (Don Robertson) – 2:33
4. "Once More With Feeling" (Kris Kristofferson, Shel Silverstein) – 2:24
5. "There Must Be More to Love Than This" (Thomas LaVerne, Taylor) – 2:43
6. "Please Don't Talk About Me When I'm Gone" (Sidney Clare, Sam H. Stept) – 2:24
7. "Touching Home" (Dallas Frazier, A. L. Owens) – 2:36
8. "Would You Take Another Chance on Me" (Jerry Foster, Bill Rice) – 2:51
9. "Chantilly Lace" (J.P. Richardson) – 2:50
10. "No Headstone on My Grave" (Rich) – 5:22
11. "Drinkin' Wine, Spo-Dee-O-Dee" (Stick McGhee, J. Mayo Williams) – 3:38
12. "Sometimes a Memory Ain't Enough" (Kesler) – 2:54
13. "Meat Man" (Mack Vickery) – 2:46
14. "He Can't Fill My Shoes" (Frank Dycus, Larry Kingston) – 2:32
15. "Let's Put It Back Together Again" (Foster, Rice) – 3:18
16. "Middle Age Crazy" (Sonny Throckmorton) – 3:54
17. "Come on In" (Bobby Braddock) – 2:32
18. "I'll Find It Where I Can" (Michael Clark, Zack Vanasdale) – 2:46
19. "Over the Rainbow" (Harold Arlen, E.Y. "Yip" Harburg) – 3:45
20. "Thirty-Nine and Holding" (Foster, Rice) – 2:56
21. "Rockin' My Life Away" (Vickery) – 3:27

== Personnel ==
=== Performance ===
- John Allen – guitar
- Tony Ashton – organ
- Joe Babcock – choir, chorus
- Byron Bach – cello
- John Bahler – choir, chorus
- Brenton Banks – violin
- Stuart Basore – steel guitar
- George Binkley III – violin
- Hal Blaine – percussion, drums
- Harold Bradley – guitar
- Jim Brown – organ
- Albert Wynn Butler – trombone
- Kenneth A. Buttrey – drums
- Paul Cannon – guitar
- Jerry Carrigan – drums
- Fred Carter – guitar
- John Catchings – cello
- Marvin Chantry – viola
- Steve Chapman – acoustic guitar
- Roy Christensen – cello
- Virginia Christensen – violin
- John Christopher, Jr. – guitar
- Jack Clement – bass guitar
- Tony Colton – percussion
- Steve Cropper – guitar
- Dorothy Ann Dillard – choir, chorus
- Donald "Duck" Dunn – bass guitar
- Ned Davis – steel guitar
- Louis Dean Nunley – choir, chorus
- Edward DeBruhl – bass guitar
- Pete Drake – steel guitar
- John Duke – flute, saxophone
- Bobby Dyson – bass guitar
- Ray Edenton – guitar
- Dolores Edgin – choir, chorus
- Harvey "Duke" Faglier – guitar, electric guitar
- Stan Farber – choir, chorus
- Matthew Fisher – percussion
- Solie Fott – violin
- Milton Friedstand – strings
- Linda Gail Lewis – vocals, performer
- Pete Gavin – drums
- Joan Gilbert – strings
- Noel Gilbert – strings
- Carl Gorodetzky – violin
- Lloyd Green – steel guitar
- Jim Haas – choir, chorus
- Lennie Haight – violin
- Jack Hale – trombone
- John Hanken – drums
- Buddy Harman – drums
- Herman Hawkins – bass guitar
- Hoyt Hawkins – choir, chorus
- Ron Hicklin – choir, chorus
- Charles "Chas" Hodges – bass guitar
- Ginger Holladay – choir, chorus
- Mary Holladay – choir, chorus
- Priscilla Ann Hubbard – choir, chorus
- Lillian Hunt – violin
- Jim Isbell – drums
- Al Jackson Jr. – drums
- Wayne Jackson – trumpet
- Roland Janes – bass guitar, guitar, acoustic bass
- Otis Jett – drums
- Kenney Jones – drums
- Martin Katahn – violin
- Thomas "Bunky" Keels – organ, electric piano
- Mike Kellie – drums
- Jerry Kennedy – guitar
- Stan Kesler – bass guitar
- Dave Kirby – electric guitar
- Sheldon Kurland – violin
- Albert Lee – guitar
- Alvin Lee – guitar
- Billy Lee Riley – guitar
- Jerry Lee Lewis – percussion, piano, vocals
- Mike Leech – bass guitar
- Wilfred Lehmann – violin
- Leo Lodner – bass guitar
- Ed Logan – tenor saxophone
- Andrew Love – saxophone
- Kenny Lovelace – acoustic guitar, fiddle, guitar
- Rebecca Lynch – violin
- Neal Matthews – choir, chorus
- Tim May – guitar
- Charlie McCoy – harmonica, vibraphone
- Martha McCrory – cello
- Augie Meyers – organ, Vox organ
- James Mitchell – horn
- Dennis Molchan – violin
- Bob Moore – bass guitar
- Scotty Moore – guitar
- Gene Morford – choir, chorus
- Cam Mullins – conductor
- Weldon Myrick – steel guitar
- Anne Oldham – strings
- Charles Owens – steel guitar
- June Page – choir, chorus
- David "Dave" Parlato – bass guitar
- Brian Parrish – percussion
- Ray Phillips – bass
- William Puett – horn
- Hargus "Pig" Robbins – organ, piano, electric piano
- Stephen Sefsik – clarinet
- Dale Sellers – guitar
- Pete Shannon – guitar
- Jerry Shook – guitar
- Lea Jane Singers – choir, chorus
- Pamela Sixfin – violin
- Ray Smith – acoustic guitar
- Gordon Stoker – choir, chorus
- Bill Strom – organ
- Sugar Sweets – choir, chorus
- Jimmy Tarbutton – guitar
- Morris "Tarp" Tarrant – drums
- William Taylor – trumpet
- Donald Teal – violin
- Samuel Terranova – violin
- Bobby Thompson – acoustic guitar
- James "J.M." Van Eaton – drums
- David Vanderkooi – cello
- Gary VanOsdale – viola
- Mack Vickery – harmonica
- Klaus Voormann – bass guitar
- Herman Wade – guitar
- Ray C. Walker – choir, chorus
- Hurshel Wiginton – leader, choir, chorus
- Anna Williams – choir, chorus
- Stephanie Woolf – violin
- Gary Wright – organ
- William Wright – choir, chorus
- Chip Young – guitar
- Joe Zinkan – bass guitar

=== Production ===
- James Austin – compilation producer
- Jack Clement – producer
- Tony Colton – producer
- Geoff Gans – art direction
- Jimmy Guterman – liner notes
- Bones Howe – producer
- Bill Inglot – remastering
- Jerry Kennedy – producer
- Stan Kesler – producer
- Eddie Kilroy – producer
- Sigfried Loch – producer
- Huey P. Meaux – producer
- Monster X – design
- Ken Perry – remastering
- Sam Phillips – producer
- Steve Rowland – producer
- Showtime Music Archives – photography
- Shelby Singleton – producer
- Billy Strange – string arrangement
- D. Bergen White – string arrangement

=== Contribution unspecified ===
- Stephen Clapp
- Roy Dea
- Millie Kirkham
- Norman Ray
