= Live at the International, Las Vegas =

Live album by Jerry Lee Lewis
- Released: 1970
- Venue: International Hotel Lounge, Las Vegas, Nevada
- Genre: Country
- Label: Mercury
- Producer: Jerry Kennedy

Jerry Lee Lewis chronology
Best of Jerry Lee Lewis (1970)	Live at the International, Las Vegas (1970)	In Loving Memories: The Jerry Lee Lewis Gospel Album (1971)

Professional ratings
Review scores
Source	Rating
Christgau's Record Guide	B

Live at the International, Las Vegas is a live album by American musician and pianist Jerry Lee Lewis that was released on Mercury Records in 1970.

In the 1982 book Hellfire, biographer Nick Tosches reports of an alleged exchange between the two at the time, with Lewis telling Elvis, "You don't know what you're doin'. You're just Colonel Parker's puppet." "Well," Elvis replied, "if I'm so dumb and you're so smart, how is it that I'm playin' the main room and you're playin' the lounge?"

== Track listing ==
1. "She Even Woke Me Up to Say Goodbye" (Doug Gilmore, Mickey Newbury)
2. "Jambalaya" (Hank Williams)
3. "She Still Comes Around (To Love What's Left of Me)" (Glenn Sutton)
4. "Drinking Champagne" (Bill Mack Smith)
5. "San Antonio Rose" (Bob Wills)
6. "Once More with Feeling" (Kris Kristofferson, Shel Silverstein)
7. "When You Wore a Tulip (And I Wore a Big Red Rose)" ** (Jack Mahoney, Percy Wenrich)
8. "Take These Chains from My Heart" * (Hy Heath, Fred Rose)
9. "The Ballad of Forty Dollars" (Tom T. Hall)
10. "Flip, Flop and Fly" (Charles Calhoun, Lou Willie Turner)
11. "You Went Out of Your Way (To Walk on Me)" (Paul Craft)
12. "My Only Claim to Fame" (Glenn Sutton)
13. "Brown Eyed Handsome Man" (Chuck Berry)

== Personnel ==
- Jerry Lee Lewis - vocals, piano
- Linda Gail Lewis - vocals (*solo) (**duet)
- Buck Hutcheson - guitar
- Ned Davis - steel guitar
- Kenny Lovelace - fiddle, guitar
- Eddie DeBruhl - bass
- Morris Tarrant - drums
- Jerry Lee Lewis Jr. - tambourine
