= Best of Jerry Lee Lewis =

Compilation album by Jerry Lee Lewis
- Released: 1970
- Recorded: 1968–1970, Nashville
- Genre: Country
- Label: Smash
- Producer: Jerry Kennedy

Jerry Lee Lewis chronology
She Even Woke Me Up to Say Goodbye (1970)	Best of Jerry Lee Lewis (1970)	Live at the International, Las Vegas (1970)

Professional ratings
Review scores
Source	Rating
Christgau's Record Guide	A−

Best of Jerry Lee Lewis is a compilation album by American musician and pianist Jerry Lee Lewis released on Smash Records in 1970. It features all seven consecutive top-ten country hits Lewis scored between 1968 and 1970, including the number one "To Make Love Sweeter for You". "Slippin' Around" had been previously unavailable. Jim Worbois of AllMusic writes that "these tracks are every bit as exciting, in their own way, as the tracks he cut for Sun. This stuff is killer."

== Track listing ==
1. "What's Made Milwaukee Famous (Has Made a Loser Out of Me)" (Glenn Sutton)
2. "Another Place, Another Time" (Jerry Chesnut)
3. "She Even Woke Me Up to Say Goodbye" (Mickey Newbury, Doug Gilmore)
4. "Louisiana Man" (Doug Kershaw)
5. "Slippin' Around" (Floyd Tillman)
6. "All Then Good Is Gone" (Dottie Bruce, Norro Wilson)
7. "To Make Love Sweeter for You" (Jerry Kennedy, Glenn Sutton)
8. "One Has My Name (The Other Has My Heart)" (Hal Blair, Eddie Dean, Lorene Dean)
9. "She Still Comes Around (To Love What's Left of Me)" (Glenn Sutton)
10. "Once More with Feeling" (Shel Silverstein, Kris Kristofferson)
11. "Let's Talk About Us" (Otis Blackwell)
