= I'll Make It All Up to You =

Song by Jerry Lee Lewis

"Break-Up" / "I'll Make It All Up to You"

Single by Jerry Lee Lewis and His Pumping Piano
- A-side: "Break-Up" "I'll Make It All Up to You"
- Released: August 1958
- Genre: Rock and roll
- Label: Sun
- Songwriter: Charlie Rich
- Producer: Shelby Singleton

Jerry Lee Lewis singles chronology
"Breathless" / "Down the Line" (1958)	"Break-Up" / "I'll Make It All Up to You" (1958)	"I'll Sail My Ship Alone" / "It Hurt Me So" (1958)

"I'll Make It All Up to You" is a song written by Charlie Rich and originally recorded by Jerry Lee Lewis, who released it as a single, with "Break-Up" on the other side, in 1958 on Sun Records. The song would become a #19 Country Hit on the Billboard Country Singles Chart, a #34 hit on the Cash Box Country Singles Chart and a #85 hit on the Billboard Hot 100. Bob Dylan added this song to his live repertoire since May 2025.

== Track listing ==
7" single (Sun 303, 1958)
No.	Title	Length
1.	"Break-Up"	2:33
2.	"I'll Make It All Up To You"	2:59

== Charts ==
Chart (1958)	Peak position
US Billboard Hot 100	85
U.S. Cash Box Country Singles	34
