= The Golden Cream of the Country =

Compilation album by Jerry Lee Lewis
- Released: 1969
- Recorded: Memphis, Tennessee
- Genre: Country
- Length: 26:56
- Label: Sun
- Producer: Shelby Singleton

Jerry Lee Lewis chronology
Rockin' Rhythm and Blues (1969)	The Golden Cream of the Country (1969)	A Taste of Country (1969)

The Golden Cream of the Country is the twelfth studio album by American musician and pianist Jerry Lee Lewis. It was released by the Sun Record Company in 1969. The cuts are masters made in his early years on Sun.

== Track listing ==
No.	Title	Writer(s)	Length
1.	"Invitation to Your Party"	Bill Taylor	1:54
2.	"Jambalaya (On the Bayou)"	Hank Williams	1:58
3.	"Ramblin' Rose"	Marijohn Wilkin; Fred Burch	3:17
4.	"Cold, Cold Heart"	Williams	3:05
5.	"As Long as I Live"	Dorsey Burnette	2:25
6.	"Seasons of My Heart" (with Linda Gail Lewis)	George Jones; Darrell Edwards	2:59
7.	"One Minute Past Eternity"	Taylor; Stan Kesler	2:02
8.	"I Can't Trust Me in Your Arms Anymore"	Vic McAlpin; Tommy Certain	2:11
9.	"Frankie and Johnny"	Traditional (Arranged by Jerry Lee Lewis)	2:32
10.	"Home"	Roger Miller	1:57
11.	"How's My Ex Treating You"	McAlpin	2:36
Total length:			26:56
