= Who's Gonna Play This Old Piano? (song) =

1972 song by Jerry Lee Lewis

Single by Jerry Lee Lewis

from the album Who's Gonna Play This Old Piano?
- B-side: "No Honky Tonks in Heaven"
- Released: December 15, 1972
- Recorded: 1972
- Genre: Jazz; country; rock
- Length: 3:21
- Label: Mercury
- Songwriter(s): Ray Griff
- Producer(s): Jerry Kennedy

Jerry Lee Lewis singles chronology
"Turn On Your Love Light" (1972)	"Who's Gonna Play This Old Piano?" (1972)	"No More Hanging On" (1973)

Who's Gonna Play This Old Piano? is a 1972 song recorded by Jerry Lee Lewis and written by country music songwriter, Ray Griff. Released on Lewis' 1972 album of the same name, the song peaked at #14 on the Billboard Hot Country Singles chart.

== Content ==
The song is about a man who wonders who will continue to play sad songs for his lover on his piano after he dies. The song is unique in that it fuses old-fashioned ragtime, Dixieland jazz and rockabilly elements, in addition to the (then) modern countrypolitan sound.

== Chart performance ==
Chart (1972)	Peak position
US Billboard Hot Country Singles	14
Canadian RPM Country Tracks	6
