= Who's Gonna Play This Old Piano? =

Studio album by Jerry Lee Lewis
- Released: 1972
- Genre: Country
- Length: 33:59
- Label: Mercury
- Producer: Jerry Kennedy

Jerry Lee Lewis chronology
The Killer Rocks On (1972)	Who's Gonna Play This Old Piano? (1972)	The Session (1973)

Who's Gonna Play This Old Piano (Think About It, Darlin') is a studio album by American musician and pianist Jerry Lee Lewis, released on Mercury Records in 1972.

== Track listing ==
No.	Title	Writer(s)	Length
1.	"Who's Gonna Play This Old Piano?"	Ray Griff	3:21
2.	"She's Reachin' for My Mind"	Dallas Frazier; A. L. Owens	2:41
3.	"Too Many Rivers"	Harlan Howard	3:02
4.	"We Both Know Which One of Us Went Wrong"	Frazier; Owens	3:37
5.	"Wall Around Heaven"	Cecil Harrelson; Carmen Holland; Jerry Lee Lewis	3:08
6.	"No More Hanging On"	Jerry Chesnut	3:15
7.	"Think About It, Darlin'"	Jerry Foster; Bill Rice	2:34
8.	"Bottom Dollar"	Doug Finley; Billy Joe Shaver	3:02
9.	"No Traffic Out of Abilene"	Woodrow Webb	2:46
10.	"Parting Is Such Sweet Sorrow"	Linda Gail Lewis; Harrelson	3:01
11.	"The Mercy of a Letter"	Foster; Rice	3:32
Total length:			33:59

== Personnel ==
- Jerry Lee Lewis - vocals, piano
- Chip Young, Dale Sellers, Harold Bradley, Jerry Kennedy, Pete Wade, Ray Edenton - guitar
- Pete Drake - steel guitar
- Kenny Lovelace - fiddle
- Bob Moore - bass
- Bill Strom - organ
- Buddy Harman - drums
- Bob Phillips - trumpet
- Wayne Butler - trombone
- Stephen Sefsik - clarinet
- Carol Montgomery, Dolores Edgin, Hurshel Wiginton, Joe Babcock, Millie Kirkham, Rickie Page, Trish Williams - vocal accompaniment
- Cam Mullins - arrangements
