= A Taste of Country =

Compilation album by Jerry Lee Lewis
- Released: 1969
- Recorded: Memphis, Tennessee
- Genre: Country
- Length: 26:37
- Label: Sun

Jerry Lee Lewis chronology
| The Golden Cream of the Country (1969) | A Taste of Country (1969) | She Even Woke Me Up to Say Goodbye (1970) |

A Taste of Country is a compilation album by American musician and pianist Jerry Lee Lewis, released on Sun Records in 1969.

== Track listing ==
| No. | Title | Writer(s) | Length |
|---|---|---|---|
| 1. | "I Can't Seem to Say Goodbye" | Don Robertson | 2:31 |
| 2. | "I Love You So Much It Hurts" | Floyd Tillman | 2:18 |
| 3. | "I'm Throwing Rice" | Eddy Arnold; Steve Nelson | 2:13 |
| 4. | "Goodnight Irene" | Lead Belly; John A. Lomax | 2:53 |
| 5. | "Your Cheatin' Heart" | Hank Williams | 2:10 |
| 6. | "Am I to Be the One" | Otis Blackwell; B.W. Stevenson | 1:40 |
| 7. | "Crazy Arms" | Ralph Mooney; Chuck Seals | 2:42 |
| 8. | "Night Train to Memphis" | Owen Bradley; Marvin Hughes; Harry Beasley Smith | 2:08 |
| 9. | "As Long As I Live" | Dorsey Burnette | 2:25 |
| 10. | "You Win Again" | Williams | 2:57 |
| 11. | "It Hurt Me So" | Charlie Rich; Bill Justis | 2:40 |
| Total length: | | | 26:37 |
