= Rock & Roll Time =

Studio album by Jerry Lee Lewis
- Released: November 7, 2014
- Recorded: 2012–2014
- Studios: House of Blues Studio, Memphis
- Genre: Rock and roll
- Label: Vanguard Records

Jerry Lee Lewis chronology
A Whole Lotta...Jerry Lee Lewis: The Definitive Retrospective (2012)	Rock & Roll Time (2014)

Rock & Roll Time is the forty-first and final studio album by American rock and roll pioneer Jerry Lee Lewis, released on November 7, 2014, by Vanguard Records. The album featured several big name friends as musicians including Keith Richards, Band guitarist Robbie Robertson, Neil Young and Nils Lofgren. The album peaked at number 33 on Billboard's Top Rock Albums chart and number 30 on Billboard's Independent Albums chart.

== Track listing ==
1. "Rock and Roll Time" (Kris Kristofferson, Roger McGuinn, Bob Neuwirth)
2. "Little Queenie" (Chuck Berry)
3. "Stepchild" (Bob Dylan)
4. "Sick and Tired" (Chris Kenner, Dave Bartholomew)
5. "Bright Lights, Big City" (Jimmy Reed)
6. "Folsom Prison Blues" (Johnny Cash)
7. "Keep Me in Mind" (previously unpublished song by Mack Vickery)
8. "Mississippi Kid" (Al Kooper, Bob Burns, Ronnie Van Zant)
9. "Blues Like Midnight" (Jimmie Rodgers)
10. "Here Comes That Rainbow Again" (Kristofferson)
11. "Promised Land" (Berry)

== Critical reception ==
Professional ratings
Review scores
Source	Rating
AllMusic	3.5/5 stars
American Songwriter	4/5 stars
The Guardian	4/5 stars
Rolling Stone	3/5 stars

In a review for AllMusic, Stephen Erlewine ranked the album 3.5 stars out of 5, stating:

"There's a different feel to ... [this album, and co-producers Steve Bing and Jim Keltner] bring the Killer back where he belongs ... Jerry Lee is once again singing some of that old-time rock & roll. It's a back-to-basics move, and to that end, Bing and Keltner made the canny decision to dial back the superstar cameos that threatened to overwhelm Lewis on Last Man Standing and Mean Old Man ... which means the album belongs to nobody but the Killer. He sounds his age, as he should at 79, but he still sounds vibrant, whether he's once again singing Chuck Berry songs he's played countless times before, or laying into Kris Kristofferson's "Rock & Roll Time," Bob Dylan's obscure "Stepchild," or Mack Vickery's "Keep Me in Mind." The emphasis is on greasy groove, an appropriate move considering the Killer's advanced age, but by placing feel first and foremost, it's possible to pay attention to how Lewis' vocal phrasing remains sly and supple. Nobody else can sing like Jerry Lee and it remains a pleasure to hear him sink his teeth into nearly any song, especially when he's supported by a team as sympathetic as he is here."
