= She Even Woke Me Up to Say Goodbye (album) =

Studio album by Jerry Lee Lewis
- Released: 1970
- Studio: Monument Recording, Nashville, Tennessee
- Genre: Country
- Length: 26:51
- Label: Mercury
- Producer: Jerry Kennedy

Jerry Lee Lewis chronology
A Taste of Country (1969)	She Even Woke Me Up to Say Goodbye (1970)	Best of Jerry Lee Lewis (1970)

Singles from She Even Woke Me Up to Say Goodbye
- 1. "She Even Woke Me Up to Say Goodbye" Released: September 1969

She Even Woke Me Up to Say Goodbye is the thirteenth studio album by American musician and pianist Jerry Lee Lewis, released on Mercury Records in 1970.

== Reception ==
She Even Woke Me Up To Say Goodbye was released in January 1970 and rose to number 9 on the Billboard country album charts. Stephen Erlewine of AllMusic calls the album "the fieriest, loosest performances he's given since leaving Sun (not counting, of course, the then-unreleased Star Club live recording), which jolts the hardcore country of Another Place and She Still Comes Around to a different stratosphere. Those were spectacular pure country records by any measure, but this is a spectacular pure Jerry Lee country record, where he's the center of every cut, every performance, and the record is tremendously addictive for it."

== Track listing ==
No.	Title	Writer(s)	Length
1.	"Once More with Feeling"	Kris Kristofferson; Shel Silverstein	2:27
2.	"Workin' Man Blues"	Merle Haggard	2:56
3.	"Waiting for a Train"	Jimmie Rodgers	2:00
4.	"Brown Eyed Handsome Man"	Chuck Berry	2:08
5.	"My Only Claim to Fame"	Glenn Sutton	2:15
6.	"Since I Met You Baby"	Ivory Joe Hunter	2:49
7.	"She Even Woke Me Up to Say Goodbye"	Mickey Newbury; Doug Gilmore	2:40
8.	"Wine Me Up"	Eddie Crandall; Faron Young	2:24
9.	"When the Grass Grows Over Me"	Don Chapel	2:43
10.	"You Went Out of Your Way (To Walk on Me)"	Paul Craft	1:56
11.	"Echoes"	Cecil Harrelson; Linda Gail Lewis	2:33
Total length:			26:51

== Personnel ==
- Jerry Lee Lewis - vocals, piano
- Bob Moore - bass
- Buddy Harman - drums
- Kenny Lovelace - fiddle
- Ray Edenton, Jerry Kennedy, Jerry Shook, Chip Young - guitar
- Hargus "Pig" Robbins - organ
- Ned Davis - steel guitar
