= In Loving Memories: The Jerry Lee Lewis Gospel Album =

Studio album by Jerry Lee Lewis
- Released: 1971
- Recorded: 1970
- Genre: Country gospel
- Label: Mercury
- Producers: Jerry Lee Lewis, Linda Gail Lewis

Jerry Lee Lewis chronology
Live at the International, Las Vegas (1970)	In Loving Memories: The Jerry Lee Lewis Gospel Album (1971)	There Must Be More to Love Than This (1971)

In Loving Memories: The Jerry Lee Lewis Gospel Album is a studio album by American musician and pianist Jerry Lee Lewis, released on Mercury Records in 1971.

It peaked on the US Top Country Albums chart at #18.

== Track listing ==
1. "In Loving Memories" (Linda Gail Lewis, Cecil J. Harrelson) - 3:14
2. "The Lily of the Valley" (Charles Fry, William Shakespeare Hays) - 2:50
3. "Gather 'Round Children" (Linda Gail Lewis, Cecil J. Harrelson) - 3:03
4. "My God's Not Dead" (Thomas La Verne, Donnie Pittman, Bill Taylor) - 1:42
5. "He Looked Beyond My Fault" (Dottie Rambo) - 2:55
6. "The Old Rugged Cross" (George Bennard; arranged by Jerry Lee Lewis) - 2:40
7. "I'll Fly Away" (Albert E. Brumley, Eddie DeBruhl) - 2:45
8. "I'm Longing for Home" (Rev. Rupert Cravens, Orville Davis) - 3:10
9. "I Know That Jesus Will Be There (Cecil Harrelson) - 3:17
10. "Too Much to Gain to Lose" (Dottie Rambo) - 2:35
11. "If We Never Meet Again"/"I'll Meet You in the Morning" (Albert E. Brumley) - 2:50

== Personnel ==
- Jerry Lee Lewis - piano, vocals
- Linda Gail Lewis - duet vocals on "I Know That Jesus Will Be There"
- Buck Hutcheson, Harold Bradley, Ray Edenton - guitar
- Ned Davis - steel guitar
- Kenny Lovelace - fiddle
- Bob Moore, Eddie DeBruhl - bass
- Buddy Harman - drums
- The Nashville Sounds, The Jordanaires - choral backing vocals

Technical

- Desmond Strobel - art direction
- Kerig Pope - album design
