= She Was My Baby (He Was My Friend) =

Song by Jerry Lee Lewis

Single by Jerry Lee Lewis
- B-side: "The Hole He Said He'd Dig for Me"
- Released: 1964
- Genre: Rock and roll
- Label: Smash
- Songwriter: Joy Byers

Jerry Lee Lewis singles chronology
"I'm on Fire" / "Bread and Butter Man" (1964)	"She Was My Baby (He Was My Friend)" / "The Hole He Said He'd Dig for Me" (1964)	"Hi Heel Sneakers" (live) / "You Went Back on Your Word" (1964)

"She Was My Baby (He Was My Friend)" is a song written by Joy Byers and originally recorded by Jerry Lee Lewis, who released it as a single, with "The Hole He Said He'd Dig for Me" on the other side, in 1964 on Smash Records.

== Track listing ==
7" single (Smash S-1906, 1964)
No.	Title	Length
1.	"She Was My Baby (He Was My Friend)"	2:40
2.	"The Hole He Said He'd Dig for Me"	2:16

== Charts ==
Chart (1964)	Peak position
Belgium (Ultratip Bubbling Under Wallonia)	–
