= Pen and Paper (Jerry Lee Lewis song) =

Song by Jerry Lee Lewis

Single by Jerry Lee Lewis
- A-side: "Pen and Paper" "Hit the Road Jack"
- Released: 1964
- Genre: Country
- Label: Smash
- Songwriter(s): Diane Kilroy; Eddie Kilroy

Jerry Lee Lewis singles chronology
"Teen-Age Letter" / "Seasons of My Heart" (1963)	"Pen and Paper" / "Hit the Road Jack" (1963)	"I'm on Fire" / "Bread and Butter Man" (1964)

"Pen and Paper" is a song written by Diane and Eddie Kilroy and originally recorded by Jerry Lee Lewis, who released it as a single, with a cover of "Hit the Road Jack" on the other side, in 1963 on Smash Records.

The song was covered by Faron Young in 1965 and by Mickey Gilley in 1975.

== Track listing ==
7" single (Smash S-1857, 1964)
No.	Title	Length
1.	"Pen and Paper"	2:25
2.	"Hit the Road Jack"	1:55

== Charts ==
Chart (1964)	Peak position
US Hot Country Songs (Billboard)	36
US Cash Box Country Singles	42
