= I'm on Fire (Jerry Lee Lewis song) =

Song by Jerry Lee Lewis

- German release picture sleeve

Single by Jerry Lee Lewis
- A-side: "I'm on Fire" "Bread and Butter Man"
- Released: March 1964
- Genre: Rock and roll
- Label: Smash
- Songwriters: Bob Feldman, Goldstein, Richard Gottehrer

Jerry Lee Lewis singles chronology
"Pen and Paper" / "Hit the Road Jack" (1963)	"I'm on Fire" / "Bread and Butter Man" (1964)	"She Was My Baby (He Was My Friend)" / "The Hole He Said He'd Dig for Me" (1964)

"I'm on Fire" is a song originally recorded by Jerry Lee Lewis, who released it as a single, with "Bread and Butter Man" on the other side, in 1964 on Smash Records.

== Track listing ==
7" single (Smash S-1886, 1964)
No.	Title	Length
1.	"I'm on Fire"	2:22
2.	"Bread and Butter Man"	2:34

== Charts ==
Chart (1964)	Peak position
Belgium (Ultratip Bubbling Under Wallonia)	–
US Billboard Hot 100	98
