= Break-Up (Jerry Lee Lewis song) =

Single by Jerry Lee Lewis

- Dutch release picture sleeve

Single by Jerry Lee Lewis and His Pumping Piano

from the album Jerry Lee's Greatest!
- A-side: "Break-Up" "I'll Make It All Up to You"
- Released: August 1958
- Genre: Rock and roll
- Label: Sun
- Songwriter: Charlie Rich
- Producer: Shelby Singleton

Jerry Lee Lewis singles chronology
"Breathless" / "Down the Line" (1958)	"Break-Up" / "I'll Make It All Up to You" (1958)	"I'll Sail My Ship Alone" / "It Hurt Me So" (1958)

"Break-Up" is a song written by Charlie Rich and originally recorded by Jerry Lee Lewis, who released it as a single, with "I'll Make It All Up to You" on the other side, in 1958 on Sun Records.

== Track listing ==
7" single (Sun 303, 1958)
No.	Title	Length
1.	"Break-Up"	2:33
2.	"I'll Make It All Up To You"	2:59

== Charts ==
Chart (1958–1964)	Peak position
Belgium (Ultratip Bubbling Under Wallonia)	–
US Billboard Hot 100	52
