= I Can't Seem to Say Goodbye =

Single by Jerry Lee Lewis

from the album A Taste of Country
- A-side: "I Can't Seem to Say Goodbye" "Good Night Irene"
- Released: March 4, 1970
- Genre: Country
- Length: 2:30
- Label: Sun
- Songwriter: Don Robertson

Jerry Lee Lewis singles chronology
| "Once More with Feeling" / "You Went Out of Your Way (to Walk on Me)" (1970) | "I Can't Seem to Say Goodbye" / "Good Night Irene" (1970) | "Waiting for a Train" / "Big Legged Woman" (1970) |

"I Can't Seem to Say Goodbye" is a song written by Don Robertson and originally recorded by Jerry Lee Lewis during his time with Sun Records.

The recording didn't see the light of day until 1970, when it was included on the second Jerry Lee Lewis album released by the new owner of Sun Records, Shelby Singleton. (In June 1969, Sun Records founder Sam Phillips sold the entire Sun catalog to Shelby Singleton, which included a treasure trove of unreleased Lewis recordings. With Jerry Lee's rebirth as a country star for Smash Records, Singleton began releasing these older songs and packaged them in such a way that many buyers assumed they were recent recordings.)

The song was also released as a single from that album, reaching number 6 on the Cash Box Country Singles chart and number 7 on the Billboard country chart.

== Track listing ==
7" single (Sun SI-1115, 1970)
| No. | Title | Length |
|---|---|---|
| 1. | "I Can't Seem to Say Goodbye" | 2:30 |
| 2. | "Good Night Irene" | 2:34 |

== Charts ==
| Chart (1970) | Peak position |
|---|---|
| US Cash Box Country Singles | 6 |
| US Hot Country Songs (Billboard) | 7 |

== Other versions ==
Bob Dylan performed a live cover of the song in Nottingham, England on October 28, 2022, the same day that Lewis died. Dylan introduced the song by telling the audience, "I don’t know how many of you know, but Jerry Lee’s gone. We’re gonna play this song, one of his. Jerry Lee will live forever – we all know that".
