= Invitation to Your Party =

Single by Jerry Lee Lewis

from the album The Golden Cream of the Country
- B-side: "I Could Never Be Ashamed of You"
- Released: July 1969
- Genre: Country
- Label: Sun
- Songwriter(s): Bill Taylor

Jerry Lee Lewis singles chronology
"One Has My Name (The Other Has My Heart)" (1969)	"Invitation to Your Party" (1969)	"She Even Woke Me Up to Say Goodbye" (1969)

"Invitation to Your Party" is a single by American country music artist Jerry Lee Lewis. Released in July 1969, it was the first single from his album The Golden Cream of the Country. The song peaked at number 6 on the Billboard Hot Country Singles chart. It also reached number 1 on the RPM Country Tracks chart in Canada.

== Chart performance ==
Chart (1969)	Peak position
U.S. Billboard Hot Country Singles	6
Canadian RPM Country Tracks	1
