= One Minute Past Eternity =

Single by Jerry Lee Lewis

from the album The Golden Cream of the Country
- B-side: "Frankie & Johnny"
- Released: November 1969
- Genre: Country
- Length: 1:56
- Label: Sun
- Songwriter(s): William E. Taylor; Stanley Kesler

Jerry Lee Lewis singles chronology
"She Even Woke Me Up to Say Goodbye" (1969)	"One Minute Past Eternity" (1969)	"Once More with Feeling" (1970)

"One Minute Past Eternity" is a song written by William E. Taylor and Stanley Kesler, and performed by Jerry Lee Lewis. It was released in November 1969 as the second and final single from the album, The Golden Cream of the Country. The song peaked at number 2 on both the U.S. Billboard Hot Country Singles chart and the Canadian RPM Country Tracks chart.

== Chart performance ==
Chart (1969–1970)	Peak position
U.S. Billboard Hot Country Singles	2
Canadian RPM Country Tracks	2
