= Once More with Feeling (song) =

Single by Jerry Lee Lewis

from the album She Even Woke Me Up to Say Goodbye
- A-side: "Once More with Feeling" "You Went Out of Your Way (to Walk on Me)"
- Released: December 1969 or January 1970
- Recorded: 1969
- Genre: Country
- Label: Smash
- Songwriter(s): Kris Kristofferson; Shel Silverstein
- Producer(s): Jerry Kennedy

Jerry Lee Lewis singles chronology
"There Must Be More to Love Than This" / "Home Away from Home" (1970)	"Let's Talk About Us" / "You Went Out of Your Way (to Walk on Me)" (1970)	"I Can't Seem to Say Goodbye" / "Good Night Irene" (1970)

"Once More with Feeling" is a song written by Kris Kristofferson and Shel Silverstein and originally recorded by Jerry Lee Lewis in 1969 for Smash Records. The song was part of Lewis's studio album She Even Woke Me Up to Say Goodbye and was also released as a single (with "You Went Out of Your Way (to Walk on Me)" on the flip side), reaching number 1 on the Cash Box Country Singles chart and number 2 on the Billboard country chart.

== Track listing ==
7" single (Smash S-2257, December 1969 or January 1970)
No.	Title	Length
1.	"Once More with Feeling"
2.	"You Went Out of Your Way (to Walk on Me)"

Notes: "From Smash's album She Even Woke Me Up to Say Goodbye SRS-67128"

== Charts ==
Chart (1970)	Peak position
US Country Singles (Cash Box)	1
US Hot Country Songs (Billboard)	2
