= She Even Woke Me Up to Say Goodbye =

Single by Jerry Lee Lewis

from the album She Even Woke Me Up to Say Goodbye
- B-side: "Echoes"
- Released: September 1969
- Genre: Country
- Length: 2:44
- Label: Smash
- Songwriter(s): Doug Gilmore; Mickey Newbury
- Producer(s): Jerry Kennedy

Jerry Lee Lewis singles chronology
| "Invitation to Your Party" (1969) | "She Even Woke Me Up to Say Goodbye" (1969) | "One Minute Past Eternity" (1969) |

"She Even Woke Me Up to Say Goodbye" is a song written by Doug Gilmore and Mickey Newbury, and recorded by American country music artist Jerry Lee Lewis. Released in September 1969, it was the first single from his album She Even Woke Me Up to Say Goodbye. The song peaked at number 2 on the Billboard Hot Country Singles chart. It also reached number 1 on the RPM Country Tracks chart in Canada.

Newbury's recording of the song was included on his 1969 album Looks Like Rain. Kenny Rogers and The First Edition also recorded the track on their best-selling album Something's Burning.

A cover by Ronnie Milsap peaked at number 15 on the Billboard Hot Country Singles chart in 1975.

== Chart performance ==
=== Jerry Lee Lewis ===
| Chart (1969) | Peak position |
|---|---|
| U.S. Billboard Hot Country Singles | 2 |
| Canadian RPM Country Tracks | 1 |

=== Ronnie Milsap ===
| Chart (1975) | Peak position |
|---|---|
| U.S. Billboard Hot Country Singles | 15 |
