= Jerry Lee Lewis =

American musician (1935–2022)

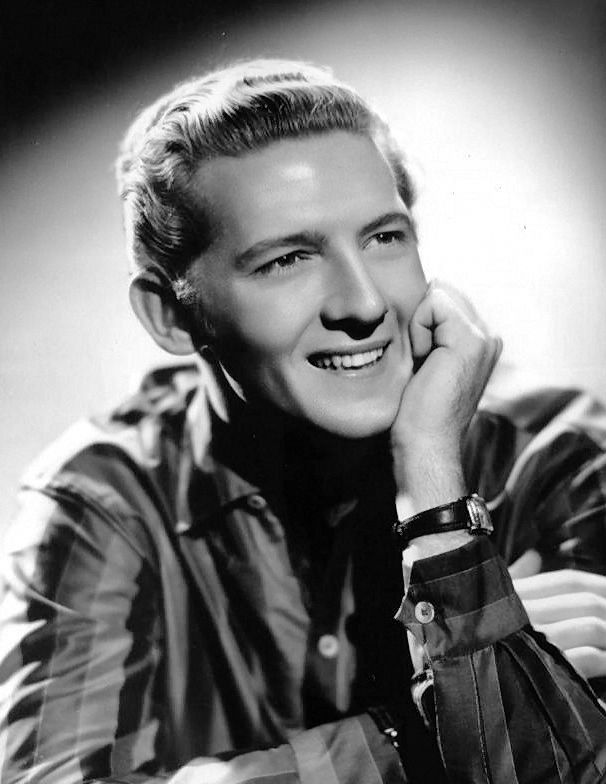
- Publicity photo, 1950s
- Born: September 29, 1935; Ferriday, Louisiana, U.S.
- Died: October 28, 2022 (aged 87); Nesbit, Mississippi, U.S.
- Occupations: Pianist; singer; songwriter
- Years active: 1949–2022
- Spouses: Dorothy Barton (m. 1952; div. 1953) Jane Mitcham (m. 1953; div. 1957) Myra Gale Brown (m. 1957; div. 1970) Jaren Elizabeth Gunn Pate (m. 1971; died 1982) Shawn Stephens (m. 1983; died 1983) Karrie McCarver (m. 1984; div. 2005) Judith Brown (m. 2012)
- Children: 6
- Relatives: Myra Gale Brown (cousin); Linda Gail Lewis (sister); J.W. Brown (cousin/father-in-law); Mickey Gilley (cousin); Carl McVoy (cousin); Jimmy Swaggart (cousin)
- Musical career
- Genres: Rock and roll; rockabilly; country; gospel; honky-tonk; blues; boogie-woogie
- Instruments: Piano; vocals
- Works: Full list
- Labels: Sun; Smash; Mercury; Sire; Warner Bros.; MCA
- Formerly of: Million Dollar Quartet
- Website: jerryleelewis.com

Jerry Lee Lewis (September 29, 1935 – October 28, 2022) was an American country music and rock and roll pianist, singer, and songwriter. Nicknamed "The Killer", he was described as "rock 'n' roll's first great wild man". A pioneer of rock and roll and rockabilly music, Lewis made his first recordings in 1952 at Cosimo Matassa's J&M Studio in New Orleans, Louisiana, and early recordings in 1956 at Sun Records in Memphis, Tennessee. He later became known for his chart topping country music recordings from the 1960s and 1970s. "Crazy Arms" sold 300,000 copies in the Southern United States, but his 1957 hit "Whole Lotta Shakin' Goin' On" shot Lewis to worldwide fame. He followed this with the major hits "Great Balls of Fire", "Breathless", and "High School Confidential".

His rock and roll career faltered in the wake of his marriage to Myra Gale Brown, his 13-year-old cousin. His popularity quickly eroded following the scandal, and with few exceptions, such as a cover of Ray Charles's "What'd I Say", he did not have much chart success in the early 1960s. His live performances at this time were increasingly wild and energetic. His 1964 live album Live at the Star Club, Hamburg is regarded by many music journalists and fans as one of the wildest and greatest live rock albums ever. In 1968, Lewis made a transition into country music, and had hits with songs such as "Another Place, Another Time". This reignited his career, and throughout the late 1960s and 1970s, he regularly topped the country-western charts; throughout his seven-decade career, Lewis had 30 songs reach the top 10 on the Billboard Country and Western Chart. His number-one country hits included "To Make Love Sweeter for You", "There Must Be More to Love Than This", "Would You Take Another Chance on Me", and "Me and Bobby McGee".

Lewis's successes continued throughout the decades, and he embraced his rock and roll past with songs such as a cover of The Big Bopper's "Chantilly Lace" and Mack Vickery's "Rockin' My Life Away". In the 21st century, Lewis continued to tour worldwide and release new albums. His 2006 album Last Man Standing was his best-selling release, with over a million copies worldwide. This was followed by Mean Old Man in 2010, another of his bestselling albums.

Lewis had a dozen gold records in rock and country. He won four Grammy awards, including a Grammy Lifetime Achievement Award and two Grammy Hall of Fame Awards. Lewis was inducted into the inaugural class of the Rock and Roll Hall of Fame in 1986, and his pioneering contribution to the genre was recognized by the Rockabilly Hall of Fame. He was also a member of the inaugural class inducted into the Memphis Music Hall of Fame. He was inducted into the Country Music Hall of Fame in 2022. In 1989, his life was chronicled in the movie Great Balls of Fire, starring Dennis Quaid. In 2003, Rolling Stone listed his box set All Killer, No Filler: The Anthology at number 242 on their list of "500 Greatest Albums of All Time". In 2004, they ranked him No. 24 on their list of the 100 Greatest Artists of All Time. Lewis was the last surviving member of Sun Records' Million Dollar Quartet and the album Class of '55, which also included Johnny Cash, Carl Perkins, Roy Orbison, and Elvis Presley.

Music critic Robert Christgau said of Lewis: "His drive, his timing, his offhand vocal power, his unmistakable boogie-plus piano, and his absolute confidence in the face of the void make Jerry Lee the quintessential rock and roller."

== Early life and education ==
Jerry Lee Lewis was born on September 29, 1935, to Elmo Kidd Lewis Sr. and Mary "Mamie" Herron Lewis in Ferriday, Louisiana. He grew up in an impoverished farming family in Eastern Louisiana. In his youth, he began playing the piano with two of his cousins, Mickey Gilley (later a popular country music singer) and Jimmy Swaggart (later a popular televangelist). His parents mortgaged their farm to buy him a piano. Lewis was influenced by a piano-playing older cousin, Carl McVoy (who later recorded with Bill Black's Combo), the radio, and the sounds from Haney's Big House, a black juke joint across the tracks. On November 19, 1949, Lewis made his first public performance of his career, playing with a country and western band at a car dealership in Ferriday. The hit of his set was his performance of R&B artist Stick McGhee's "Drinkin' Wine, Spo-Dee-O-Dee". On the live album By Request, More of the Greatest Live Show on Earth, Lewis is heard naming Moon Mullican as an artist who inspired him.

His mother enrolled him at the Southwest Bible Institute in Waxahachie, Texas, so that he could sing evangelical songs exclusively. When Lewis daringly played a boogie-woogie rendition of "My God Is Real" at a church assembly, his association with the school ended the same night. Pearry Green, then president of the student body, related how during a talent show, Lewis played some "worldly" music. The next morning, the dean of the school called Lewis and Green into his office to expel them. After that incident, he went home and started playing at clubs in and around Ferriday and Natchez, Mississippi, becoming part of the burgeoning new rock and roll sound and cutting his first demonstration recording in 1952 for Cosimo Matassa in New Orleans. Around 1955, he traveled to Nashville, where he played in clubs and attempted to build interest, but was turned down by the Grand Ole Opry, as he was already at the Louisiana Hayride country stage and radio show in Shreveport.

== Career ==
=== J&M Studio ===
Lewis made his first recordings in 1952 at Cosimo Matassa's J&M Recording Studio in New Orleans, Louisiana. He covered Lefty Frizzell's "Don't Stay Away (Till Love Grows Cold)" and his own instrumental composition "Jerry's Boogie" (a.k.a. "New Orleans Boogie").

=== Sun Records ===
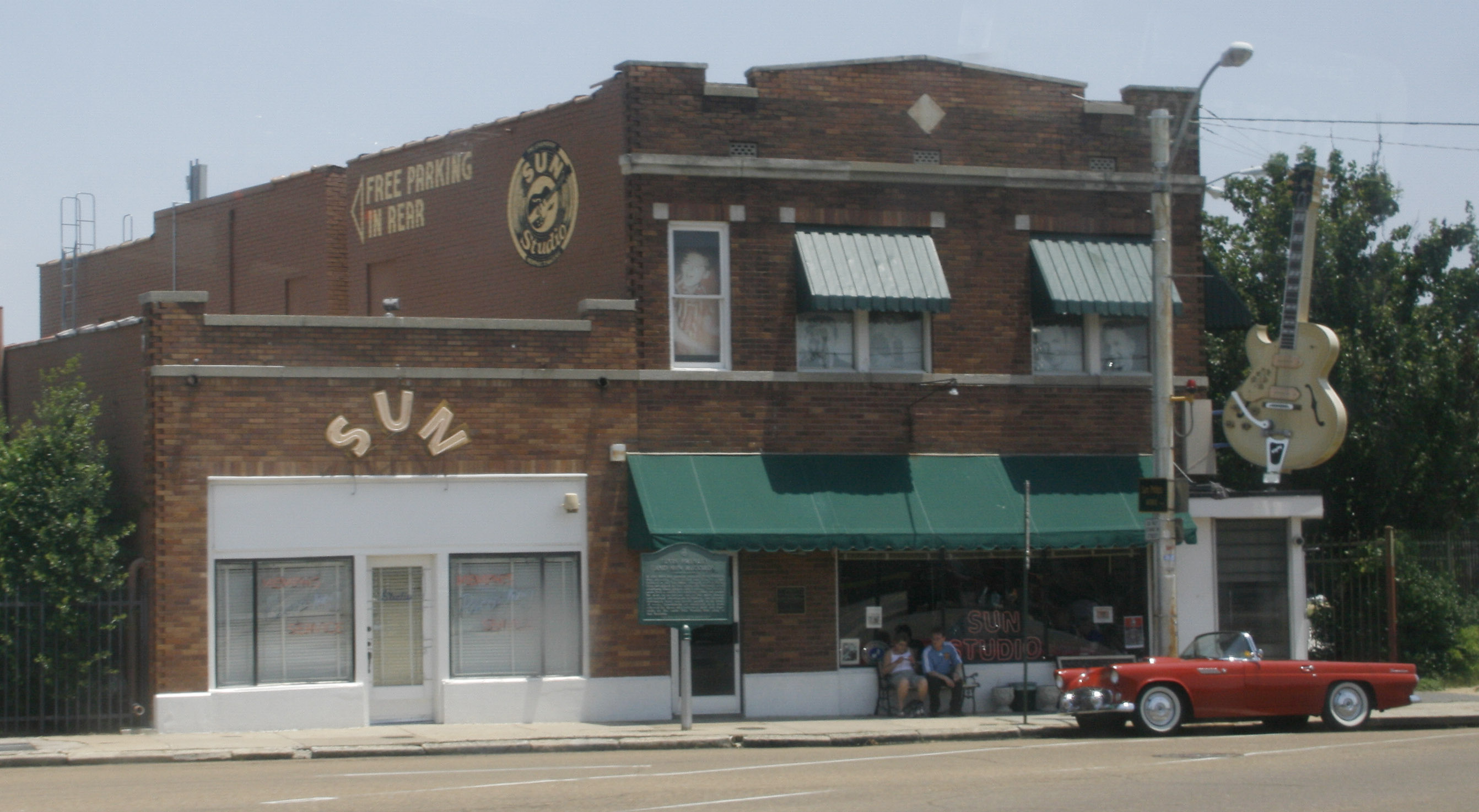
Sun Records in Memphis, Tennessee, where Lewis began his career and recorded many of his most famous singles

Sun Records artist Ray Harris singing "Greenback Dollar", with Lewis playing the piano

In November 1956, Lewis traveled to Memphis to audition for Sun Records. Label owner Sam Phillips was in Florida, but producer and engineer Jack Clement recorded Lewis's rendition of Ray Price's "Crazy Arms" and his own composition "End of the Road". In December 1956, Lewis began recording prolifically as a solo artist and as a session musician for other Sun artists, including Carl Perkins and Johnny Cash. His distinctive piano playing can be heard on many tracks recorded at Sun in late 1956 and early 1957, including Carl Perkins's "Matchbox", "Your True Love", and "Put Your Cat Clothes On", and Billy Lee Riley's "Flyin' Saucers Rock'n'Roll".

On December 4, 1956, Elvis Presley dropped in on Phillips to pay a social visit while Perkins was in the studio cutting new tracks with Lewis backing him on piano. Johnny Cash was also there watching Perkins. The four then started an impromptu jam session and Phillips left the tape running. These recordings, almost half of which were gospel songs, were released on CD as Million Dollar Quartet. Tracks also include Elvis Presley's "Don't Be Cruel" and "Paralyzed", Chuck Berry's "Brown Eyed Handsome Man", and Pat Boone's "Don't Forbid Me".

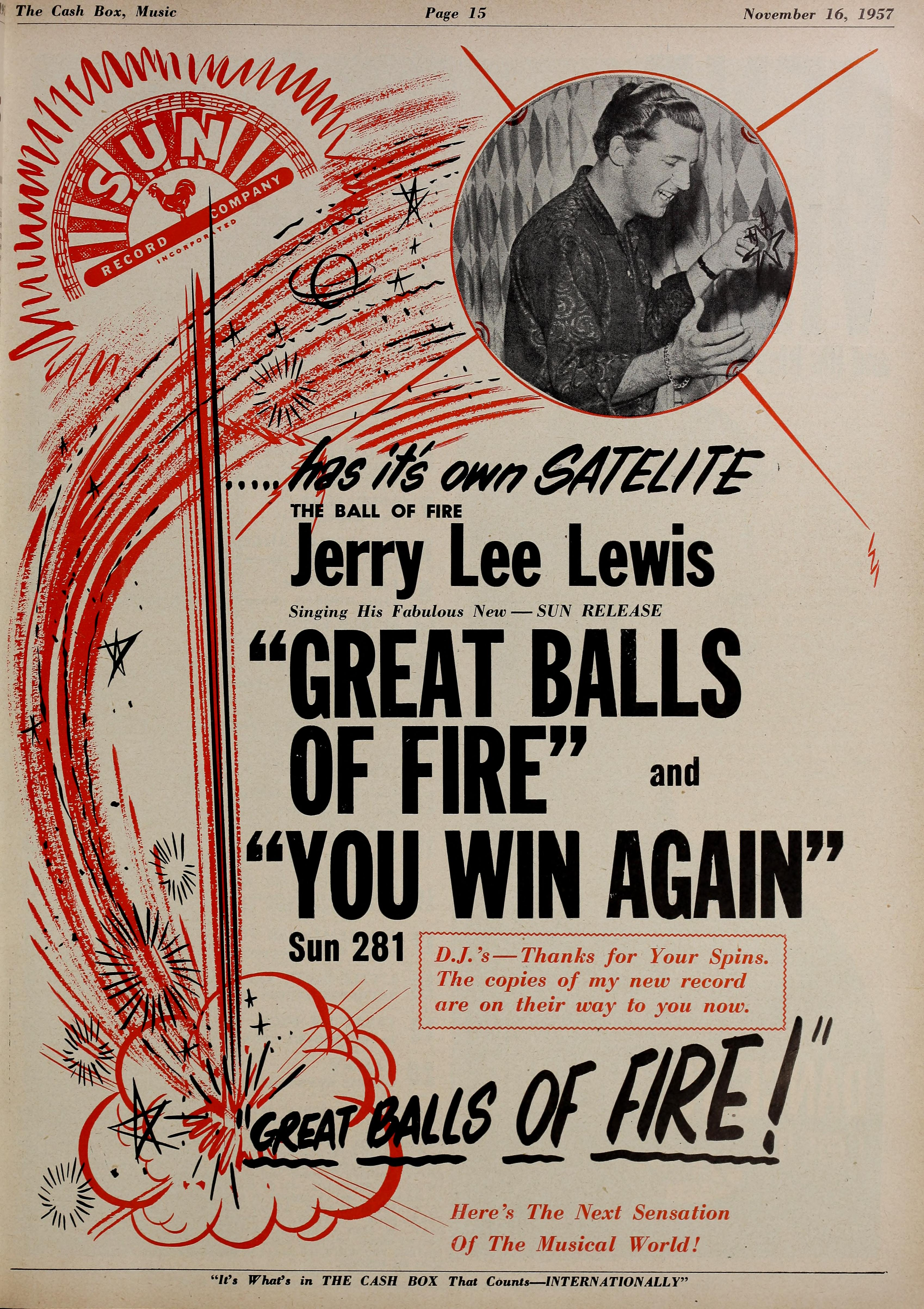
Cash Box advertisement, November 16, 1957

Lewis's own singles (on which he was billed as "Jerry Lee Lewis and his Pumping Piano") advanced his career as a soloist during 1957, with hits such as "Whole Lotta Shakin' Goin' On", a Big Maybelle cover, and "Great Balls of Fire", his biggest hit, bringing him international fame and criticism of the songs, which prompted some radio stations to boycott them. In 2005, "Whole Lotta Shakin' Goin' On" was selected for permanent preservation in the National Recording Registry of the Library of Congress. According to several first-hand sources, including Johnny Cash, Lewis, a devout Christian, was troubled by the sinful nature of his own material, which he believed was leading his audience and himself to Hell. This aspect of Lewis's character was depicted in Waylon Payne's portrayal of Lewis in the 2005 film Walk the Line, based on Cash's autobiographies.

As part of his stage act, Lewis pounded the keys with his heel, kicked the piano bench aside, and played standing, raking his hands up and down the keys, sat on the keyboard, and stood on the piano. He told the Pop Chronicles that kicking over the bench originally happened by accident, but when it got a favorable response, he kept it in the act. His inaugural television appearance, in which he demonstrated some of these moves, was on The Steve Allen Show on July 28, 1957, where he played "Whole Lotta Shakin' Goin On".

His dynamic performance style can be seen in films such as High School Confidential (he sang the title song from the back of a flatbed truck), and Jamboree. Cub Koda called him "rock and roll's first great wild man" and also "rock and roll's first great eclectic". Classical composer Michael Nyman has also cited Lewis's style as the progenitor of his own aesthetic.

In 1960, Phillips opened a new state-of-the-art studio at 639 Madison Avenue in Memphis, abandoning the old Union Avenue studio where Phillips had recorded B.B. King, Howlin' Wolf, Elvis Presley, Roy Orbison, Carl Perkins, Lewis, Johnny Cash, and others, and also opened a studio in Nashville. At the latter studio, Lewis recorded his only major hit during this period, a rendition of Ray Charles's "What'd I Say" in 1961. In Europe, other updated versions of "Sweet Little Sixteen" (September 1962 UK) and "Good Golly, Miss Molly" (March 1963) entered the hit parade. On popular EPs, "Hang Up My Rock and Roll Shoes", "I've Been Twistin'", "Money", and "Hello Josephine" also became turntable hits, especially in nascent discothèques. Another recording of Lewis playing an instrumental boogie arrangement of the Glenn Miller Orchestra's "In the Mood" was issued on the Phillips International label under the pseudonym "The Hawk".

=== Marriage controversy ===
Lewis's turbulent personal life was hidden from the public until a May 1958 British tour where Ray Berry, a news agency reporter at London's Heathrow Airport (the only journalist present), learned about Lewis's third wife, Myra Gale Brown. She was Lewis's cousin and was 13 years old when they married—though Lewis, who was 22 years old at the time, claimed she was actually 15. The publicity caused an uproar, and the tour was canceled after only three concerts.

=== Smash Records ===
Lewis's Sun recording contract ended in 1963, and he joined Smash Records, where he made several rock recordings that did not further his career. The team at Smash (a division of Mercury Records) came up with "I'm on Fire", a song that they felt would be perfect for Lewis, and as Colin Escott writes in the sleeve to the retrospective A Half Century of Hits, "Mercury held the presses, thinking they had found Lewis's comeback hit, and it might have happened if the Beatles hadn't arrived in America, changing radio playlists almost overnight. Mercury didn't really know what to do with Lewis after that." One of Smash's first decisions was to record a retread of his Sun hits, Golden Hits of Jerry Lee Lewis, which was inspired by the continuing enthusiasm European fans had shown for Lewis's firebrand rock and roll. In June 1963, Lewis returned to the UK for the first time since the scandal that nearly ended his career five years earlier, to headline a performance on the MV Royal Daffodil, for a cross-channel rock-and-roll cruise from Southend, Essex, to Boulogne, France. For this performance, he was backed by Ritchie Blackmore and the Outlaws. None of Lewis's early Smash albums, including The Return of Rock, Memphis Beat, and Soul My Way, were commercial successes.

=== Live at the Star Club, Hamburg ===
One major success during these lost years was the concert album Live at the Star Club, Hamburg, recorded with the Nashville Teens in 1964, which is considered one of the greatest live albums ever. In Joe Bonomo's book Lost and Found, producer Siggi Loch stated that the recording setup was uncomplicated, with microphones placed as close to the instruments as possible and a stereo microphone placed in the audience to capture the ambience. The results were sonically astonishing, with Bonomo observing, "Detractors complain of the album's crashing noisiness, the lack of subtlety with which Jerry Lee revisits the songs, the fact that the piano is mixed too loudly, but what is certain is that Siggi Loch on this spring evening captured something brutally honest about the Killer, about the primal and timeless centre of the very best rock & roll..." The album showcases Lewis's skills as a pianist and singer, honed by relentless touring. In a 5-out-of-5-stars review, Milo Miles wrote in Rolling Stone that "Live at the Star Club, Hamburg is not an album, it's a crime scene: Jerry Lee Lewis slaughters his rivals in a 13-song set that feels like one long convulsion."

=== Country comeback ===
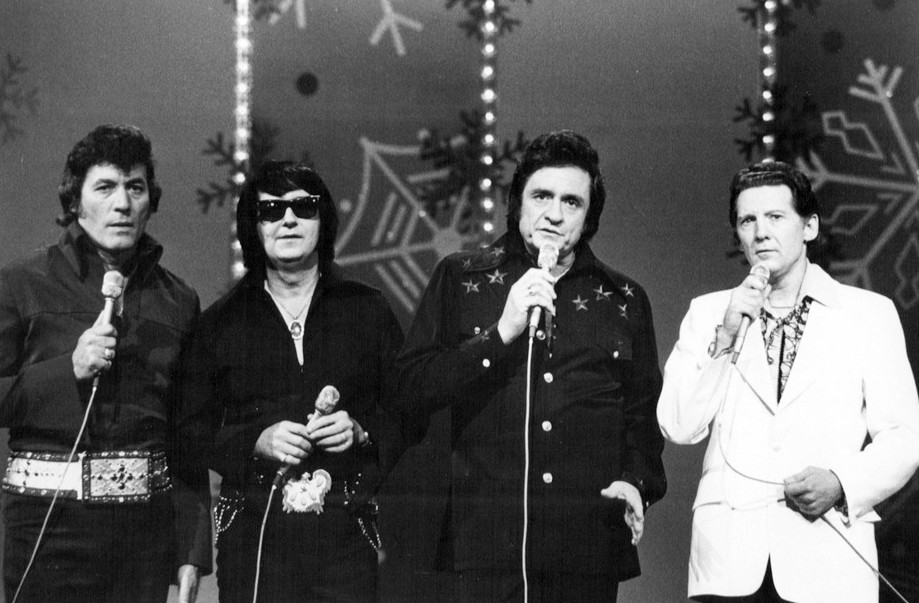
Lewis performing with Carl Perkins, Roy Orbison, and Johnny Cash on The Johnny Cash Christmas Special in November 1977

Frustrated by Smash's inability to score a hit, Lewis was planning on leaving the label when promotions manager Eddie Kilroy pitched the idea of cutting a pure country record in Nashville. With nothing to lose, Lewis agreed to record the Jerry Chesnut song "Another Place, Another Time", which was released as a single on March 9, 1968, and, to everyone's amazement, shot up the country charts. At the time of the release, Lewis had been playing Iago in a rock-and-roll adaptation of Othello called Catch My Soul in Los Angeles, but was soon rushed back to Nashville to record another batch of songs with producer Jerry Kennedy. What followed was a string of hits that no one could have predicted, although country music always remained a major part of Lewis's repertoire. As Colin Escott observes in the sleeve to the 1995 compilation Killer Country, the conversion to country music in 1968 "looked at the time like a radical shift, but it was neither as abrupt nor as unexpected as it seemed. Jerry had always recorded country music, and his country breakthrough 'Another Place, Another Time' had been preceded by countless country records starting with his first, 'Crazy Arms', in 1956." The last time Lewis had had a song on the country charts was with "Pen and Paper" in 1964, which had reached number 36, but "Another Place, Another Time" went all the way to number four and remained on the charts for 17 weeks.

Between 1968 and 1977, Lewis had 17 top-10 hit singles on the Billboard country chart, including four chart toppers. Hits include "What's Made Milwaukee Famous (Has Made a Loser Out of Me)", "To Make Love Sweeter for You", "She Still Comes Around (To Love What's Left of Me)", "Since I Met You, Baby", "Once More With Feeling", "One Has My Name (The Other Has My Heart)", and "Sometimes a Memory Ain't Enough". The production on his early country albums, such as Another Place, Another Time and She Even Woke Me Up To Say Goodbye, was sparse, quite different from the slick "Nashville sound" that was predominant on country radio at the time, and also expressed a full commitment by Lewis to a country audience. The songs still featured Lewis's inimitable piano flourishes, but critics were most taken aback by the rock-and-roll pioneer's effortlessly soulful vocals, which possessed an emotional resonance on par with the most respected country singers of the time, such as George Jones and Merle Haggard. In his book Jerry Lee Lewis: His Own Story, biographer Rick Bragg notes that the songs Lewis was recording "were of the kind they were starting to call 'hard country', not because it had a rock beat or crossed over into rock in a real way, but because it was more substantial than the cloying, overproduced mess out there on country radio".

In a remarkable turnaround, Lewis became a bankable country star. He had become so popular in 1970 that his former Smash producer Shelby Singleton, who purchased Sun Records from Sam Phillips in July 1969, wasted no time in repackaging many of Lewis's old country recordings, which some fans assumed were recent releases. One of his later unreleased Sun recordings, "One Minute Past Eternity", was issued as a single and reached number two on the country chart, following Lewis's recent Mercury hit "She Even Woke Me Up to Say Goodbye". Singleton would promote these unreleased recordings for years, following The Golden Cream of the Country with A Taste of Country later in 1970.

=== Grand Ole Opry appearance ===
Lewis played the Grand Ole Opry only once, on January 20, 1973. As Colin Escott writes in the liner notes to A Half Century of Hits, he had maintained an ambivalence to Music City ever since he was turned away as an aspiring musician before his glory days at Sun Records: "It was 18 years since he had left Nashville broke and disheartened ... Lewis was never truly accepted in Nashville. He didn't move there and didn't schmooze there. He didn't fit in with the family-values crowd. Lewis family values weren't necessarily worse, but they were different."

As recounted in a 2015 online Rolling Stone article by Beville Dunkerly, Lewis opened with his comeback single "Another Place, Another Time". Ignoring his allotted time constraints, and thus commercial breaks, Lewis played for 40 minutes (the average Opry performance is two songs, for about eight minutes of stage time maximum) and invited Del Wood—the one member of the Opry who had been kind to him when he had been there as a teenager—out on stage to sing with him. He also blasted through "Whole Lotta Shakin' Going On", "Workin' Man Blues", "Good Golly, Miss Molly", and a number of other classics.

=== The Session and Southern Roots ===
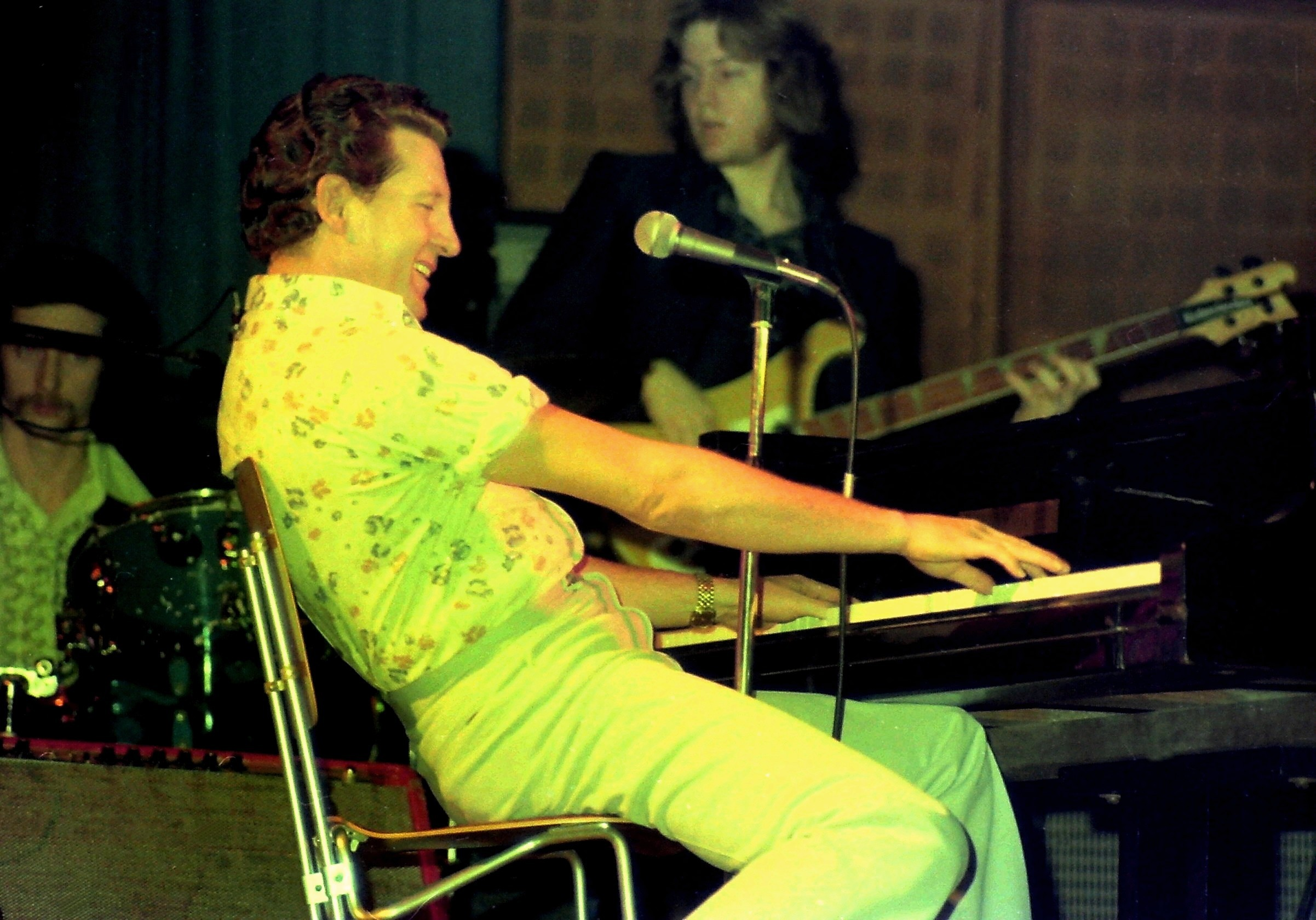
Lewis performing in 1977

Lewis returned to the pop charts with "Me and Bobby McGee" in 1971 and "Chantilly Lace" in 1972, and this, coupled with a revitalized public interest in vintage rock and roll, inspired Mercury to fly Lewis to London in 1973 to record with a cadre of British and Irish musicians, including Rory Gallagher, Kenney Jones, and Albert Lee. By all accounts, the sessions were tense. The remake of Lewis's old Sun cut "Drinking Wine Spo-Dee-O-Dee" was the album's hit single, reaching number 20 on the Billboard country chart and peaking at number 41 on the pop chart. The Session was his highest pop charting album since 1964's Golden Hits of Jerry Lee Lewis, hitting number 37. It did far better on the country albums chart, rising to number four. Later that year, he went to Memphis and recorded Southern Roots: Back Home to Memphis, a soul-infused rock album produced by Huey Meaux. According to Rick Bragg's authorized 2014 biography, "the Killer" was in a foul mood when he showed up at Trans Maximus Studios in Memphis to record: "During these sessions, he insulted the producer, threatened to kill a photographer, and drank and medicated his way into but not out of a fog." During one exchange that can be heard on the 2013 reissue Southern Roots: The Original Sessions, Meaux asks Lewis, "Do you wanna try one?", meaning a take, to which Lewis replies, "If you got enough fuckin' sense to cut it." Lewis was still pumping out country albums, although the hits were beginning to dry up. His last big hit with Mercury was "Middle Age Crazy", which made it to number four in 1977.

=== Later career ===
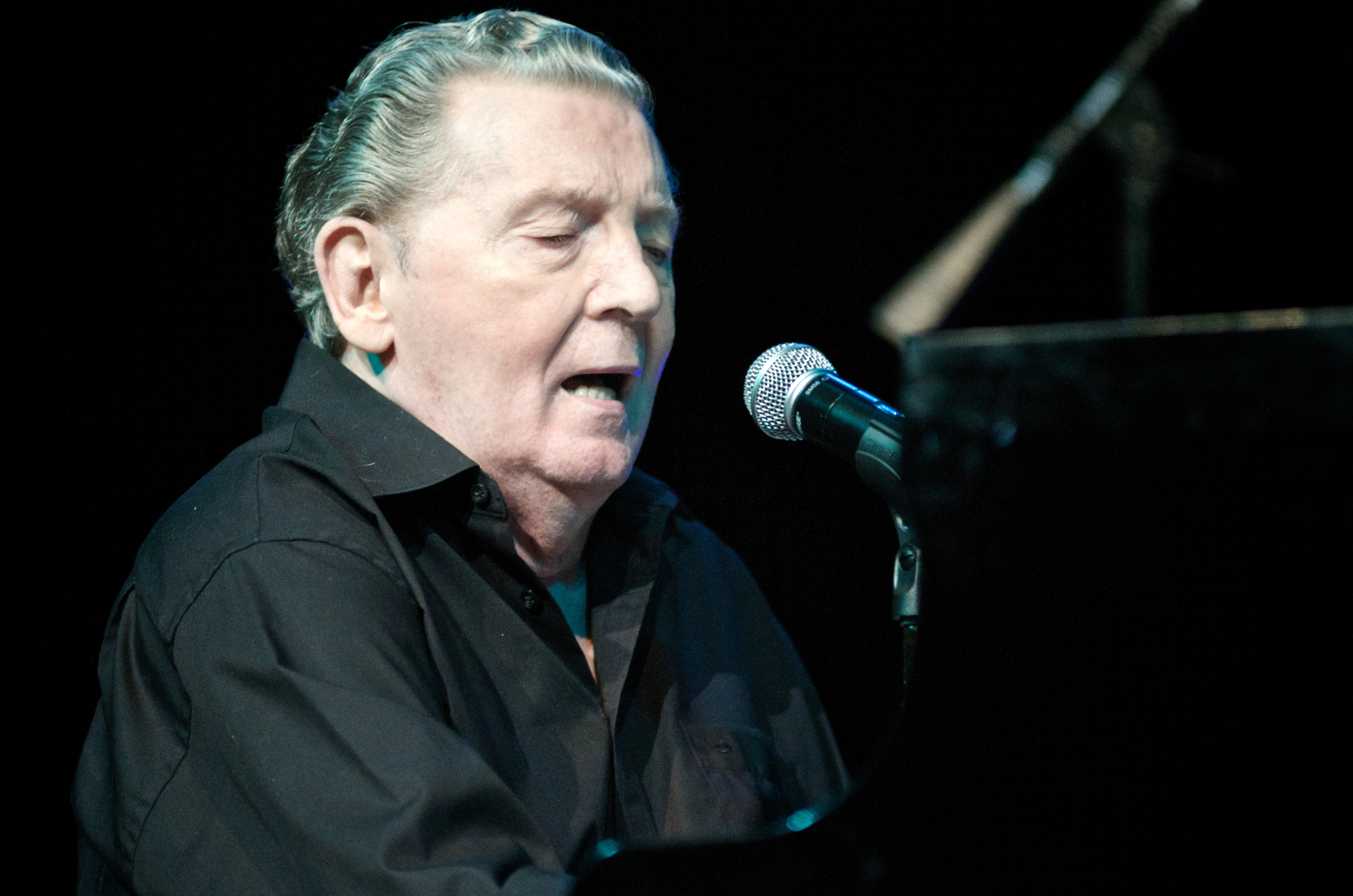
Lewis performing in 2009

In 1979, Lewis switched to the Elektra label, and produced the critically acclaimed Jerry Lee Lewis, although sales were disappointing. In 1986, Lewis was one of the inaugural inductees into the Rock and Roll Hall of Fame. Although looking frail after several hospitalizations due to stomach problems, Lewis was responsible for beginning an unplanned jam at the end of the evening, which was incorporated into all future events. That year, he returned to Sun Studio in Memphis to team up with Orbison, Cash, and Perkins along with longtime admirers including John Fogerty to create the album Class of '55.

In 1989, a major motion picture based on his early life in rock and roll, Great Balls of Fire!, brought him back into the public eye, especially when he decided to re-record all his songs for the movie soundtrack. The film was based on the book by Lewis's ex-wife, Myra Gale Lewis, and starred Dennis Quaid as Lewis, Winona Ryder as Myra, and Alec Baldwin as Jimmy Swaggart. The movie focuses on Lewis's early career and his relationship with Myra, and ends with the scandal of the late 1950s. A year later, Lewis made minor news when a new song he recorded called "It Was the Whiskey Talkin' (Not Me)" was included in the soundtrack to the hit movie Dick Tracy. The song is also heard in the movie, playing on the radio. The public downfall of his cousin, televangelist Jimmy Swaggart around the same time, resulted in more adverse publicity to a troubled family. Swaggart is also a piano player, as is another cousin, country music star Mickey Gilley. All three listened to the same music in their youth, and frequented Haney's Big House, the Ferriday club that featured Black blues acts. Lewis and Swaggart had a complex relationship over the years.

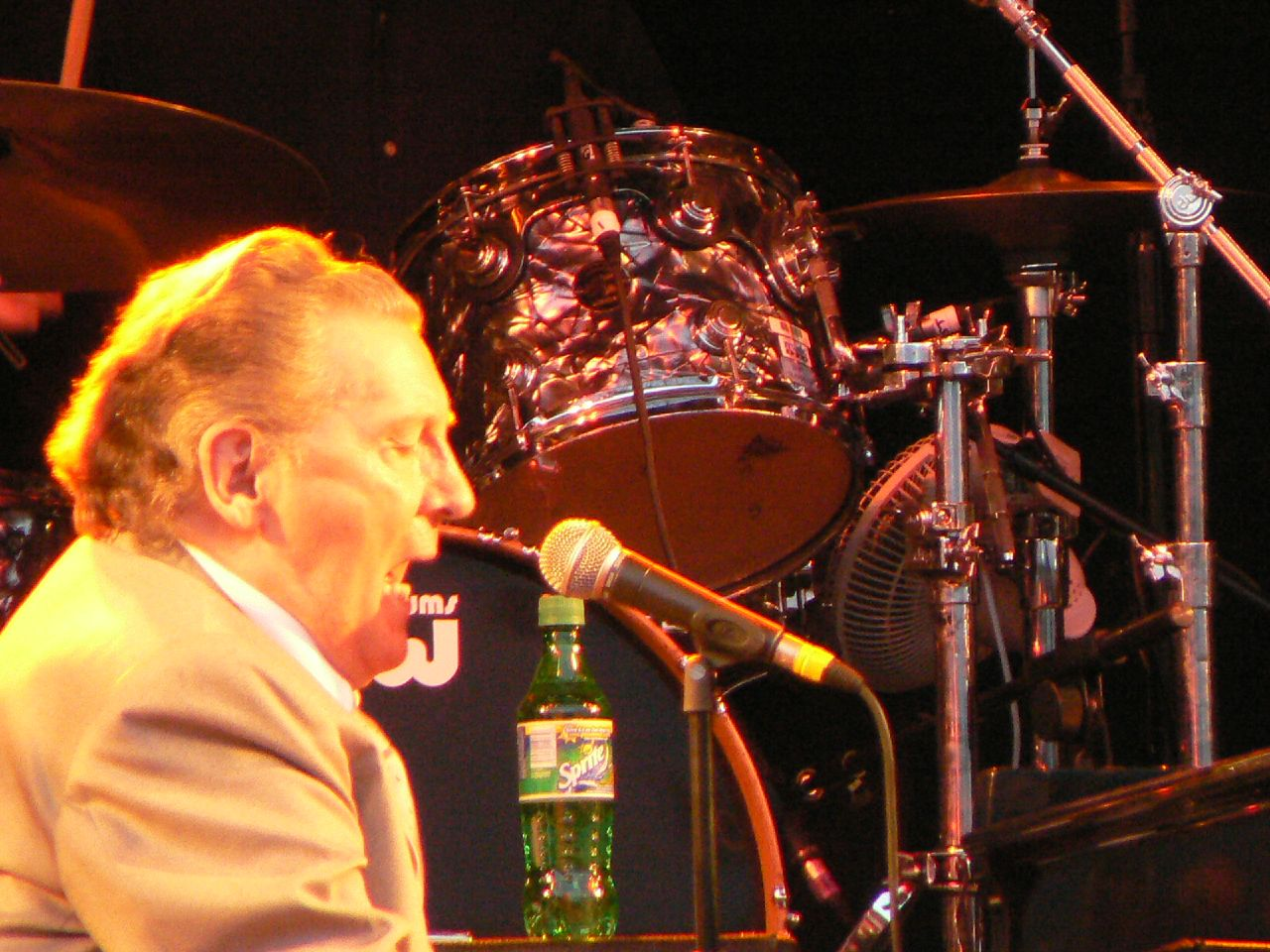
Lewis performing at the Rhythm Festival in Bedford, England, in 2006

In 1998, Lewis toured Europe with Chuck Berry and Little Richard. On February 12, 2005, he was given a Lifetime Achievement Award by the Recording Academy. On September 26, 2006, a new album titled Last Man Standing was released, featuring many of rock and roll's elite as guest stars. Receiving positive reviews, the album charted on four different Billboard charts, including a two-week stay at number one on the Indie charts. A DVD entitled Last Man Standing Live, featuring concert footage with many guest artists, was released in March 2007.

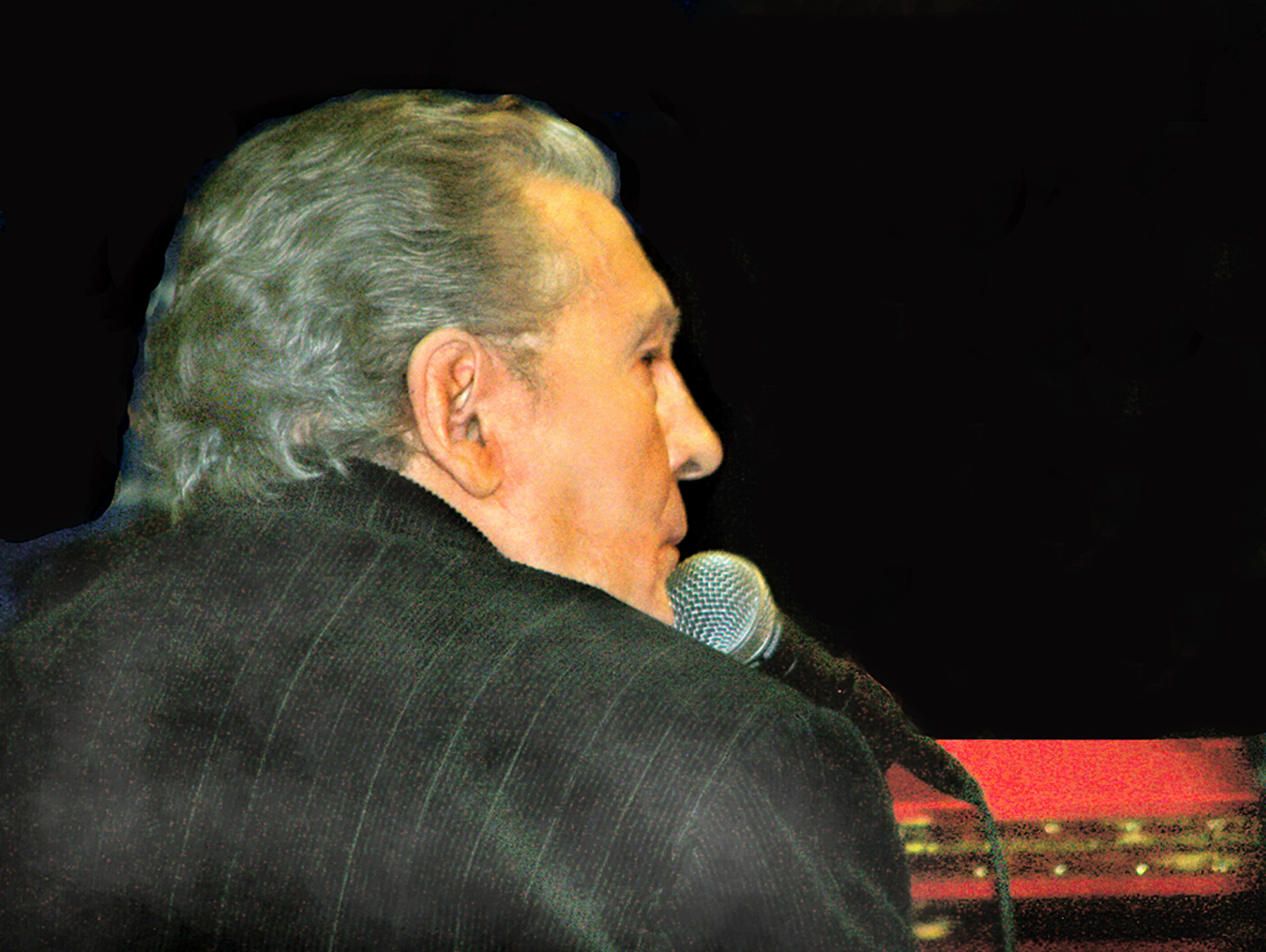
Lewis performing in 2006

In October 2008, as part of a successful European tour, Lewis appeared at two London shows, a special private show at the 100 Club on October 25, and at the London Forum on October 28 with Wanda Jackson and his sister, Linda Gail Lewis. In August 2009, in advance of his new album, a single entitled "Mean Old Man" was released for download. It was written by Kris Kristofferson. An EP featuring this song and four more was also released on November 11. On October 29, 2009, Lewis opened the Rock and Roll Hall of Fame 25th Anniversary concert at Madison Square Garden in New York City.

In May 2013, Lewis opened a new club on Beale Street in Memphis. Lewis was still considered actively performing in concert, though he had to cancel all shows following his February 28, 2019, stroke, waiting for his doctors' go-ahead.

In 2017, Lewis had a personal presence at The Country Music Television Skyville Live show. It was a specially recorded performance featuring a whole array of artists paying tribute to the music of Lewis.

In March 2020, Lewis, together with producer T-Bone Burnett and guitarist James Burton, were announced as recording a new album of gospel covers. It was the first time he entered a recording studio following his stroke. How much progress was made with this gospel album, or if it was ever completed, is unknown, as nothing from these sessions has been released; Lewis later recorded another gospel album with cousin Jimmy Swaggart that was unrelated to the 2020 project with Burnett and Burton.

On October 27, 2020, to celebrate Lewis's 85th birthday, a livestream aired on YouTube, Facebook, and his official website. The livestream special, Whole Lotta Celebratin' Goin' On, featured appearances and performances by Willie Nelson, Elton John, Mike Love, Priscilla Presley, Joe Walsh, and others. John Stamos served as the host.

Jerry Lee Lewis: Trouble in Mind is a documentary on Lewis, released in 2022 and directed by Ethan Coen. That same year, Lewis and his cousin Jimmy Swaggart collaborated on and released a gospel album, called The Boys from Ferriday.

== Artistry ==
Lewis was an incendiary showman who often played with his fists, elbows, feet, and backside, sometimes climbing on top of the piano during gigs, and even apocryphally setting it on fire. Like Chuck Berry's guitar playing, Lewis's piano style became synonymous with rock and roll, having influenced generations of piano players.

In a 2013 interview with Leah Harper, Elton John recalls that until "Great Balls of Fire", "the piano playing that I had heard had been more sedate. My dad collected George Shearing records, but this was the first time I heard someone beat the shit out of a piano. When I saw Little Richard at the Harrow Granada, he played it standing up, but Jerry Lee Lewis actually jumped on the piano! This was astonishing to me, that people could do that. Those records had such a huge effect on me, and they were just so great. I learned to play like that."

Lewis was primarily known for his "boogie-woogie" style, which is characterized by a regular left-hand bass figure and dancing beat, but his command of the instrument and highly individualistic style set him apart. Appearing on Memphis Sounds with George Klein in 2011, Lewis credited his older piano-playing cousin Carl McVoy as being a crucial influence, stating, "He was a great piano player, a great singer, and a nice-looking man, carried himself real well. I miss Carl very much." Lewis also cited Moon Mullican as a source of inspiration. Although almost entirely self-taught, Lewis conceded to biographer Rich Bragg in 2014 that Paul Whitehead, a blind pianist from Meadville, Mississippi, was another key influence on him in his earliest days playing clubs.

== Legacy ==
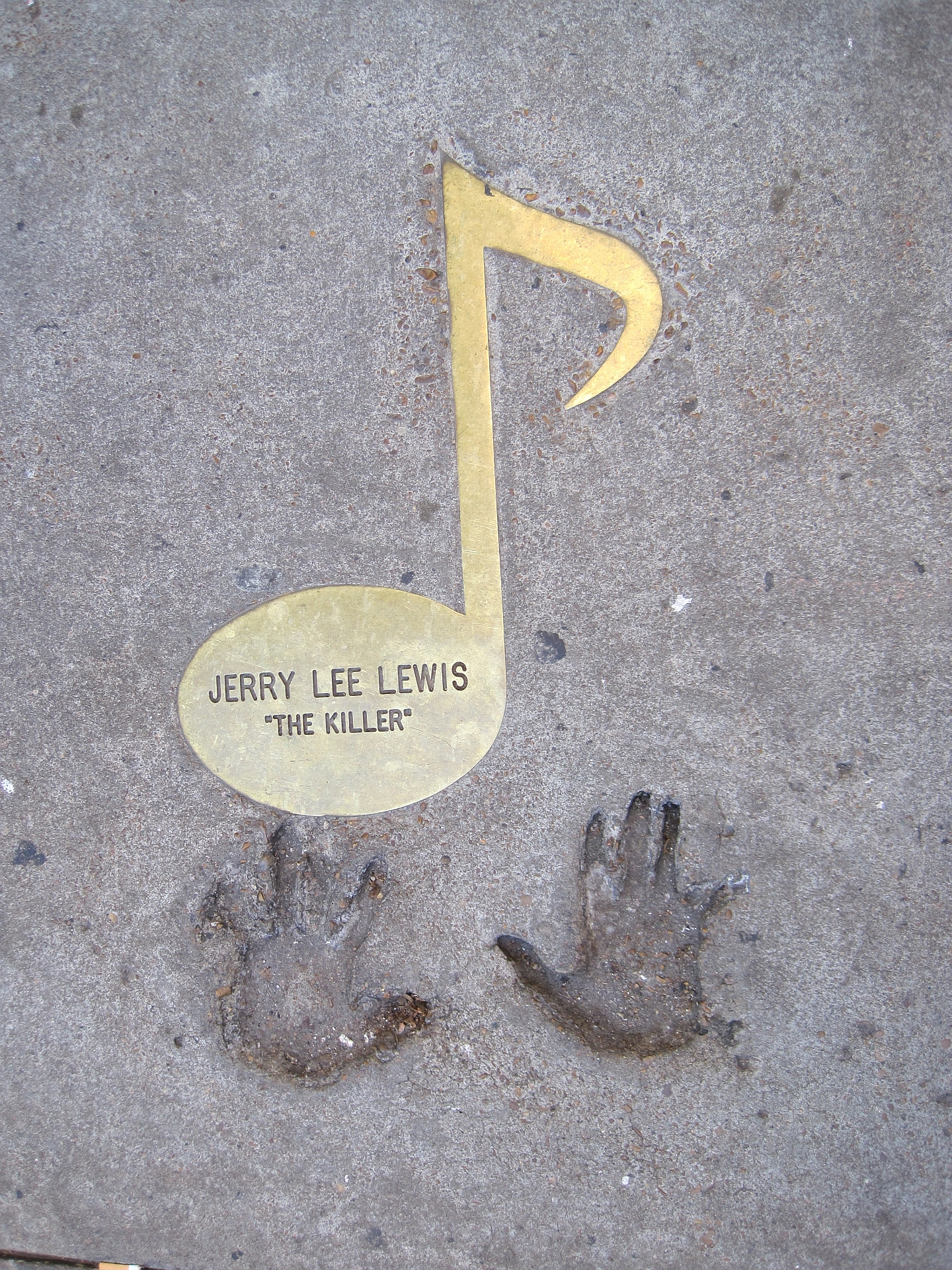
Lewis's "Brass Note" at the Beale Street Walk of Fame in Memphis

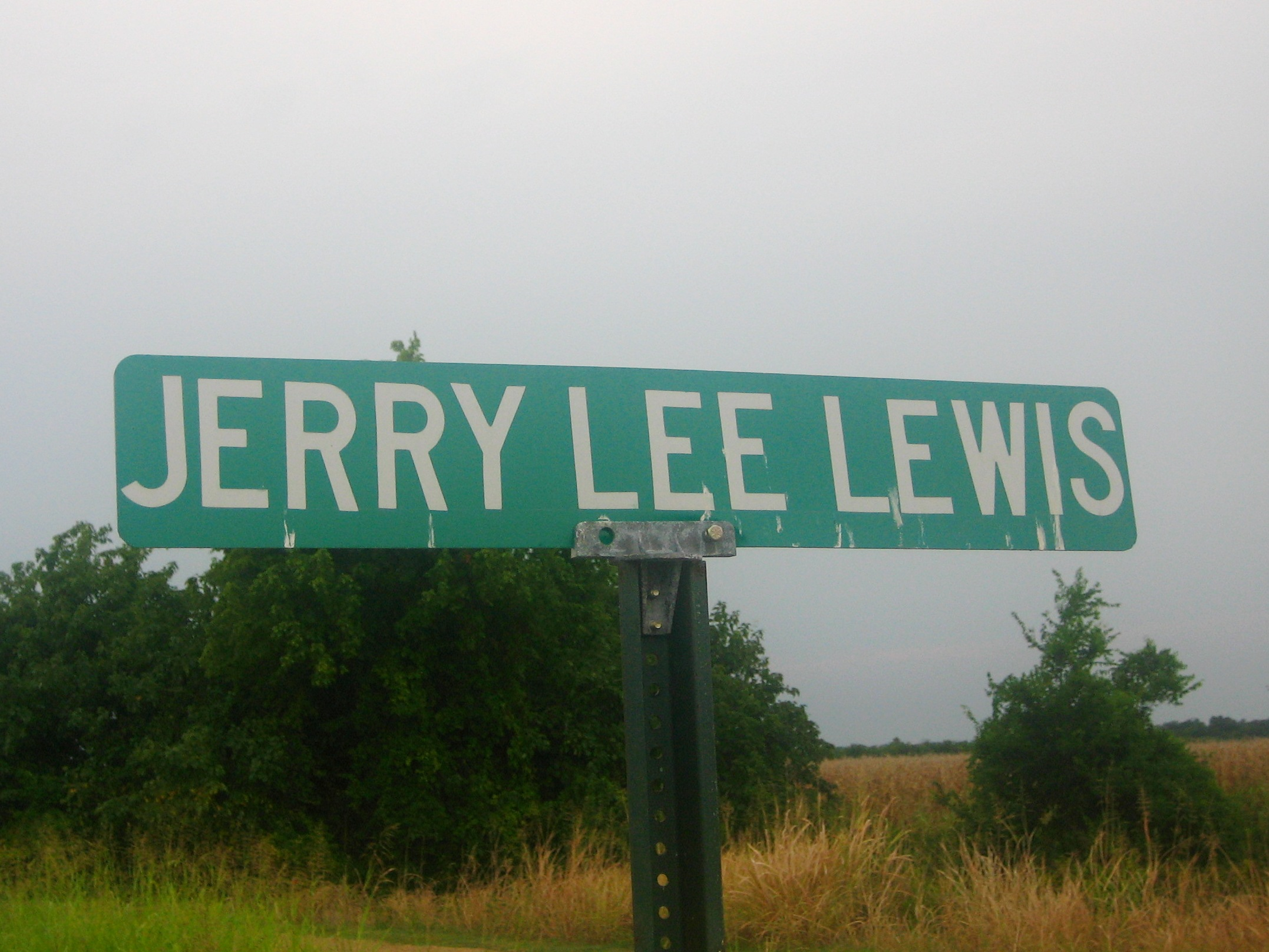
Jerry Lee Lewis Avenue in Ferriday, Louisiana

Along with Johnny Cash, Carl Perkins, and Roy Orbison, Lewis received the first Grammy Award in the spoken-word category for the very rare album of interviews released with some early copies of the Class of '55 album in 1986. The original Sun cut of "Great Balls of Fire" was elected to the Grammy Hall of Fame in 1998, and Lewis's Sun recording of "Whole Lotta Shakin' Goin' On" received this honor in 1999. Only recordings that are at least 25 years old and have left a lasting impression can receive this honor. On February 12, 2005, Lewis received the Recording Academy's Lifetime Achievement Award the day before the Recording Academy's main Grammy Awards ceremony, which he also attended.

In June 1989, Lewis was honored for his contribution to the recording industry with a star along Hollywood Boulevard on the Hollywood Walk of Fame. On October 10, 2007, Lewis received the Rock and Roll Hall of Fame's American Music Masters Award. His next album, Mean Old Man, was released in September 2010, and reached number 30 on the Billboard 200 album chart.

On November 5, 2007, the Rock and Roll Hall of Fame and Case Western Reserve University in Cleveland, Ohio, honored Lewis with six days of conferences, interviews, a DVD premiere, and film clips, dedicated to him and entitled The Life and Music of Jerry Lee Lewis. On November 10, the week culminated with a tribute concert by Kris Kristofferson. Lewis was present to accept the American Music Masters Award and closed his own tribute show with a rendition of "Over the Rainbow". On February 10, 2008, he appeared with John Fogerty and Little Richard on the 50th Grammy Awards, performing "Great Balls of Fire" in a medley with "Good Golly Miss Molly". On June 4, 2008, Lewis was inducted into the Louisiana Music Hall of Fame, and appeared on A Capitol Fourth and performed the finale's final act with a medley of "Roll Over Beethoven", "Whole Lotta Shakin' Goin On", and "Great Balls of Fire".

In December 2019, Lewis was honored with a Mississippi Country Music Trail marker at his ranch in Nesbit, Mississippi, to celebrate his contributions to country music.

In May 2022, Lewis was announced as a member-elect to the Country Music Hall of Fame, to be inducted in October 2022. "This year's inductees are trailblazers who each paved their own unique path within country music," Sarah Trahern, CMA chief executive officer, said. "Jerry Lee, Keith (Whitley), and Joe (Galante) each found their [sic] musical callings early in life and displayed a strong-minded and fierce passion for music making. In very different ways, they all have left a lasting impact on the industry and generations of fans alike. I am thrilled to welcome this deserving class to the Country Music Hall of Fame." "I'm just overwhelmed that they asked me here today," Lewis, 86, said during an event earlier that week at the Country Music Hall of Fame in Nashville, adding that his career had taught him to "be a good person and treat people right."

== Personal life ==
=== Family and children ===
Lewis was married seven times, including bigamous marriages and a marriage with his underaged cousin. He had six children during his marriages.

When Jerry Lee Lewis was 16, he married Dorothy Barton, the daughter of a preacher. The union lasted from February 1952 to October 1953.

Lewis's second marriage to Sally Jane Mitcham in September 1953 occurred 23 days before his divorce from Barton was final, so the marriage was not legally accepted. They had two children: Jerry Lee Lewis Jr. (1954–1973) and Ronnie Guy Lewis (b. 1956). After four years, he filed for divorce in October 1957. Jerry Lee Lewis Jr. died in 1973, at the age of 19, when the Jeep he was driving overturned.

His third marriage was to 13-year-old Myra Gale Brown, his cousin, on December 12, 1957. His divorce from Jane Mitcham was not finalized before the ceremony took place, so he remarried Brown on June 4, 1958. They had two children: Steve Allen Lewis (1959–1962) and Phoebe Allen Lewis (b. 1963). Brown was only 14 years old when their son was born. In 1962, Steve Allen Lewis drowned in a swimming pool accident at the age of three. In 1970, Brown filed for divorce on the grounds of adultery and abuse, stating that she had been "subject to every type of physical and mental abuse imaginable."

His fourth marriage was to Jaren Elizabeth Gunn Pate, from October 1971 to June 8, 1982. Pate drowned in a swimming pool at the home of a friend with whom she was staying, several weeks before divorce proceedings could be finalized. They had one daughter, Lori Lee Lewis (b. 1972).

Mary Kathy "K.K." Jones of San Antonio, Texas, testified in court during Lewis's income tax evasion trial in 1984 that she lived with him from 1980 to 1983.

Lewis's fifth marriage, to Shawn Stephens, lasted 77 days, from June to August 1983, ending with her death from an overdose of methadone. Journalist Richard Ben Cramer alleged that Lewis abused and may have killed her.

His sixth marriage, to Kerrie McCarver, lasted 21 years, from April 1984 to June 2005. They had one child: Jerry Lee Lewis III (b. 1987).

In 1993, Lewis moved to Ireland with his family in what was suggested (but denied) to be a move to avoid issues with the Internal Revenue Service. He lived in a rented house on Westminster Road in Foxrock, Dublin, and during his time there was sued by the German company Neue Constantin Film Production GmbH for failure to appear at a concert in Munich in 1993. Lewis returned to the U.S. in 1997 after his tax issues had been resolved by Irish promoter Kieran Cavanagh.

Lewis lived on a ranch in Nesbit, Mississippi, with his family.

Lewis married his seventh wife, Judith Lewis (née Brown, Myra Gale Brown's brother's former wife), on March 9, 2012. The next day, Lewis severed business ties with his daughter, Phoebe Lewis-Loftin, who was his manager, and revoked her power of attorney. In 2017, Lewis sued his daughter and her husband Zeke Loftin, claiming that she owed him "substantial sums of money". In the lawsuit, Lewis, his wife Judith Lewis, and his son Jerry Lee Lewis III also claimed Loftin defamed them on Facebook. Lewis-Loftin and her husband countersued, claiming Judith Lewis and Jerry Lee Lewis III interfered in the business relationship. In April 2019, U.S. District Judge Neal Biggers ruled that most of the claims were barred by a three-year statute of limitations except the defamation claims.

=== Religious beliefs ===
As a teenager, Lewis studied at the Southwest Bible Institute in Waxahachie, Texas, before being thrown out for playing a "worldly" boogie-woogie version of "My God Is Real", and that early incident foreshadowed his lifelong conflict over his faith in God and his love of playing "the devil's music". Lewis had a recorded argument with Sam Phillips during the recording session for "Great Balls of Fire", a song he initially refused to record because he considered it blasphemous ("How can... How can the devil save souls? What are you talkin' about?" he asks Phillips during one heated exchange.) During the famous Million Dollar Quartet jam involving Lewis, Elvis Presley, Carl Perkins, and Johnny Cash, they performed several gospel songs. Lewis's biographer Rick Bragg explains that part of the reason the recording only features Lewis and Elvis singing is because "only Elvis and Jerry Lee [were] raised in the Assembly of God", and "'Johnny and Carl didn't really know the words... they was Baptists, [Lewis] said, and therefore deprived."

In the 1990 documentary The Jerry Lee Lewis Story, Lewis said to the interviewer, "The Bible doesn't even speak of religion. No word of religion is even in the Bible. Sanctification! Are you sanctified? Have you been saved? See, I was a good preacher, I know my Bible? I find myself falling short of the glory of God."

Gospel music was a staple of his performing repertoire. After a string of hit country albums, he recorded a gospel album for the first time in 1970 (it was released in 1971).

Lewis was also a cousin of televangelist Jimmy Swaggart.

=== Public intoxication arrest ===
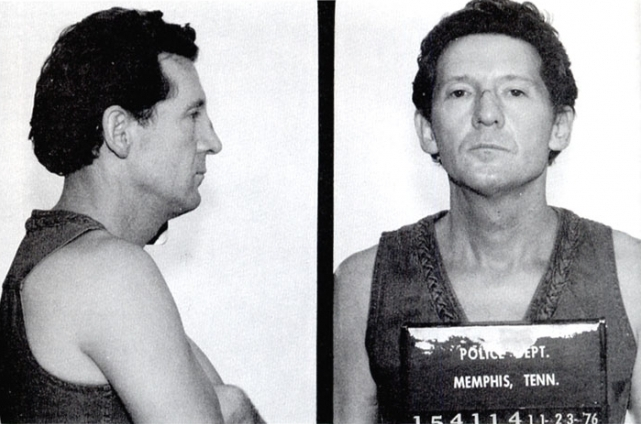
Mugshot in 1976

On September 29, 1976 (Lewis's 41st birthday), Lewis fired a .357 Magnum at a Coke bottle in his bedroom. The bullet ricocheted and accidentally hit bassist Butch Owens in the chest. Owens survived.

On November 23, 1976, Lewis was arrested outside Elvis Presley's Graceland home for allegedly intending to shoot him. In Rick Bragg's 2014 authorized biography, Jerry Lee Lewis: His Own Story, Lewis said that the reclusive Presley had been trying to reach him and finally did on November 23, imploring him to "come out to the house." Lewis replied that he would if he had time, but that he was busy trying to get his father, Elmo, out of jail in Tunica for driving under the influence. Later that night, Lewis was at a Memphis nightclub called the Vapors drinking champagne when he was given a gun. Lewis suddenly remembered that Elvis wanted to see him, and climbing aboard his new Lincoln Continental with the loaded pistol on the dash, so he would not be charged for having a "concealed" weapon, a bottle of champagne under his arm, and tore off for Graceland. Just before three o'clock in the morning, Lewis accidentally smashed into the famous Graceland gates.

Presley's astonished cousin Harold Lloyd was manning the gate and watched Lewis attempt to hurl the champagne bottle out the car window, not realizing the window was rolled up, smashing both. Bragg reports that Lewis denies ever intending to do Presley harm, that the two were friends, but "Elvis, watching on the closed-circuit television, told guards to call the police. The Memphis police found the gun in the car and put Lewis, protesting, hollering, threatening them, away in handcuffs." Lewis said, "The cops asked Elvis, 'What do you want us to do? And Elvis told 'em, 'Lock him up.' That hurt my feelings. To be scared of me – knowin' me the way he did – was ridiculous." Lewis was charged with carrying a pistol and public drunkenness. Released on a $250 bond, his defiant mugshot was wired around the world. Presley himself died at Graceland nine months later.

=== Financial debt ===
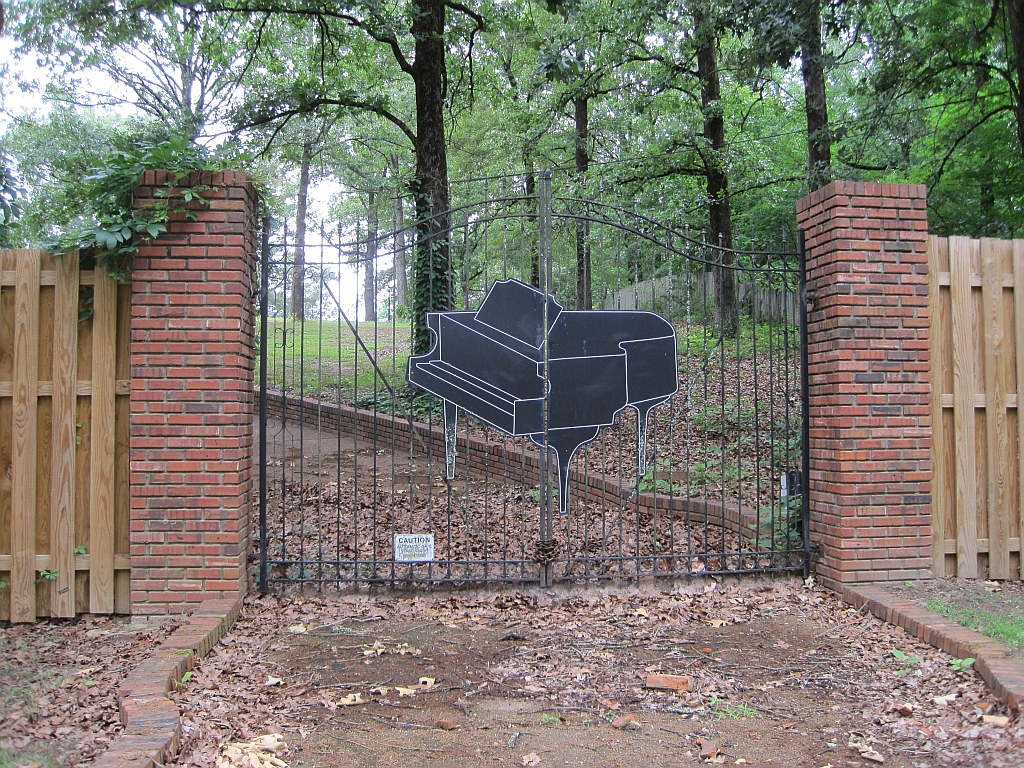
The gate to Lewis's ranch in Nesbit, Mississippi

In 1979, the Internal Revenue Service seized property from Lewis to compensate a $274,000 tax debt. The property included several automobiles, a tractor, five motorcycles, jewelry, musical instruments, home entertainment equipment, and firearms. In 1980, an auction was held, but only 150 potential bidders showed up. The auction amassed $91,382, a third of the debt.

In 1984, Lewis was found not guilty of evading taxes, but he still owed the IRS money. The next year, the IRS seized property from his Nesbit, Mississippi, ranch. In 1988, Lewis filed for bankruptcy, petitioning that he was more than $3 million in debt, including $2 million he owed to the IRS.

=== Final years and death ===
Lewis had a minor stroke in Memphis on February 28, 2019, which forced him to cancel several appearances. Lewis died at his home three years later on October 28, 2022, in Nesbit, Mississippi, at the age of 87. His death was mistakenly reported by TMZ two days before he died, with a representative stating that TMZ had reported "erroneously off of an anonymous tip." His funeral was held on November 5, 2022, in his hometown of Ferriday, Louisiana. The service was officiated by Jimmy Swaggart and Swaggart's son.

== Selected discography ==
- Jerry Lee Lewis (1958)
- Jerry Lee's Greatest! (1962)
- Live at the Star Club, Hamburg (1964)
- The Return of Rock (1965)
- Country Songs for City Folks/All Country (1965)
- Memphis Beat (1966)
- Soul My Way (1967)
- Another Place, Another Time (1968)
- She Still Comes Around (1969)
- Sings the Country Music Hall of Fame Hits, Vol. 1 (1969)
- Sings the Country Music Hall of Fame Hits, Vol. 2 (1969)
- The Golden Cream of the Country (1969)
- A Taste of Country (1969)
- She Even Woke Me Up to Say Goodbye (1970)
- There Must Be More to Love Than This (1971)
- Touching Home (1971)
- Would You Take Another Chance on Me? (1971)
- The Killer Rocks On (1972)
- Who's Gonna Play This Old Piano? (1972)
- The Session (1973)
- Sometimes a Memory Ain't Enough (1973)
- Southern Roots: Back Home to Memphis (1973)
- I-40 Country (1974)
- Boogie Woogie Country Man (1975)
- Odd Man In (1975)
- Country Class (1976)
- Country Memories (1977)
- Jerry Lee Keeps Rockin' (1978)
- Jerry Lee Lewis (1979)
- When Two Worlds Collide (1980)
- Killer Country (1980)
- My Fingers Do the Talkin' (1983)
- I Am What I Am (1984)
- Class of '55 (with Roy Orbison, Johnny Cash, and Carl Perkins) (1986)
- Young Blood (1995)
- Last Man Standing (2006)
- Last Man Standing Live (2007)
- Mean Old Man (2010)
- Rock and Roll Time (2014)
- The Boys from Ferriday [with Jimmy Swaggart, credited as Jimmy Lee & Jerry Lee] (2022)

=== Compositions ===
Lewis wrote or co-wrote the following songs: "End of the Road" (1956), "Lewis Boogie" (1956), "Pumpin' Piano Rock" (1957), "Friday Night" (1957), "High School Confidential" (1958), "Memory of You" (1958), "Baby Baby Bye Bye" (1960; although Discogs credits Jerry Lee Lewis and Huey "Piano" Smith as the songwriters, the song was copyrighted in 1960 as by Lewis Smith), "Lewis Workout" (1960), "He Took It Like a Man" (1963, from the 1967 album Soul My Way), "Baby, Hold Me Close" (1965) from the 1965 album The Return of Rock, "What a Heck of a Mess" (1966), "Lincoln Limousine" (1966), "Alvin" (1970), "Wall Around Heaven" from the 1972 album Who's Gonna Play This Old Piano?, "Rockin' Jerry Lee" (1980, the B-side of "Honky Tonk Stuff", from the album When Two Worlds Collide), "Pilot Baby" (1983), "Crown Victoria Custom '51" (1995), released as a Sire 45 single B-side, and "Ol' Glory" (2006) from the album Last Man Standing.
