= Always Remember =

Always Remember may refer to:

- Always Remember (album), a 1971 album by Bill Anderson
- "Always Remember" (Bill Anderson song), 1971
- "Always Remember" (Brian Culbertson song), 2008
