= Where Have All the Flowers Gone? =

Folk song written by Pete Seeger and Joe Hickerson

"Where Have All The Flowers Gone?"

Single by The Kingston Trio
- Released: December 1961
- Genre: Folk
- Length: 3:04
- Label: Capitol
- Songwriters: Pete Seeger and Joe Hickerson
- Producer: Voyle Gilmore

"Where Have All the Flowers Gone?" is a folk song written by American singer-songwriter Pete Seeger in 1955. Inspired lyrically by the traditional Cossack folk song "Koloda-Duda", Seeger borrowed an Irish melody for the music and published the first three verses in Sing Out! magazine. Additional verses were added in May 1960 by Joe Hickerson, who turned it into a circular song. Its rhetorical "where?" and meditation on death place the song in the ubi sunt tradition. In 2010, the New Statesman listed it as one of its selections of the "Top 20 Political Songs".

The 1962 album version of the song was released as part of the Columbia Records Hall of Fame 45 single series in 1965 as 13–33088. The recording of the song by Pete Seeger was inducted into the Grammy Hall of Fame in 2002 in the Folk category with the release year given as 1964 as a Columbia Records single. In June 2026, CBS News included the song in its list of the 250 essential American songs of the past 250 years.

== Composition ==
Seeger found inspiration for the song in October 1955 while he was on a plane bound for a concert at Oberlin College, one of the few venues that would hire him during the McCarthy era. Leafing through his notebook, he saw the passage, "Where are the flowers, the girls have plucked them. Where are the girls, they've all taken husbands. Where are the men, they're all in the army." These lines were taken from the traditional Cossack folk-song "Koloda-Duda" (Russian: Колода-дуда), referenced in the Mikhail Sholokhov novel And Quiet Flows the Don (1934), which Seeger had read "at least a year or two before". In a 2013 interview, Seeger explained that he borrowed the melody from an Irish lumberjack song with the words 'Johnson says he'll load more hay.' He simply slowed the tune and incorporated the lines into it.

He recorded and released a version with three verses on The Rainbow Quest album (Folkways LP FA 2454) in July 1960. Later, Joe Hickerson, then a graduate student who that summer became folk-music director at Camp Woodland in the Catskills, added two more verses with a recapitulation of the first in May 1960 in Bloomington, Indiana.

Seeger published the song in Sing Out in 1962 as a copyrighted composition.

The 1962 recording of the song appeared on the compilation album Pete Seeger's Greatest Hits (1967) released by Columbia Records as CS 9416.

Pete Seeger's recording from the Columbia album The Bitter and the Sweet (November 1962), CL 1916, produced by John H. Hammond, was also released as a Columbia Hall of Fame 45 single as 13-33088 backed by "Little Boxes" in August 1965.

== Versions ==
=== 1961−1964 ===
- The Kingston Trio recorded the song in 1961. Believing it to be a traditional song, they claimed authorship, although upon notice from Seeger, they had their name removed and credited Seeger and Hickerson. Seeger acknowledged their success with this song.
- The Landsmen released the song in 1961 as a 45 rpm single on Arvee.
- Peter, Paul and Mary included the song on their eponymous debut album (which spent five weeks as the number-one album in the United States) in 1962.
- Marlene Dietrich performed the song in English, French, and German. The song was first performed in French (as "Où vont les fleurs") (French lyrics by Francis Lemarque and Robert Rouzaud) by Dietrich in 1962 at a UNICEF concert and released on the EP "Marlène" in July 1962. Her German rendition was titled "Sag mir, wo die Blumen sind", with lyrics translated by Max Colpet, which she performed on a tour of Israel, where she was warmly received. Dietrich was the first performer to break the taboo of publicly using the German language in Israel since the Second World War. The single "Sag Mir, Wo Die Blumen Sind" was released in Germany in September 1962. The UK music weekly Record Mirror published a highly favourable review of the German-language version in August 1963. It praised Dietrich's performance, noting that while she delivered it in her "curious, staccato style," she nonetheless managed to extract "the maximum warmth and emotion" from the song. In March 1964, Dietrich's English-language version of the song was released in the US (as a 7" single) and in the UK (on the EP "Marlene Dietrich Returns To Germany").
- Dalida (1933−1987), an Italian-French singer, also recorded the song in French as "Que sont devenues les fleurs?", adapted by Guy Béart in 1962 (Les Années Barclay, vol. 5, 1962).
- The Folkswingers recorded an instrumental version of the song for their second album 12 String Guitar! Vol. 2 (1963).
- Jaap Fischer recorded the song in Dutch as "Zeg me waar de bloemen zijn" (single, B side of "Jan Soldaat", 1963).
- Conny van den Bos (1937−2002) recorded the song in Dutch "Waar zijn al die bloemen toch?", released 1963.
- The Searchers released their version on the album Meet the Searchers, released in June 1963.
- The Springfields featuring Dusty Springfield released a version in German in 1963.
- Bobby Darin (1936−1973) recorded the song on the Golden Folk Hits album on Capitol, 2007, which was released in November 1963.
- Eddy Arnold and The Needmore Creek Singers recorded the song on October 9, 1963, and released it on the Folk Song Book album released in January 1964.
- Erzsi Kovács (1928−2014), a Hungarian pop singer, recorded a version in Hungarian in 1964.
- Heli Lääts (1932−2018), an Estonian concert singer, recorded a version in Estonian in 1964, with the title "Kuhu küll kõik lilled jäid?"
- Vera Lynn (1917−2020) recorded the song as the 11th cut on her 1964 album Among My Souvenirs.
- The Brothers Four recorded the song on their 1964 LP More Big Folk Hits, Columbia Records, CL-2213.
- The Four Seasons recorded the song on their 1964 Philips album Born to Wander, PHM 200 129.
- Lars Lönndahl recorded the song in 1964 with Swedish lyrics Inga blommor finns det mer, translated in 1962 by Beppe Wolgers.
- A Czech-language version of the song ("Řekni, kde ty kytky jsou") was also created and recorded by several popular artists, such as Judita Čeřovská (1964), Marie Rottrová, or Marta Kubišová. Čeřovská's version was one of the OST songs of the 2001 Czech film Rebelové.

=== 1965−1969 ===
- Joan Baez included the German version (Sagt mir wo die Blumen sind) on her 1965 album Farewell Angelina.
- Johnny Rivers had a 1965 U.S. top-40 hit with a folk rock version, reaching number 26 on the Billboard Hot 100 and number 9 in Canada.
- Grady Martin released an instrumental version in 1965 on his Instrumentally Yours album.
- The Lennon Sisters recorded a vocal pop version on their 1965 album Our Favorite Songs.
- Harry Belafonte has made one recording of it at a benefit concert in Stockholm, Sweden, 1966 on the album BEL-1.
- Sława Przybylska (born 1931), a Polish singer, recorded a version in Polish in 1966, with the title Gdzie są kwiaty z tamtych lat?
- Walter Jackson recorded a R&B version in Chicago for Okeh Records in 1967.
- Lester Flatt and Earl Scruggs included the song on their 1968 album Changin' Times.
- Jazz guitarist Wes Montgomery recorded an instrumental version in his trademark style on the 1968 LP Road Song.
- The Chambers Brothers recorded the song for their 1968 album A New Time – A New Day.
- The Peddlers recorded a studio version of the song for their 1969 album Birthday.
- In 1969, Rufus Harley recorded a jazz instrumental version on his trademark bagpipes, but the track was never commercially released until it was included in his posthumously released, limited-edition collection Courage – The Atlantic Recordings in 2006.
- The Yarkon Bridge Trio recorded in 1965 the Hebrew version, written by Haim Hefer, in their album First Love.

=== 1970−1979 ===
- Roy Orbison recorded a version of the song, which appears on the album The Connoisseur's Orbison (1970).
- American country singer Bill Anderson recorded the song on his December, 1970 album Where Have All Our Heroes Gone, and on his eponymous 1971 album.
- American R&B band Earth, Wind & Fire covered the song on the 1972 album Last Days and Time.
- Richie Havens recorded the song in 1972.
- Alberto Y Lost Trios Paranoias, an English comedy rock band, included a version on their 1978 album Skite.
- The Hi-Marks, a popular 1970s group in New Zealand, recorded a version on their first album Showtime Spectacular (1979).
- Patty Pravo published an Italian version ( Dove andaranno i nostri fiori) in her 'Tanto' album in 1978.

=== 1980−1989 ===
- Yellow Magic Orchestra recorded the song in 1980 and released it in the 1999 compilation album YMO GO HOME!
- Hannes Wader recorded a German version as the final track for his 1982 album Daß nichts bleibt wie es war.
- City, a then-East German rock band formed in East Berlin in 1972, recorded a German-language version in their 1983 album Unter der Haut.
- Bernie Sanders covered the song on his 1987 album We Shall Overcome.

=== 1990−1999 ===
- Croatian folk band Zlatni Dukati performed a version of the song entitled "Iznad polja makova" ("Above the fields of poppy") during the Croatian War of Independence (1991−1995), and recorded the song in their 1991 album U Meni Hrvatska.
- Serbian actor Dragan Maksimović performed a part of this song in the movie Mi nismo anđeli ("We are not Angels") recorded in 1992 in Yugoslavia.
- British folk-rock group The Tansads included a version on their 1995 live album Drag Down the Moon.
- Scottish-Nigerian singer-songwriter Nicolette covered the song on her 1996 album Let No-One Live Rent Free in Your Head.
- Kabir Suman translated the song to Bengali ("Kothaye Gelo Tara"). Suman and Seeger performed the English and Bengali versions one after the other twice during their Tour of Kolkata in 1996.
- A Russian version of the song was recorded in 1998 by Oleg Nesterov, a lead singer of Megapolis, and later performed in duet with Masha Makarova (of the rock band Masha i Medvedi) in a music video.
- Irish folk band The Fureys recorded it for their albums Twenty One Years On (1999) and The Times They Are a Changing (2014)

=== 2000−2009 ===
- A Polish-language version was sung by Sława Przybylska (Polish title: "Gdzie są kwiaty z tamtych lat?"). The song was released on the 2001 compilation album Pamiętasz Była Jesień.
- Adhunik Bengali singer Anjan Dutt covered the song in his 2001 album Rawng Pencil.
- Green Day thematically and lyrically mimic the song on the track "Letterbomb" from the 2004 album American Idiot.
- Olivia Newton-John recorded the song on her 2004 album Indigo: Women of Song.
- Country singer Dolly Parton has also recorded a rendition of the song, on her 2005 album Those Were the Days.
- Chris de Burgh has recorded a version, which is featured on his 2008 album Footsteps.
- The song was sung at the funeral of Harry Patch, the last British soldier of the First World War, in Wells Cathedral on August 9, 2009.
- A piano version of the song by Scottish pop singer and songwriter Jimmy Somerville appears on his 2009 album Suddenly Last Summer.
- Classical guitarist Sharon Isbin recorded an instrumental version in her 2009 album Journey to the New World.

=== 2010−2019 ===
- Danish-German songwriter and entrepreneur Kirsten Hasberg, of Kassel, Germany, recorded a parody entitled "Sag, die Energiewende, wo ist sie geblieben?" about the German transition to renewable energies and "energy democracy" (2012).
- Lara Veronin, a Russian-Taiwanese-American singer, recorded a version for the 2012 Taiwanese drama Alice in Wonder City.
- German avant-garde group Einstürzende Neubauten recorded a German version of the song for their 2014 album Lament.
- The Armistice Pals recorded a version in 2014 that was released as a commemoration of the 100th anniversary of World War One, and as a tribute to Pete Seeger, who had died earlier that year. The voice of Pete Seeger is heard in the recording along with that of his half-sister Peggy Seeger.

=== 2020−present ===
- Canadian singer-songwriter Pierre Lapointe recorded the German version ("Sag mir wo die Blumen sind?") for his 2022 album L'heure mauve.
- Russian actress and director Renata Litvinova performed a recitative on Russian ("Когда же Вы наконец поймёте?") over Marlene Dietrich's singing as a background, which can be an act against the Russian invasion of Ukraine (2022).
- Greek singer-songwriter Vasiliki Nika recorded the Greek version ("Τα λουλούδια χάθηκαν"). The video directed by Alexandros N. V. refers to the Kalavryta massacre.
- Belarusian singer-songwriter and artist Lavon Volski recorded the version in Belarusian "Dzie kvietki?" ("Дзе Кветкі?") in 2022. The video directed by Ihar Nazaranka contains drawings made by Lavon Volski himself.

== Foreign-language titles ==
Version	Title	Artist
Basque	Loreak non dira?	Lou Topet, Harkaitz Cano
Belarusian	Дзе кветкі ўсе?	Bar Akaryna
Belarusian	Дзе кветкі? (Dzie kvietki?)	Lavon Volski
Bengali	version 1 Phul guli kothay gelo	Hemanga Biswas
Bengali	কোথায় গেল তারা? (Kothay Tara)	Kabir Suman
Catalan	Què se n'ha fet d'aquelles flors?	Roslyn Smith, La Marta (Club Super3)
Chinese	花兒怎麼不見了?	Poon Sow Keng (潘秀瓊)
Croatian	Kamo je cvijeće otišlo?	Monia Verardi
Czech	Řekni, kde ty kytky jsou	Judita Čeřovská, Marie Rottrová, Marta Kubišová
Danish	Where Have All the Flowers Gone	Savage Rose
Dutch	Zeg me waar de bloemen zijn	Jaap Fischer
Esperanto	Ĉiuj floroj estas for	Duo Espera
Estonian	Kuhu küll kõik lilled jäid	Heli Lääts
Finnish	Minne kukat kadonneet	Kukonpojat
French	Qui peut dire où vont les fleurs? Que sont devenues les fleurs?	Eva, Marlene Dietrich, Francis Lemarque, Dalida
German	Sag mir, wo die Blumen sind Sagt mir, wo die Blumen sind (Joan Baez)	Marlene Dietrich, Hannes Wader, Juliane Werding, Nana Mouskouri, Joan Baez, Lolita, Hildegard Knef, Einstürzende Neubauten
Greece	Τα λουλούδια χάθηκαν The flowers were lost	Βασιλική Νίκα (Vasiliki Nika)
Hebrew	איפה הפרחים כולם (eifo haprachim kulam)	שלישיית גשר הירקון (Yarkon Bridge Trio)
Hungarian	Hova tűnt a sok virág?	Mária Mezei, Péter Gerendás, Erzsi Kovács, Éva Csepregi
Icelandic	Hvert er farið blómið blátt?	Elly Vilhjálms & Ragnar Bjarnason
Irish	Cá bhfuil siad uainn, scoth na mbláth?	Feargal Ó Béarra
Italian	Dove andranno i nostri fiori?	Patty Pravo
Japanese	Hana wa doko e itta?	Kiyoshiro Imawano
Polish	Gdzie są kwiaty z tamtych lat?	Sława Przybylska
Portuguese	Para onde foram todas as flores	Jarmila Ferreira Martins
Romanian	Unde au dispărut toate florile	Alexandru Constantinescu
Russian	Где цветы, дай мне ответ? (Gde cvety, day mne otvet?)	Oleg Nesterov, Masha Makarova
Russian	Ты скажи мне, где цветы (Ty skazhi mne, gde tsvety)	Zhanna Bichevskaya
Slovenian	Kam so šle vse rožice	Tomaž Domicelj
Spanish	¿Dónde están las flores?	Rolando Alarcón, Bárbara y Dick, Los Holiday's, Jorge Hernan
Swedish	Inga blommor finns det mer	Lars Lönndahl
Turkish	Söyle Çiçekler nerde?	Oğuz Tarihmen
Ukrainian	Де всі квіти, розкажи (De vsi kvity, rozkazhy)	Maria Burmaka
Ukrainian	Квіти де? Kvity De?	Yana Zavarzina

== Grammy Hall of Fame ==
Pete Seeger's recording of his composition was inducted into the Grammy Hall of Fame, which is a special Grammy award established in 1973 to honor recordings that are at least 25 years old and that have "qualitative or historical significance".

Pete Seeger: Grammy Hall of Fame Awards
Year recorded	Title	Genre	Label	Year inducted
1964	"Where Have All the Flowers Gone?"	Folk (single)	Columbia	2002

== See also ==
- List of anti-war songs

== Bibliography ==
- Seeger, Pete; Blood, Peter (1993). Where have all the flowers gone : a singer's stories, songs, seeds, robberies (Biography). Bethlehem, Pennsylvania: Sing Out!. pp. 166–169. ISBN 978-1-881322-01-6. OCLC 28150656.
