= If You Give a Mouse a Cookie (TV series) =

American animated children's television series

- Based on: If You Give a Mouse a Cookie illlustrated by Felicia Bond and written by Laura Numeroff
- Directed by: Emmanuelle Gignac
- Voices of: Mason Mahay; Roger Craig Smith; Lara Jill Miller; Jeff Bennett; Jessica DiCicco; Kyla Kenedy; Henry Kaufman; Benji Risley; Scarlett Estevez
- Theme music composer: Lisa Loeb; Richard Jacques; Kyler England
- Countries of origin: Canada; United States
- Original language: English
- No. of seasons: 2
- No. of episodes: 53 (103 segments)

Production
- Executive producers: Ken Scarborough; Laura Numeroff; Felicia Bond; Clint Eland
- Producer: Chantal Ling
- Running time: 30 minutes
- Production companies: Mercury Filmworks; Kuboaa!; Amazon Studios

Original release
- Network: Amazon Video (United States); Knowledge Network (Canada)
- Release: November 4, 2015 – October 14, 2021

If You Give a Mouse a Cookie is an animated children's adventure comedy television series based on the 1985 book of the same name. The pilot was originally released on November 4, 2015; the series officially debuted on Amazon Video on November 7, 2017.

The show was preceded by a Christmas special If You Give a Mouse a Christmas Cookie, which was released on November 24, 2016. The second season was released on September 27, 2019, with a Halloween special If You Give a Mouse a Pumpkin being released on October 25, 2019; a Valentine's Day special If You Give a Mouse a Valentine's Cookie was released on February 7, 2020. The series finale was released on October 14, 2021.

== Premise ==
Based on the book series of the same name by Laura Numeroff and Felicia Bond, If You Give a Mouse a Cookie follows the daily adventures of Mouse, Pig, Moose, Dog, and Cat, as well as their several humans.

== Characters ==
- Oliver (voiced by Mason Mahay)
- Mouse (voiced by Roger Craig Smith)
- Piper (voiced by Kyla Kenedy)
- Pig (voiced by Jessica DiCicco)
- Henry (voiced by Henry Kaufman)
- Dog (voiced by Jeff Bennett)
- Leo (voiced by Benji Risley)
- Moose (voiced by Roger Craig Smith)
- Esme Louise (voiced by Scarlett Estevez)
- Cat (voiced by Lara Jill Miller)
- Oliver's Mom (voiced by Colleen O'Shaughnessey)

== Production ==
Singer-songwriter Lisa Loeb provided original music for the series, composing 13 tracks for season one and another six for season two. All songs were made available to stream on Amazon Music. Loeb noted that head writer Ken Scarborough wrote most of the lyrics for her songs.

== Episodes ==
=== Season 1 (2015–19) ===
No. overall	No. in season	Title	Original release date
1	1	"Applesauce/Cat and Mouse"	November 4, 2015
2	2	"If You Give a Mouse a Christmas Cookie"	November 24, 2016
3	3	"Masked Mouse (Mouse to the Rescue!)/Art Chase (The Amazing Art Chase)"	November 7, 2017
4	4	"The Big Campout/Missing Sock!"	November 7, 2017
5	5	"Hoopla!/Animal Band"	November 7, 2017
6	6	"Mouse Minds the Store/Captain Mouse"	November 7, 2017
7	7	"Town Fair/Beach Day"	November 7, 2017
8	8	"School Day (If You Take a Mouse to School)/Cookie Factory"	November 7, 2017
9	9	"Muffin Party/Arcade"	November 7, 2017
10	10	"A House for Mouse/Delivery Mouse"	November 7, 2017
11	11	"Gotta Fix Squawky/Sick Day"	November 7, 2017
12	12	"Dinosaur Mystery/Inventor Fair"	November 7, 2017
13	13	"Farm Friends/Picnic"	November 7, 2017
14	14	"Toy Round Up!/Masked Mouse Mobile"	November 7, 2017
15	15	"Recycle Races/Change is Good"	June 25, 2018
16	16	"Dog's Day Out/Doggie Day Camp"	June 25, 2018
17	17	"Treasure Hunt!/A Surprise for Henry"	June 25, 2018
18	18	"Sledding Adventure/Snowy Sleepover"	June 25, 2018
19	19	"Mouse Around/Rainy Day"	June 25, 2018
20	20	"Day at the Museum/Pizza Delivery"	June 25, 2018
21	21	"Friendaversary/Runaway Robot"	February 14, 2019
22	22	"Mousey Mail/Lost Sticker"	February 14, 2019
23	23	"Bowling Bonanza!/Underwater Mouse"	February 14, 2019
24	24	"Charm Mystery/New Neighbor"	February 14, 2019
25	25	"Egg Hunt/The Masked Mouse Rides Again"	February 14, 2019
26	26	"Keeping Cool/Parade Day"	February 14, 2019
27	27	"Quest for the Cup/Goodnight Mouse"	February 14, 2019

=== Season 2 (2019–21) ===
No. overall	No. in season	Title	Original release date
28	1	"Looking After Lovey/The Old Shell Game"	September 27, 2019
29	2	"A Space Odd-issy/Stuff-on-a-Stick"	September 27, 2019
30	3	"Pig Puts on a Show/A Little Pig Pizazz"	September 27, 2019
31	4	"A Token of Friendship/Robot Rivalry"	September 27, 2019
32	5	"Hiccup Hutch/Do the Dog"	September 27, 2019
33	6	"If You Give a Mouse a Pumpkin"	October 25, 2019
34	7	"If You Give a Mouse a Valentine's Day Cookie"	February 7, 2020
35	8	"Picnic Express/Safari Express"	July 23, 2020
36	9	"The Caped Moose/Leo's Loose Tooth"	July 23, 2020
37	10	"Dog vs. the Two-Wheeler/If You Give a Dog a Bath"	July 23, 2020
38	11	"Dinosaurs for a Day/Magical Moose"	July 23, 2020
39	12	"Snowy the Snowbot/Saturn's Missing Rings"	July 23, 2020
40	13	"Mouse and the Toy Factory/Teacher Appreciation Day"	July 23, 2020
41	14	"The Quest for the Golden Treasure/Firefighter Mouse"	March 25, 2021
42	15	"Carnival Time/Summertastic Day"	March 25, 2021
43	16	"Copydog/Sweet Dreams"	March 25, 2021
44	17	"Mother's Day Mouse/If You Give a Mouse a Camera"	March 25, 2021
45	18	"Cousin Party/Quiet Contest"	March 25, 2021
46	19	"Sleepover Slip-up/Dancing in Style"	March 25, 2021
47	20	"The Haunted Toolshed/Backyard Obstacle Course"	October 14, 2021
48	21	"Piper's Circus Surprise/Friendship Flower Power"	October 14, 2021
49	22	"Chalk-Tastrophe/Gell Well, Oliver"	October 14, 2021
50	23	"Messy Guest/Catchy Tune"	October 14, 2021
51	24	"Masked Mouse: The Ultimate Challenge/Door-to-Door Dilemma"	October 14, 2021
52	25	"Super Super Superheroes/Princess-Cowgirl-Pirate Pig"	October 14, 2021
53	26	"Mouse Day Celebration/Mouse and the Cookiestalk"	October 14, 2021
