= Bill Anderson's Greatest Hits, Vol. 2 =

Compilation album by Bill Anderson
- Released: September 1971
- Genres: Country; Nashville Sound
- Label: Decca
- Producer: Owen Bradley

Bill Anderson chronology
Always Remember (1971)	Bill Anderson's Greatest Hits, Vol. 2 (1971)	Bill and Jan (Or Jan and Bill) (1972)

Singles from Bill Anderson's Greatest Hits, Vol. 2
- 1. "Quits" Released: July 1971

Bill Anderson's Greatest Hits, Vol. 2 is a compilation album by American country singer-songwriter Bill Anderson. It was released in September 1971 on Decca Records and was produced by Owen Bradley. The record was Anderson's fourth compilation released in his recording career and contained one single that became a major hit in 1971. The album itself included some his biggest hits from the era.

== Background and content ==
Bill Anderson's Greatest Hits, Vol. 2 was Anderson's second greatest hits album package released at the Decca label. The sessions were all produced by Owen Bradley, whom was his long time producer at the label. A total of 11 tracks were included on the album package. The songs chosen were recorded and had mostly been hits for Anderson between 1967 and 1971. These songs included the number one hit "My Life (Throw It Away If I Want To)" and the top five hits "Wild Week-End," "Happy State of Mind," "Get While the Gettin's Good" and "Love Is a Sometimes Thing." One new track was included called "Quits." It served as the album's opening tune.

== Release ==
Bill Anderson's Greatest Hits, Vol. 2 was released in September 1971 on Decca Records. It became Anderson's fourth compilation effort released in his recording career. His first was issued in 1962. The record was issued as a vinyl LP, containing six songs on side one and five songs on side two. The record spent a total of 15 weeks on the Billboard Top Country Albums before peaking at number 18 in January 1972. Unlike his previous compilation, the album spawned one new track as a single to radio. The lead track "Quits" was issued as a single release in July 1971. Spending 17 weeks on the Billboard Hot Country Singles chart, "Quits" peaked at number three in September 1971. The single also became a major hit in Canada, reaching number two on the RPM Country Songs chart.

== Track listing ==
Side one
No.	Title	Writer(s)	Length
1.	"Quits"	Bill Anderson	2:24
2.	"No One's Gonna Hurt You Anymore"	Ted Cooper; Steve Karliski	2:35
3.	"My Life (Throw It Away If I Want To)"	Anderson	2:40
4.	"Always Remember"	Jerry Bradley; Patsy Lawley	2:35
5.	"Wild Week-End"	Anderson	2:22
6.	"Where Have All Our Heroes Gone"	Anderson; Bob Talbert	4:59

Side two
No.	Title	Writer(s)	Length
1.	"Get While the Gettin's Good"	Anderson	2:32
2.	"Me"	Alex Zanetis	2:12
3.	"But You Know I Love You"	Mike Settle	2:50
4.	"Love Is a Sometimes Thing"	Jan Howard	2:54
5.	"Happy State of Mind"	Anderson	2:25

== Personnel ==
All credits are adapted from the liner notes of Bill Anderson's Greatest Hits, Vol. 2.

Musical and technical personnel

- Bill Anderson – lead vocals
- Owen Bradley – producer
- Hal Buksbaum – cover photo

== Chart performance ==
Chart (1971–1972)	Peak position
US Top Country Albums (Billboard)	18

== Release history ==
Region	Date	Format	Label	Ref.
Canada	September 1971	Vinyl	Decca Records	
United States	September 1971	Vinyl	Decca Records	
