= Cuddle+kind =

American Toy Company

- Industry: Manufacturing
- Founded: 2015
- Founder: Jennifer Woodgate
- Products: Dolls

Cuddle + kind is a doll manufacturing company started in 2015 that produces handmade dolls for children.

== Overview ==
Cuddle + kind was founded by Jennifer Woodgate and her husband, Derek. The dolls are made by artisans in Peru and offers them a fair trade wage. Each doll has a name, a story and a birth date attached to it and the company has the goal of providing one million meals a year to hungry children. The company has partnered with the World Food Programme, pledging to provide at least 10 meals to children in need through the World Food Program USA and other programs for every doll purchased. As of 2025, the company has contributed more than $4.25 million to the World Food Program USA.

== Recognition ==
In 2016, the company received the Oppenheim Toy Portfolio Best Toy Award. In 2018, the company won the National Parenting Products Awards.
