= Kornacki =

Kornacki (Polish pronunciation: [kɔrˈnat͡ski]; feminine: Kornacka; plural: Kornaccy) is a surname. Notable people with the surname include:

- Ryszard Kornacki (born 1940), Polish poet and writer
- Steve Kornacki (born 1979), American journalist, writer and television host
- Helena Boguszewska (Helena Boguszewska-Kornacka) (1886–1978), Polish writer
