= We Shall Overcome (disambiguation) =

"We Shall Overcome" is a protest song of the civil rights movement.

We Shall Overcome may also refer to:

- We Shall Overcome (Pete Seeger album), an album by Pete Seeger
- We Shall Overcome (Bernie Sanders album), an album by Bernie Sanders
- We Shall Overcome: The Seeger Sessions, a studio album by Bruce Springsteen
- We Shall Overcome: Sacred Song on the Devil's Tongue, a book by Isaias Gamboa about the history of the song "We Shall Overcome"
- We Shall Overcome (film), a 2006 film
