= Laura Numeroff =

American author and illustrator (born 1953)

- Born: Laura Joffe Numeroff; July 14, 1953 (age 73); New York City, U.S.
- Education: Pratt Institute
- Occupation: Author
- Writing career
- Genre: Children's stories
- Website: www.lauranumeroff.com

Laura Joffe Numeroff (born July 14, 1953) is an American author and illustrator of children's books who is best known as the author of If You Give a Mouse a Cookie.

== Early life ==
Numeroff was born in Brooklyn, New York, the youngest of three girls. By the age of nine, she had decided she wanted to be a writer when she grew up. She credits her current profession to two childhood favorites, saying that they "are the reason" she is a writer: E. B. White's Stuart Little and Kay Thompson's Eloise.

Numeroff attended Pratt Institute, where she initially studied fashion. Realizing fashion "wasn't for her", she returned to her childhood dream of becoming a writer and took a course in illustrating and writing children's books. A homework assignment prompted Numeroff to write and illustrate Amy for Short, about the tallest girl in third grade. Before graduating from Pratt in 1975, Amy For Short was published by Macmillan Publishing.

== Career ==
Numeroff's first nine books were both written and illustrated by Numeroff herself.

Numeroff has worked with illustrators including Lynn Munsinger, David McPhail, Tim Bowers, Nate Evans, Joe Mathieu, Sal Murdocca, Sharleen Collicott and Felicia Bond; Felicia Bond is the illustrator of the If You Give . . . series.

Phoebe Dexter Has Harriet Peterson's Sniffles, published in January 1977, tells the tale of Phoebe Dexter who is stuck at home because she is sick. Upset that she is missing all the happenings of her school day, Phoebe busies herself pretending she is a dog and eventually playing Go Fish with her grandmother who comes over to keep her company. The book is both written and illustrated by Numeroff.

When the manuscript for If You Give A Mouse A Cookie was bought by HarperCollins after nine rejections, Numeroff's editor chose Felicia Bond to illustrate. When asked about her earlier endeavors into illustrations during an interview, she mentioned that though she loves drawing, she decided her "strength was in writing and not in illustration" and said "I don't think I would illustrate a whole book anymore at this point."

Her autobiography, If You Give an Author a Pencil, was published in 2003; it was written at a second-grade reading level so that it is accessible to children. Numeroff's books have been published in many languages.

== Personal life ==
Numeroff lives in Los Angeles, California.

== Themes in her series ==
=== If You Give... ===
If You Give a Mouse a Cookie, published in 1985 and illustrated by Felicia Bond, was the book that launched the hit If You Give... series. It was rejected by publishers nine times before it was finally accepted by Harper. These stories use a circular story format, presenting to the reader a chain of events. At the end of the story, the reader discovers that the characters have ended up at the same transaction that they started with. The entire story is an "If ____________ , then ___________" scenario. If You Give a Mouse a Cookie led to other books about a moose, a cat, a pig, and a dog.

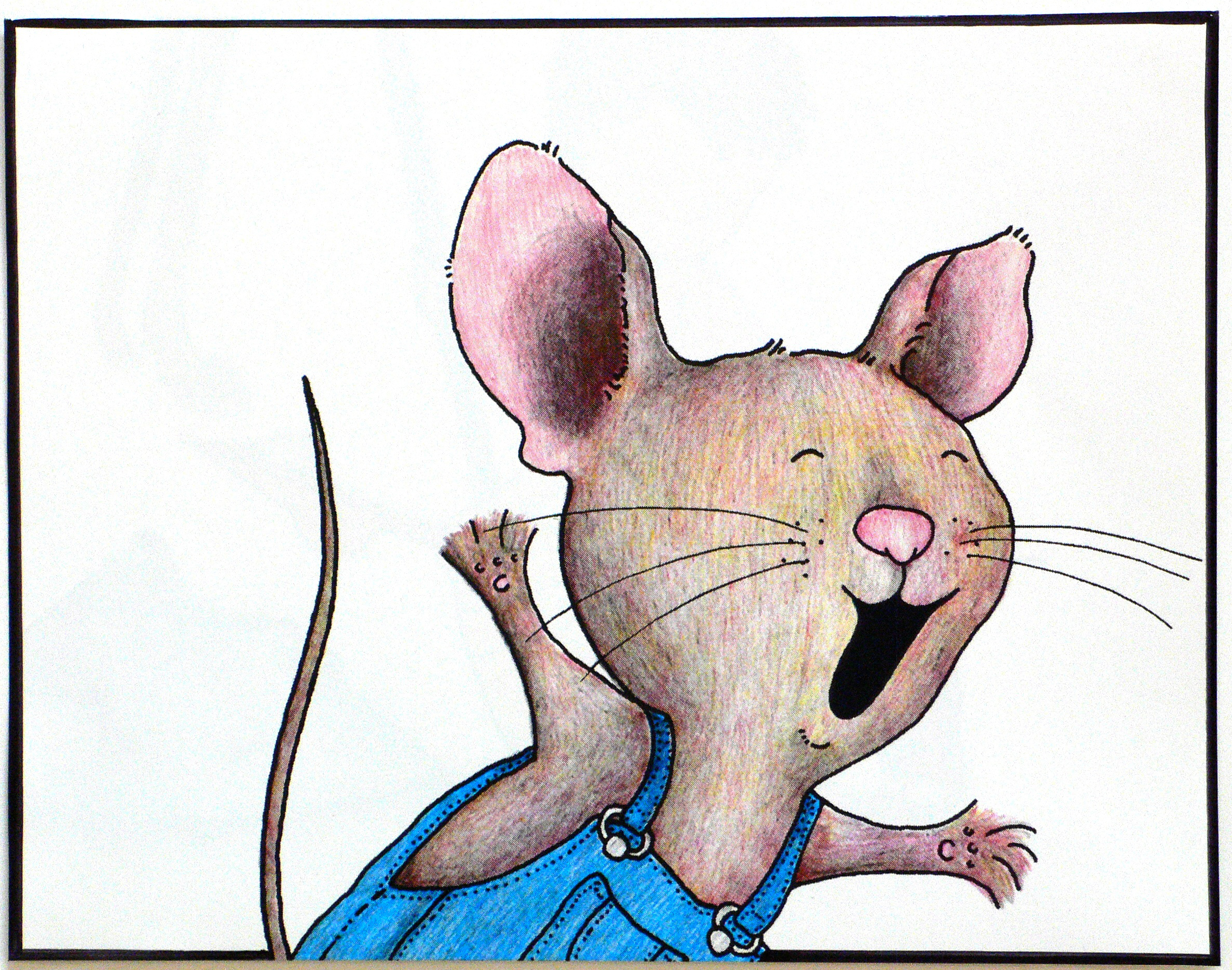
Mouse

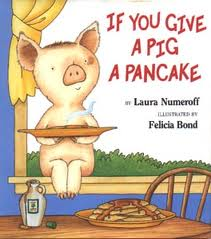
Pig

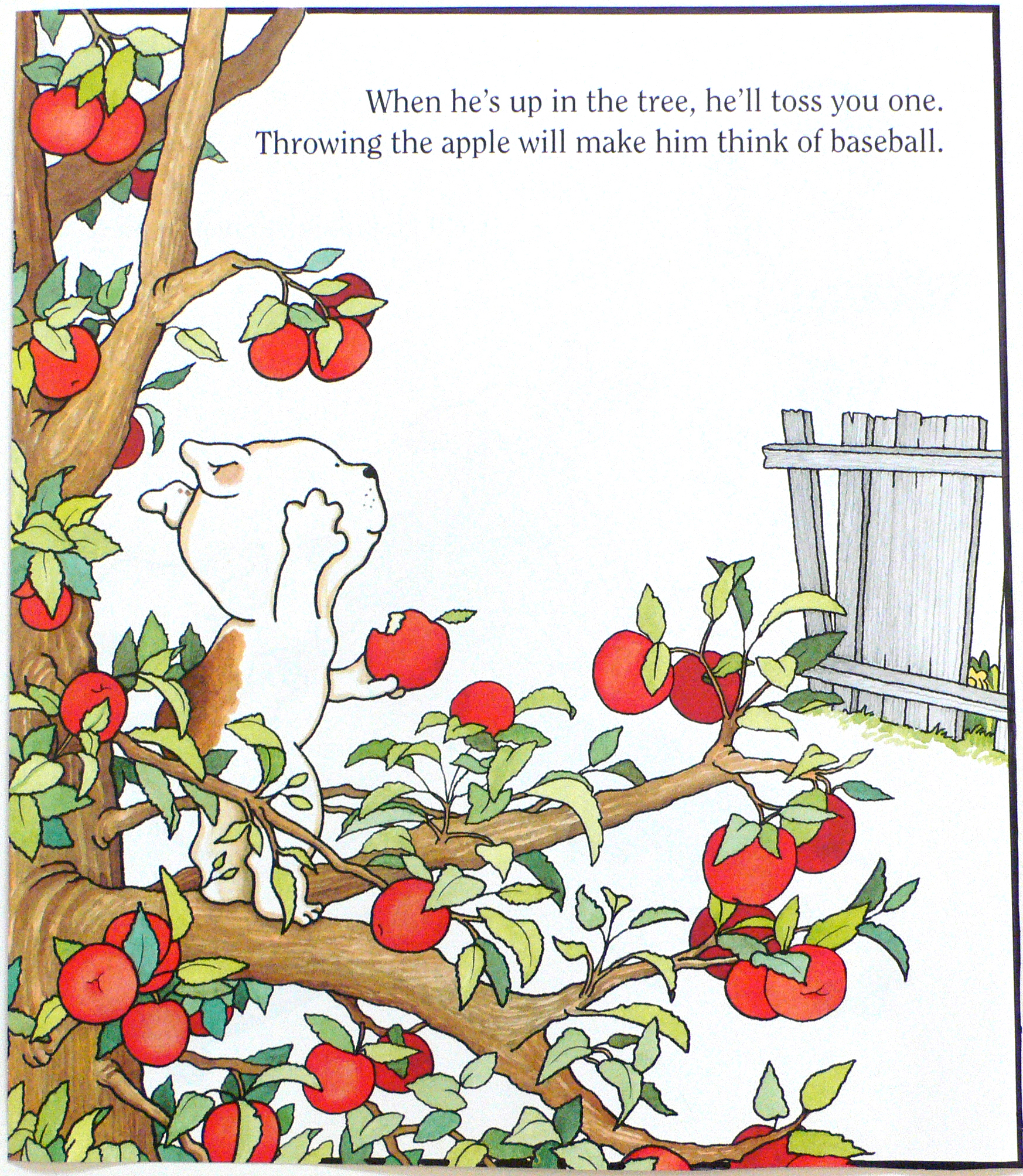
Dog

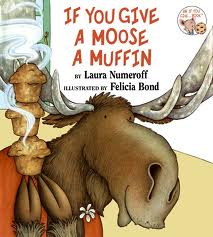
Moose

=== What...Do Best ===
The first book in this series by Numeroff, What Mommies Do Best/What Daddies Do Best, published in April 2008, was illustrated, in watercolors, by Lynn Munsinger. The series was written for children ages 4 – 8.

This children's book is a two part story. On one side of the book is What Mommies Do Best. This book demonstrates many of the things that mothers do, such as give piggyback rides, teach children how to ride a bicycle, and sew a button on a teddy bear.

Following What Mommies Do Best, the book can be flipped to reveal What Daddies Do Best. This side illustrates things that fathers do with their children. The stories are identical. Both parents do the same things in each book. Subsequent books are about grandparents, aunts and uncles.

=== The Jellybeans ===
Bitsy, a pig wearing purple, loves to draw, color, paint and make art. Emily, a dog wearing pink, loves to dance. Anna, a rabbit wearing yellow, loves to read books. Nicole, a cat wearing blue, loves to play soccer. The first letters of their names spell the word "BEAN", and they love jellybeans, their favorite candy from Petunia's, their favorite place.

=== Other works ===
An animal lover, Numeroff had always wanted to write a book about service dogs. In 2016, Numeroff and co-creator Sean Hanrahan released Raising a Hero, illustrated by Lynn Munsinger. The book is about a young boy raising a puppy to become a service dog in order to help children with disabilities. Proceeds from Raising a Hero supported Canine Companions, a non-profit devoted to training service dogs for people with disabilities.

Laura Numeroff's Ten Step Guide to Living with Your Monster, illustrated by Nate Evans, was published in April 2002 and was intended for children aged 4 to 8. The book explains to readers how to make a monster a good pet, rather than being afraid of monsters. A portion of the profits from the book were donated to The Michael J. Fox Foundation for Parkinson's Research.

== Awards and recognition ==
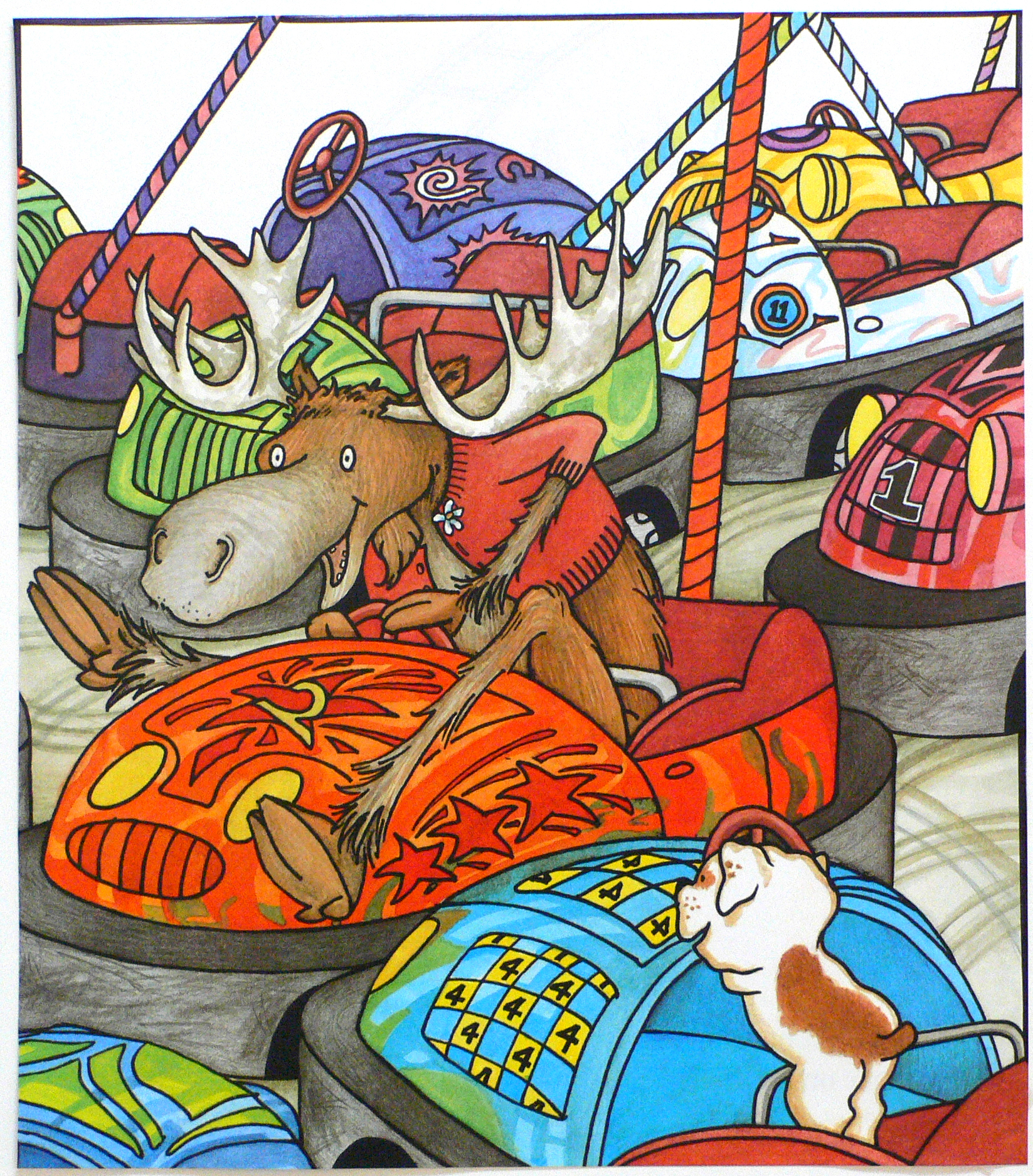
From If You Give a Pig a Party

Numeroff has won numerous awards as author of the If You Give... series, including:

Book	Award and Year
If You Give a Mouse a Cookie	Alabama Children's Choice Book Award, K–1 (1986–87)
If You Give a Mouse a Cookie	California Young Reader Medal (1988)
If You Give a Mouse a Cookie	Colorado Children's Book Award (1988)
If You Give a Mouse a Cookie	Georgia Children's Picture Story Book Award (1988)
If You Give a Mouse a Cookie	Nevada Young Readers' Award (1988–89)
If You Give a Mouse a Cookie	Buckeye Children's Book Award, K–2 (Ohio) (1989)
If You Give a Mouse a Cookie	Oppenheim Toy Portfolio Platinum Award (1994)
If You Give a Mouse a Cookie	Oppenheim Toy Portfolio Gold Award (1994)
If You Give a Mouse a Cookie	Oppenheim Toy Portfolio Blue Chip Classic Award (1994)
If You Give A Moose A Muffin	Children's Choices (IRA/CBC) (1992)
If You Give A Moose A Muffin	Oppenheim Toy Portfolio Gold Award (1998)
If You Give A Pig A Pancake	Oppenheim Platinum Award (1999)
If You Give A Pig A Pancake	IRA Children's Choice (1999)
If You Give A Pig A Pancake	Oprah Winfrey named If You Give a Pig a Pancake her "favorite book for children"
If You Give A Pig A Pancake	Listed on Oprah Winfrey's "Oprah’s Favorite Things from A-Z"
If You Take A Mouse To The Movies	NAPPA Gold Award (2000)
If You Take A Mouse To The Movies	Oppenheim Toy Portfolio Platinum Award (2001)
If You Take A Mouse To The Movies	IRA/CBC Children's Choice (2001)
If You Take A Mouse To School	Oppenheim Toy Portfolio Gold Award (2003)
If You Give A Pig A Party	Quill Award (2006)

Laura Bush invited Numeroff and Bond to the White House to be honored at the Presidential Inauguration "NEA Teacher’s Picks Books to Read Across America" in 1999 plus for the If You Give... series at the "Laura Bush Celebrates American Authors" in 2001.

Numeroff has also won awards for her individual stories, including the Milner Award in 2006 for If You Give a Mouse a Cookie & What Grandmas do Best.

== Works ==
=== If You Give... series ===
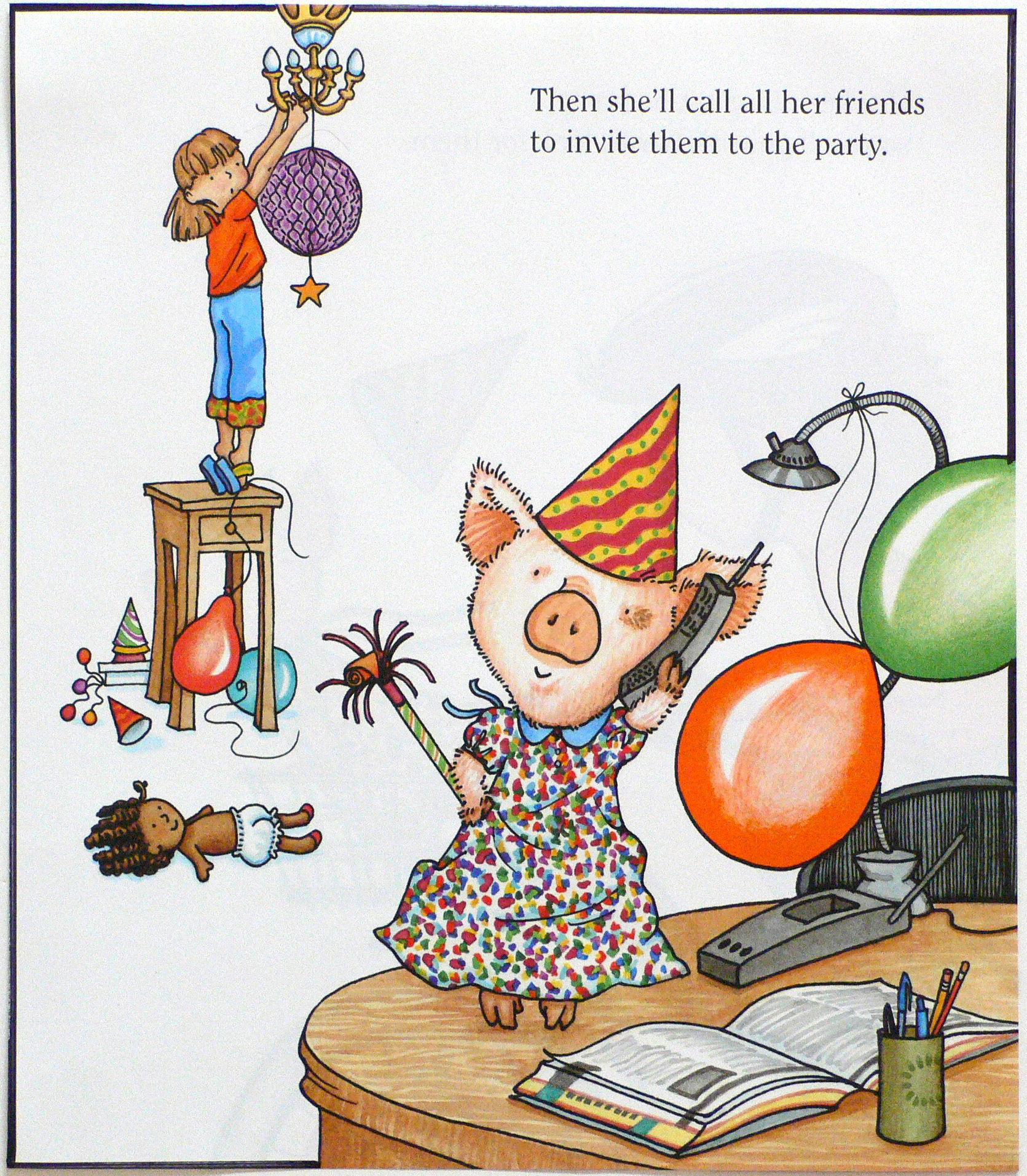
From If You Give a Pig a Party

All illustrated by Felicia Bond.

- If You Give a Mouse a Cookie (November 1985)
- If You Give a Moose a Muffin (March 1991)
- If You Give a Pig a Pancake (February 1998)
- The Best Mouse Cookie (July 1999)
- If You Take a Mouse to the Movies (May 2000)
- If You Take a Mouse to School (September 2002)
- If You Give a Pig a Party (April 2004)
- Merry Christmas, Mouse! (August 2007)
- Time for School, Mouse! (2008)
- If You Give a Cat a Cupcake (2008)
- Happy Valentine's Day, Mouse! (2009)
- Happy Easter, Mouse! (2010)
- If You Give a Dog a Donut (2011)
- It's Pumpkin Day, Mouse! (2012)
- Happy Birthday, Mouse! (2012)
- If You Give a Mouse a Brownie (2016)

=== The What People Do Best series ===
- What Mommies Do Best/What Daddies Do Best
- What Grandmas Do Best/What Grandpas Do Best
- What Aunts Do Best/What Uncles Do Best
- What Sisters Do Best/What Brothers Do Best

=== The Jellybeans series ===
Written by Nate Evans, illustrated by Lynn Munsinger

- The Jellybeans and the Big Dance (Mar 1, 2008)
- The Jellybeans and the Big Book Bonanza (Mar 1, 2010)
- The Jellybeans and the Big Camp Kickoff (Mar 1, 2011)
- The Jellybeans and the Big Art Adventure (Mar 1, 2012)
- The Jellybeans Love to Dance (Mar 12, 2013)
- The Jellybeans Love to Read (Mar 11, 2014)

=== Other titles ===
- If You Give a Man a Cookie
- Raising a Hero (with Sean Hanrahan)
- Beatrice Doesn't Want to
- Sometimes I Wonder If Poodles Like Noodles
- Monster Munchies
- The Chicken Sisters
- Laura Numeroff's Ten Step Guide to Living with Your Monster
- Dogs Don't Wear Sneakers
- Chimps Don't Wear Glasses
- Two For Stew
- Why a Disguise?
- When Sheep Sleep
- Emily's Bunch (with Alice Richter)
- Walter
- Amy for Short
- Does Grandma Have an Elmo Elephant Jungle Kit
- You Can't Put Braces on Spaces (with Alice Richter)
- Phoebe Dexter Has Harriet Peterson's Sniffles
- If You Give an Author a Pencil
- Sherman Crunchley (with Nate Evans)
- "Would I Trade My Parents"
