= Moshe Rynecki =

- Born: 1881; Międzyrzec Podlaski, Congress Poland
- Died: 1943 (age 61–62); Majdanek concentration camp, General Government
- Spouse: Perla Mittelsbach

Moshe Rynecki (Polish: Mojżesz Rynecki, Yiddish: משה רינצקי Mosheh Rynetski; 1881–1943) was a Polish-Jewish artist. He was born in Międzyrzec Podlaski, Poland to a religious family. He was one of five surviving children of the eighteen born to his parents. Thirteen died of assorted childhood illnesses.

== Life ==
Rynecki began drawing at an early age. According to family lore, he used to use chalk, or sometimes paint when he had some, to draw figures on the floor and walls of his home. According to a memoir written by his son, George, "Not once was he actually beaten for breaking the commandment, 'Thou shalt not create images.'" He once explained his drive to paint to his son. He told him, "God gave me talent and I truly don't believe in breaking that natural trend. I simply have to do it. If He wouldn't want me to paint, I wouldn't have that tremendous urge and desire to immortalize on paper or canvas what I see. I simply am a writer of sorts, instead of words, I leave my messages in pictures. I don't feel to trespass the Bible's saying about images."

Rynecki received little formal art education. Although he probably would have preferred to go straight to art school, he first had to complete his Jewish education at a yeshiva. He did this, and then went on to a Russian middle school, which was a prerequisite to acceptance at the Warsaw School of Fine Arts, which he attended for a brief period during the 1906-1907 school year.

At age 17, Rynecki met Perla Mittelsbach, the daughter of a Warsaw family of some means. They married, and, while Moshe continued his studies at the Warsaw Academy, Perla was left to oversee the household and to run a small store (that store was located on Krucza Street). The store, which sold writing materials, books, and paintings supplies for artists, provided the family with an income. At about the same time, the store opened, Perla gave birth to a daughter. About a year and a half later, she gave birth to a son, George.

After completing his formal education, Rynecki went on to paint that which he knew best; the community in which he lived. In paintings such as "The Chess Players" and "Woman Embroidering," he captured people doing everyday activities and in paintings such as "Simhat Torah," "Synagogue Interior," and "In the Study," his works capture places, events, and issues central to the Jewish community. While some of his works were shown in local galleries were met with good reviews, his son George claims, "he was not successful in selling any of his works."

Early in the Second World War Rynecki was forced into the Warsaw Ghetto. Although he had little access to painting materials in the Ghetto, he did continue to paint. Only three paintings from this period of his life survived the Holocaust: "In the Shelter," "Forced Labor," and "Refugees."

In early 1943, Moshe was deported to Majdanek concentration camp, where he was murdered.

== Sources ==
- Elizabeth Rynecki, Chasing Portraits: A Great-Granddaughter's Quest for Her Lost Art Legacy, Penguin Random House, 2016.
- George J. Rynecki, Surviving Hitler in Poland: One Jew's Story, Trafford Publishing, 2006.
- Moshe Rynecki, Elizabeth Rynecki, Jewish Life in Poland: The Art of Moshe Rynecki (1881-1943), Trafford Publishing, 2005.
- Moshe Rynecki, 1881-1943, Judah L. Magnes Museum, 1981.
