= If You Give a Mouse a Cookie =

1985 children's book by Laura Numeroff and Felicia Bond

- Author: Laura Joffe Numeroff
- Illustrator: Felicia Bond
- Language: English
- Series: If You Give...
- Genre: Children's literature
- Publisher: Harper & Row
- Publication date: 1985
- Publication place: United States
- Media type: Hardback

If You Give a Mouse a Cookie is an American children's picture book written by Laura Joffe Numeroff and illustrated by Felicia Bond, first published in 1985 by Harper & Row. Described as a "circular tale", illustrating a slippery slope, it is Numeroff and Bond's first collaboration in what came to be the If You Give... series.

== Plot ==
The entire story is told in second person. A boy gives a cookie to a mouse. The mouse then asks for a glass of milk. He goes on to request a straw to drink the milk, a napkin, a mirror to avoid a milk mustache, nail scissors to trim his hair using the mirror, and a broom, to sweep up his hair trimmings.

Next, he has the boy give him a blanket to take a nap, read him a story, give him crayons and paper so he can draw a picture, and then hang the picture on the refrigerator. Looking at the refrigerator makes him thirsty, so the mouse asks for a second glass of milk. The circle is complete when he wants a cookie to go with it.

== Art ==
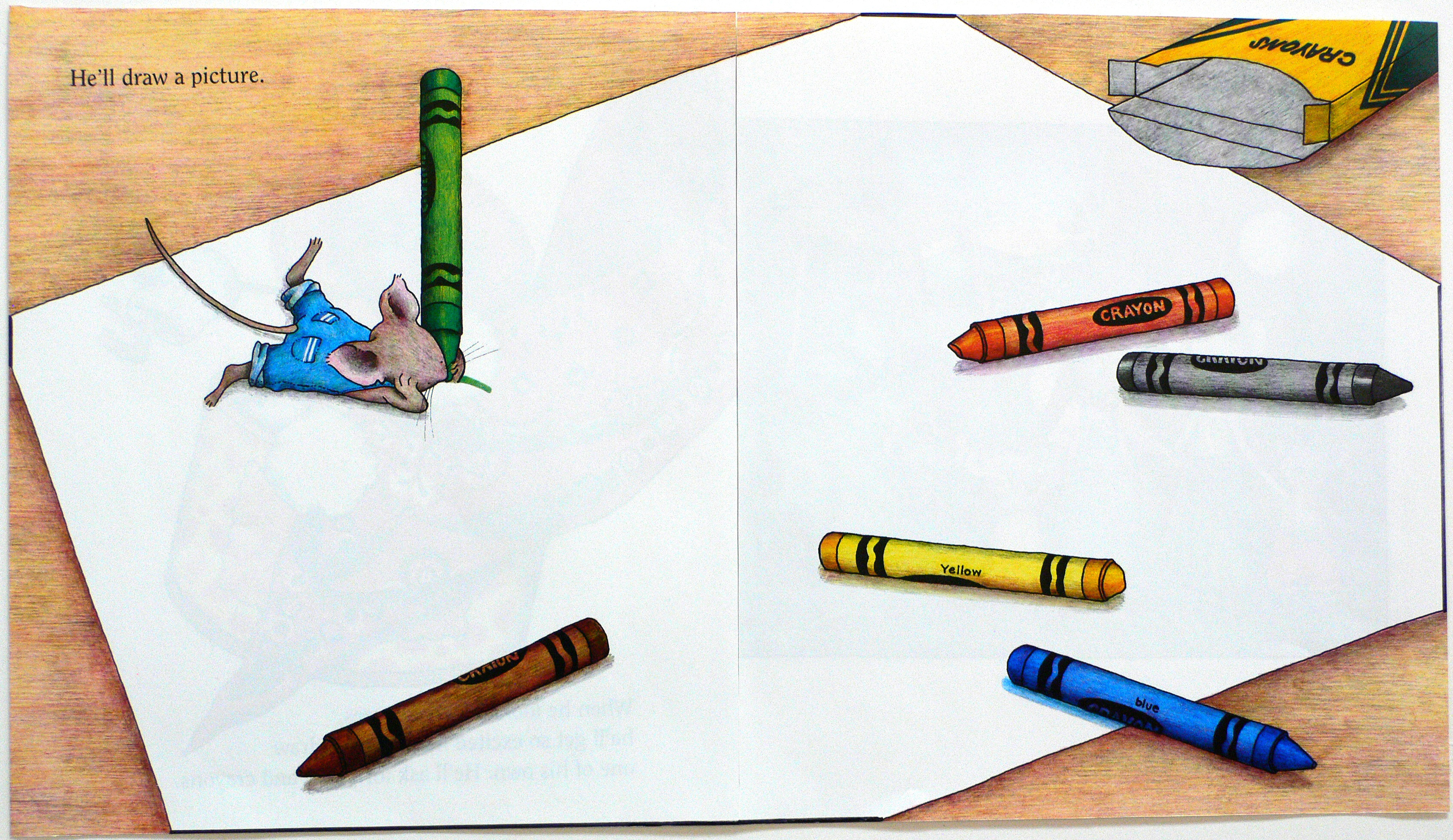
From If You Give a Mouse a Cookie

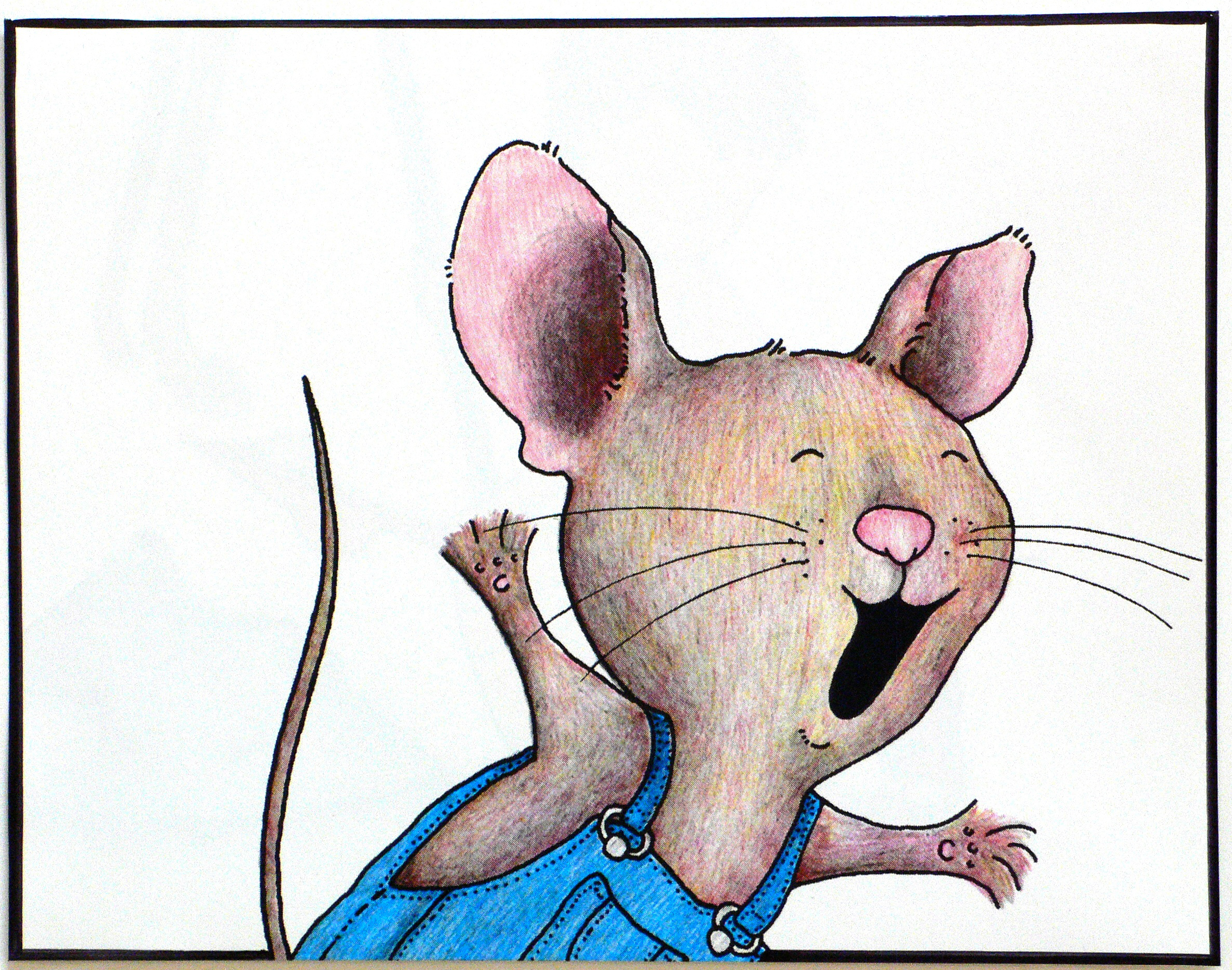
From If You Give a Mouse a Cookie

The text was interpreted by illustrator Felicia Bond to show the increasing energy of the mouse, with the little boy being run ragged by the end of the story. The art was praised by School Library Journal for its "meticulous attention to detail", and was executed with blended pencils in a process of layering magenta, cyan, yellow, and black on separate sheets, which were then assembled during printing.

== Awards & recognition ==
If You Give a Mouse a Cookie won a number of awards following its release, including the Alabama Camellia Children's Choice Book Award (1986–87), Georgia Children's Book Award (1988), Buckeye Children's Book Award (1989), Nevada Young Readers' Award (1989), California Young Reader Medal (1988), Colorado Children's Book Award (1988).

It was a nominee for the Nebraska Golden Sower Award in 1987, the Washington Children's Choice Picture Book Award and Kentucky Bluegrass Award in 1988, and the Grand Canyon Reader Award in 1989.

In 2006, Numeroff won the Milner Award for her work on If You Give a Mouse a Cookie. The book was inducted into the Picture Book Hall of Fame in 2015.

== In popular culture ==
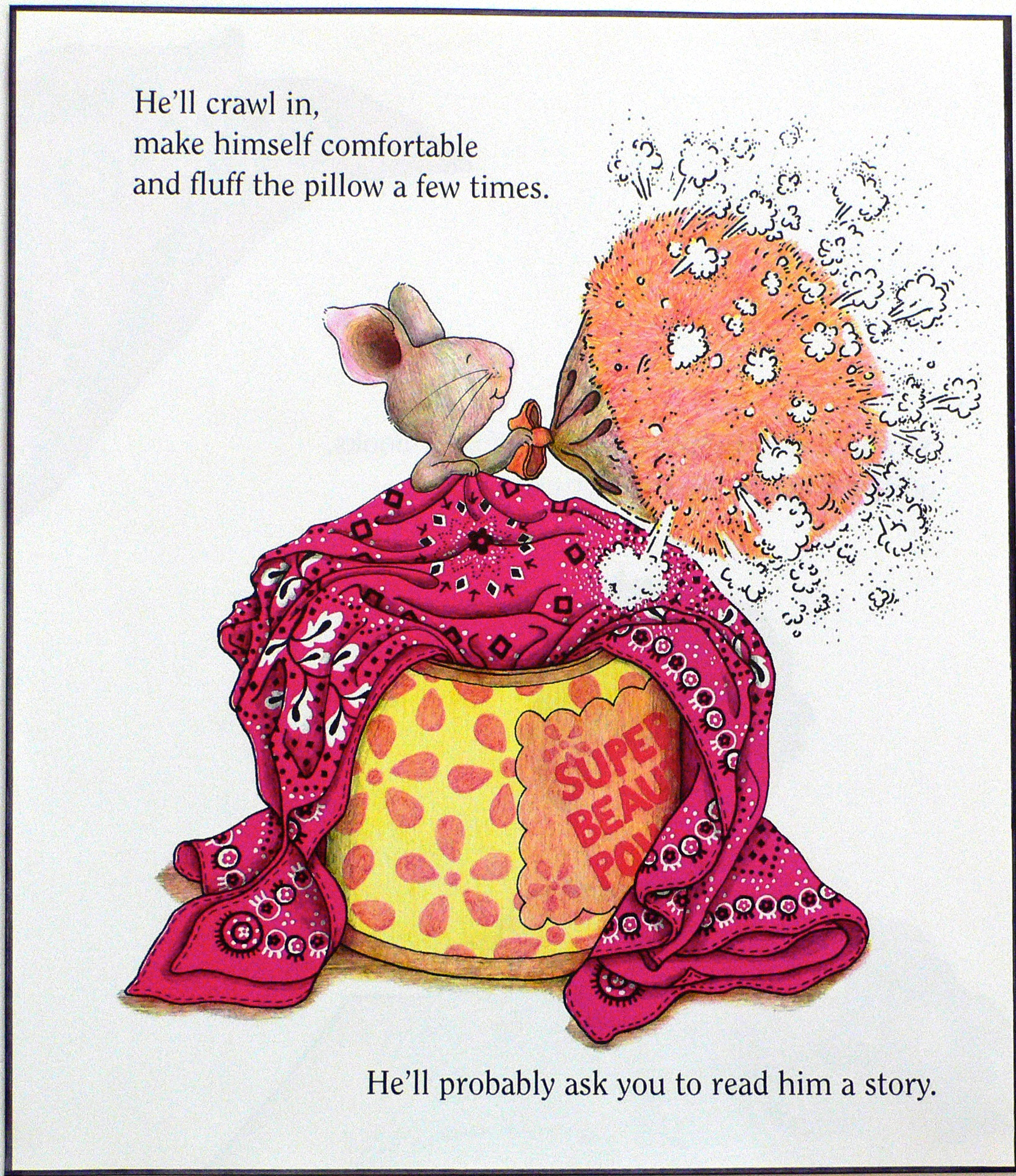
From If You Give a Mouse a Cookie

If You Give a Mouse a Cookie quickly became established as a popular favorite and is today considered a contemporary classic. In 1993, the book was featured on Reading Rainbow.

Charles Schulz created two Peanuts strips about If You Give a Mouse a Cookie. In 2000, Oprah Winfrey chose If You Give a Pig a Pancake as one of her favorite things. She also included it on her list Oprah's Favorite Things from A-Z in that same year.

The Bronx Zoo featured the art in its Children's Zoo for one year. The series has fans of all ages from all over the world including Japan, where an entire Tokyo city bus was painted with images of Mouse.

In Laura Bush's Celebration of American Authors at the 2001 Presidential Inauguration, Felicia Bond and Laura Numeroff were among those honored for their If You Give... series. The Bush family writes that their cat India's favorite book was If You Take a Mouse to the Movies. A bronze sculpture of her sleeping on the book is included in the George W. Bush Presidential Library. First Lady Michelle Obama read If You Give a Mouse a Cookie on the White House lawn during the 2009 Easter Egg Roll.

The book itself was featured in an episode of Kino's Storytime, and appeared as part of a "Mail Time" segment on the Blue's Clues episode "Blue's ABCs". It was also featured on the Blue's Room episode "Snacktime Playdate".

In the movie Air Force One, a captured President warns the Vice-President via phone about negotiating with the terrorists holding him hostage by saying, "If you give a mouse a cookie..." She responds with a knowing look, "...they're going to want a glass of milk."

In the September 18, 2025 episode of The Late Show with Stephen Colbert Colbert's monologue segment uses the book's cover in political satire, altered to depict Jimmy Kimmel as the cookie, in reference to ABC's indefinite suspension of Jimmy Kimmel Live! under perceived political pressure from the Trump administration, following CBS' cancellation two months earlier of The Late Show.

== Selected translations ==
- Souris, tu veux un biscuit? (1986, French, ISBN 0-590-71710-3)
- Kekse für die Maus im Haus (1987, German, ISBN 978-3-551-08240-4)
- 如果你給老鼠吃餅乾 (1993, Chinese (Traditional), ISBN 957-632-197-2)
- Si le das una galletita a un ratón (1995, Spanish, ISBN 0-06-025438-6)
- אם תיתן עוגייה לעכבר (1997, Hebrew, ISBN 965-286-420-X)
- Se dai un biscotto a un topo (1997, Italian, ISBN 88-384-8007-9)
- もしもねずみにクッキーをあげると (1999, Japanese, ISBN 4-265-06641-0)
- 要是你给老鼠吃饼干 (2005, Chinese (Simplified), ISBN 7-5324-6639-6)
- Если дать мышонку печенье (2012, Russian, ISBN 978-5-903497-87-4. However, it was published at least as early as 1991 in the children's magazine Трамвай (The Tram))

== Adaptations ==
An animated series adaptation of the same name was released on Amazon Prime. It debuted as part of Amazon's 2015 Pilot Season. A If You Give a Mouse a Christmas Cookie holiday special was released on November 25, 2016. The show's first season was released on November 7, 2017, with Numeroff and Bond serving as executive producers. Singer-songwriter Lisa Loeb provided original music for the show.

The books have also been adapted into plays for children's theaters.

== If You Give... series ==
Following the success of If You Give a Mouse a Cookie, Numeroff and Bond have worked together on several other books that now make up the If You Give... series:

- If You Give a Moose a Muffin (1991)
- If You Give a Pig a Pancake (1998)
- The Best Mouse Cookie (1999)
- If You Take a Mouse to the Movies (2000)
- If You Take a Mouse to School (2002)
- If You Give a Pig a Party (2005)
- Mouse Cookies & More: A Treasury (2006)
- Merry Christmas, Mouse! (2007)
- Time for School, Mouse! (2008)
- If You Give a Cat a Cupcake (2008)
- Happy Valentine's Day, Mouse! (2009)
- Happy Easter, Mouse! (2010)
- If You Give a Dog a Donut (2011)
- Happy Birthday, Mouse! (2012)
- It's Pumpkin Day, Mouse! (2012)
- If You Give a Mouse a Brownie (2016)
