= Felicia Bond =

American writer and illustrator (born 1954)

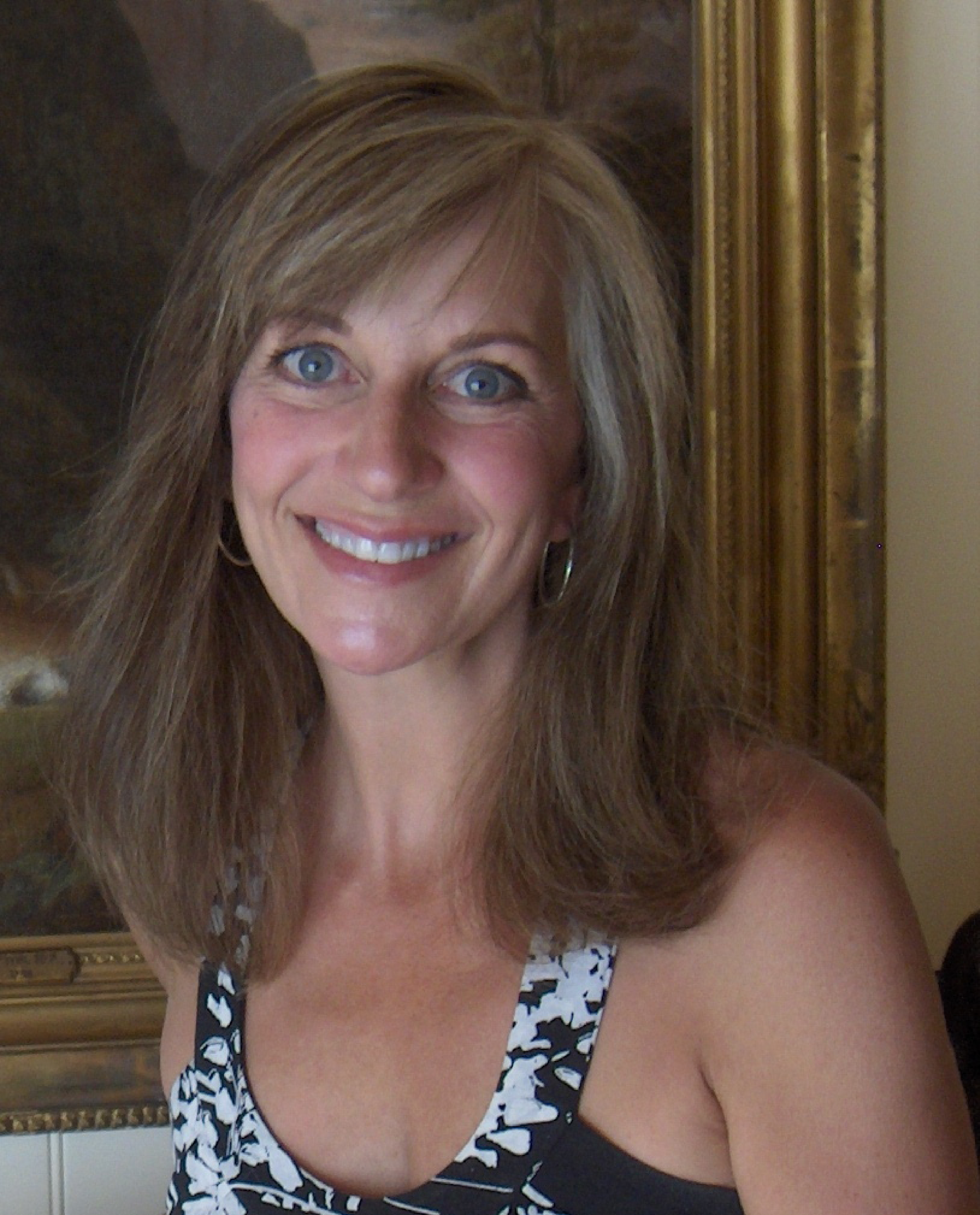
- Born: July 18, 1954 (age 72); Yokohama, Japan
- Occupations: Illustrator, writer
- Writing career
- Genre: Children's illustrated books
- Notable works: If You Give a Mouse a Cookie; Illustrator; Poinsettia and Her Family; Writer, illustrator Big Red Barn; Illustrator

Felicia Bond (born July 18, 1954 in Yokohama, Japan) is an American writer and illustrator of numerous books for children. She is the illustrator of all the If You Give... series written by Laura Numeroff and published by HarperCollins Children's Books.

== Early life ==
Bond was born to American parents in Yokohama, Japan, where she lived for two years. She grew up in Bronxville, New York and Houston, Texas with her four brothers and two sisters. At age five she observed a beam of light coming in her bedroom window and knew that art was her calling.

She cites numerous inspirations as a child, among them the covers of The New Yorker, the drawings in her Girl Scout Handbook, the sketches her mother drew for her and her siblings, and the art in children's books. She was especially drawn to the painterly, expressive style of Ludwig Bemelmans in his Madeline books, and the sensitive ink drawings by Garth Williams in Charlotte's Web and Stuart Little. For many years she closely examined the work of Charles Schulz, renowned for his Peanuts comic strip, and credits him as making a lasting impression on her.

== Education ==
Bond took a B.F.A. in painting from The University of Texas, Austin, with continuing studies at The School of Visual Arts, New York City.

== Career ==
At age twenty-two Bond moved to New York City with nine hundred dollars and worked several jobs, including illustrating botanical books, working as a freelance scene painter in a children's museum, and as an art director for Margaret K. McElderry Books. During this time she took classes at The School of Visual Arts and put together a portfolio of work intended for children's books. She was offered five contracts in short order and left behind her original idea of pursuing her painting.

At age twenty-six, the first book she both wrote and illustrated, Poinsettia and Her Family, was published. Four more books of her own quickly followed before she illustrated If You Give a Mouse a Cookie in 1985. Bond has also illustrated, among other works, Big Red Barn, written by Margaret Wise Brown, The Big Green Pocketbook, written by Candice Ransom, Little Porcupine's Christmas, written by Joseph Slate and The Right Number of Elephants, written by Jeff Sheppard.

She is both author and illustrator of numerous other works, including Poinsettia and her Family, Poinsettia and the Firefighters, The Day It Rained Hearts, The Halloween Play, Tumble Bumble, and Big Hugs, Little Hugs.

If You Give a Mouse a Cookie, the first collaborative work written by Laura Numeroff and illustrated by Felicia Bond, quickly became established as a popular favorite and is today considered a contemporary classic. A series of seventeen titles followed, with sales exceeding fifty million. They have been translated into more than thirteen languages. The If You Give... series has garnered numerous awards, and their popularity is witnessed by their consistent presence on The New York Times Best Seller List.

Many of the books were the #1 best-sellers in the picture book category. The If You Give... books have become so embedded in our culture that If You Give a Mouse a Cookie was mentioned in the movie Airforce One, on the television show The L Word and in Mad Magazine. Charles Schulz created two Peanuts strips about If You Give a Mouse a Cookie, and Oprah Winfrey chose If You Give a Pig a Pancake as one of her favorite things in 2000. Oprah included it on her list Oprah’s Favorite Things from A-Z in 2000.

If You Give a Moose a Muffin was the answer to a question on Jeopardy!. The books have been adapted into plays for children's theaters across the country, The Bronx Zoo in New York featured the art in their Children's Zoo for one year and the artwork has been used to create murals in the wings of children's hospitals. The series has fans of all ages from all over the world including Japan, where an entire Tokyo city bus was painted with images of Mouse.

Mouse also made it to the White House; in Laura Bush's Celebration of American Authors at the 2001 Presidential Inauguration Felicia Bond and Laura Numeroff were among those honored for their If You Give... series, and the former First Lady writes that the Bush family cat India's favorite book was If You Take a Mouse to the Movies. A bronze sculpture of her sleeping on the book is included in the George W. Bush Presidential Library. First Lady Michelle Obama read If You Give a Mouse a Cookie on the White House lawn during the 2009 Easter Egg Roll.

The website mousecookiebooks.com, posted by its publisher, HarperCollins, is an interactive site for children, parents, teachers, and librarians alike.

== Style, content and process ==
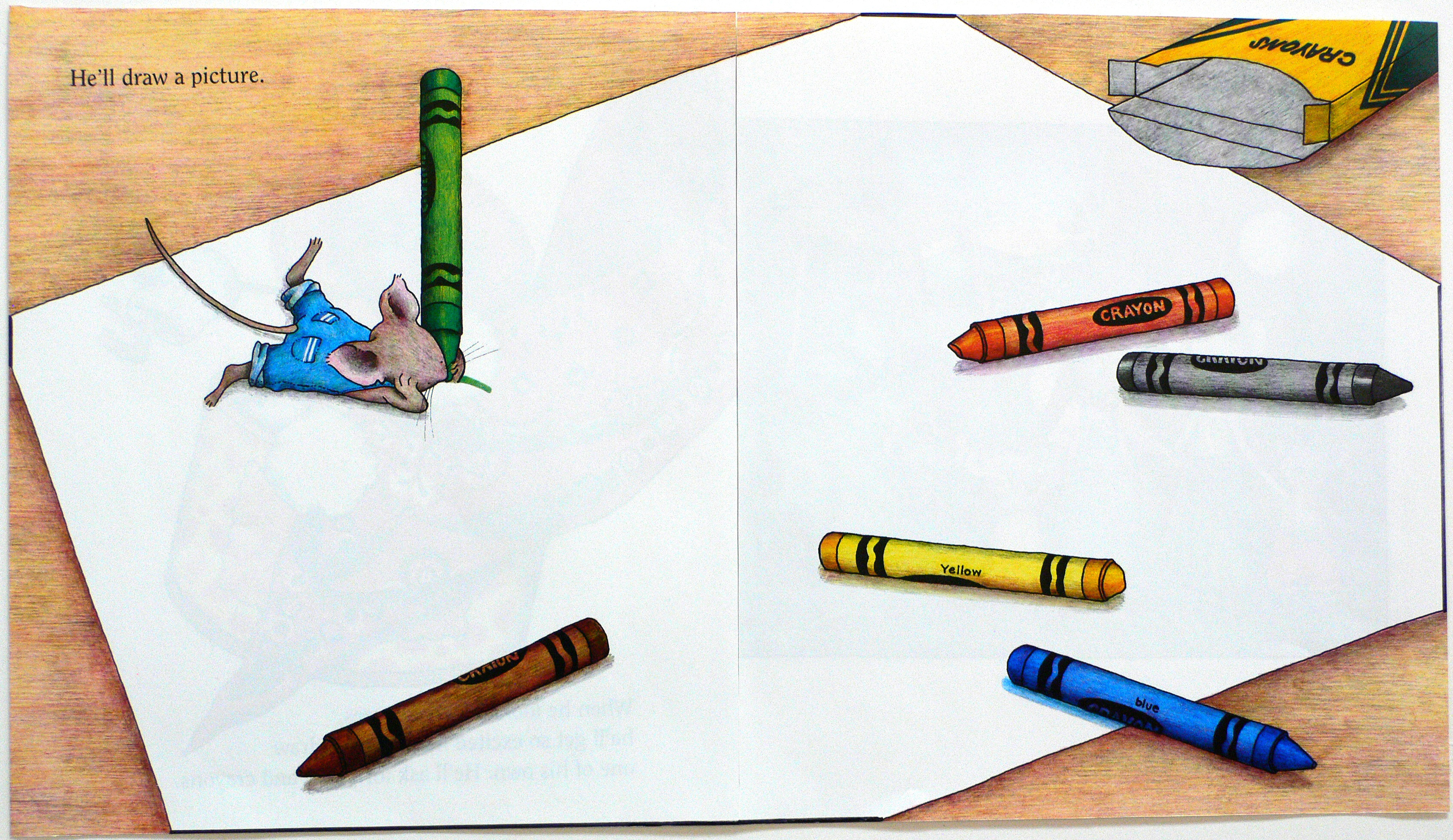
From If You Give a Mouse a Cookie

In her illustrations Bond's signature style is characterized by rich, vibrant watercolor, often with a black line used for graphic effect. Her use of white space is often similarly applied, especially in her distinctive design of the books in the If You Give... series. Her book Big Hugs, Little Hugs uses mixed media collage, which reflects her painting style from her early twenties.

She personalizes many of her illustrations by discreetly writing the names of family, friends, and pets in the art. She has said she started doing this years ago, inspired by the cross-hatched ink artwork in The New York Times by Al Hirschfeld, who hid his daughter's name, Nina, at least once in almost every drawing.

Bond's writing style varies in content but is often narrative and character based. Poinsettia and Her Family and Poinsettia and the Firefighters came about from her own childhood. Other stories began as an aimless doodle, such as the whimsical The Day It Rained Hearts and the playful Tumble Bumble. Her book Big Hugs, Little Hugs is more conceptual in nature and evolved from a dream that she merged with a comforting story her father told her when she was a child and couldn't fall asleep. In interviews she has said her ideas come from an "impulsive and intuitive place", that she "lives a story" instead of tells it. She works to keep the "mysterious third thing" alive in a book while she hones the narrative arc and pacing of the words and design. She often compares the making of a book to cooking, a musical score, or a dance.

== Books ==
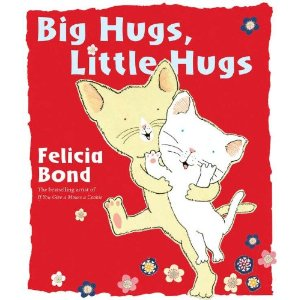
Big Hugs, Little Hugs written and illustrated by Felicia Bond

=== Written and illustrated ===
- Poinsettia and Her Family (T.Y.Crowell/HarperCollins, 1981)
- Mary Betty Lizzie McNutt's Birthday (T.Y. Crowell, 1983)
- The Day It Rained Hearts (T.Y. Crowell/HarperCollins, 1983)
- The Halloween Play (T.Y. Crowell/HarperCollins, 1983)
- The Chicks' Christmas (T.Y. Crowell, 1983)
- Poinsettia and the Firefighters (T.Y. Crowell/HarperCollins, 1984)
- Wake Up, Vladimir (T.Y. Crowell, 1987)
- Tumble Bumble (Front Street Books, 1996)
- Big Hugs, Little Hugs (Philomel Books, 2012)

=== Illustrated (selected) ===
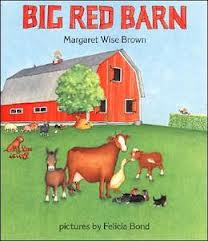
Big Red Barn, illustrated by Felicia Bond and written by Margaret Wise Brown

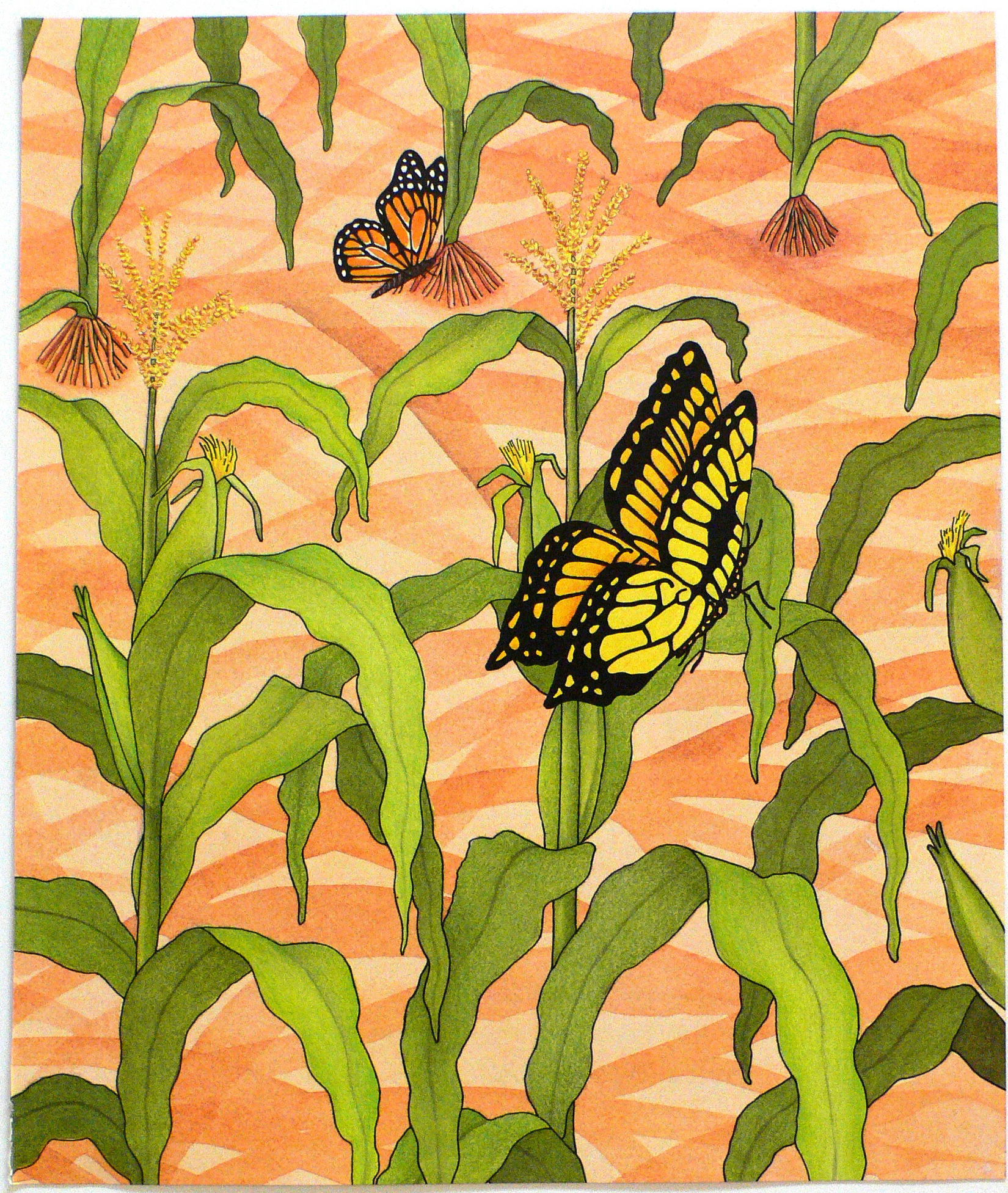
Interior illustration from Big Red Barn

- Little Porcupine's Christmas, written by Joseph Slate (T.Y. Crowell/HarperCollins, 1992)
- The Big Green Pocketbook, written by Candice Ransom (HarperCollins, 1993)
- Big Red Barn, written by Margaret Wise Brown (HarperCollins, 1989)
- The Right Number of Elephants, written by Jeff Sheppard (HarperCollins, 1990)

=== Illustrator, If You Give... (series) ===
written by Laura Numeroff; HarperCollins Children's Books, 1985 onward

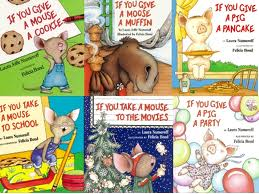
If You Give... book jacket medley, illustrated by Felicia Bond

- If You Give a Mouse a Cookie (1985)
- If You Give a Moose a Muffin (1991)
- If You Give a Pig a Pancake (1998)
- The Best Mouse Cookie (1999)
- If You Take a Mouse to the Movies (2000)
- If You Take a Mouse to School (2002)
- If You Give a Pig a Party (2005)
- Merry Christmas, Mouse! (2007)
- Time for School, Mouse! (2008)
- If You Give a Cat a Cupcake (2008)
- Happy Valentine's Day, Mouse! (2009)
- Happy Easter, Mouse! (2010)
- If You Give a Dog a Donut (2011)
- It's Pumpkin Day, Mouse! (2012)
- Happy Birthday, Mouse! (2012)
- If You Give a Mouse a Brownie (2016)

=== Compilation Editions If You Give... Series ===
- Mouse Cookies and More (2007)
- If You Take a Mouse to the Movies, A Special Christmas Edition (2010)

== Awards and recognitions ==
=== If You Give... Series ===
- Honoree, Laura Bush Celebrates American Authors, 2001 Presidential Inauguration

=== If You Give A Mouse A Cookie ===
- Alabama Children's Choice Book Award, K–1 (1986–87)
- California Young Reader Medal (1988)
- Colorado Children's’ Book Award (1988)
- Georgia Children's Picture Story Book Award (1988)
- Nevada Young Readers’ Award (1988–89)
- Buckeye Children's Book Award, K–2 (Ohio) (1989)
- Oppenheim Toy Portfolio Platinum Award (1994)
- Oppenheim Toy Portfolio Gold Award (1994)
- Oppenheim Toy Portfolio Blue Chip Classic Award (1994)
- NEA Teacher's Picks Books to Read Across America (1999)

If You Give A Moose A Muffin

- Children's Choices (IRA/CBC) (1992)
- Oppenheim Toy Portfolio Platinum Award (1998)
- Oppenheim Toy Portfolio Gold Award (1998)

If You Give A Pig A Pancake

- Oppenheim Platinum Award (1999)
- IRA Children's Choice (1999)
- Oprah Winfrey named If You Give a Pig a Pancake her “favorite book for children”
- Listed on Oprah Winfrey's “Oprah’s Favorite Things from A-Z”

If You Take A Mouse To The Movies

- NAPPA Gold Award (2000)
- Oppenheim Toy Portfolio Platinum Award (2001)
- IRA/CBC Children's Choice (2001)

If You Take A Mouse To School

- Oppenheim Toy Portfolio Gold Award (2003)

If You Give A Pig A Party

- Quill Award (2006)
