= Quits (song) =

Single by Bill Anderson

from the album Bill Anderson's Greatest Hits, Vol. 2
- B-side: "I'll Live for You"
- Released: July 1971
- Recorded: January 14, 1971
- Studio: Bradley Studio
- Genre: Country; Nashville Sound
- Length: 2:24
- Label: Decca
- Songwriter: Bill Anderson
- Producer: Owen Bradley

Bill Anderson singles chronology
"Always Remember" (1971)	"Quits" (1971)	"Dis-Satisfied" (1971)

"Quits" is a song written and recorded by American country singer-songwriter Bill Anderson. It was released as a single in 1971 via Decca Records and became a major hit the same year.

== Background and release ==
"Quits" was recorded on January 14, 1971 at the Bradley Studio, located in Nashville, Tennessee. The sessions were produced by Owen Bradley, who would serve as Anderson's producer through most of years with Decca Records. Two additional tracks were recorded at the same session: "I'm Alright" and "Country Classics."

"Quits" was released as a single by Decca Records in July 1971. The song spent 17 weeks on the Billboard Hot Country Singles before reaching number six in September 1971. In Canada, the single reached number two on the RPM Country Songs chart. It was the only single spawned from his 1971 compilation Bill Anderson's Greatest Hits, Vol. 2.

== Track listings ==
7" vinyl single

- "Quits" – 2:24
- "I'll Live for You" – 2:25

== Chart performance ==
Chart (1971)	Peak position
Canada Country Songs (RPM)	2
US Hot Country Songs (Billboard)	3
