= Sándor Szűcs =

Hungarian footballer

Personal information
- Date of birth: 23 November 1921
- Place of birth: Szolnok, Kingdom of Hungary
- Date of death: 4 June 1951 (aged 29)
- Place of death: Budapest, Hungary PR
- Position: Defender

Senior career*
Years	Team	Apps	(Gls)
1939–1944	Szolnoki MÁV		
1944–1951	Újpest FC		

International career
1941–1948	Hungary	19	(0)
- * Club domestic league appearances and goals

Sándor Szűcs (23 November 1921 – 4 June 1951) was a Hungarian football player. He was a defender for Szolnoki MÁV and Újpest FC, with whom he was a three-time league champion in the Nemzeti Bajnokság I. He had 19 appearances for Hungary from 1941 to 1948. In 1951, he was executed for an attempted defection to Austria.

== Biography ==
Szűcs was born in Szolnok in 1921. He began his career with his local club, Szolnoki MÁV, at the age of 17. In 1944, he moved to Újpest FC where he played alongside Ferenc Szusza and Gyula Zsengellér.

In 1940, he made his first appearance for the Hungarian national youth team. In March 1941, he was called up to the Hungary national football team for a match against Yugoslavia. While in the national team, he played alongside Ferenc Puskás, József Bozsik, Ferenc Deák, György Sárosi and Nándor Hidegkuti.

=== Arrest ===
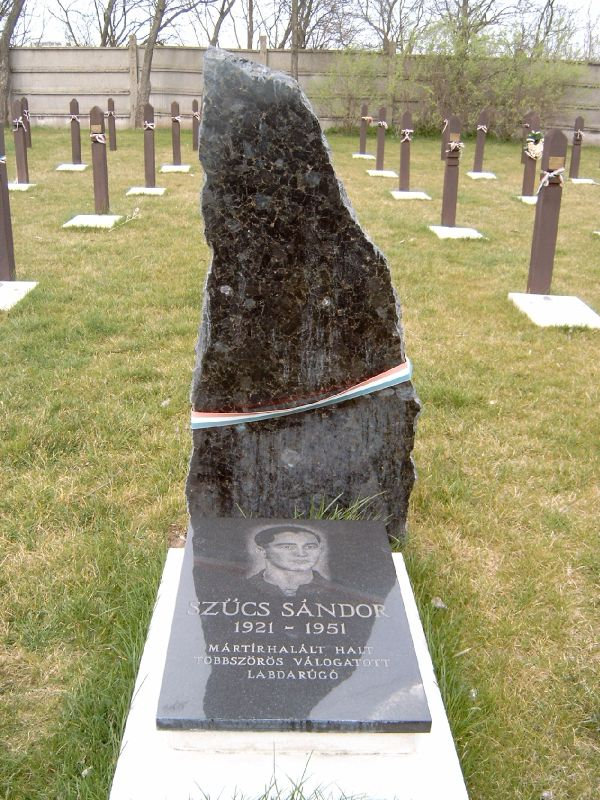
The grave of Sándor Szűcs in the New Public Cemetery, Budapest

In 1948, Szűcs met singer Erzsi Kovács and they began an affair. Kovács was married to pianist Lajos Boros and the state frowned upon the adulterous relationship, especially after Kovács moved in with Szűcs. He was not called up to the national team and told that he risked losing his football career. Szűcs had received word of an offer from A.C. Milan through a contact and the pair considered escaping from Hungary.

In 1949, fellow Hungarian player László Kubala defected to the west and formed a team called Hungaria made up of Eastern European émigrés, including Hungarians. The team played friendlies against major western clubs, which paid them well. Efforts to recruit eastern bloc players by those that had already escaped resulted in the authorities in those countries stepping up their watch on their players.

The couple found someone who would help them reach the west in exchange for a half pound of gold plus US$5,000, if successful. On 6 March 1951, they left with their handler. Near Szombathely, they were stopped by a patrol, but made it through by showing their identification. Some distance later, the smuggler asked Szűcs to give him his gun. A few minutes later, soldiers from the ÁVO placed Szűcs and Kovács in custody. It turned out that the smuggler was an ÁVO agent and that the entire escape had been a trap.

Once arrested, an added complication for Szűcs was that he played for Ujpest, now named Budapesti Dózsa, which was controlled by the police. As a player for the team, he was a commissioned lieutenant in the police and was carrying his service weapon during the attempt. This made him subject to an anti-defection law that called for life imprisonment or the death penalty for members of any armed service caught defecting. He and Kovács were held for months before their trial. Szűcs was found guilty and sentenced to death by hanging. His former teammates Ferenc Puskás and József Bozsik attempted to intervene on his behalf without success. On 4 June 1951, Szűcs was executed.

=== Aftermath ===
The trial was held in secret and, officially, nobody knew about the execution until the political changes in the country in 1989. Additionally, the location of his grave was strictly confidential. After the communist regime's fall, Szűcs' story was widely published. In 1989 the death sentence was revoked and declared a violation of the law. In 1991, he was posthumously named a police lieutenant-colonel. Since 1993, an elementary school was named after him in Újpest, while a football tournament for youth players of the district is held every year. The stand of Újpest FC's Ferenc Szusza Stadium where home team supporters sit has been named after him. A documentary movie was filmed of his story in 2005.
