= Kazimierz Kierzkowski =

Polish activist (1890–1942)

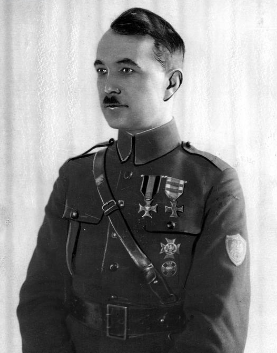

Kazimierz Kierzkowski (10 August 1890 in Międzyrzec Podlaski – 21 March 1942 in Auschwitz) was a Polish political and social activist, major of the Polish Army and member of the Armia Krajowa. During the Second World War he was held at the German concentration camp Auschwitz from 10 February 1942 and was killed there on 21 March. His date of birth has also been given as 10 July 1891.
