= Sława Przybylska =

Polish singer

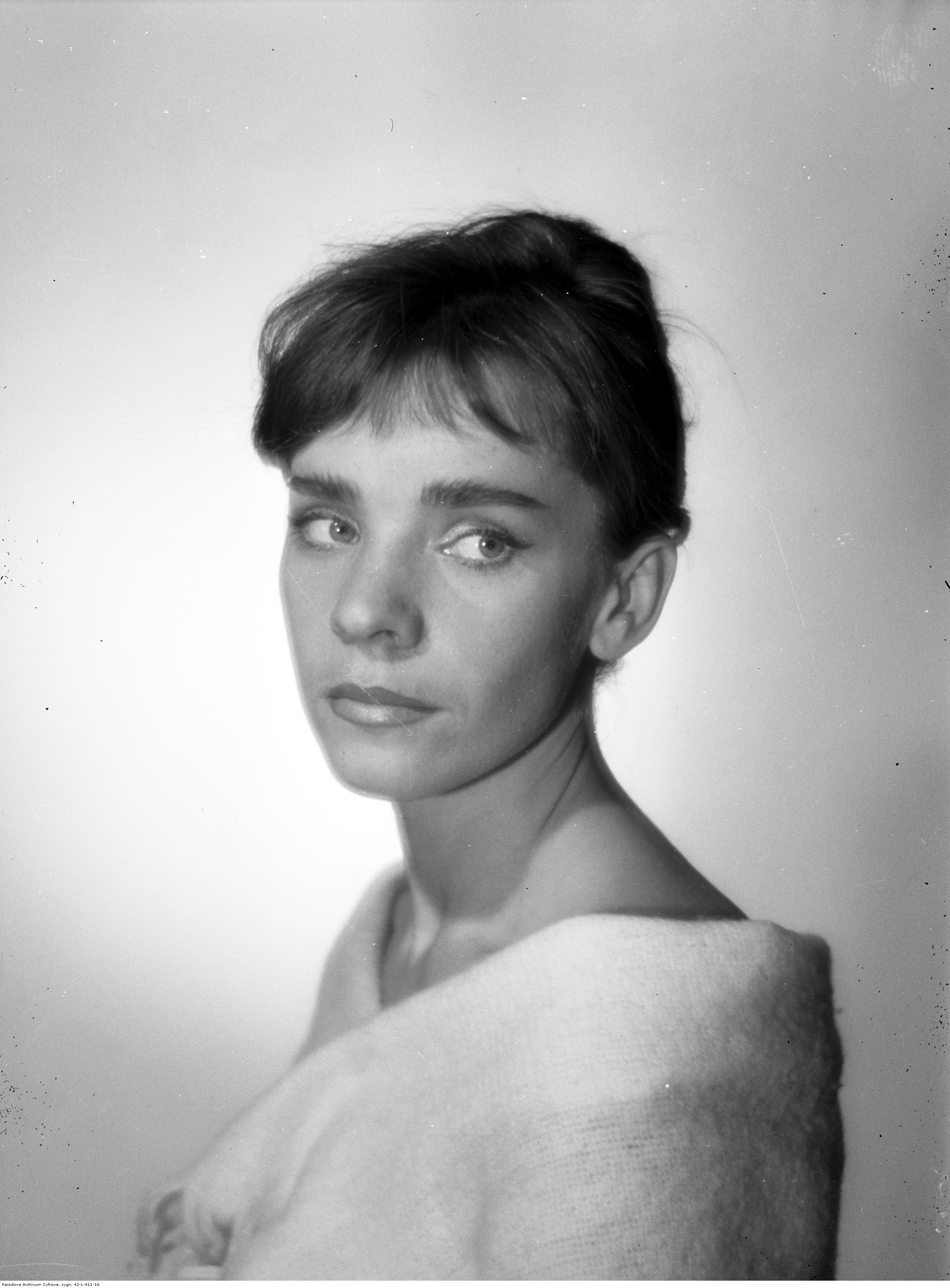
- Born: Stanisława Przybylska; 2 November 1931 (age 94); Międzyrzec Podlaski, Poland
- Occupation: Singer
- Years active: 1956–present

Sława Przybylska-Krzyżanowska (born 2 November 1931) is a Polish singer who became popular in 1957 with the song Pamiętasz była jesień ("Do you remember, it was autumn...") Before her musical career, she graduated from art school and then studied foreign trade at the Central School of Foreign Service.

== Selected songs ==
- Gdzie są kwiaty z tamtych lat?
- Krakowska kwiaciarka
- Pamiętasz była jesień
- Piosenka o okularnikach
- Słodkie fiołki
- Widzisz mała
- Tango bolero
- Ciao, ciao bambina
- Gorąca noc
- Tango notturno
- Patrzę na twoją fotografię
- Pensylwania!!!
- Na Francuskiej
- Przyjdzie dzień
- Już nigdy!
- 1993: Ałef-Bejs, Pieśni i piosenki żydowskie (Alef-Beys, Jewish Songs), album

=== Songs of Bulat Okudzhava ===
- Ach panie panowie
- Czarny kot
- Droga na Smoleńsk
- François Villon
- Krople króla duńskiego
- Ostatni trolejbus
- Piosenka o piechocie
- Trzy miłości

== Awards and decorations ==
- 1974: Gold Cross of Merit
- 1979: Meritorious Activist of Culture
- 1982: Knight's Cross of the Order of Polonia Restituta
- 2000: Officer's Cross of the Order of Polonia Restituta
- 2011: Gold Gloria Artis Medal for Merit to Culture
