= Międzyrzec Podlaski =

Town in Lublin Voivodeship, Poland

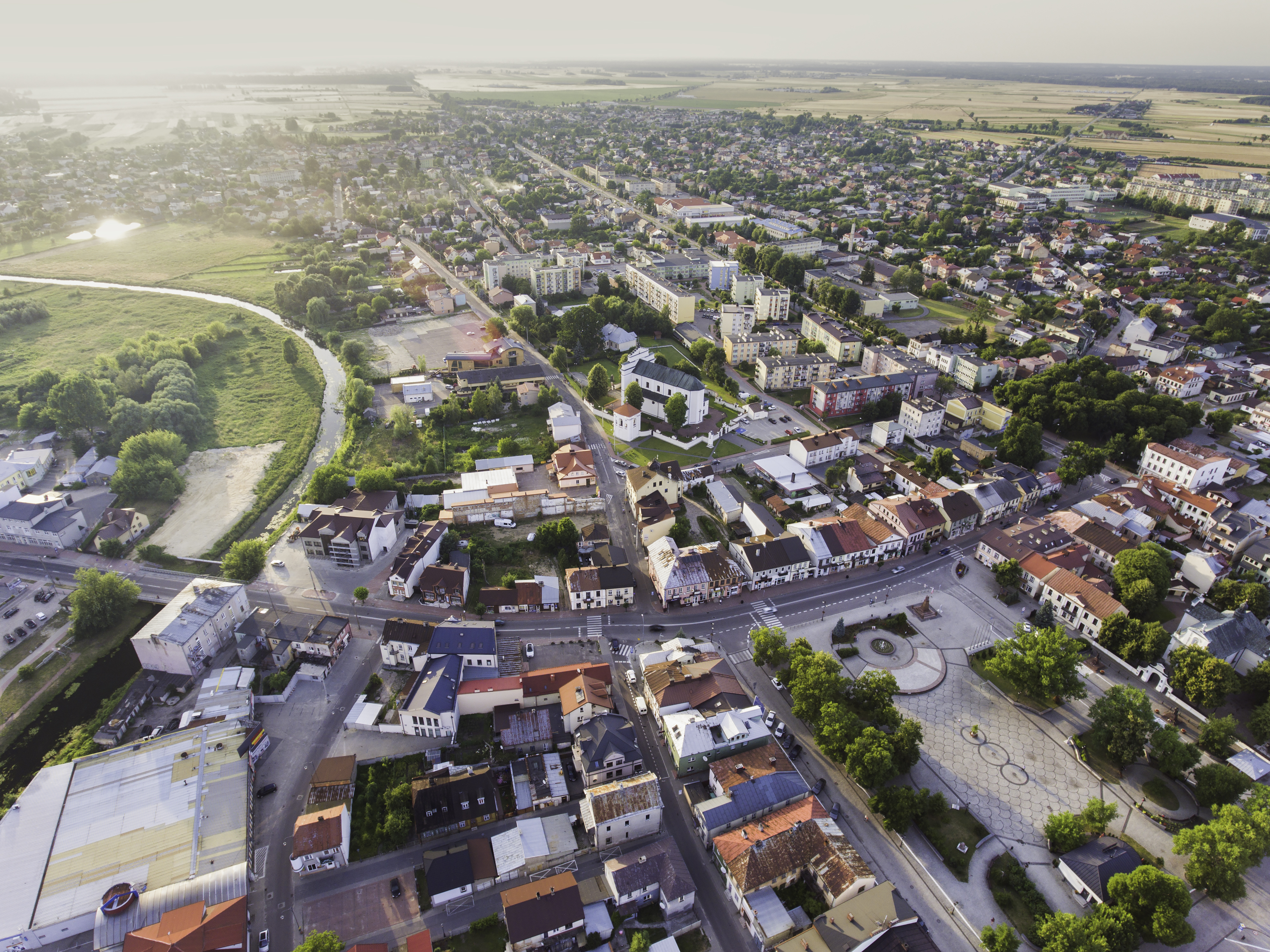
- Aerial view of Międzyrzec Podlaski

- Flag Coat of arms

- Location within Poland
- Coordinates: 51°59′0″N 22°47′0″E
- Country: Poland
- Voivodeship: Lublin
- County: Biała
- Gmina: Międzyrzec Podlaski (urban gmina)
- Established: 12th century
- Town rights: 15th century

Government
  - Mayor: Janina Króliczak

Area
  - Total: 20.03 km^{2} (7.73 sq mi)
- Elevation: 148 m (486 ft)

Population (2014)
  - Total: 17,102
  - Density: 853.8/km^{2} (2,211/sq mi)
- Time zone: UTC+1 (CET)
  - Summer (DST): UTC+2 (CEST)
- Postal code: 21–560
- Area code: +48 83
- Car plates: LBI
- Website: http://www.miedzyrzec.pl

Międzyrzec Podlaski (Polish pronunciation: [mʲɛnˈd͡zɨʐɛt͡s pɔdˈlaskʲi]; Latin: Meserici) is a town in Biała County, Lublin Voivodeship, Poland, with a population of 17,102 inhabitants as of 2014. The total area of the town is 20.03 square kilometres (7.73 sq mi). Międzyrzec is located in the historic region of Podlachia, near the Krzna river, not far from the border with Belarus.

== History ==
Potocki Palace and Park

Ancient Roman coins – denarii of emperors Hadrian and Antoninus Pius – have been found within the town limits.

The first official mention of Międzyrzec Podlaski as a town dates back to 1434, or (alternatively) 1455 and 1477 according to different historical sources. At that time, the newly established town was located along a busy merchant route from Łuków to Brześć. Międzyrzec quickly developed: in 1486, a Roman Catholic church was built here, and town's owner, Jan Nassutowicz, received permission for fairs. In 1598, a salt warehouse was opened, the town also was center of beer industry. Międzyrzec was a private town of the Nassutowicz, Wyszyński, Zabrzeziński, Zbaraski and Czartoryski noble families.

The period of peace and prosperity ended in 1648, when Miedzyrzec was raided by Zaporozhian Cossacks. During the Swedish invasion of Poland, the town was ransacked and burned by Swedes, who returned in 1706 and 1708, during the Great Northern War. Furthermore, Międzyrzec was raided by Russians in 1660. In 1775, Międzyrzec was the largest city in Podlachia.

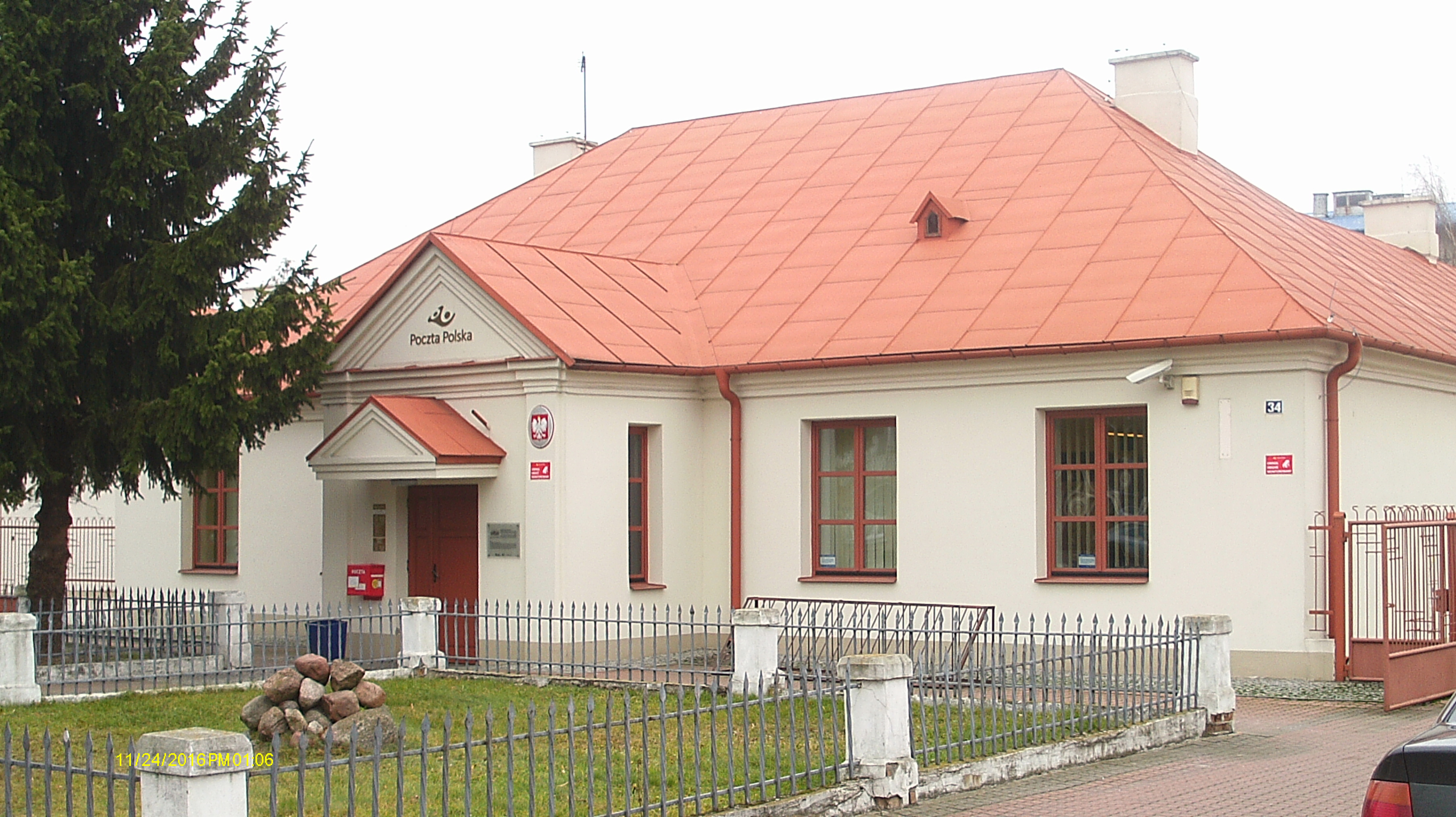
Old coaching inn, now a post office

In 1795, following the Third Partition of Poland, the town was annexed by the Habsburg Empire. In 1800, educator Grzegorz Piramowicz became the parish priest in Międzyrzec. Following the Polish victory in the Austro-Polish War of 1809, it was regained by Poles and included within the short-lived Duchy of Warsaw, and after the Congress of Vienna of 1815 it became part of so-called Congress Poland under the control of the Russian Tsar. Międzyrzec developed rapidly as a major trade hub in Podlachia, especially between 1830 and 1863. In 1867 it became a stop on the Polish railway system. By that time, Miedzyrzec was an important center of Greek Catholic Church: in 1772, Duke August Aleksander Czartoryski founded here Unite Church of St. Peter and Paul. Since mid-19th century, government of Russian-controlled Congress Poland initiated the process of Russification, aimed at the Uniates. As a result, two local Uniate churches were turned into Orthodox (1875).

During World War I, the town was occupied by Germany. On 16 November 1918, German troops committed a massacre of some 44 Poles, members of the Polish Military Organisation and civilians. German occupation ended on 17 November 1918, and the town was reintegrated with Poland, which regained independence a few days earlier.

A large Jewish community was present at least since the 16th century Międzyrzec. At the end of the 1930s in the reborn Polish Republic approximately 12,000 inhabitants, or 75% of its population, were Jewish.

=== World War II ===
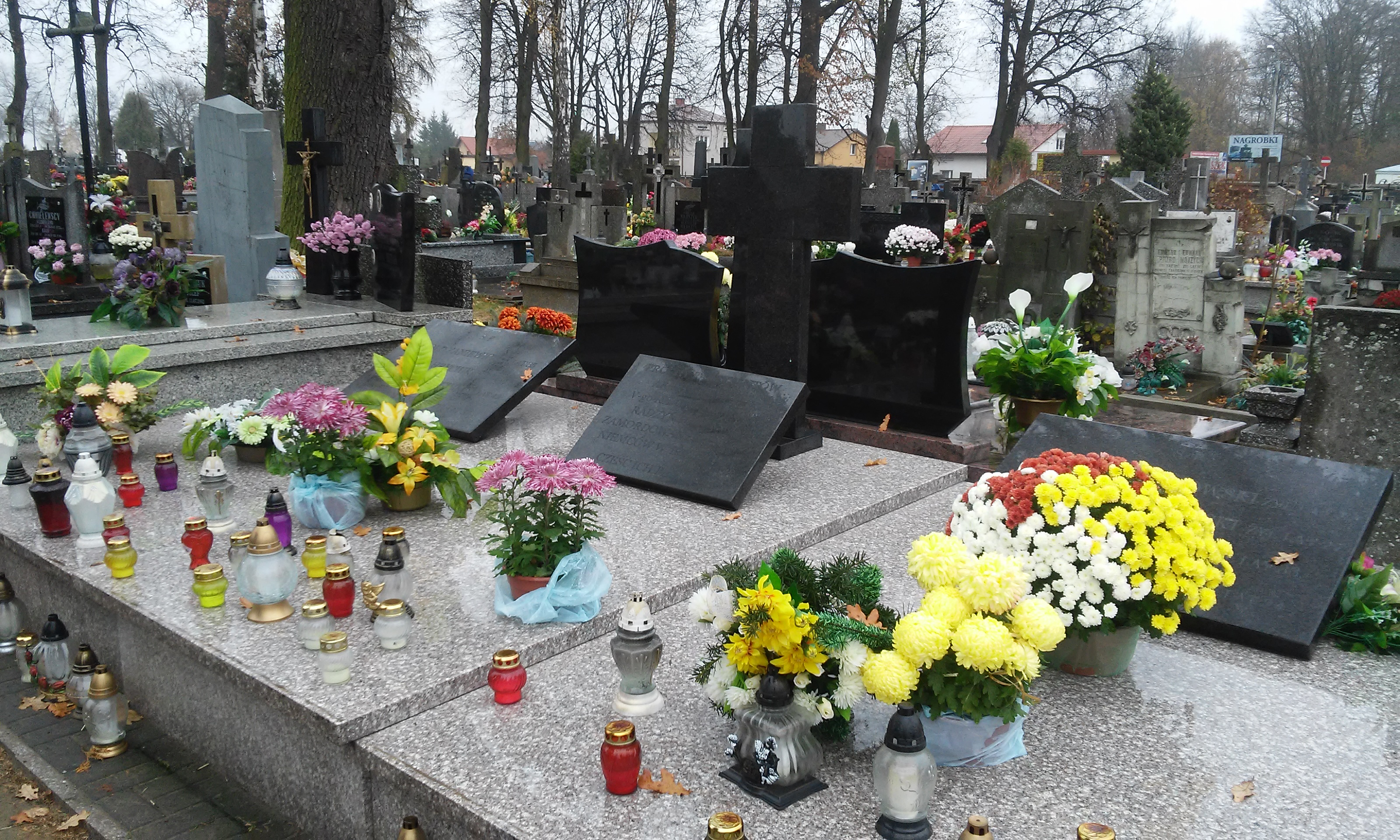
Mass grave of Polish partisans murdered by the German occupiers in 1943

In 1939, during the Nazi–Soviet Invasion of Poland, the town was overrun by Wehrmacht on 13 September 1939, and ceded to the Russians on 25 September, in accordance with the Molotov–Ribbentrop Pact. Two weeks later, it was transferred back to Germany after the new Boundary Treaty. In 1940 six separate slave labor camps were set up by the Nazis for some 2,000 local Jews; along with Judenrat, and the Jewish police. The German army entered the Soviet occupation zone on 22 June 1941 under the codename Operation Barbarossa. More Jews from the surrounding area including expellees from Kraków were shipped in. On 19 April 1942 the Jews were ordered by the Gestapo to turn over 50 kilograms (110 pounds) of gold within 3 days. Some 40 hostages were murdered on the streets. On 25–26 August 1942, the first mass deportation of Jews from Międzyrzec took place with around 10,000 prisoners forcibly put on 52 cattle cars (shipment #566 according to the German inventory) and sent to Treblinka extermination camp. Two days later, the Międzyrzec Podlaski Ghetto was established under the management of Judenrat. Several more mass deportation actions followed. On 17 July 1943, the ghetto was definitively liquidated, along with the local transit camp. Fewer than 1% of the Jewish population of the town survived the Nazi mass executions and deportations to death camps.

Pray sculpture

In 2009 a memorial for the 16,000 Jews who were murdered by the Nazis was established, and the sculpture "Pray" ("Tefila in Heb.) by Yael Artzi was installed in the town's center.

The German occupiers also operated a forced labour subcamp of the Stalag 366 prisoner-of-war camp, in which Italian POWs were held. On 23 July 1944, 60 remaining Italians from the subcamp were massacred by the Germans before their withdrawal from the town.

== Economy ==
Of the approximately 4,900 employed citizens of the town, ca. 36% work in industrial fields, 19% in trade markets, and 11% in education. The unemployment rate in the town was 22% in October 2005.

The town lies at the intersection of two important national roads: DK2 (Poland's main east–west connector) and DK19. In the future Expressway S19 will run just west of the town. A 6.6 km (4.10 mi) section of it already constructed as the town's bypass road and opened in 2008 allows north–south traffic on DK19 road to avoid the town centre.

== International relations ==
Międzyrzec Podlaski is referred to by various names in different languages including Yiddish: מעזריטש Mezri'tsh, Latin: Meserici, Belarusian: Міжрэчча, German: Meseritz, Latvian: Meņdzižeca Podlaska, Lithuanian: Palenkės Mendzyžecas, and Ukrainian: Межиріччя.

=== Twin towns and Sister cities ===
Międzyrzec Podlaski is twinned with:

- Thouars, France
- Kobryn, Belarus
- Malaryta, Belarus
- Pagiriai, Lithuania
- Ludza, Latvia
- Kamin-Kashyrskyi, Ukraine
- Petah Tikva, Israel

== Notable people ==
- Jan Brożek
- Adam Kazimierz Czartoryski
- August Aleksander Czartoryski
- Konstanty Adam Czartoryski
- Yehoshua Leib Diskin
- Morris Michael Edelstein
- Judah David Eisenstein
- Stanisław Jan Jabłonowski
- Jacob ben Wolf Kranz
- Kazimierz Kierzkowski
- Ryszard Kornacki
- Dominik Marczuk
- Sława Przybylska
- Moshe Rynecki
- Franciszek Stefaniuk
- Stanisław Żmijan
- Yitzhak Yaakov Wachtfogel (in Hebrew)
- Samson Zelig Rubinstein (Holocaust survivor buried in Wilmington, North Carolina)
- Rabbi Ephraim Eliezer Zvi Hersh Charlap (in Hebrew)
