= Circular tale =

Story whose beginning can follow its end

A circular tale or a circular song is a tale or song that can be repeated endlessly, because the last element of the narrative introduces the repetition of the first one.

An example, called "Circular Tale", from The Borzoi Book of French Folk Tales goes as follows:

Three brigands were seated on a stone. The youngest said to the oldest: "Tell us a story, Edward." And Edward began: "Four brigands were seated on a stone. The youngest said to the oldest: 'Tell us a story, Edward'. And Edward began: 'Five brigands were seated on a stone...'"

== Russian annoying tales ==
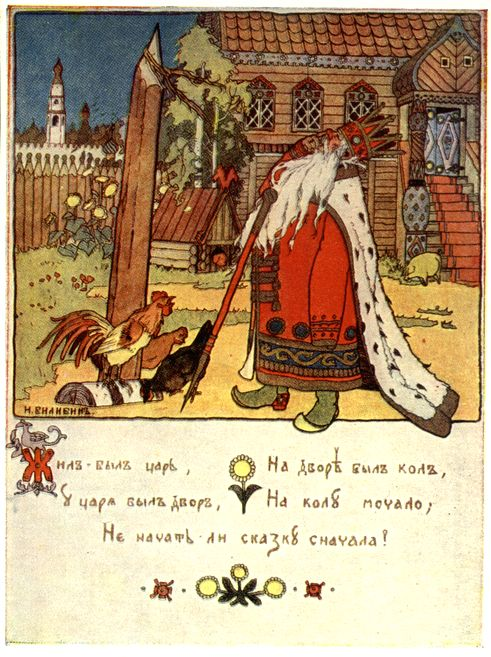
Ivan Bilibin: "Once upon a time there lived a tsar, In the tsar's yard there was a stake, On the stake there was bast; Should we start the tale from the beginning?" (It rhymes in Russian)

In Russian folkloristics, circular tales are known as "annoying skazka" (Докучная сказка), named so because it is supposed to annoy the listeners. The best known ones are the song "У попа была собака" ("A Priest Had a Dog") and "Сказка про белого бычка" ("A Tale about the White Calf"). The first one goes as follows: "A priest had a dog. He liked her. She ate a piece of meat, and he killed her. He buried her and put a note 'A priest had a dog. etc...'" The second one is actually is a verbal game with the intention to annoy the listener and is recorded by Russian folklorist Alexander Afanasyev in his Russian Fairy Tales:

Do you want me to tell you a story about a white calf?" - "Tell me." - "You tell me, and I'll tell you, should I tell you a story about a white calf?" - "Tell me." - "You tell me, and I'll tell you, what will happen to us, and how long will it be! Should I tell you a story about a white calf?"

This continues until one of the two gets bored. The story gave rise to the Russian idiomatic expression "a tale about the white calf" in reference to endless excuses or endless pointless repetitive discourse.

== Circular plot device ==
In a story with circular plot, the ending of the story is closely connected to its beginning, i.e., the story makes a full circle. This is because some stories with this kind of plot had the so-called ring composition as a literary technique that structures by opening a theme, developing it, and rounding the entire plot by bringing the conclusion back to the beginning. Circular narratives like these distort the form of temporality and causality so that the ending circles itself back to the starting point. Richard A. Lupoff's short story, 12:01 P.M., is an example of this circular plot device.

== Notable examples ==
- If You Give a Mouse a Cookie
- "There's a Hole in My Bucket"
- "The Song That Doesn't End"
- "Where Have All the Flowers Gone?"

== See also ==
- Cumulative song
- Repetitive song, a more general type of songs
  - "99 Bottles of Beer", a "reverse counting" song
- Repetition (rhetorical device)
- Groundhog Day
