= Ryszard Kornacki =

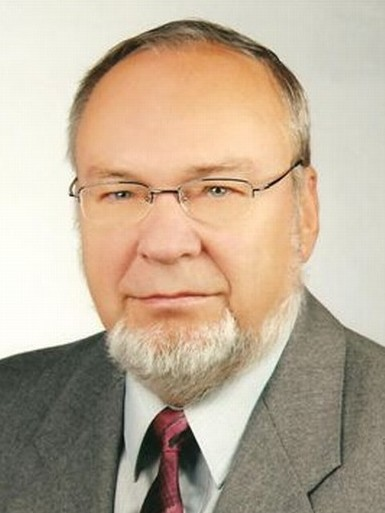
Ryszard Kornacki

Ryszard Kornacki (born 1940 in Lublin) is a Polish poet and essayist from Międzyrzec Podlaski.

- Wyjście z ciszy (1973),
- Szukanie człowieka (1975),
- Złote słońce słowa (1980),
- Puszka Pandory (1985),
- Miniatury (1988),
- Zapis dnia (1990),
- Słoneczna galeria przyrody - wiersze szczawnickie (1993),
- Czarna róża (baśnie i opowieści z Podlasia 1993),
- Wszystkie wątpliwości świata (1994),
- Na krawędzi absurdu (1995),
- Romeo Julia i czas (1997),
- Ciepły dotyk duszy (1999),
- Dopełnianie myśli (1999),
- Międzyrzec w życiorysy wpisany (I 2001, II 2003),
- Podlasie struna czysta (2002),
- Na skraju cienia (2003).
