= Erzsi Kovács =

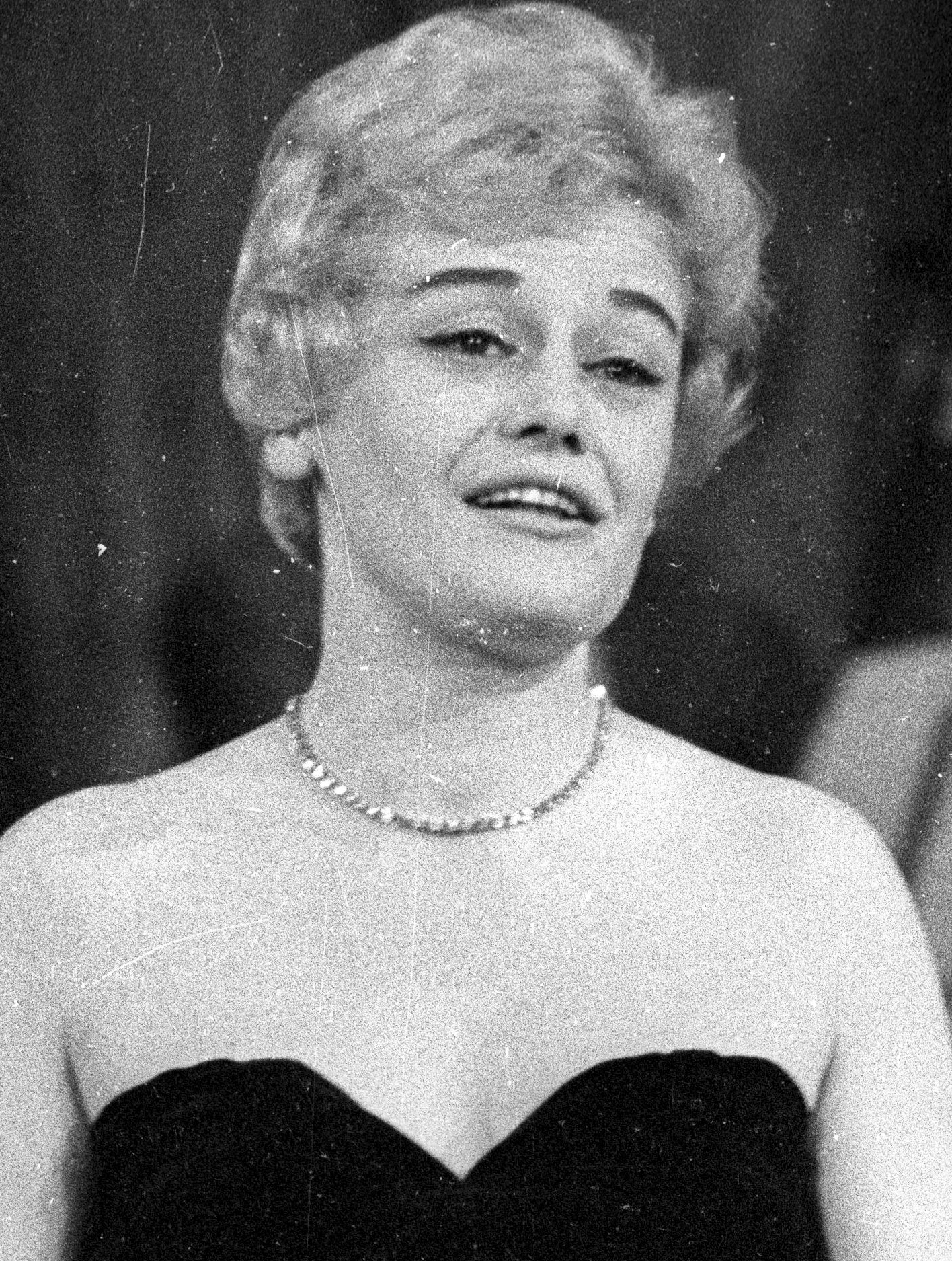
- Erzsi Kovács in 1959

Background information
- Born: Erzsébet Kovács; 2 June 1928; Budapest, Hungary
- Died: 6 April 2014 (aged 85) Budapest, Hungary
- Genres: jazz, blues, bossa nova
- Occupation: Singer
- Instrument: Vocals
- Years active: 1950s-2014
- Label: Qualiton

Erzsébet "Erzsi" Kovács DRH (2 June 1928 – 6 April 2014) was a Hungarian pop singer and performer. After an attempt to escape to the west in 1951, she was arrested and imprisoned for three years. Afterwards, she resumed her singing career. She recorded her last album, Mosolyogva búcsúzom (English title: I Leave with a Smile), aged 79. She was awarded the Order of Merit of the Republic of Hungary.

== Biography ==
In 1948, Kovács met and began an affair with football player Sándor Szűcs. As both were already married at that time, the state did not approve of the adulterous relationship. Szűcs was not called up to the Hungary national football team after 1948 and was told that continuing the relationship would put his career in jeopardy. The two made plans to escape to the west, something that other Hungarian footballers had already accomplished.

The couple found someone that would help them reach the west in exchange for a half pound of gold plus $5,000, if successful. On March 6, 1951, they left with their handler. Near Szombathely, they were stopped by a patrol, but made it through by showing their identification. A few minutes later, soldiers from the ÁVÓ placed both of them in custody. It turned out that the smuggler was an AVO agent and that the entire escape had been a trap.

In 1951, she was sentenced to four years in prison. Szűcs was treated more harshly. As a member of Újpest FC, the police-controlled team, he was also a commissioned police officer. Thus he ran afoul of a law that mandated life imprisonment or the death penalty for members of any armed service caught defecting. He was executed by hanging in 1951, despite interventions by famed teammates Ferenc Puskás and Ferenc Szusza.

Kovács was released from prison in 1954, and at first she worked as an administrator, then resumed her singing career. She toured with Lehel Németh and the Holéczy music group. Her first major success was with the song "Régi óra halkan jár" ("The Old Clock Ticks Softly") in 1957, but she already had a platinum record in 1955, with two and a half million of her records sold. In 1964, her record company dropped her, and she moved abroad. For the next 14 years, she sang in Germany, Sweden, and on cruise ships. After her return, she toured mainly in the countryside. She had several concerts at the Royal Park Stage, the Budapest Concert Hall and the Operetta Theatre in Budapest. On her album, Mosolyogva búcsúzom, she sang "Quand S'arrêtent les violons".

She died on 6 April 2014 at the age of 85. She was reportedly suffering from lung cancer.

== Discography ==
=== Albums ===
- Tűzpiros virág (1985) (Fiery Red Flower)
- Csavargó fantáziám (1989) (My Wandering Imagination)
- Gondolj néha rám (1989) (Think of Me Sometimes)
- Búcsúzni csak nagyon szépen szabad (1992) (Be Very Nice when Saying Goodbye)
- Hangulatban (1999) (In the Mood)
- Duett (duet album with Nelly Orosz) (2005)
- Donát úton nyílnak már az orgonák (2006) (Lilacs Are Blooming on Donát Street)
- Mosolyogva búcsúzom (2009) (I Leave with a Smile)

=== Compilations ===
- Legkedvesebb dalaim (1997) (Best of)
- Slágermúzeum (2012) (Song Museum)

=== Singles ===
- 1960 "Veled is megtörténhet egyszer" / "Megszerettelek"
- 1960 "Szeretlek Budapest" / "Rejtély"
- 1962 "Ha könnyezni látom a két szemed" / "Bámulom az eget"
- 1964 "Szóba sem jöhet más tánc" / "Kék öböl"
- 1964 "Hová tűnt a sok virág" / "Ki emlékszik rá"
