= We Shall Overcome (Bernie Sanders album) =

Album by Bernie Sanders

- BurlingTown cassette cover

Studio album by Bernie Sanders
- Released: December 12, 1987
- Recorded: November 1987
- Studio: White Crow Audio (Burlington, Vermont)
- Genre: Folk; spoken word
- Length: 26:31 (Side A)
- Label: BurlingTown
- Producer: Todd Lockwood; Douglas Jaffe

We Shall Overcome is an album by American politician Bernie Sanders, recorded and released in 1987. The album combined folk music and spoken word, narrated by Sanders. He was the mayor of Burlington, Vermont, at the time of the album's release. The album was remastered and re-released in 2014 and gained wide exposure during Sanders' 2016 presidential campaign.

== Background ==
In 1987, Burlington-based music producer Todd Lockwood was sipping coffee at Leunig's Bistro when he came up with the idea to approach the city's mayor, Bernie Sanders, to record a musical project at his studio, White Crow Audio. Lockwood wrote a letter to Mayor Sanders and a meeting was arranged at the mayor's office. Lockwood originally imagined the album as an audio portrait of Bernie Sanders, but Sanders saw it as an opportunity to tell a much larger story.

Sanders made a list of ten songs he would be willing to record, five of which made the cut for the album.

Because producer Lockwood found Sanders' musical skills inadequate to sing the folk songs on his own, he instead arranged for Sanders to speak the lyrics accompanied by a chorus of backup singers.

== Commercial performance ==
It is estimated that the 1987 cassette tape sold about 600 to 800 copies, out of 1,000 that were produced. The 2014 reissue has sold about 3,000 copies as of March 2016. The album reportedly landed Sanders at No. 116 on Billboard's Top New Artist chart in February 2016.

Sanders signed a record contract in 1987 that would guarantee him royalties for any profits made, but did not receive any at the time due to the album's high production costs. In 2016, Sanders earned $2,521 in royalties for his participation in the recording.

== Track listing ==
Side A
No.	Title	Length
1.	"Oh Freedom"	4:24
2.	"The Banks of Marble"	5:51
3.	"Where Have All the Flowers Gone"	5:48
4.	"This Land Is Your Land"	3:06
5.	"We Shall Overcome"	7:22

Side B
No.	Title	Length
6.	"A Conversation with Bernie Sanders"

== Personnel ==
Credits are taken from liner notes of We Shall Overcome.

=== Band ===
- Andy Shapiro – piano
- Tom Berd – organ
- Don Sidney – electric guitar
- Mark Ransom – electric bass
- Jeff Salisbury – drums

=== Guest musicians ===
- Howard Mitchell – background vocals, chorus
- Ginny Peck – background vocals, chorus
- Emily Wadhams – background vocals, chorus
- David Weaver – background vocals, chorus
- Steve Rainville – background vocals
- Chris Bailey – chorus
- Nancy Beaven – chorus
- Marcia Brewster – chorus
- Dexter Brown – chorus
- Kathy Carbone – chorus
- Danny Coane – chorus
- Joanne "Little Joyce" Cooper – chorus
- David Daignault – chorus
- Frank Egan – chorus
- Dana Lavigne – chorus
- Tom Lyon – chorus
- Joe Moore – chorus
- Rick Norcross – chorus
- Michael Oakland – chorus
- Debbie Patton – chorus
- Pamela Polston – chorus
- KK Wilder – chorus

=== Narrative ===
- Bernie Sanders

=== Arrangements ===
- Don Sidney – musical
- Douglas Jaffe – harmony vocals

=== Technical personnel ===
- Chuck Eller – engineering
- Todd Lockwood – engineering, production
- Douglas Jaffe – production
- Adam Ayan – digital mastering
- Gateway Mastering – digital mastering

=== Artistic personnel ===
- Glenn Russell – photograph

== Release history ==
Region	Date	Format	Label	Ref.
United States	December 12, 1987	Cassette	BurlingTown	
United States	December 1, 2014	CD	Todd R. Lockwood Works	
Worldwide	December 1, 2014	Digital download	Todd R. Lockwood Works	

== See also ==
- American folk music
- Mayoralty of Bernie Sanders
