= Always Remember (album) =

Studio album by Bill Anderson
- Released: April 1971
- Recorded: 1970–1971
- Studios: Bradley's Barn, Mount Juliet, Tennessee
- Genres: Country; Nashville Sound
- Label: Decca Records
- Producer: Owen Bradley

Bill Anderson chronology
Where Have All Our Heroes Gone (1970)	Always Remember (1971)	Bill Anderson's Greatest Hits, Vol. 2 (1971)

Singles from Always Remember
- 1. "Always Remember" Released: January 1971

Always Remember is a studio album by American country singer-songwriter Bill Anderson. It was released in April 1971 on Decca Records and was produced by Owen Bradley. His sixteenth studio effort, it was also Anderson's only studio album to be released in 1971. The title track became a single and a top ten hit on the Billboard country chart. The album would also reach peak positions on the albums chart too.

== Background and content ==
Always Remember was recorded at Bradley's Barn studio located in Mount Juliet, Tennessee and owned by Owen Bradley, Anderson's producer. It was Anderson's sixteenth studio recording with Bradley and sixteenth album released in his career. A total of 11 tracks were recorded for the album. The album's compositions were intended to focus on the themes of "love, loss and lasting love." Anderson's wife at the time was featured on the album cover. The album included a cover version of Sammi Smith's hit single, "Help Me Make It Through the Night". The album also included a cover version of Anne Murray's "A Stranger in My Place", which was co-written by Kenny Rogers. Anderson also composed five of the album's tracks. Kris Kristofferson is also a featured writer in the project.

== Release and reception ==
Professional ratings
Review scores
Source	Rating
Allmusic	3/5 stars

Always Remember was released in April 1971 on Decca Records. It was issued as a vinyl record, with six songs on side one and five songs on side two. The album spent a total of 13 weeks on the Billboard Top Country Albums before peaking at number 13 in June.

The title track was the only single issued from the album. It peaked at number six on the Billboard Hot Country Singles chart in April 1971. The single also became a major hit in Canada, reaching number five on the RPM Country Singles chart. In later years, the album was reviewed by Greg Adams of Allmusic, who gave the collection three out of five stars. Adams described Anderson's vocal style as having "an aura of honesty", mentioning "Help Me Make It Through the Night" to be his best example of this. He also commented that listeners may be surprised by the album. "Always Remember confounds expectations not only because it is a very good album, but because it achieves this out of seemingly ordinary materials," Adams said.

== Track listing ==
Side one
No.	Title	Writer(s)	Length
1.	"Always Remember"	Jerry Bradley; Patsy Lawley	2:16
2.	"The Kind of Needin' I Need"	Bill Anderson	2:15
3.	"When I Loved Her"	Kris Kristofferson	2:38
4.	"A Stranger in My Place"	Kenny Rogers; Kin Vassy	2:50
5.	"One Too Many Mornings"	Mike Settle	2:00
6.	"You're Still the Only One I'll Ever Love"	Anderson	2:34

Side two
No.	Title	Writer(s)	Length
1.	"I'm Alright"	Anderson	2:15
2.	"Come Sundown"	Kristofferson	2:36
3.	"Feel Free to Go"	Anderson	2:45
4.	"Help Me Make It Through the Night"	Kristofferson	2:10
5.	"Lonesome Is the Mother of Soul"	Anderson	2:56

== Personnel ==
All credits are adapted from the liner notes of Always Remember.

- Bill Anderson – lead vocals
- Hal Bauksbaum – photography
- Owen Bradley – record producer

== Chart performance ==
Chart (1971)	Peak position
US Top Country Albums (Billboard)	13

== Release history ==
Region	Date	Format	Label	Ref.
United States	June 1970	Vinyl	Decca	
United Kingdom	June 1970	Vinyl	MCA	
