= Where Have All Our Heroes Gone =

Studio album by Bill Anderson
- Released: December 1970
- Recorded: August 1970
- Studios: Bradley's Barn, Mount Juliet, Tennessee
- Genres: Country; Nashville Sound
- Label: Decca
- Producer: Owen Bradley

Bill Anderson chronology
Love Is a Sometimes Thing (1970)	Where Have All Our Heroes Gone (1970)	Always Remember (1971)

Singles from Where Have All Our Heroes Gone
- 1. "Where Have All Our Heroes Gone" Released: September 1970

Where Have All Our Heroes Gone is a studio album by American country singer-songwriter Bill Anderson. It was released in December 1970 on Decca Records and was produced by Owen Bradley. It was Anderson's fifteenth studio album as a recording artist and his third studio album released in 1970. The album's title track became a major hit on the Billboard country chart. The album itself would also reach peak positions on the Billboard country albums chart.

== Background and content ==
Where Have All Our Heroes Gone was recorded in August 1970 at Bradley's Barn studio in Mount Juliet, Tennessee and produced by the studio's owner, Owen Bradley. It was Anderson's fifteenth studio album and fifth to be produced by Bradley The album consisted of 11 tracks. The project was designed to be a collection of recitation songs. Anderson presented the title track as which impressed Bradley and other engineers on the project. From the title track, an album was built around it. Three additional songs on the album were composed by Anderson. Other songs were cover versions of songs recorded by others. Among these tracks was Ray Price's "For the Good Times" and Kris Kristofferson's "Me and Bobby McGee".

== Release and reception ==
Where Have All the Heroes Gone was released in December 1970 and was his third studio album released that year. It was issued as a vinyl LP, with five songs on side one and six songs on side two of the record. The album spent a total of 11 weeks on the Billboard Top Country Albums chart before peaking at number 27 in April 1971. The title track was the only single released from the album. Issued in September 1970, the song reached number six on the Billboard Hot Country Singles chart by December. It also reached a peak of number 93 on the Billboard Hot 100, one of his few singles to chart on that list. It also reached number 9 on the RPM Country Singles chart in Canada. In later years the album would be reviewed by Allmusic, which gave it a rating of 3.5 out of 5 possible stars.

== Track listing ==
Side one
No.	Title	Writer(s)	Length
1.	"Where Have All Our Heroes Gone"	Bill Anderson; Bob Talbert	4:59
2.	"For the Good Times"	Kris Kristofferson	3:23
3.	"Loving a Memory"	Anderson	2:45
4.	"Me and Bobby McGee"	Fred Foster; Kristofferson	2:35
5.	"And Then Came the Bad Years"	Steve Karliski	2:35

Side two
No.	Title	Writer(s)	Length
1.	"All I Have to Offer You Is Me"	Dallas Frazier; Arthur Leo Owens	2:49
2.	"Poison Red Berries"	Mickey Newbury	3:38
3.	"I Can't Go Anywhere But Wrong"	Anderson	2:10
4.	"I'll Bring More Flowers"	Anderson; Bobby Runnell	2:18
5.	"Melinda"	Jerry Crutchfield; Jimmy Gateley	2:43
6.	"Friends"	Dick Bowman; Glen Campbell	3:02

== Personnel ==
All credits are adapted from the liner notes of Where Have All Our Heroes Gone.

Musical personnel

- Bill Anderson – lead vocals
- Harold Bradley – guitar
- Ray Edenton – guitar
- Buddy Harman – drums
- Roy Huskey – bass
- The Jordanaires – background vocals
- Grady Martin – guitar
- Hargus "Pig" Robbins – piano
- Hal Rugg – steel guitar
- Pete Wade – guitar

Technical personnel

- Owen Bradley – record producer

== Chart performance ==
Chart (1970–1971)	Peak position
US Top Country Albums (Billboard)	27

== Release history ==
Region	Date	Format	Label	Ref.
United States	June 1970	Vinyl	Decca	
United Kingdom	June 1970	Vinyl	MCA	
