= Where Have All Our Heroes Gone (song) =

Single by Bill Anderson

from the album Where Have All Our Heroes Gone
- B-side: "Loving a Memory"
- Released: September 1970
- Recorded: June 30, 1970
- Studio: Bradley Studio
- Genre: Country; Nashville Sound
- Length: 2:59
- Label: Decca
- Songwriters: Bill Anderson; Bob Talbert
- Producer: Owen Bradley

Bill Anderson singles chronology
"Someday We'll Be Together" (1970)	"Where Have All Our Heroes Gone" (1970)	"Always Remember" (1971)

"Where Have All Our Heroes Gone" is a song written and first recorded by American country singer-songwriter Bill Anderson. It was also co-composed with Bob Talbert. It was released as a single in 1970 via Decca Records and became a major hit the same year.

== Background and release ==
"Where Have All Our Heroes Gone" was recorded on June 30, 1970, at the Bradley Studio, located in Nashville, Tennessee. The sessions were produced by Owen Bradley, who would serve as Anderson's producer through most of years with Decca Records. A second track entitled "And Then Came Bad Days" was recorded at the same session.

"Where Have All Our Heroes Gone" was released as a single by Decca Records in September 1970. The song spent 14 weeks on the Billboard Hot Country Singles before reaching number six in December 1970. It was also among his final singles to reach the Billboard Hot 100, reaching number 93 after three weeks on the chart. In Canada, the single reached number nine on the RPM Country Songs chart. It was later released on his 1970 studio album, also called Where Have All Our Heroes Gone.

== Track listings ==
7" vinyl single

- "Where Have All Our Heroes Gone" – 2:59
- "Loving a Memory" – 2:45

== Chart performance ==
Chart (1970)	Peak position
Canada Country Songs (RPM)	9
US Billboard Hot 100	93
US Hot Country Songs (Billboard)	6
