= Always Remember (Bill Anderson song) =

Single by Bill Anderson

from the album Always Remember
- B-side: "You Can Change My World"
- Released: January 1971
- Recorded: March 19, 1970
- Studio: Bradley Studio
- Genre: Country; Nashville Sound
- Length: 2:16
- Label: Decca
- Songwriters: Jerry Bradley; Patsy Lawley
- Producer: Owen Bradley

Bill Anderson singles chronology
| "Where Have All Our Heroes Gone" (1970) | "Always Remember" (1971) | "Quits" (1971) |

"Always Remember" is a song written by Jerry Bradley and Patsy Lawley. It was first recorded by American country singer-songwriter Bill Anderson. It was released as a single in 1971 via Decca Records and became a major hit the same year.

== Background and release ==
"Always Remember" was recorded on March 19, 1970, at the Bradley Studio, located in Nashville, Tennessee. The sessions were produced by Owen Bradley, who would serve as Anderson's producer through most of years with Decca Records. Two additional tracks were recorded at the same session: "The Shirt" and "You and Your Sweet Love."

"Always Remember" was released as a single by Decca Records in January 1971. The song spent 15 weeks on the Billboard Hot Country Singles before reaching number six in April 1971. In Canada, the single reached number five on the RPM Country Songs chart. It was later released on his 1970 studio album, also called Always Remember.

== Track listings ==
7" vinyl single

- "Always Remember" – 2:16
- "You Can Change My World" – 2:35

== Chart performance ==
| Chart (1970) | Peak position |
|---|---|
| Canada Country Songs (RPM) | 5 |
| US Hot Country Songs (Billboard) | 6 |
