= Oppenheim Toy Portfolio =

Award for children's media

The Oppenheim Toy Portfolio is an independent consumer reviewer of children's media. It was founded in 1989 by child development authors Joanne Oppenheim and her daughter Stephanie Oppenheim. The company publishes a newsletter, and grants the annual Oppenheim Toy Portfolio Award for toys.

== Books ==
After publishing their newsletter, the Oppenheims published their first book (The Best Toys, Books, Videos and Music for Kids) together with HarperCollins in 1994. They formed their own publishing company in 1998 and began publishing what would become their annual Oppenheim Toy Portfolio guide book. The company also publishes the Read It! Play It! series on childhood literacy.

== Award ==
The awards granted by The Oppenheim Toy Portfolio cover topics including Toys, Books, Video, Audio, Computers, and special categories like Special Needs, Green Products, and Multicultural Products. Topics are further divided into four age groups: Infants, Toddlers, Preschoolers, and Early School Years.

The annual Oppenheim Toy Portfolio guide books collate reviews on all award winning products as well as those that had been listed in the magazine as "Mixed Emotions".
