= 1969 in country music =

This is a list of notable events in country music that took place in 1969.

== Events ==
- January 4 – Dolly Parton becomes a member of The Grand Ole Opry.
- January 29 – The Glen Campbell Goodtime Hour premieres on CBS, for what will be a three-year run.
- February 16 – George Jones and Tammy Wynette marry in Ringgold, Georgia, after telling others that their marriage was in August 1968. They quickly earn the titles such as "The First Couple of Country Music", "Country's Sweethearts" and "The President and First Lady".
- February 24 – Johnny Cash records his second live album behind prison walls in as many years at San Quentin State Prison. The resulting album is At San Quentin, and contains his hit "A Boy Named Sue." The concert is also taped for television broadcast.
- June 7 – The Johnny Cash Show premieres on ABC; the series will run through 1971.
- June 15 – The summer replacement series Hee Haw airs for the first time on CBS. The first guests to Kornfield Kounty – for what will be a 23-year run, the bulk of which will be in syndication – are Charley Pride and Loretta Lynn.
- October – The Country Music Association airs its awards program live for the first time (the previous year's ceremony was taped, with the show airing a few weeks later). The annual awards show — at the time airing in October on NBC – quickly becomes one of country music's most eagerly anticipated events of the year.
- December 23 – Willie Nelson's home near Ridgeview, Tennessee, burns to the ground. Nelson enters the burning house to retrieve his guitar (later nicknamed "Trigger") and a pound of Colombian grass.

=== No dates ===
- Tammy Wynette, who during the year becomes a member of the Grand Ole Opry, becomes the first female country artist to sell over one million copies of a single recording with her Tammy's Greatest Hits collection.

== Top hits of the year ==
=== Number-one hits ===
==== United States ====
(as certified by Billboard)

Date	Single Name	Artist	Wks. No.1	CAN peak	Spec. Note
January 4	Daddy Sang Bass	Johnny Cash	6
February 15	Until My Dreams Come True	Jack Greene	2	5
March 1	To Make Love Sweeter For You	Jerry Lee Lewis	1	4
March 8	Only the Lonely	Sonny James	3
March 29	Who's Gonna Mow Your Grass	Buck Owens	2
April 12	Woman of the World (Leave My World Alone)	Loretta Lynn	1	—
April 19	Galveston	Glen Campbell	3
May 10	Hungry Eyes	Merle Haggard	1	2
May 17	My Life (Throw It Away If I Want To)	Bill Anderson	2	2	^{[1]}
May 31	Singing My Song	Tammy Wynette	2
June 14	Running Bear	Sonny James	3
July 5	Statue of a Fool	Jack Greene	2	3	^{[B]}
July 19	I Love You More Today	Conway Twitty	1	2
July 26	Johnny B. Goode	Buck Owens	2	4
August 9	All I Have to Offer You Is Me	Charley Pride	1	3	^{[A]}
August 16	Workin' Man's Blues	Merle Haggard	1
August 23	A Boy Named Sue	Johnny Cash	5
September 27	Tall Dark Stranger	Buck Owens	1
October 4	Since I Met You Baby	Sonny James	3	3
October 25	The Ways to Love a Man	Tammy Wynette	2
November 8	To See My Angel Cry	Conway Twitty	1
November 15	Okie From Muskogee	Merle Haggard	4	3
December 13	(I'm So) Afraid of Losing You Again	Charley Pride	3

Notes

- 1 No. 1 song of the year, as determined by Billboard.
- A First Billboard No. 1 hit for that artist.
- B Last Billboard No. 1 hit for that artist.

==== Canada ====
(as certified by RPM)

Date	Single Name	Artist	Wks. No.1	U.S. peak	Spec. Note
January 13	Wichita Lineman	Glen Campbell	2
January 27	I Take a Lot of Pride in What I Am	Merle Haggard	3	3	^{[2]}: Stayed at No. 1 for 2 weeks in late 1968.; Fell to #2 on the week of January 13, 1969.
February 3	The Carroll County Accident	Porter Wagoner	3	2	^{[A]}
February 24	Mr. Brown	Gary Buck	3	—	^{[2]}: Fell to #2 on the week of March 3.
March 3	Daddy Sang Bass	Johnny Cash	1
March 10	The Girl Most Likely	Jeannie C. Riley	1	6	^{[B]}
March 31	While Your Lover Sleeps	Leon Ashley	1	25	^{[C]}
April 7	Kaw-Liga	Charley Pride	2	3	^{[A]}
April 21	The Name of the Game Was Love	Hank Snow	1	16	^{[A]}
April 28	Only the Lonely	Sonny James	1
May 5	Who's Gonna Mow Your Grass	Buck Owens	1
May 12	My Woman's Good to Me	David Houston	1	4
May 19	Galveston	Glen Campbell	1
May 26	Let It Be Me	Bobbie Gentry and Glen Campbell	1	14	^{[A] – Bobbie Gentry}
June 2	It's a Sin	Marty Robbins	1	5
June 9	Who Drinks My Beer When I'm Gone	Mercey Brothers	1	—
June 16	Cajun Love	Lucille Starr	1	—	^{[B]}
June 23	Ribbon of Darkness	Connie Smith	1	13	^{[A]}
June 30	Singing My Song	Tammy Wynette	1
July 7	Rings of Gold	Dottie West and Don Gibson	1	2	^{[A] – Dottie West}^{[A] – Don Gibson}
July 14	Running Bear	Sonny James	1
July 21	The Days of Sand and Shovels	Waylon Jennings	1	20
July 28	One Has My Name (The Other Has My Heart)	Jerry Lee Lewis	1	3
August 2	Canadian Pacific	George Hamilton IV	3	25	^{[A]}
August 23	A Boy Named Sue	Johnny Cash	4
September 20	True Grit	Glen Campbell	1	9
September 27	Workin' Man's Blues	Merle Haggard	1
October 4	Invitation to Your Party	Jerry Lee Lewis	2	6	^{[2]}: Fell to #5 on the week of October 11.
October 11	Muddy Mississippi Line	Bobby Goldsboro	1	15	^{[B]}
October 18	Tall Dark Stranger	Buck Owens	1
October 25	The Ways to Love a Man	Tammy Wynette	1
November 8	To See My Angel Cry	Conway Twitty	1		^{[A]}
November 15	Get Rhythm	Johnny Cash	2	23
November 29	Groovy Grubworm	Harlow Wilcox	1	42	^{[C]}
December 6	Try a Little Kindness	Glen Campbell	1	2
December 13	She Even Woke Me Up to Say Goodbye	Jerry Lee Lewis	1	2
December 20	Diggy Liggy Lo	Doug Kershaw	1	70	^{[C]}
December 27	(I'm So) Afraid of Losing You Again	Charley Pride	1

Notes

- 2 Song dropped from No. 1 and later returned to top spot.
- A First RPM No. 1 hit for that artist.
- B Last RPM No. 1 hit for that artist.
- C Only RPM No. 1 hit for that artist.

=== Other major hits ===
==== Singles released by American artists ====
US	CAN	Single	Artist
9	—	All for the Love of a Girl	Claude King
72	16	All Heaven Broke Loose	Hugh X. Lewis
16	—	Always, Always	Porter Wagoner and Dolly Parton
25	2	Another Day, Another Mile, Another Highway	Clay Hart
14	—	April's Fool	Ray Price
11	—	Are You from Dixie (Cause I'm from Dixie Too)	Jerry Reed
51	7	The Auctioneer	Brenda Byers
16	21	A Baby Again	Hank Williams, Jr.
4	22	Back in the Arms of Love	Jack Greene
26	4	Back to Denver	George Hamilton IV
4	4	The Ballad of Forty Dollars	Tom T. Hall
5	—	Be Glad	Del Reeves
3	—	Big Wind	Porter Wagoner
13	38	Bring Me Sunshine	Willie Nelson
19	—	But for Love	Eddy Arnold
2	6	But You Know I Love You	Bill Anderson
3	—	Cajun Baby	Hank Williams, Jr.
11	—	California Girl (And the Tennessee Square)	Tompall & the Glaser Brothers
14	—	Custody	Hank Williams, Jr.
15	—	Cut Across Shorty	Nat Stuckey
2	2	Darling You Know I Wouldn't Lie	Conway Twitty
27	11	Don't It Make You Want to Go Home	Joe South
9	—	Don't Let Me Cross Over	Jerry Lee Lewis and Linda Gail Lewis
23	17	Don't Wake Me I'm Dreaming	Warner Mack
16	—	Each Time	Johnny Bush
11	27	Flattery Will Get You Everywhere	Lynn Anderson
18	14	Friend, Lover, Woman, Wife	Claude King
20	—	From the Bottle to the Bottom	Billy Walker
2	—	Games People Play	Freddy Weller
10	4	George (And the North Woods)	Dave Dudley
16	—	God Bless America Again	Bobby Bare
18	—	Good Deal, Lucille	Carl Smith
3	20	Good Time Charlie's	Del Reeves
22	17	A Hammer and Nails	Jimmy Dean
47	10	Happiness Hill	Kitty Wells
11	3	Haunted House	The Compton Brothers
5	—	Homecoming	Tom T. Hall
17	40	Honey, I'm Home	Stan Hitchcock
8	5	I Can't Say Goodbye	Marty Robbins
14	—	I Love You Because	Carl Smith
19	—	I Want One	Jack Reno
4	6	I'd Rather Be Gone	Hank Williams, Jr.
2	2	I'll Share My World with You	George Jones
8	—	I'll Still Be Missing You	Warner Mack
3	4	I'm Down to My Last "I Love You"	David Houston
6	16	If Not for You	George Jones
50	12	In the Ghetto	Dolly Parton
—	12	It's My Time	Frank Ifield
66	5	Jesus Is a Soul Man	Billy Grammer
13	—	Joe and Mabel's 12th Street Bar and Grill	Nat Stuckey
12	—	Just Hold My Hand	Johnny & Jonie Mosby
5	20	Just Someone I Used to Know	Porter Wagoner and Dolly Parton
9	6	Kay	John Wesley Ryles
6	—	Leave My Dream Alone	Warner Mack
20	—	Let the Whole World Sing It with Me	Wynn Stewart
10	17	Little Boy Sad	Bill Phillips
23	11	MacArthur Park	Waylon Jennings and The Kimberlys
17	—	Man and Wife Time	Jim Ed Brown
4	7	(Margie's At) The Lincoln Park Inn	Bobby Bare
12	3	Me and Bobby McGee	Roger Miller
4	10	Mr. Walker, It's All Over	Billie Jo Spears
20	—	My Big Iron Skillet	Wanda Jackson
14	—	My Grass Is Green	Roy Drusky
15	28	My Son	Jan Howard
25	13	"Never More" Quote the Raven	Stonewall Jackson
8	11	None of My Business	Henson Cargill
15	16	Old Faithful	Mel Tillis
12	—	One More Mile	Dave Dudley
18	3	Our House Is Not a Home (For It's Never Been Loved In)	Lynn Anderson
10	3	Please Don't Go	Eddy Arnold
10	6	Please Let Me Prove (My Love for You)	Dave Dudley
14	—	Raining in My Heart	Ray Price
20	—	Restless	Carl Perkins
46	12	Reuben James	Kenny Rogers and The First Edition
23	12	River Bottom	Johnny Darrell
39	2	Ruby, Don't Take Your Love to Town	Kenny Rogers and The First Edition
40	4	September Song	Roy Clark
18	34	Seven Lonely Days	Jean Shepard
19	—	Ship in the Bottle	Stonewall Jackson
5	9	Smokey the Bar	Hank Thompson
12	—	Smoky Places	Billy Walker
19	—	Something's Wrong in California	Waylon Jennings
7	42	Such a Fool	Roy Drusky
8	4	Sweet Thang and Cisco	Nat Stuckey
11	8	Sweetheart of the Year	Ray Price
38	14	Take My Hand for a While	George Hamilton IV
2	2	That's a No No	Lynn Anderson
16	11	That's Why I Love You So Much	Ferlin Husky
5	12	There Was Never a Time	Jeannie C. Riley
12	—	There Wouldn't Be a Lonely Heart in Town	Del Reeves
20	—	There's Better Things in Life	Jerry Reed
5	—	These Are Not My People	Freddy Weller
9	13	These Lonely Hands of Mine	Mel Tillis
10	2	They Don't Make Love Like They Used To	Eddy Arnold
34	3	Things Go Better with Love	Jeannie C. Riley
14	17	This Thing	Webb Pierce
3	4	To Make a Man (Feel Like a Man)	Loretta Lynn
44	2	Truck Stop	Jerry Smith
15	5	Vance	Roger Miller
20	—	We Had All the Good Things Going	Jan Howard
19	—	What Are Those Things (With Big Black Wings)	Charlie Louvin
2	2	When the Grass Grows Over Me	George Jones
6	4	When Two Worlds Collide	Jim Reeves
14	14	Where Have All the Average People Gone	Roger Miller
10	16	Where the Blue and Lonely Go	Roy Drusky
19	—	Which One Will It Be	Bobby Bare
18	—	Who's Gonna Take the Garbage Out	Ernest Tubb and Loretta Lynn
10	11	Who's Julie	Mel Tillis
17	—	Why You Been Gone So Long	Johnny Darrell
2	3	Wine Me Up	Faron Young
20	—	Woman Without Love	Johnny Darrell
19	—	World-Wide Travelin' Man	Wynn Stewart
9	2	Yesterday, When I Was Young	Roy Clark
6	—	You and Your Sweet Love	Connie Smith
7	—	You Gave Me a Mountain	Johnny Bush
20	—	Young Love	Connie Smith and Nat Stuckey
4	—	Your Time's Comin'	Faron Young
5	5	Yours Love	Waylon Jennings
9	—	Yours Love	Porter Wagoner and Dolly Parton

==== Singles released by Canadian artists ====
US	CAN	Single	Artist
—	13	Baby's Come Home	Debbie Lori Kaye
—	3	Back in Town to Stay	Mona Vary
—	9	Bittersweet	Donna Ramsay
—	13	Can't Find a Space	Tommy Hunter
—	6	The Entertainer	Ray Griff
—	13	I'm Gonna Let George Do It	Dianne Leigh
—	8	Keep the Home Fires Burning	Dianne Leigh
—	16	The Laughing Song	B. J. Berg
—	10	No Lonelier Than You	Billy Charne
—	3	Ordinary Peeping Tom	Mercey Brothers
—	20	Pineville Country Jail	Harry Rusk
—	17	The Revenuer's Daughter	Bob King
—	11	Some Kind of Lonesome	Country Tigers
—	8	Susie's Better Half	Billy Charne
—	19	Sweet Sweet Feeling	Clint Curtiss
—	18	Wanderin' Through the Valley	Ray Griff
—	9	When You Were a Lady	Billy Charne
—	14	Wishing Tree	Lynn Jones
—	19	You're My Woman	Blake Emmons

== Top new album releases ==
Album	Artist	Record Label
At Home with Lynn	Lynn Anderson	Chart
The Carroll County Accident	Porter Wagoner	RCA
From the Heart	Diana Trask	Dot
It's a Sin	Marty Robbins	Columbia
Jan Howard	Jan Howard	Decca
Miss Country Soul	Diana Trask	Dot
Mr. Walker, It's All Over!	Billie Jo Spears	Capitol
My Blue Ridge Mountain Boy	Dolly Parton	RCA
My Life/But You Know I Love You	Bill Anderson	Decca
Songs That Made Country Girls Famous	Lynn Anderson	Chart
The Bill Anderson Story: His Greatest Hits	Bill Anderson	Decca
With Love, from Lynn	Lynn Anderson	Chart
Yearbooks and Yesterdays	Jeannie C. Riley	Plantation

== Births ==
- January 3 – Nikki Nelson, female lead vocalist of the band Highway 101 (on and off since the early 1990s).
- March 28 – Rodney Atkins, singer-songwriter since the mid to late 2000s (decade).
- March 29 – Brady Seals, singer, keyboardist and member of Little Texas from 1988 to 1994.
- April 20 – Wade Hayes, honky tonk-styled singer of the mid-to-late 1990s.
- August 19 – Clay Walker, neotraditionalist who began enjoying hits in the mid-1990s.
- September 28 – Karen Fairchild, member of Little Big Town.
- October 12 – Martie Maguire, member of the Dixie Chicks (she plays the fiddle, mandolin and viola).
- October 13 – Rhett Akins, singer who enjoyed most of his success in the mid-1990s, and later became a prolific songwriter; father of Thomas Rhett.
- October 15 – Kimberly Schlapman, member of Little Big Town.

== Deaths ==
- September 11 – Leon Payne, 52, singer and prolific songwriter ("I Love You Because", "You've Still Got a Place in My Heart" and many others).
- November 23 – Spade Cooley, 59, singer/songwriter/fiddler of the 1940s; best known for "Detour" and "Shame on You." (heart attack)

== Country Music Hall of Fame Inductees ==
- Gene Autry (1907–1998)
- Bill Monroe (1911–1996)

== Major awards ==
=== Grammy Awards ===
- Best Female Country Vocal Performance — "Stand by Your Man", Tammy Wynette
- Best Male Country Vocal Performance — "A Boy Named Sue", Johnny Cash
- Best Country Performance by a Duo or Group with Vocal — "MacArthur Park", Waylon Jennings and The Kimberleys
- Best Country Instrumental Performance — The Nashville Brass featuring Danny Davis Play More Nashville Sounds, Danny Davis and the Nashville Brass
- Best Country Song — "A Boy Named Sue", Shel Silverstein (Performer: Johnny Cash)

=== Academy of Country Music ===
- Single of the Year — "Okie from Muskogee", Merle Haggard
- Album of the Year — Okie from Muskogee, Merle Haggard
- Top Male Vocalist — Merle Haggard
- Top Female Vocalist — Tammy Wynette
- Top Vocal Duo — Merle Haggard and Bonnie Owens
- Top Vocal Group — The Kimberleys
- Top New Male Vocalist — Freddy Weller
- Top New Female Vocalist — Donna Fargo

=== Country Music Association ===
- Entertainer of the Year — Johnny Cash
- Song of the Year — "The Carroll County Accident", Bob Ferguson (Performer: Porter Wagoner)
- Single of the Year — "A Boy Named Sue", Johnny Cash
- Album of the Year — At San Quentin, Johnny Cash
- Male Vocalist of the Year — Johnny Cash
- Female Vocalist of the Year — Tammy Wynette
- Vocal Group of the Year — Johnny Cash and June Carter
- Instrumentalist of the Year — Chet Atkins
- Instrumental Group of the Year — Danny Davis and the Nashville Brass
- Comedian of the Year — Archie Campbell

== Other links ==
- Country Music Association
- Inductees of the Country Music Hall of Fame
