= List of RPM number-one country singles of 1969 =

These are the Canadian number-one country songs of 1969, per the RPM Country Tracks chart.

Issue date	Title	Artist
January 13	Wichita Lineman	Glen Campbell
January 20	Wichita Lineman	Glen Campbell
January 27	I Take a Lot of Pride in What I Am	Merle Haggard
February 3	The Carroll County Accident	Porter Wagoner
February 10	The Carroll County Accident	Porter Wagoner
February 17	The Carroll County Accident	Porter Wagoner
February 24	Mr. Brown	Gary Buck
March 3	Daddy Sang Bass	Johnny Cash
March 10	The Girl Most Likely	Jeannie C. Riley
March 17	Mr. Brown	Gary Buck
March 24	Mr. Brown	Gary Buck
March 31	While Your Lover Sleeps	Leon Ashley
April 7	Kaw-Liga	Charley Pride
April 14	Kaw-Liga	Charley Pride
April 21	The Name of the Game Was Love	Hank Snow
April 28	Only the Lonely	Sonny James
May 5	Who's Gonna Mow Your Grass	Buck Owens
May 12	My Woman's Good to Me	David Houston
May 19	Galveston	Glen Campbell
May 26	Let It Be Me	Bobbie Gentry and Glen Campbell
June 2	It's a Sin	Marty Robbins
June 9	Who Drinks My Beer When I'm Gone	Mercey Brothers
June 16	Cajun Love	Lucille Starr
June 23	Ribbon of Darkness	Connie Smith
June 30	Singing My Song	Tammy Wynette
July 7	Rings of Gold	Dottie West and Don Gibson
July 14	Running Bear	Sonny James
July 21	The Days of Sand and Shovels	Waylon Jennings
July 28	One Has My Name (The Other Has My Heart)	Jerry Lee Lewis
August 2	Canadian Pacific	George Hamilton IV
August 9	Canadian Pacific	George Hamilton IV
August 16	Canadian Pacific	George Hamilton IV
August 23	A Boy Named Sue	Johnny Cash
August 30	A Boy Named Sue	Johnny Cash
September 6	A Boy Named Sue	Johnny Cash
September 13	A Boy Named Sue	Johnny Cash
September 20	True Grit	Glen Campbell
September 27	Workin' Man's Blues	Merle Haggard
October 4	Invitation to Your Party	Jerry Lee Lewis
October 11	Muddy Mississippi Line	Bobby Goldsboro
October 18	Tall Dark Stranger	Buck Owens
October 25	The Ways to Love a Man	Tammy Wynette
November 1	Invitation to Your Party	Jerry Lee Lewis
November 8	To See My Angel Cry	Conway Twitty
November 15	Get Rhythm	Johnny Cash
November 22	Get Rhythm	Johnny Cash
November 29	Groovy Grubworm	Harlow Wilcox
December 6	Try a Little Kindness	Glen Campbell
December 13	She Even Woke Me Up to Say Goodbye	Jerry Lee Lewis
December 20	Diggy Liggy Lo	Doug Kershaw
December 27	(I'm So) Afraid of Losing You Again	Charley Pride

== See also ==
- 1969 in music
- List of number-one country hits of 1969 (U.S.)
