= Billboard Top Country Singles of 1969 =

This is a list of Billboard magazine's ranking of the top country singles of 1969. "Daddy Sang Bass" by Johnny Cash was ranked as the year's No. 1 country single.

The ranking was based on performance on the Billboard Country Chart during the period from January 4, 1969, to August 30, 1969. Accordingly, the list excludes songs like "Okie from Muskogee", which held the No. 1 spot for four consecutive weeks from November 15 to December 6. And "A Boy Named Sue" ranks No. 83 on the list even though it held the No. 1 spot for five consecutive weeks from August 23 to September 20

Rank	Peak (Note: This column recites the record's peak position on Billboard's weekly charts.)	Title	Artist(s)	Label
1	1	"Daddy Sang Bass"	Johnny Cash	Columbia
2	1	"Only the Lonely"	Sonny James	Capitol
3	1	"My Life (Throw It Away If I Want To)"	Bill Anderson	Decca
4	1	"Statue of a Fool"	Jack Greene	Decca
5	1	"Running Bear"	Sonny James	Capitol
6	1	"Hungry Eyes"	Merle Haggard	Capitol
7	1	"I Love You More Today"	Conway Twitty	Decca
8	1	"Galveston"	Glen Campbell	Capitol
9	1	"Who's Gonna Mow Your Grass"	Buck Owens & His Buckaroos	Capitol
10	1	"Johnny B. Goode"	Buck Owens & His Buckaroos	Capitol
11	2	"I’ll Share My World with You"	George Jones	Musicor
12	1	"Singing My Song"	Tammy Wynette	Epic
13	4	"(Margie's At) The Lincoln Park Inn"	Bobby Bare	RCA
14	1	"Until My Dreams Come True"	Jack Greene	Decca
15	2	"Darling You Know I Wouldn't Lie"	Conway Twitty	Decca
16	1	"Woman of the World (Leave My World Alone)"	Loretta Lynn	Decca
17	2	"Rings of Gold"	Dottie West and Don Gibson	RCA
18	3	"Good Time Charlie's"	Del Reeves	United Artists
19	3	"Kaw-Liga"	Charley Pride	RCA
20	2	"Games People Play"	Freddy Weller	Columbia
21	1	"To Make Love Sweeter For You"	Jerry Lee Lewis	Smash
22	2	"One Has My Name (The Other Has My Heart)"	Jerry Lee Lewis	Smash
23	4	"My Woman's Good to Me"	David Houston	Epic
24	3	"Cajun Baby"	Hank Williams, Jr.	M-G-M
25	2	"The Carroll County Accident"	Porter Wagoner	RCA
26	5	"Be Glad"	Del Reeves	United Artists
27	6	"Leave My Dream Alone"	Warner Mack	Decca
28	10	"Who's Julie"	Mel Tillis	Kapp
29	1	"All I Have to Offer You Is Me"	Charley Pride	RCA
30	7	"You Gave Me a Mountain"	Johnny Bush	Stop
31	10	"Where the Blue and Lonely Go"	Roy Drusky	Mercury
32	9	"Kay"	John Wesley Ryles	Columbia
33	16	"The Name of the Game Was Love"	Hank Snow	RCA
34	5	"It's a Sin"	Marty Robbins	Columbia
35	9	"Yours Love"	Porter Wagoner and Dolly Parton	RCA
36	8	"None of My Business"	Henson Cargill	Monument
37	2	"When the Grass Grows Over Me"	George Jones	Musicor
38	12	"Just Hold My Hand"	Johnny & Jonie Mosby	RCA
39	15	"Old Faithful"	Mel Tillis	Kapp
40	4	"Mr. Walker It's All Over"	Billie Jo Spears	Capitol
41	9	"All for the Love of a Girl"	Claude King	Columbia
42	6	"When Two Worlds Collide"	Jim Reeves	RCA
43	5	"There Never Was a Time"	Jeannie C. Riley	Plantation
44	13	"Ribbon of Darkness"	Connie Smith	RCA
45	3	"Big Wind"	Porter Wagoner	RCA
46	11	"California Girl (And the Tennessee Square)"	Tompall & the Glaser Brothers	M-G-M
47	11	"Sweetheart of the Year"	Ray Price	Columbia
48	4	"The Ballad of Forty Dollars"	Tom T. Hall	Mercury
49	6	"The Girl Most Likely"	Jeannie C. Riley	Plantation
50	12	"One More Mile"	Dave Dudley	Mercury
60	18	"Our House Is Not a Home (For It's Never Been Loved In)"	Lynn Anderson	Chart
71	1	"Stand by Your Man"	Tammy Wynette	Epic
72	3	"I Take a Lot of Pride in What I Am"	Merle Haggard	Capitol
77	19	"Something's Wrong in California"	Waylon Jennings	RCA
83	1	"A Boy Named Sue"	Johnny Cash	Columbia
85	1	"Wichita Lineman"	Glen Campbell	Capitol

== See also ==
- List of Hot Country Singles number ones of 1969
- List of Billboard Hot 100 number ones of 1969
- 1969 in country music
