= List of Hot Country Singles number ones of 1969 =

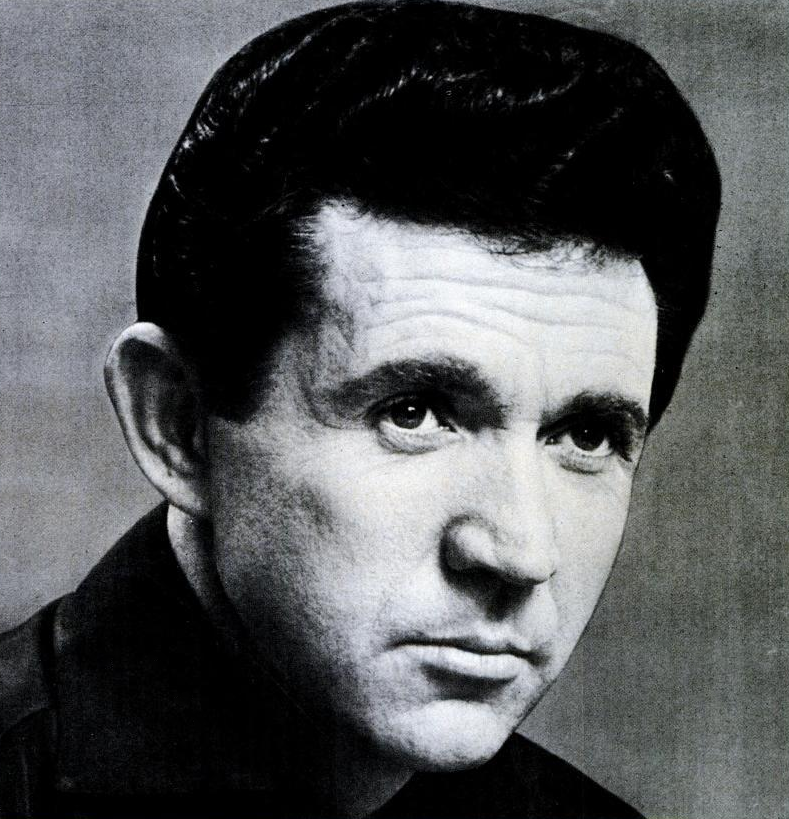
Sonny James had three number ones in 1969.

Hot Country Songs is a chart that ranks the top-performing country music songs in the United States, published by Billboard magazine. In 1969, 23 different singles topped the chart, which was published at the time under the title Hot Country Singles, in 52 weekly issues of the magazine. Chart placings were based on playlists submitted by country music radio stations and sales reports submitted by stores.

In the issue of Billboard dated January 4, Johnny Cash's single "Daddy Sang Bass" climbed from number 19 to the top spot, replacing "Wichita Lineman" by Glen Campbell. Cash's single remained at number one for six weeks, the longest unbroken run of the year. The singer returned to the top of the chart later in the year with "A Boy Named Sue", which spent five weeks at number one. His cumulative total of eleven weeks atop the chart was the highest by any artist in 1969. Merle Haggard, Sonny James and Buck Owens each reached number one with three different singles, the most by any act. All three of James' chart-toppers were cover versions of successful rock and roll and pop songs from the late 1950s and early 1960s; the singer achieved the majority of his more than 20 country number ones with versions of pop songs. Owens also took a country reworking of a rock and roll classic to the top spot, with a live version of Chuck Berry's 1958 song "Johnny B. Goode". Haggard's three chart-toppers included "Okie from Muskogee", one of the best-known songs of his career.

In March, Jerry Lee Lewis, regarded as a legend of the rock and roll genre, topped the chart with "To Make Love Sweeter For You". In doing so he achieved a country number one for the first time since Billboard combined sales and airplay into a single chart in 1958; his last country chart-topper had been on the C&W Best Sellers in Stores chart earlier in that year. Lewis had gained some success on the country charts in the 1950s with songs such as "Great Balls of Fire" in the rockabilly style which incorporated elements of country and rock and roll. In 1968, however, after a decade with little success, he mounted a surprise comeback when he concentrated fully on the country genre, and would go on to achieve a succession of country chart entries into the 1970s. Charley Pride had his first chart-topper in August 1969 with "All I Have to Offer You (Is Me)", and he quickly returned to the number one position with "(I'm So) Afraid of Losing You Again", which was the final number one of the year and thus of the decade. The first African-American performer to become a superstar in the country music genre, Pride would go on to achieve more than thirty number one singles on the Hot Country chart.

== Chart history ==
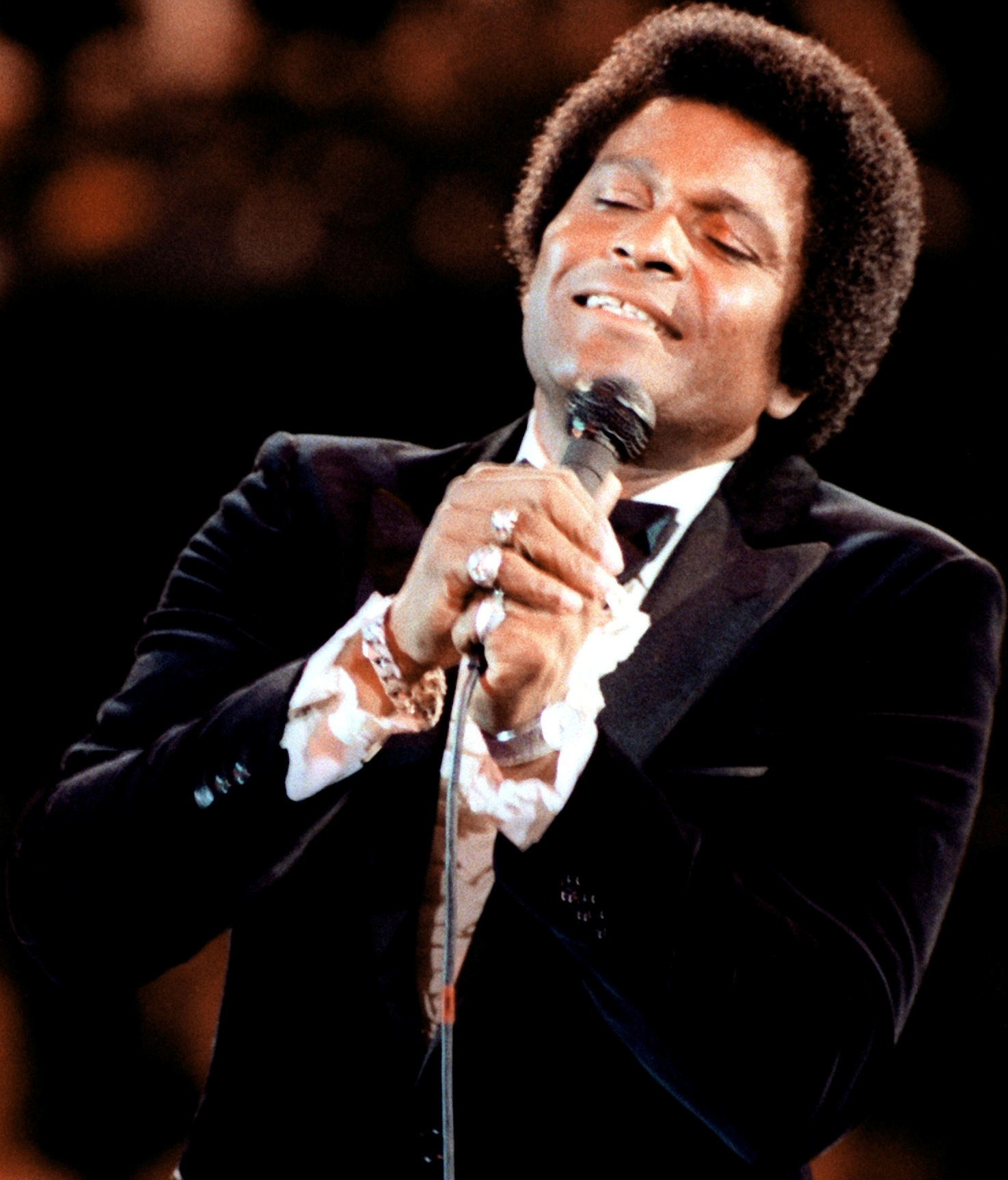
Charley Pride had his first number one in 1969.

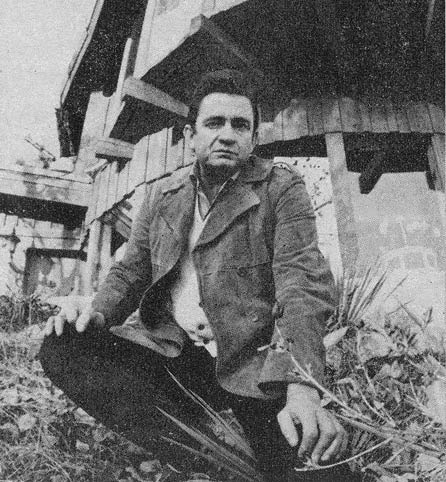
Johnny Cash spent eleven weeks at the top of the chart in 1969, the most by any artist.

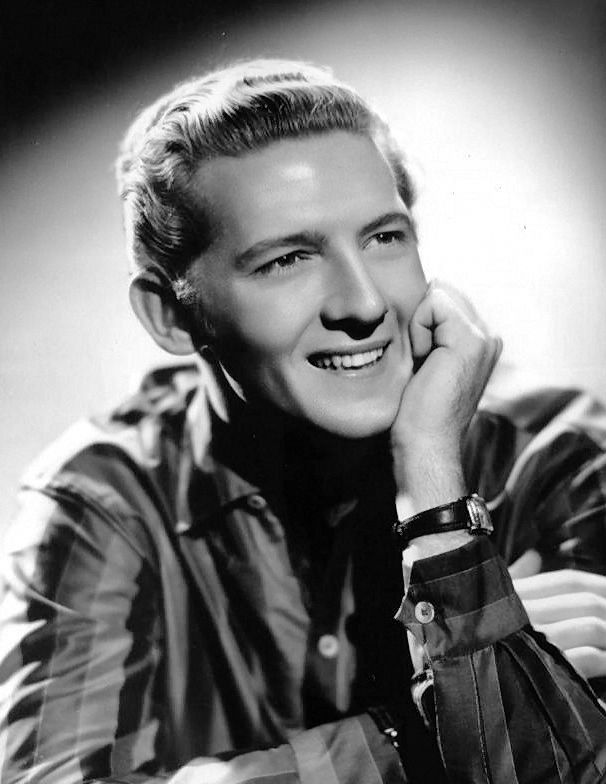
Veteran rock and roll star Jerry Lee Lewis reached the top spot in the spring. He had begun a move into country music the previous year and went on to achieve a run of success within the genre.

Issue date	Title	Artist(s)	Ref.
January 4	"Daddy Sang Bass"	Johnny Cash	
January 11	"Daddy Sang Bass"	Johnny Cash	
January 18	"Daddy Sang Bass"	Johnny Cash	
January 25	"Daddy Sang Bass"	Johnny Cash	
February 1	"Daddy Sang Bass"	Johnny Cash	
February 8	"Daddy Sang Bass"	Johnny Cash	
February 15	"Until My Dreams Come True"	Jack Greene	
February 22	"Until My Dreams Come True"	Jack Greene	
March 1	"To Make Love Sweeter For You"	Jerry Lee Lewis	
March 8	"Only the Lonely"	Sonny James	
March 15	"Only the Lonely"	Sonny James	
March 22	"Only the Lonely"	Sonny James	
March 29	"Who's Gonna Mow Your Grass"	Buck Owens and his Buckaroos	
April 5	"Who's Gonna Mow Your Grass"	Buck Owens and his Buckaroos	
April 12	"Woman of the World (Leave My World Alone)"	Loretta Lynn	
April 19	"Galveston"	Glen Campbell	
April 26	"Galveston"	Glen Campbell	
May 3	"Galveston"	Glen Campbell	
May 10	"Hungry Eyes"	Merle Haggard	
May 17	"My Life (Throw It Away If I Want To)"	Bill Anderson	
May 24	"My Life (Throw It Away If I Want To)"	Bill Anderson	
May 31	"Singing My Song"	Tammy Wynette	
June 7	"Singing My Song"	Tammy Wynette	
June 14	"Running Bear"	Sonny James	
June 21	"Running Bear"	Sonny James	
June 28	"Running Bear"	Sonny James	
July 5	"Statue of a Fool"	Jack Greene	
July 12	"Statue of a Fool"	Jack Greene	
July 19	"I Love You More Today"	Conway Twitty	
July 26	"Johnny B. Goode"	Buck Owens and his Buckaroos	
August 2	"Johnny B. Goode"	Buck Owens and his Buckaroos	
August 9	"All I Have to Offer You (Is Me)"	Charley Pride	
August 16	"Workin' Man Blues"	Merle Haggard	
August 23	"A Boy Named Sue"	Johnny Cash	
August 30	"A Boy Named Sue"	Johnny Cash	
September 6	"A Boy Named Sue"	Johnny Cash	
September 13	"A Boy Named Sue"	Johnny Cash	
September 20	"A Boy Named Sue"	Johnny Cash	
September 27	"Tall Dark Stranger"	Buck Owens	
October 4	"Since I Met You, Baby"	Sonny James	
October 11	"Since I Met You, Baby"	Sonny James	
October 18	"Since I Met You, Baby"	Sonny James	
October 25	"The Ways to Love a Man"	Tammy Wynette	
November 1	"The Ways to Love a Man"	Tammy Wynette	
November 8	"To See My Angel Cry"	Conway Twitty	
November 15	"Okie from Muskogee"	Merle Haggard	
November 22	"Okie from Muskogee"	Merle Haggard	
November 29	"Okie from Muskogee"	Merle Haggard	
December 6	"Okie from Muskogee"	Merle Haggard	
December 13	"(I'm So) Afraid of Losing You Again"	Charley Pride	
December 20	"(I'm So) Afraid of Losing You Again"	Charley Pride	
December 27	"(I'm So) Afraid of Losing You Again"	Charley Pride	

== See also ==
- 1969 in music
- 1969 in country music
- List of artists who reached number one on the U.S. country chart
