= Wild Weekend =

Wild Weekend may refer to:

- Wild Weekend (instrumental), a 1962 instrumental performed by The Rockin' Rebels
- Having A Wild Weekend, a 1965 album by the Dave Clark Five, and its title track of the same name
- Wild Week-End, a 1968 song by Bill Anderson
- Wild Weekend (Bill Anderson album), 1968
- Wild Weekend (NRBQ album), 1989
