= The Ways to Love a Man =

The Ways to Love a Man may refer to:

- The Ways to Love a Man (song), a 1969 single by Tammy Wynette
- The Ways to Love a Man (album), a 1970 album by Tammy Wynette
