= JayDee Maness =

American musician (born 1945)

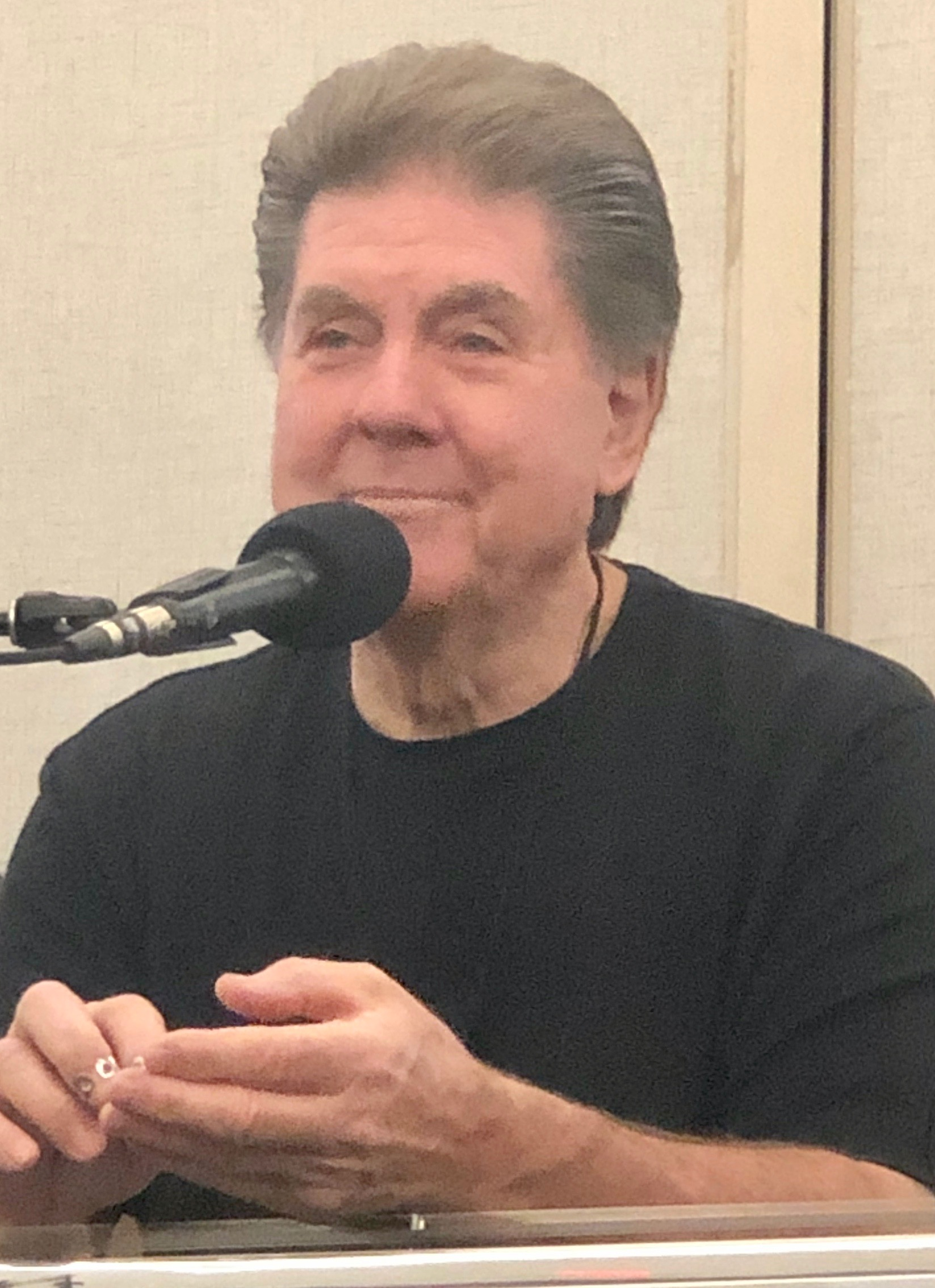
- JayDee Maness, 2021

Background information
- Born: 4 January 1945 (age 81); Loma Linda, California, U.S.
- Genres: Country, country rock, folk rock, Americana
- Occupation: Steel guitarist
- Instruments: pedal steel guitar, lap steel guitar
- Years active: 1962–present
- Website: jaydeemaness.com

JayDee Maness (born January 4, 1945) is an American pedal steel guitarist who is a veteran session musician in Los Angeles. He is known for his work with Gram Parsons, the Byrds, Buck Owens and the Buckaroos, Ray Stevens, Eric Clapton, the Desert Rose Band and Vince Gill. Maness received The Academy of Country Music's "Steel Guitarist of the Year" award 18 times and was inducted into the Steel Guitar Hall of Fame in 2003.

== Early life ==
Maness was born in Loma Linda, California, in 1945 and grew up in nearby Riverside. His father wanted him to play steel guitar and bought him a six-string Magnetone electric steel guitar with amplifier at a price of $30. He began playing at age 10. At first, he did not know how to tune the instrument properly and used an E chord like a traditional guitar. He did not have finger picks and played for a year just using his fingers. He later took some lessons and emerged with a working knowledge of the instrument. His father played rhythm guitar and, with two more musicians, got a job playing with thirteen year-old JayDee at an American Legion Hall.

After high school, he married and began working at a pest control firm in the citrus orchards of San Bernardino County. After four years he decided to pursue a career in music and made the switch from lap steel to pedal steel. His experimentation with the knee levers on the pedal instrument resulted in positioning them contrary to accepted practice. He received his first break into recording session work after Cliffie Stone heard him play and asked him to come to a demo session. Maness was introduced to Jimmy Bryant whom he credits for instructing him "when not to play, when to play and in general how to record". He later moved to Los Angeles, was employed as a musician at the Palomino Club. His skills were recognized, and he entered into the inner circle of elite session musicians in Los Angeles.

== 1960s session work ==
On the California folk and country scene of the early 1960s, he played with a number of local acts, including Eddy Drake, Gene Davis and Norm Forrest, and found work as an in-demand session musician in the Los Angeles area. In the summer and autumn of 1967, he was one of the three session musicians that recorded with Gram Parsons' short-lived International Submarine Band. He first recorded with the band on a pair of singles ("Luxury Liner" and "Blue Eyes") before contributing to the group's sole album, Safe at Home. According to music writer Mark Deming, this album was one of the first rock albums to have a distinct country influence.

After the demise of the International Submarine Band, Maness joined the Byrds in the studio in early 1968 and played on their seminal Sweetheart of the Rodeo album, contributing pedal steel guitar on four of the album's 11 tracks: "The Christian Life", "You Don’t Miss Your Water", "You're Still on My Mind", and "Life in Prison" (session musician Lloyd Green played pedal steel on four other tracks that were recorded in Nashville). Maness toured with the Byrds in California while the album was in post-production but with the departure of Parsons in August, 1968, Maness' tenure with the Byrds ended.

Maness next played with Buck Owens, for about 18 months. During this time the band had two No. 1 songs on the Billboard country music charts in 1969 ("Who's Gonna Mow Your Grass" and "Tall Dark Stranger") and recorded two live albums (Buck Owens in London "Live" and Buck Owens "Live" in Scandinavia).

== The 1970s and 1980s ==
In 1970 Maness joined Tony Booth, who was then leading the house band at L.A.'s Palomino Club. He recorded with Booth on several of his early '70s Capitol albums, including The Key's in the Mailbox and Lonesome 7-7203.

Manness' reputation as a session player led to recording or touring with Barbra Streisand, Vince Gill, Michael Nesmith, Ray Price and others. According to musician Ray Stevens, one of Maness's most recognizable pedal steel solos occurred during a 1975 recording of Erroll Garner and Johnny Burke's "Misty", while jamming in the studio with fellow musicians, which Stevens describes as "an accident ... one of life's little bonuses." The track, which was recorded in two takes, and featured Maness's 20-second solo, won a Grammy Award for best arrangement of 1975 and became the title track of Stevens' Misty album of the same year.

== The Desert Rose Band, Eric Clapton, and other work ==
In 1985, Maness became one of the founding members of the Desert Rose Band, a country-rock group, with fellow ex-Byrd Chris Hillman, John Jorgenson, Herb Pedersen, Steve Duncan and Bill Bryson. He left the band in 1990, but returned to it in 1998 and has remained part of the line-up since then.

Maness's acclaimed bridge solo on Eric Clapton's 1992 hit "Tears in Heaven" was, according to the musician, another piece of recording luck that came out of the blue for him:

"Eric Clapton is another long story. I went to the studio [in 1991], got all my stuff loaded in, got inside and somebody told me 'Eric isn't feeling well and isn't going to show up today. Can you come back tomorrow?' So tomorrow comes, and Eric is there, feeling better. We took all day to do that one song. When he finally got the take that he wanted, I thought I was finished - I was unloading and putting stuff away. Eric says 'Wait, wait, I want you to do the solo on this record,' and we stayed, just the two of us, and finished. And the rest is history! It really became a good record for him. And I got a platinum record of that one on my wall, Eric signed it and gave it to me."

In 2018, Maness reunited with Lloyd Green on the 50th anniversary of Sweetheart of the Rodeo to record Journey to the Beginning: A Steel Guitar Tribute to the Byrds at Cinderella Sound in Nashville for Coastal Bend Music. The album is an instrumental tribute to Sweetheart of the Rodeo, and features a vocal of "You Ain't Goin' Nowhere" featuring guest vocalists Jeff Hanna, Herb Pedersen, Richie Furay, and Jim Lauderdale.

== Awards ==
Maness has won the ACM award for steel guitar on 18 occasions (1970, 1971, 1974–76, 1980 (tied with Buddy Emmons), 1982, 1983, 1986–90, 1992, 1993, 1997, 1999, 2002).
