= The Ways to Love a Man (album) =

Studio album by Tammy Wynette
- Released: January 26, 1970
- Recorded: January – November 1969
- Studios: Columbia Studio B (Nashville, Tennessee)
- Genres: Country; Nashville Sound
- Label: Epic
- Producer: Billy Sherrill

Tammy Wynette chronology
Inspiration (1969)	The Ways to Love a Man (1970)	Tammy's Touch (1970)

Singles from The Ways to Love a Man
- 1. "The Ways to Love a Man" Released: August 1, 1969

The Ways to Love a Man is a studio album by American country artist, Tammy Wynette. It was released on January 26, 1970, via Epic Records and was the seventh studio album in Wynette's career. The disc consisted of 11 tracks which included both original material and cover recordings. Its title track was the album's only single included. It became a number one song on the North American country charts while also reaching chart positions in other musical genres as well. The album itself also reached chart positions on the country albums chart following its release. Critics and journalists gave the album a positive reception in the years that followed.

== Background ==
Tammy Wynette had reached her peak commercial success during the late sixties decade. She had a string of number one singles that topped the country charts, including "I Don't Wanna Play House", "Take Me to Your World" and "D-I-V-O-R-C-E". Her signature tune, "Stand by Your Man", described the way housewives accept their husband's behavior. The song's production and story line would be echoed in Wynette's follow-up releases over the next several years, which included the 1969 song, "The Ways to Love a Man". Penned by Billy Sherrill, Glenn Sutton and Wynette herself, the song describes how a housewife will use her "female psyche" to keep her husband happy. The song would inspire the title of Wynette's next studio album.

== Recording and content ==
The Ways to Love a Man was produced by Billy Sherrill in sessions conducted at Columbia Studio B, located in Nashville, Tennessee. The recording sessions took place between January and November 1969. The album contained a total of 11 tracks. The disc included three covers of previously recorded songs. Among these was the Johnny Mathis pop song, "The Twelfth of Never". Another cover was Wynette's version of George Jones's "I'll Share My World with You". Jones's version originally was a number two country song in 1969. Wynette also recorded Margie Singleton's "Enough of a Woman". Singleton would later release her own version of her composition as a single in 1971.

The album's remaining songs were new recordings. Along with the title track, "Singing My Song" was also co-written by Sherrill, Sutton and Wynette. According to Glenn Sutton, Wynette did not contribute anything to the song's composition but theorized that perhaps she did not like the song and figured including her writing credit would make her like it more. Sutton (along with Billy Sherrill) also wrote the track "Where Could You Go (But to Her)". Sherill solely wrote the final album track, "Still Around", while co-composing "He'll Never Take the Place of You" with Bob Johnston and Charlie Daniels". Wynette and husband, George Jones, co-wrote the tracks "I Know" and "These Two". The pair had married during this period and would eventually record as a duet team.

== Critical reception ==
Professional ratings
Review scores
Source	Rating
Allmusic	4/5 stars

The disc received a positive response from critics and journalists. Stephen Thomas Erlewine of AllMusic rated The Ways to Love a Man four out of five stars. Erlewine compared the album's production and songs to that of Stand by Your Man, noting that it had followed the same formula. Erlewine also commented that the album's production was more pop-influenced than that of its predecessor. Erlewine concluded by saying, "This sustained mood is appealing, even seductive, but the album is just a shade less compelling overall than its immediate predecessor...but that is a pretty tough yardstick to judge any country album, really." David Cantwell of Rolling Stone reviewed the album in his 2020 piece that highlighted "12 Classic Country Albums Turning 20 in 2020". Cantwell praised the versatility of Wynette's vocal delivery: "Tammy could sustain power and complexity, whether whispering in your ear or shoving you up against a wall of sound."

== Release, chart performance and singles ==
The Ways to Love a Man was released on January 26, 1970, on Epic Records. It marked the seventh studio album released in Wynette's career. It was originally offered as a vinyl LP, containing five songs on Side A and six songs on Side B. A similar version was also released during this time as a cassette. On the American Billboard 200 albums chart, it peaked at number 83 in 1970. By June 1970, the album had reached the number three positions on the Billboard Top Country Albums chart. Its title track was the album's lead single and was originally released by Epic on August 1, 1969. By October 1969, the single topped the Billboard Hot Country Songs chart and Canada's RPM country chart. It also reached number 81 on the Billboard Hot 100 and number 18 on the Billboard adult contemporary charts. "Singing My Song" was also a single but first included on Wynette's 1969 compilation, Tammy's Greatest Hits.

== Track listing ==
Side one
No.	Title	Writer(s)	Length
1.	"The Ways to Love a Man"	Billy Sherrill; Glenn Sutton; Tammy Wynette	2:27
2.	"The Twelfth of Never"	Jerry Livingston; Paul Francis Webster	2:26
3.	"I'll Share My World with You"	Ben Wilson	2:40
4.	"Enough of a Woman"	Leon Ashley; Margie Singleton	2:05
5.	"Singing My Song"	Sherrill; Sutton; Wynette	2:22

Side two
No.	Title	Writer(s)	Length
1.	"He'll Never Take the Place of You"	Charlie Daniels; Bob Johnston; Sherrill	2:49
2.	"I Know"	George Jones; Wynette	2:28
3.	"Yearning (To Kiss You)"	Eddings; Jones	2:18
4.	"These Two"	Jones; Wynette	2:22
5.	"Where Could You Go (But to Her)"	Sherrill; Sutton	3:01
6.	"Still Around"	Sherrill	2:47

== Technical personnel ==
All credits are adapted from the original liner notes of The Ways to Love a Man.

- Bill Grine – Photography
- Billy Sherrill – Producer
- New World Photography – Photography

== Chart performance ==
Chart (1970)	Peak position
US Billboard 200	83
US Top Country Albums (Billboard)	3

== Release history ==
Region	Date	Format	Label	Ref.
North America	January 26, 1970	Vinyl; cassette	Epic Records	
United Kingdom	January 26, 1970	Vinyl	CBS Records International	
North America	2010s	Music download; streaming	Sony Music Entertainment	
