= She Still Comes Around (To Love What's Left of Me) =

Single by Jerry Lee Lewis

from the album She Still Comes Around
- B-side: "Slipping Around"
- Released: September 1968
- Genre: Country
- Length: 2:26
- Label: Smash
- Songwriter(s): Glenn Sutton
- Producer(s): Jerry Kennedy

Jerry Lee Lewis singles chronology
"What's Made Milwaukee Famous (Has Made a Loser Out of Me)" (1968)	"She Still Comes Around (To Love What's Left of Me)" (1968)	"To Make Love Sweeter for You" (1969)

"She Still Comes Around (To Love What's Left of Me)" is a song written by Glenn Sutton and performed by Jerry Lee Lewis. It was released in September 1968 as the lead single from the album, She Still Comes Around. The song peaked at number 2 on both the U.S. Billboard Hot Country Singles chart and the Canadian RPM Country Tracks chart.

== Chart performance ==
Chart (1968)	Peak position
U.S. Billboard Hot Country Singles	2
Canadian RPM Country Tracks	2
