= Say, Has Anybody Seen My Sweet Gypsy Rose (album) =

Studio album by Terry Stafford
- Released: October 1973
- Recorded: Jack Clement Recording Studios, Nashville, Tennessee; Pete's Place, Nashville, Tennessee
- Genres: Country, Country pop
- Length: 35:28
- Label: Atlantic
- Producer: Earl Poole Ball

Terry Stafford chronology
Suspicion! (1966)	Say, Has Anybody Seen My Sweet Gypsy Rose (1973)

Singles from Say, Has Anybody Seen My Sweet Gypsy Rose
- 1. "Say, Has Anybody Seen My Sweet Gypsy Rose" Released: August 1973; 2. "Amarillo by Morning" Released: November 1973; 3. "Captured" Released: March 1974

Say, Has Anybody Seen My Sweet Gypsy Rose is the second studio album by American singer-songwriter Terry Stafford. It was released on October 1973 via Atlantic Records. It is his only studio album marketed towards country music. The album includes the top 40 country hits: the title track, "Amarillo by Morning", and "Captured".

== Critical reception ==
Billboard gave the album a review saying "It's an unusually powerful selection of material."

== Track listing ==
No.	Title	Writer(s)	Length
1.	"Country Canary"	Terry Stafford	2:55
2.	"Big in Vegas"	Buck Owens, Stafford	3:35
3.	"Suspicion"	Doc Pomus, Mort Shuman	2:56
4.	"Ain't No Woman Like My Woman"	Rory Bourke, Gayle Barnhill	2:36
5.	"Shelly's Winter Love"	Merle Haggard	3:30
6.	"Amarillo by Morning"	Paul Fraser, Stafford	2:28
7.	"Say, Has Anybody Seen My Sweet Gypsy Rose"	Irwin Levine, L. Russell Brown	2:44
8.	"Let's Keep the Memories Warm"	Gene Price	3:13
9.	"Captured"	Eddie Rabbitt, Bourke	3:27
10.	"Easy to Say, Hard to Do"	Chuck Howard	2:03
11.	"Road House Country Singer"	Don Epperson, Stafford	3:36
12.	"It Sure Is Bad to Love Her"	Stafford	2:25

== Personnel ==
- Joe Allen - bass
- Tommy Allsup - guitar
- James Buchanan - fiddle, strings
- Jimmy Capps - guitar
- Jerry Carrigan - drums
- Pete Drake - steel guitar
- Steve Gibson - guitar
- Johnny Gimble - fiddle, strings
- Lloyd Green - steel guitar
- Shorty Lavender - fiddle & strings
- Kenny Malone - drums
- Charlie McCoy - organ, vibraphone, harpsichord
- Weldon Myrick - steel guitar
- The Nashville Edition - background vocals
- Ron Oates - piano
- Gary S. Paxton - guitar
- Gene Price - background vocals on "Country Canary"
- Leon Rhodes - guitar
- Pig Robbins - piano
- Billy Sanford - guitar
- Terry Stafford - lead vocals
- Henry Strzelecki - bass
- Reggie Young - guitar
