= I'll Share My World with You =

Studio album by George Jones
- Released: June 1969
- Genre: Country
- Length: 24:14
- Label: Musicor
- Producer: Pappy Daily

George Jones chronology
My Country (1968)	I'll Share My World with You (1969)	Where Grass Won't Grow (1969)

Singles from I'll Share My World with You
- 1. "Milwaukee, Here I Come" Released: August 17, 1968; 2. "When the Grass Grows Over Me" Released: October 10, 1968; 3. "I'll Share My World with You" Released: March 4, 1969

Professional ratings
Review scores
Source	Rating
Allmusic	3/5 stars

I'll Share My World with You is an album by American country music artist George Jones. This album was released in 1969 (see 1969 in country music) on the Musicor Records label. Tammy Wynette, who married Jones that year, is pictured on the cover.

I'll Share My World With You would reach number 5 on the Country Albums chart.

== Track listing ==
No.	Title	Writer(s)	Length
1.	"I'll Share My World with You"	Ben Wilson	2:28
2.	"I Don’t Have Sense Enough (To Come In Out of the Pain"	Billy J Smith	2:21
3.	"Do What You Think's Best"	Jimmy Peppers	1:59
4.	"Heartaches and Hangovers"	Joseph Robertson, Dave Sullivan	2:11
5.	"Milwaukee, Here I Come" (with Brenda Carter)"	Lee Fykes	2:34
6.	"When the Grass Grows Over Me"	Don Chapel	2:52
7.	"You've Become My Everything"	Charlie Carter	2:37
8.	"When the Wife Runs Off"	Earl Montgomery	2:25
9.	"Our Happy Home"	Roy Acuff	2:18
10.	"The Race Is On"	Don Rollins	2:03

== Chart Performance ==
=== Weekly charts ===
Chart (1969)	Peak position
U.S. Billboard Top Country Albums	5
U.S. Billboard 200	185

=== Year-end charts ===
Chart (1969)	Position
US Top Country Albums (Billboard)	47

=== Singles ===
Year	Single	Peak chart positions	
Year	Single	US Country	CAN Country
1968	Milwaukee, Here I Come	12	—
1968	When the Grass Grows Over Me	2	2
1969	I'll Share My World with You	2	2
