= The Bill Anderson Story: His Greatest Hits =

Compilation album by Bill Anderson
- Released: March 1969
- Recorded: 1958–1968
- Genre: Country; Nashville Sound
- Label: Decca
- Producer: Owen Bradley

Bill Anderson chronology
Happy State of Mind (1968)	The Bill Anderson Story: His Greatest Hits (1969)	My Life/But You Know I Love You (1969)

The Bill Anderson Story: His Greatest Hits is a compilation album by American country singer-songwriter Bill Anderson. It was released in March 1969 and was produced by Owen Bradley. The Bill Anderson Story was a double compilation album that contained his singles released on the Decca label up to that point. It featured many recordings Anderson had issued over the last decade, including several number one hits and top ten hits.

== Background and content ==
The Bill Anderson Story: His Greatest Hits was a double album of Anderson's singles previously released (and recorded) between 1958 and 1968. The sessions for these songs were all produced by Owen Bradley. Bradley was Anderson's longtime producer at the Decca label and was responsible for producing his biggest hits. Between both records, the album contained a total of 24 tracks. Most of these tracks were composed by Anderson as well. It featured songs ranging from his earliest recordings, such as "That's What It's Like to Be Lonesome."

Also included were his number one hits up to that point: "Mama Sang a Song," "Still" and "I Get the Fever." In addition, The Bill Anderson Story featured songs Anderson had composed for other artists, but also recorded himself. Examples of this included his version of "Once a Day," which was a hit for Connie Smith. Another example is "City Lights," a song recorded by Ray Price that helped establish Anderson with his own recording contract. His number one duet single with Jan Howard is also featured on the album, "For Loving You."

== Release and reception ==
Professional ratings
Review scores
Source	Rating
Allmusic	4.5/5 stars

The Bill Anderson Story: His Greatest Hits was released first in March 1969 on Decca Records. It was the fifth compilation release of his career and first double-length album. It was originally issued as a vinyl LP, containing six songs on both sides of each record. This totaled to 24 songs. It was reissued twice more in the United States, twice by MCA Records. The album peaked at number 43 on the Billboard Top Country Albums chart in 1969, becoming his third compilation to reach the chart. In later years, it was reviewed positively by Thom Owens of Allmusic, who rated it 4.5 out of 5 stars. "Several hits are missing, yet The Bill Anderson Story offers an effective introduction to the popular vocalist's easy-going, muted style," Owens commented.

== Track listing ==
All songs composed by Bill Anderson, except where noted.

=== Record one ===
Side one
No.	Title	Writer(s)	Length
1.	"Bright Lights and Country Music"	Bill Anderson; Jimmy Gateley	2:35
2.	"No One's Gonna Hurt You Anymore"	Ted Cooper; Steve Karliski	2:25
3.	"I Get the Fever"		2:06
4.	"Mama Sang a Song"		3:27
5.	"I Love You Drops"		2:45
6.	"The Tip of My Fingers"		2:29

Side two
No.	Title	Writer(s)	Length
1.	"Still"		2:45
2.	"Easy Come – Easy Go"		2:03
3.	"Once a Day"		2:35
4.	"I Can Do Nothing Alone"		2:50
5.	"Cincinnati, Ohio"		2:08
6.	"Golden Guitar"	Billy Gray; Curtis Leach	4:08

=== Record two ===
Side one
No.	Title	Length
1.	"Wild Week-End"	2:22
2.	"Think I'll Go Somewhere and Cry Myself to Sleep"	2:39
3.	"Ninety-Nine"	2:28
4.	"Papa"	2:33
5.	"Happiness"	2:12
6.	"Five Little Fingers"	3:00

Side two
No.	Title	Writer(s)	Length
1.	"Po' Folks"		2:50
2.	"City Lights"		3:00
3.	"Get While the Gettin's Good"		2:32
4.	"8×10"		2:48
5.	"That's What It's Like to Be Lonesome"		2:30
6.	"For Loving You" (with Jan Howard)	Karliski; Rossini Pinto	2:43

== Personnel ==
All credits are adapted from the liner notes of The Bill Anderson Story.

- Bill Anderson – lead vocals
- Owen Bradley – record producer

== Chart performance ==
Chart (1969)	Peak position
US Top Country Albums (Billboard)	43

== Release history ==
Region	Date	Format	Label	Ref.
United States	March 1969	Vinyl	Decca	
United States	1973	Vinyl	MCA	
United Kingdom	1974	Vinyl	MCA	
United States	1979	Vinyl	MCA	
United States	1980	Vinyl	MCA	
