= Terry Sumsion =

Canadian singer

Terry Sumsion (February 7, 1947 – March 26, 2011) was a Canadian country singer. He received a Juno Award nomination for Country Male Vocalist of the Year at the Juno Awards of 1985.

== Career ==
Born and raised in Burford, Ontario, Sumsion launched his musical career in 1970 with the band The Moonlighters. He recorded his debut single, "Our Lovin' Place", in 1981, and after winning a contest sponsored by London radio station CJBX-FM, he used his winnings to finance the recording of a full-length album. In addition to his Juno Award nomination, he received Canadian Country Music Award nominations in 1983, with Our Lovin' Place nominated for Album of the Year and its title track nominated for Single of the Year, and in 1985, with Midnight Invitation nominated for Album of the Year and its title track nominated for Single of the Year.

Over the course of his career he released 12 albums, and his singles included "When You Leave That Way", "There Go I", "So Hard to Forget", "Brand New Love Affair", "One More Time", "Shenandoah", "Born Again", "That's When You Know it's Over", "Crazy Love Games" and "Too Bad We're Only Friends".

Late in his career, he was diagnosed with esophageal cancer in 2007, but resumed performing after undergoing treatment.

Following his death in 2011, a tribute show was staged in Thorndale, with a bill that included Marie Bottrell and Larry Mercey. The Terry Sumsion Musical Scholarship Fund was created in his memory.

== Discography ==
- Our Lovin' Place (1983)
- Midnight Invitation (1984)
- New Directions (1987)
- Ride the Storm (1992)
- Authentic Country (1995)
- White Christmas (1995)
- It's Time (2001)
- Batteries Not Included (2005)
- T.S. (2006)
- New Roots (2007)
- This One's for the Fans (2010)
- Encore (2011)
