= Happy State of Mind (album) =

Studio album by Bill Anderson
- Released: September 1968
- Recorded: August 1968
- Studios: Bradley's Barn, Mount Juliet, Tennessee
- Genres: Country; Nashville Sound
- Label: Decca
- Producer: Owen Bradley

Bill Anderson chronology
| Wild Weekend (1968) | Happy State of Mind (1968) | The Bill Anderson Story: His Greatest Hits (1969) |

Singles from Happy State of Mind
- 1. "Happy State of Mind" Released: July 1968

Happy State of Mind is a studio album by American country singer-songwriter Bill Anderson. It was released in September 1968 on Decca Records and was produced by Owen Bradley. Anderson's tenth studio recording, it was also his second studio album released in 1968. Among the songs included on the release was the title track, which became a major hit in both the United States and Canada.

== Background and content ==
Happy State of Mind was recorded in August 1968 at Bradley's Barn studio in Mount Juliet, Tennessee. The sessions were supervised by the studio's owner, Owen Bradley, Anderson's long time producer. The record's production marked Anderson's tenth studio album to be recorded. The album contained 11 tracks. Six of the album's tracks were composed by Anderson, including the title track. Happy State of Mind also included cover versions of songs previously recorded by other performers. The third track on side two of the record was a cover of Merle Haggard's "Today I Started Loving You Again". "Did She Mention My Name" was previously written and recorded by Canadian folk artist Gordon Lightfoot. Another album track, "The Unicorn" was first cut by The Irish Rovers. Although not a cover, "I Still Believe in Love", would later be recorded by Jan Howard in 1969 and released as a single.

== Release and reception ==
Happy State of Mind was released in September 1968 on Decca Records. It was issued as a vinyl record, with five songs on side one and six songs on side two. The album peaked at number 24 on the Billboard Top Country Albums chart in November 1968 after spending 11 weeks on the list. The record's title track was the only single issued. It was released in July 1968 and peaked at number two on the Billboard Hot Country Songs chart in October 1968. The single also became his first to chart on the RPM Country Songs chart in Canada, where it reached number one. The album would later be reviewed from Allmusic who gave it 2.5 out of 5 possible stars.

== Track listing ==
All tracks written by Bill Anderson, except where noted.

Side one
| No. | Title | Writer(s) | Length |
|---|---|---|---|
| 1. | "Happy State of Mind" | | 2:25 |
| 2. | "I Still Believe in Love" | | 2:45 |
| 3. | "Just for You" | Larry Butler; Curly Putman | 2:10 |
| 4. | "Love Takes Care of Me" | Jimmy Peppers | 2:00 |
| 5. | "Time's Been Good to Me" | | 2:21 |

Side two
| No. | Title | Writer(s) | Length |
|---|---|---|---|
| 1. | "Did She Mention My Name" | Gordon Lightfoot | 2:31 |
| 2. | "The Unicorn" | Shel Silverstein | 3:15 |
| 3. | "Today I Started Loving You Again" | Merle Haggard; Bonnie Owens | 2:15 |
| 4. | "Tomorrow's Gonna Be Better Than Today" | | 2:16 |
| 5. | "Part of My Heart (Will Always Be Yours)" | | 2:35 |
| 6. | "It Just Don't Take Me Long to Say Goodbye" | | 2:08 |

== Personnel ==
All credits are adapted from the liner notes of Happy State of Mind.

Musical personnel

- Bill Anderson – lead vocals
- Harold Bradley – guitar
- Ray Edenton – guitar
- Roy Huskey – bass
- The Jordanaires – background vocals
- Jimmy Lance – guitar
- Grady Martin – guitar
- Len Miller – drums
- Hal Rugg – steel guitar
- Jerry Smith – piano

Technical personnel

- Owen Bradley – record producer
- Hal Buksbaum – photography

== Chart performance ==
| Chart (1968) | Peak position |
|---|---|
| US Top Country Albums (Billboard) | 24 |

== Release history ==
| Region | Date | Format | Label | Ref. |
|---|---|---|---|---|
| United States | March 1968 | Vinyl | Decca | |
| Canada | March 1968 | Vinyl | Decca | |
| United Kingdom | 1969 | Vinyl | MCA | |
