= Milwaukee, Here I Come =

1968 song

Single by George Jones & Brenda Carter

from the album I'll Share My World with You
- B-side: "Great Big Spirit of Love"
- Released: 1968
- Recorded: 1968
- Genre: Country
- Length: 2:38
- Label: Musicor
- Songwriter: Lee Fykes
- Producer: Pappy Daily

George Jones & Brenda Carter singles chronology
"As Long as I Live" (1968)	"Milwaukee, Here I Come" (1968)	"When the Grass Grows Over Me" (1968)

"Milwaukee, Here I Come" is a 1968 song written by Lee Fykes and recorded as a duet by American country singers George Jones and Brenda Carter. The single, released on the Musicor label, was a hit, reaching #12 on the Billboard country singles chart. Carter was also signed to Musicor, which is the main reason she was brought in to sing with Jones on the track, and in an interview with Music City News in the summer of 1968, Jones expressed interest in producing the seventeen-year-old Maynardville, Tennessee singer. However, Jones would soon make several television appearances singing "Milwaukee, Here I Come" with Tammy Wynette, whom he married in 1969.

Porter Wagoner and Dolly Parton also covered the song, including it on their 1969 album Always, Always.

John Prine covered it with Melba Montgomery on his Grammy-nominated 1999 album In Spite of Ourselves.
