= Happy State of Mind =

Single by Bill Anderson

from the album Happy State of Mind
- B-side: "Time's Been Good to Me"
- Released: July 1968
- Genre: Country
- Label: Decca
- Songwriter: Bill Anderson

Bill Anderson singles chronology
"Wild Week-End" (1968)	"Happy State of Mind" (1968)	"My Life (Throw It Away If I Want To)" (1969)

"Happy State of Mind" is a single by American country music artist Bill Anderson. Released in July 1968, it was the first single from his album Happy State of Mind. The song peaked at number 2 on the Billboard Hot Country Singles chart. It also reached number 1 on the RPM Country Tracks chart in Canada.

== Chart performance ==
Chart (1968)	Peak position
U.S. Billboard Hot Country Singles	2
Canadian RPM Country Tracks	1
