= L. E. White =

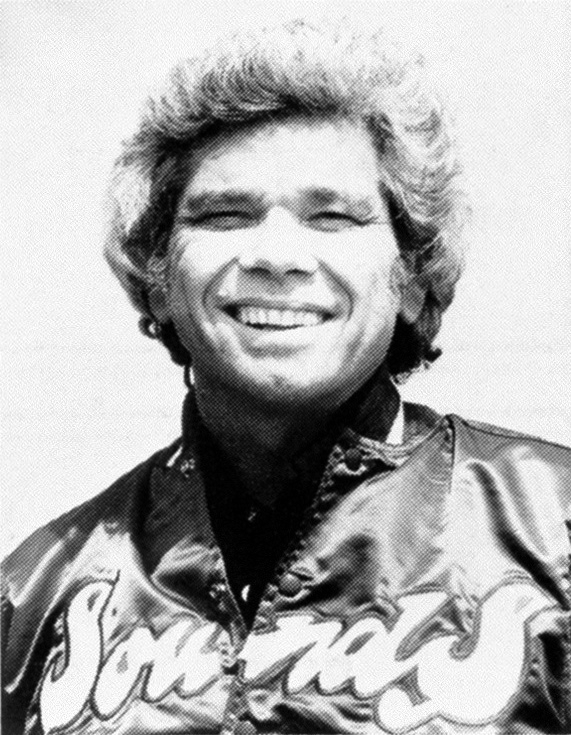
- White in 1978

Background information
- Born: May 27, 1930; Blaine, Tennessee, United States
- Died: September 7, 2004 (aged 74) Hendersonville, Tennessee, United States
- Genres: Country, bluegrass
- Occupations: Singer, songwriter
- Instruments: Vocals, fiddle

L. E. White (27 May 1930 – 7 September 2004) was an American Grammy Award-winning songwriter, singer and musician.

== Life and career ==
Luther Elmer White Jr. was born in 1930 in Blaine, Tennessee to Luther and Lillie (Jones) White.

He began his career in 1949 playing bluegrass fiddle with The Bailey Brothers. In the 1950s, he played with Bill Monroe's Blue Grass Boys and Wilma Lee & Stoney Cooper's Clinch Mountain Clan. He also appeared with the Osborne Brothers in 1953.

As a songwriter, White had over two hundred songs recorded, including the "After the Fire Is Gone", written for Loretta Lynn and Conway Twitty, who won the 1971 Grammy Award for Best Country Performance by a Duo or Group with Vocal. He had a number one hit with Twitty's "I Love You More Today" in 1969. He also co-wrote Twitty's hit songs "To See My Angel Cry" (1969) and "I'm Not Through Loving You Yet" (1974). White and Lola Jean Dillon charted in 1977 with their recordings of "Home, Sweet Home" and "You're the Reason Our Kids Are Ugly."

In further collaboration with Conway Twitty, White established and administered Twitty's publishing companies, Hello Darling Music and Twitty Bird Music.

From 1978 to 1984, White was a minority shareholder in the Nashville Sounds, a Double-A Minor League Baseball team in Nashville, Tennessee.

White died of a heart attack on September 7, 2004, at age 74, at his home in Hendersonville, Tennessee.

== Personal ==
White was the father of Michael White, a songwriter who recorded for Reprise Records in the early 1990s.
