= Bill Anderson's Country Style =

Compilation album by Bill Anderson
- Released: March 1968
- Recorded: 1958–1961
- Studio: Bradley Studios (Nashville, Tennessee)
- Genre: Country; Nashville Sound
- Label: Vocalion
- Producer: Owen Bradley

Bill Anderson chronology
For Loving You (1968)	Bill Anderson's Country Style (1968)	Wild Weekend (1968)

Bill Anderson's Country Style is a compilation album by American country singer-songwriter Bill Anderson. It was released in March 1968 via Vocalion Records and was produced by Owen Bradley. It was Anderson's first release for Vocalion and the fourth compilation issued in his career. A total of ten tracks were included in the package containing all previously recorded material.

== Background, content and release ==
Bill Anderson's Country Style contained a series of previously released recordings by Bill Anderson. These recordings were cut early in his career with Decca Records, specifically between 1958 and 1961. The sessions were completed at the Bradley Studio in Nashville, Tennessee. Anderson was produced by Owen Bradley, his longtime record producer at the label.

Country Style contained ten tracks. Among the tracks recorded, only two were previously released as singles: "Ninety Nine" and "Walk Out Backwards." Both singles were top twenty hits for Anderson. Other cuts from the album include cover versions of "Blue Eyes Crying in the Rain" and "Yonder Comes a Sucker."

Bill Anderson's Country Style was released in March 1968 via Vocalion Records. It was his first release for the budget label and fourth compilation released in his music career. The album was issued as a vinyl LP, containing five songs on each side of the record. Like some of his other compilations, the record did not reach any chart positions on Billboard upon its release. This included the Top Country Albums chart.

== Track listing ==
Side one
No.	Title	Writer(s)	Length
1.	"Columbus Stockade Blues"	Traditional	2:11
2.	"As Long as I Live"	Roy Acuff	2:22
3.	"Ninety-Nine"	Bill Anderson	2:28
4.	"Walk Out Backwards"	Anderson	2:27
5.	"Yonder Comes a Sucker"	Jim Reeves	2:03

Side two
No.	Title	Writer(s)	Length
1.	"It Takes a Worried Man"	Traditional	2:38
2.	"The Thrill of My Life"	Anderson	2:25
3.	"Blue Eyes Crying in the Rain"	Fred Rose	2:37
4.	"It's Not the End of Everything"	Anderson	2:20
5.	"Wedding Bells"	Traditional	3:34

== Personnel ==
All credits are adapted from the liner notes of Bill Anderson's Country Style.

Musical personnel

- Bill Anderson – lead vocals
- Owen Bradley – producer

== Release history ==
Region	Date	Format	Label	Ref.
Canada	March 1968	Vinyl	Vocalion Records	
United States	March 1968	Vinyl	Vocalion Records	
