= Terry Stafford =

American singer-songwriter (1941–1996)

- Stafford c. 1969
- Born: Terry LaVerne Stafford; November 22, 1941; Hollis, Oklahoma, U.S.
- Died: March 17, 1996 (aged 54); Amarillo, Texas, U.S.
- Occupations: Singer; songwriter; musician
- Years active: 1963–1995
- Musical career
- Genres: Country; rock and roll; R&B; countrypolitan
- Instrument: Vocals
- Labels: Atlantic; Crusader

Terry LaVerne Stafford (November 22, 1941 – March 17, 1996) was an American singer and songwriter, best known for his 1964 US top-10 hit "Suspicion" and the 1973 country music hit "Amarillo by Morning". Stafford was also known for his Elvis Presley sound-alike voice.

== Early life ==
Born in Hollis, Oklahoma, he moved to Amarillo with his family at age seven, starring in basketball and football and graduating from Palo Duro High School in 1960. After a stint singing with a local rockabilly group, he moved to California to pursue a musical career.

== Music career ==
His first recordings were "You Left Me Here To Cry" and "Heartache On The Way", which were released by Stateside and A&M Records, and produced by legendary trumpeter Herb Alpert.

Originally cut as a demonstration, Stafford's version of the Elvis Presley song "Suspicion" was released on the Crusader record label and made it to number three in the U.S. and number 31 on the UK Singles Chart. "Suspicion" had the distinction of being sixth on the Billboard Hot 100 on April 4, 1964, when the Beatles held the top five spots. The following week, "Suspicion" peaked at number three, with the Beatles holding three of the top five spots. Stafford's recording sold over a million copies, and was awarded a gold disc by the Recording Industry Association of America. His follow-up, "I’ll Touch a Star", rose to number 25 in United States. Both recordings were produced by Bob Summers (brother-in-law of Les Paul), who played all the instruments on the tracks, as well as engineering and recording them, except for bass, which was played by Ron Griffith. Summers released his own version in the 1970s, and a remake with Ed Greenwald on vocals in 2008.

Crusader continued releasing material from Stafford (Follow That Rainbow) and his debut album which contained two more covers of Elvis Presley songs (Slowly But Surely and Pocketful of Rainbows), internationally London Records make the releases, with that, the success of Suspicion was such that Terry re-recorded it in Italian. Although this initial success was a great start for Stafford, Crusader went bankrupt shortly afterwards, so Terry spent the rest of the 60s with quite a few record labels.

During this period he also participated in film soundtracks, including Dr. Goldfoot & The Girl Bombs, Born Losers and Wild Wheels, It was in this last one that he would have a film role as the character "Hury".

In 1969, Buck Owens rewrote Stafford's "Big in Dallas", recording it as "Big in Vegas". Owens' version peaked at number five on the Billboard Hot Country Singles chart. and reached No. 1 on the RPM Country Tracks chart in Canada.

Stafford continued to record, but had no more hits. His 1973 release/joint composition "Amarillo by Morning" was covered by George Strait on Strait's 1982 album Strait from the Heart. The song was named the number-12 country song of all-time by Country Music Television.

Stafford lived most of his life between Los Angeles and Amarillo, Texas, and he died in Amarillo of liver failure at the age of 54. He is interred with his parents at Llano Cemetery in Amarillo.

A record exists of Nancy E. Hall marrying Terry L. Stafford on 20 May 1972 in Las Vegas, Nevada.

== Death ==
Stafford returned to Amarillo for the last time in 1995, according to Specht. He had been battling liver and kidney ailments for years, and his condition worsened for months until he was finally hospitalized. Collins, in an email to Specht, later recalled his goodbye to Stafford while he was on a respirator in the hospital’s intensive-care unit.

“I said… ‘Terry, I know you can’t speak with that thing in your throat, but just wiggle your fingers to let Ol’ Dugg know that you know I came to see you.,” said Collins, who noted that Stafford wiggled his fingers.

== Discography ==
=== Albums ===
Year	Album	US	Label
1964	Suspicion!	81	Crusader
1973	Say, Has Anybody Seen My Sweet Gypsy Rose	—	Atlantic

=== Singles ===
Year	Single	Chart Positions					Album
Year	Single	US Country	US	US AC	CAN Country	CAN	Album
1964	"Suspicion"	—	3	—	—	4	Suspicion!
1964	"I'll Touch a Star"	—	25	4	—	10	Suspicion!
1964	"Follow the Rainbow"	—	101	—	—	—	Suspicion!
1973	"Say, Has Anybody Seen My Sweet Gypsy Rose"	35	—	—	46	—	Say, Has Anybody Seen My Sweet Gypsy Rose
1973	"Amarillo by Morning"	31	—	—	38	—	Say, Has Anybody Seen My Sweet Gypsy Rose
1974	"Captured"	24	—	—	39	—	Say, Has Anybody Seen My Sweet Gypsy Rose
1974	"Stop If You Love Me"	69	—	—	—	—	singles only
1977	"It Sure Is Bad to Love Her"	94	—	—	—	—	singles only
1989	"Lonestar Lonesome"	89	—	—	—	—	singles only
