= No One's Gonna Hurt You Anymore =

Single by Bill Anderson

from the album Wild Weekend
- B-side: "Something to Believe In"
- Released: June 1967
- Recorded: April 28, 1967
- Studio: Bradley Studio
- Genre: Country; Nashville Sound
- Length: 2:25
- Label: Decca
- Songwriters: Ted Cooper; Steve Karliski
- Producer: Owen Bradley

Bill Anderson singles chronology
| "Get While the Gettin's Good" (1967) | "No One's Gonna Hurt You Anymore" (1967) | "Stranger on the Run" (1967) |

"Get While the Gettin's Good" is a song written by Ted Cooper and Steve Karliski. It was first recorded by American country singer-songwriter Bill Anderson. It was released as a single in 1967 via Decca Records and became a major hit.

== Background and release ==
"No One's Gonna Hurt You Anymore" was recorded on April 28, 1967, at the Bradley Studio, located in Nashville, Tennessee. The sessions were produced by Owen Bradley, who would serve as Anderson's producer through most of years with Decca Records. Two additional tracks were cut at the same session, including his major hit "Wild Week-End."

"No One's Gonna Hurt You Anymore" was released as a single by Decca Records in June 1967. The song spent 19 weeks on the Billboard Hot Country Singles before reaching number ten in March 1967. It was Anderson's first major hit released that had not been composed by him. It was later released on his 1968 studio album, Wild Weekend.

== Track listings ==
7" vinyl single

- "Get While the Gettin's Good" – 2:32
- "Something to Believe In" – 2:57

== Chart performance ==
| Chart (1967) | Peak position |
|---|---|
| US Hot Country Songs (Billboard) | 10 |
