= Carlton Haney =

American musician and event promoter (1928–2011)

- Born: Lawrence Carlton Haney; September 19, 1928; Rockingham County, North Carolina
- Died: March 16, 2011 (aged 82); Moses H. Cone Memorial Hospital in Greensboro, North Carolina
- Occupations: Booking agent, songwriter, promoter
- Known for: Instituting first multi-day bluegrass festival

Lawrence Carlton Haney (September 19, 1928 – March 16, 2011) was an American booking agent, festival promoter, and songwriter primarily active in bluegrass music. Once dubbed “The P.T. Barnum of Country Music” for his large personality, Haney is best known for organizing the first multi-day bluegrass music festival as well as influencing the careers of the Osborne Brothers, Porter Wagoner, Conway Twitty, Merle Haggard, The Statler Brothers and Loretta Lynn. He was inducted to the Bluegrass Hall of Fame in 1998 by the International Bluegrass Music Association.

== Early life ==
Haney was born in Rockingham County, North Carolina, on September 19, 1928, just as the Bristol Sessions were in full swing. While he was growing up, he didn't like country music at all. In an interview with Fred Bartenstein on August 4, 1971, Haney said he had enjoyed hearing his brother Charles Haney and some friends singing "Rainbow at Midnight" and began to enjoy a few of Ernest Tubb's records, but still disliked country music. He grew up listening to Bill Monroe, but claims to have never understood why people liked to listen to the music. Then he met Clyde Moody, who knew Bill Monroe and introduced the two future partners. Haney was offered a job working for Monroe and took it solely based on monetary reasoning. "I was at Clyde's house, and he [Bill Monroe] come there, in Danville, Virginia. Then I met him and two or three months after that he called me and said he had some show dates canceled and [asked] would I book four or five show dates for him and I did and they turned out real good."

Monroe informed Haney that if he ever wanted to quit his job at a battery plant making automobile batteries, he could go to work for him. Haney worked with Monroe for about a year and a half booking shows and traveling with the band. Haney had another opportunity through Monroe to work at Bean Blossom. He stayed there from June until September 1955. Although Haney still had not developed an appreciation for the music he was promoting, he took pride in the fact that he was associated with Monroe and his contributions to this music, which had grown in popularity. When Haney went back to North Carolina he stumbled upon a band that needed someone to help them book shows. They were called the Farm Hands and included Allen Shelton, Curly Howard and Roy Russell.

== Professional career ==
In 1953, Bill Monroe hired Haney as a booking agent for his band, Bill Monroe and the Blue Grass Boys. Haney booked for the band until 1965. Haney was responsible for recruiting fiddler-star Bobby Hicks to band in 1954, initially as a bass player.

Haney also managed bluegrass duo Reno and Smiley between 1955 and 1964. While working with Reno and Smiley, he initiated the daily television show, “Top ‘o the Morning,” on WDBJ, Roanoke and wrote and co-wrote Reno & Smiley staples songs "He Will Forgive You," "Kneel Down", "I Never Get To Hold You In My Arms Anymore" and "Jimmy Caught the Dickens (Pushing Ernest in the Tub)."

Beginning in the 1960s, Haney began to lump some of the bluegrass and country acts together on the same stage. With the help of Ralph Rinzler in 1965, Haney produced the first weekend-long bluegrass music festival, held at Cantrell’s Horse Farm in Fincastle, Virginia. This multi-day model became the standard format for bluegrass festivals and there are now more than 500 such events annually. Haney continued staging the festival over the next few years at various locations, including his 160 acres of renovated land in Camp Springs, NC.

During the 1970s, Haney published Muleskinner News, a prominent monthly bluegrass magazine and the second of its kind. He co-wrote songs such as The Letter and To See My Angel Cry.

== Death ==
Haney died Wednesday on March 16, 2011, at Moses H. Cone Memorial Hospital in Greensboro, North Carolina, of complications from a stroke at the age of 82.

He is survived by his daughter Bonnie and granddaughter Amanda Tarte.

== Awards and legacy ==
Haney was honored with The International Bluegrass Music Association (IBMA)'s Award of Merit in 1990 and was later inducted into The Bluegrass Hall of Fame in 1998.

The IBMA describe the lasting impact of Haney's multi-day festival: "The event proved to be a prototype and precursor that initiated the festival movement in America and ultimately in other countries, bringing incalculable economic benefits to the industry and creating a larger and more diverse audience for the music."

== In Media ==
Haney was featured prominently in the 1971 movie Bluegrass: Country Soul, which was reissued on DVD in 2006.

He can be heard introducing Merle Haggard on two live albums, Okie From Muskogee (1969) and The Fightin' Side of Me (1970)
