= Amarillo by Morning (song) =

1973 country-western song popularized by George Strait

Single by Terry Stafford

from the album Say, Has Anybody Seen My Sweet Gypsy Rose
- A-side: "Say, Has Anybody Seen My Sweet Gypsy Rose"
- Released: November 1973
- Recorded: 1973
- Studio: Jack Clement Recording (Nashville, Tennessee)
- Genre: Country pop
- Length: 2:28
- Label: Atlantic
- Songwriters: Paul Fraser; Terry Stafford
- Producer: Earl Poole Ball

Terry Stafford singles chronology
"Say, Has Anybody Seen My Sweet Gypsy Rose" (1973)	"Amarillo by Morning" (1973)	"Captured" (1974)

"Amarillo by Morning" is a country music song written by Terry Stafford and Paul Fraser, and originally recorded in a country pop style by Stafford as a single in 1973 to minor success. The song would be popularized in a fiddle-based Western rendition by Texas neotraditionalist George Strait in 1982.

== Content ==
The song is sung from the point of view of a rodeo cowboy, driving at night from San Antonio to a county fair in Amarillo, that will begin the following morning. The man recounts the hardships his occupation has caused him, including divorce, broken bones, and poverty, but states that he does not regret his lifestyle: "I ain't rich / But Lord, I'm free." The song has appeared in several lists of the best country songs.

== Original recording ==
Stafford conceived the song after playing with his band at a rodeo in San Antonio, Texas, and then driving back to his home in Amarillo. Stafford conveyed the concept and title he pulled from a FedEx commercial to Paul Fraser over the phone and by the next morning Paul had written the song.

Stafford recorded the song on his album Say, Has Anybody Seen My Sweet Gypsy Rose, released in October 1973. The single was released August 2, 1973, by Atlantic Records with the master number 26867. The single "Say, Has Anybody Seen My Sweet Gypsy Rose" had been previously released as an A-side 45 (Atlantic Master 26868; June 7, 1973), but due to the success of "Amarillo by Morning", the single was re-released October 4, 1973, as the A-side (Atlantic Master 26867-1 stereo and Atlantic Master 26867-2 mono), with "Say, Has Anybody Seen My Sweet Gypsy Rose" on the B-side. The song entered the Cash Box Country Looking Ahead chart November 3, 1973, the Cash Box Country chart on December 15, 1973, peaking at No. 37, the Billboard Country chart December 1, 1973, peaking at No. 31, the Record World Country chart December 15, 1973, peaking at No. 50, and Canada RPM Country chart January 26, 1974, peaking at No. 38.

== George Strait version ==
"Amarillo by Morning"

Single by George Strait

from the album Strait from the Heart
- B-side: "Lover in Disguise"
- Released: January 14, 1983
- Recorded: April 13, 1982
- Studio: Music City Music Hall (Nashville, Tennessee)
- Genre: Western; outlaw country; honky-tonk; Western swing
- Length: 2:52
- Label: MCA 52162
- Songwriters: Paul Fraser; Terry Stafford
- Producer: Blake Mevis

George Strait singles chronology
"Marina del Rey" (1982)	"Amarillo by Morning" (1983)	"A Fire I Can't Put Out" (1983)

George Strait recorded the song for his 1982 album Strait from the Heart (LP MCA 5320). It was released on MCA as a single, release number 52162. The publisher's release was January 14, 1983, and the full release came February 16, 1983. The single entered the Billboard Country chart February 12, 1983, peaking at No. 4. It has since become one of Strait's signature songs and was certified four-times Platinum by RIAA.

This cover woke up Rick Husband while he piloted the STS-96 scientific space mission, and was played for the entire crew during STS-114 in honor of the Amarillo-born astronaut.

=== Critical reception ===
"Amarillo by Morning" is widely considered to be one of Strait's best songs. Billboard and American Songwriter ranked the song number nine and number six, respectively, on their lists of the ten greatest George Strait songs. In 2024, Rolling Stone ranked the song at number ten on its 200 Greatest Country Songs of All Time ranking.

Kevin John Coyne of Country Universe gave the song an A grade, saying that he has "finally found his niche as a performer." He goes on to say that the "simple arrangement and understated delivery are the defining elements of just about every Strait record since."

=== Chart performance ===
Chart (1983)	Peak position
US Hot Country Songs (Billboard)	4
Canadian RPM Country Tracks	1

== Certifications ==
Region	Certification	Certified units/sales
United States (RIAA)	4× Platinum	4,000,000^{‡}
^{‡} Sales+streaming figures based on certification alone.

== Other cover versions ==
The song has been covered by numerous artists, including rodeo champion Chris LeDoux in 1975 on his album Life as a Rodeo Man, Asleep at the Wheel and John Arthur Martinez on his 2004 album Lone Starry Night.

South Texas recording artist Clifton Jansky from San Antonio recorded the song in November 1979 in Ludwig Studios in Houston, Texas. He had a regional hit in Texas, Oklahoma, New Mexico and Louisiana. Three years later, he exchanged soundtracks with Kelly Schoppa in Houston. He traded his soundtrack to "Amarillo by Morning" for a duet that Kelly had recorded in Nashville with Janie Fricke and no money changed hands.

Canadian indie rock artist Fancey covered the song on his 2018 album of 1960s and 1970s country songs County Fair. Brazilian singer Zé Ramalho also recorded the song, with different lyrics, under the name "Entre a Serpente e a Estrela".

Country music singer John Rich covered the song from the television special George Strait: ACM Artist of the Decade All Star Concert.

In 2025, Charley Crockett included a cover of the song on his album Lonesome Drifter.

== Legacy ==
"Amarillo by Morning" was named "No. 12 country song of all time" by Country Music Television in 2004. In 2010, members of the Western Writers of America chose it as one of the Top 100 Western songs of all time. A 2003 survey of tourism-related officials by Development Counsellors International named "Amarillo by Morning" the 7th-best song about a place.

The song is regularly played at rodeos.

The song was parodied by hosts Brad Paisley and Carrie Underwood at the 2013 Country Music Association Awards as "Obamacare by Morning", which mocked technical problems with that year's rollout of the federal HealthCare.gov website as part of the Affordable Care Act.

The song was mentioned in the lyrics of the 2025 hit single Choosin' Texas by Ella Langley.
