= The Canadian Sweethearts =

Canadian singing duo

- Origin: Vancouver, British Columbia, Canada
- Genres: Country; Rockabilly
- Years active: 1958–1977
- Labels: Almo International Records, A&M Records, Epic Records
- Members: Lucille Starr; Bob Regan

The Canadian Sweethearts, sometimes known as Bob & Lucille, were a Canadian singing duo who were popular during the 1960s, disbanding in 1977. The duo consisted of vocalist Lucille Starr and her guitar-playing husband, Bob Regan. They are best known for the rockabilly song, "Eeny Meeny Miney Moe". Their contribution to the genre has been recognized by the Rockabilly Hall of Fame.

== History ==
Regan was born Robert Frederickson on March 13, 1931, in Rolla, British Columbia. As a child he played harmonica, guitar, mandolin and fiddle. Starr was born Lucille Marie Raymonde Savoie on May 13, 1938, in St. Boniface, Manitoba. In 1958, Regan had been performing in his brother Keray's band, The Peace Rangers, and had recorded a single, "Teenage Boogie"/"I Will Never Hold Another", singing a duet with his sister Fern on the B-side. Starr had performed in the French band Les Hirondelles and later as a solo singer. They met at a wedding and began performing together. They soon married and began to perform and record in Canada, calling themselves "Bob and Lucille". Their first recording was the 1958 single "Eeny-Meeny-Miney-Moe", released by Ditto, a small recording studio in Hollywood, California. A second single, "The Big Kiss"/"What's the Password", was also released by Ditto.

At this point, they started billing themselves as "The Canadian Sweethearts" and, in 1961, released a single, "No Help Wanted", with Soma. They performed and toured in the US and Canada. In 1963, they signed with A&M Records and released two albums and a number of singles, including "Out For Fun"/"Freight Train". None were commercially successful in the US, although three were near the top of the Canadian charts. In 1964, Starr recorded "The French Song", singing solo and backed by the Tijuana Brass, the label co-owner Herb Alpert's band. The single was a hit in Europe and was also popular in Canada where is reached #12.

The Canadian Sweethearts appeared on various television programs, including regular appearances on ABC's Country America show, and toured with Hank Snow.

In 1966, they signed with Epic Records in Nashville, Tennessee, releasing a series of singles, some of which appeared briefly in the charts. The next year, they divorced but continued to perform and record together until 1977. They went on to perform separately.

Regan died on March 5, 1990. Starr died on September 4, 2020.

== Discography ==
=== Albums ===
Year	Album	Label
1962	Say You Love Me (as Bob Regan and Lucille Starr)	A&M
1964	Introducing the Canadian Sweethearts	A&M
1967	The Canadian Sweethearts	Epic

=== Singles ===
Year	Single	Chart Positions		Album
Year	Single	CAN Country	US Country	Album
1964	"Hootenanny Express"	—	45	Introducing the Canadian Sweethearts
1965	"Stand Upon the Mountain"	5	—	Introducing the Canadian Sweethearts
1965	"Lookin' Back to See"	2	—	The Canadian Sweethearts
1966	"Don't Knock on My Door"	1	—	Singles only
1968	"Let's Wait a Little Longer"	—	51	Singles only
1970	"Dream Baby" (as Bob Regan & Lucille Starr)	28	50	Singles only
