= My Life/But You Know I Love You =

Studio album by Bill Anderson
- Released: June 1969
- Recorded: 1968–1969
- Studios: Bradley's Barn, Mount Juliet, Tennessee
- Genres: Country; Nashville Sound
- Label: Decca
- Producer: Owen Bradley

Bill Anderson chronology
The Bill Anderson Story: His Greatest Hits (1969)	My Life/But You Know I Love You (1969)	Christmas (1969)

Singles from My Life/But You Know I Love You
- 1. "My Life (Throw It Away If I Want To)" Released: February 1969; 2. "But You Know I Love You" Released: November 1969

My Life/But You Know I Love You is a studio album by American country singer-songwriter Bill Anderson. It was released in June 1969 on Decca Records and was produced by Owen Bradley. It was Anderson's eleventh studio album to be issued during his musical career. The album's title combines the names of its two singles. Both singles became major hits on the Billboard country chart.

== Background and content ==
My Life/But You Know I Love You was recorded between 1968 and 1969 at Bradley's Barn, a studio owned by producer Owen Bradley that was located in Mount Juliet, Tennessee. It was to be Anderson's eleventh studio recording and eleventh to be produced with Bradley. The LP consisted of 11 tracks. Unlike Anderson's previous album, My Life only included two songs written by Anderson himself. The remainder of the material was written by others. Many of these compositions were cover versions of songs recorded by other performers. Among these tracks was one of the title tracks, "But You Know I Love You". The song was originally recorded and made a hit single by Kenny Rogers and the First Edition. "A Picture from Life's Other Side" had been originally cut by Hank Williams. Another track, "I Am," was written by Carter Howard, who was the son of Anderson's duet partner Jan Howard. In 1970, Howard would issue her own version of her son's track on the album For God and Country.

== Release and reception ==
My Life/But You Know I Love You was released on Decca Records in June 1969. The album was issued as a vinyl LP, with six songs on side one and five songs on side two. The album spent a total of 23 weeks on the Billboard Top Country Albums chart before peaking at number four in September 1969. It became one of Anderson's highest-charting albums. My Life included 2 singles that were derived from the title of the album. The first single issued was "My Life (Throw It Away If I Want To)" in February 1969. The song became Anderson's fourth number one single on the Billboard Hot Country Singles chart that year. The song also reached number two on the RPM Country Singles chart in Canada. The second single issued was "But You Know I Love You" in November 1969. The song reached number two on the Billboard country songs chart following its release. In addition, the single would reach number 6 on the RPM Country Singles list. In later years, My Life/But You Know I Love You was reviewed by Allmusic and received a rating of three out of five possible stars.

== Track listing ==
Side one
No.	Title	Writer(s)	Length
1.	"My Life (Throw It Away If I Want To)"	Bill Anderson	2:40
2.	"To Be Alone"	Billy Vaughn	2:30
3.	"Games People Play"	Joe South	3:15
4.	"Us"	Anderson	3:05
5.	"Apologize"	Jimmy Griffin; Michael Z. Gordon	1:49
6.	"Hungry Eyes"	Merle Haggard	3:29

Side two
No.	Title	Writer(s)	Length
1.	"But You Know I Love You"	Mike Settle	2:50
2.	"A Picture from Life's Other Side"	Hank Williams	3:10
3.	"Why You Been Gone So Long"	Mickey Newbury	2:43
4.	"Yours Love"	Harlan Howard	2:15
5.	"I Am"	Carter Howard	2:52

== Personnel ==
All credits are adapted from the liner notes of My Life/But You Know I Love You.

Musical personnel

- Bill Anderson – lead vocals
- Harold Bradley – guitar
- Ray Edenton – guitar
- Buddy Harman – drums
- Roy Huskey – bass
- The Jordanaires – background vocals
- Jimmy Lance – guitar
- Grady Martin – guitar
- Charlie McCoy – harmonica, trumpet, vibes
- Hal Rugg – steel guitar
- Jerry Smith – piano, organ

Technical personnel

- Owen Bradley – record producer

== Chart performance ==
Chart (1969)	Peak position
US Top Country Albums (Billboard)	4

== Release history ==
Region	Date	Format	Label	Ref.
United States	June 1969	Vinyl	Decca	
Canada	June 1969	Vinyl	Decca	
