= She Still Comes Around =

Studio album by Jerry Lee Lewis
- Released: 1969
- Recorded: Columbia Studios, Nashville, Tennessee
- Genre: Country, honky-tonk
- Length: 27:48
- Label: Smash
- Producer: Jerry Kennedy

Jerry Lee Lewis chronology
Another Place, Another Time (1968)	She Still Comes Around (1969)	Sings the Country Music Hall of Fame Hits, Vol. 1 (1969)

She Still Comes Around (To Love What's Left of Me) is the ninth studio album by American musician and pianist Jerry Lee Lewis. It was released on Smash Records in 1969.

== Reception ==
Professional ratings
Review scores
Source	Rating
Allmusic	5/5 stars
Rolling Stone	(positive)

She Still Comes Around rose to number 12 on the Billboard country album chart. AllMusic calls it "a pure country record, made for late nights and smoky bars, and it's nearly as good as Another Place, containing the same consistent high quality of songs and performance." Even the album cover – an evocative photo of a despondent Lewis in a decrepit hotel room – was singled out for praise for bringing the title track to life.

== Track listing ==
No.	Title	Writer(s)	Length
1.	"To Make Love Sweeter for You"	Jerry Kennedy; Glenn Sutton	2:52
2.	"Let's Talk About Us"	Otis Blackwell	1:58
3.	"I Can't Get Over You"	Ben Peters	3:06
4.	"Out of My Mind"	Kenny Lovelace	2:23
5.	"Today I Started Loving You Again"	Merle Haggard; Bonnie Owens	2:09
6.	"She Still Comes Around (To Love What's Left of Me)"	Sutton	2:31
7.	"Louisiana Man"	Doug Kershaw	1:48
8.	"Release Me"	Eddie Miller; Dub Williams; Robert Yount	3:02
9.	"Listen, They're Playing My Song"	Glen Garrison; Charlie Williams	2:47
10.	"There Stands the Glass"	Audrey Greisham; Russ Hull; Mary Jean Shurtz	2:39
11.	"Echoes"	Cecil Harrelson; Linda Gail Lewis	2:33
Total length:			27:48
