= Big in Vegas =

Single by Buck Owens

from the album Big in Vegas
- B-side: "White Satin Bed"
- Released: October 1969
- Genre: Country
- Label: Capitol
- Songwriters: Buck Owens; Terry Stafford

Buck Owens singles chronology
"Tall Dark Stranger" (1969)	"Big in Vegas" (1969)	"The Kansas City Song" (1970)

"Big in Vegas" is a single by American country music artist Buck Owens. Released in October 1969, it was the first single from his album Big in Vegas. The song peaked at number 5 on the Billboard Hot Country Singles chart. It also reached number 1 on the RPM Country Tracks chart in Canada.

== Content ==
The song is about a young singer hoping to realize his dream to perform in a large venue in Las Vegas, Nevada, despite his mother's pleas not to go. Despite the struggles of playing smaller arenas, honky tonks and so forth, he continues to be driven by his dream of one day having his name in lights and performing before a large crowd.

== Music video ==
A music video of the song – compiled of Owens singing, over superimposed footage of an Owens' concert and nighttime shots of the Las Vegas Strip – was originally aired on the TV series Hee Haw, on which Owens was a co-host. The video has since aired on Great American Country.

== Chart performance ==
Chart (1969–1970)	Peak position
U.S. Billboard Hot Country Singles	5
U.S. Billboard Hot 100	100
Canadian RPM Country Tracks	1
