= Larry Mercey =

Canadian singer

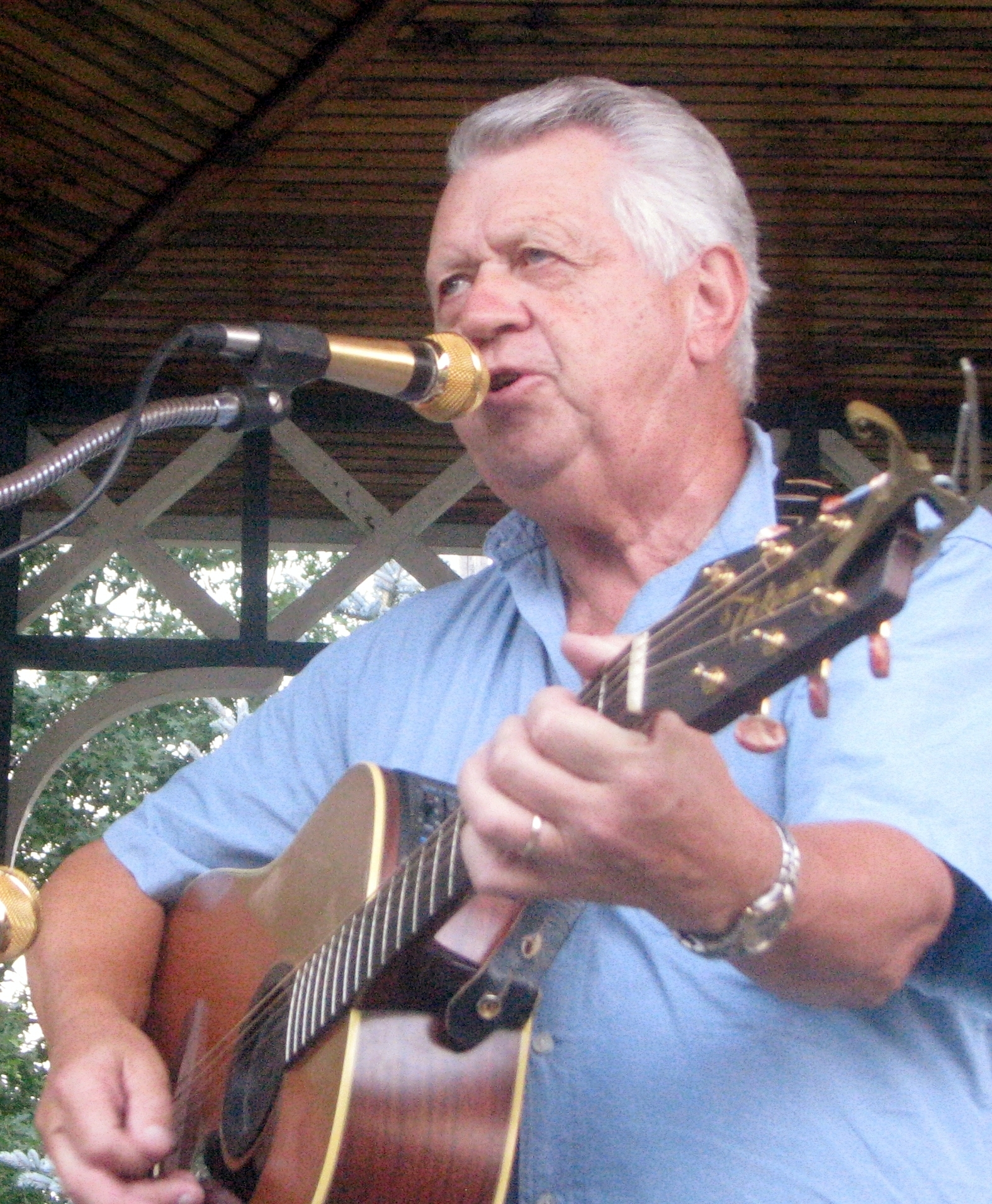

Background information
- Born: December 12, 1939 (age 86)
- Origin: Hanover, Ontario, Canada
- Genres: Country
- Occupation: Singer
- Instrument: Vocals
- Years active: 1990–present
- Labels: MBS; Rodeo
- Website: Official website

Larry Mercey (born December 12, 1939) is a Canadian country music artist, best known as the lead singer of the 6-time Juno Winning Mercey Brothers band.

== Early life ==
Mercey was born in Hanover, Ontario.

== Career ==
Mercey was a member of the band The Mercey Brothers, who performed and recorded country music for 30 years, beginning in about 1960, and were signed to the RCA label. They were a regular act on the CKNX Barn Dance radio show and later on CKNX television. Larry Mercey wrote several of the group's hit songs.

After the Mercey Brothers band broke up, Mercey began a solo career, living in Waterloo, Ontario and fronting the Larry Mercey Trio with George Lonsbury and Al Alderson.

Mercey was nominated for Best Country Male Vocalist at the Juno Awards in 1991 and 1993. His 1993 single "If I'm Only Good for One Thing" reached the Top 20 of the RPM Country Tracks chart.

In 2011 Mercey co-wrote a song which was recorded by country singer Charlie Pride.

== Discography ==
=== Albums ===
Year	Album	Label
1990	Full Speed Ahead	MBS
1994	Let's Deal Again	Rodeo

=== Singles ===
Year	Single	CAN Country	Album
1990	"She Feels Like a New Man Tonight"	32	Full Speed Ahead
1990	"Full Speed Ahead"	42	Full Speed Ahead
1991	"You're Still in These Crazy Arms of Mine"	22	Full Speed Ahead
1991	"True Blue"	29	Full Speed Ahead
1992	"Hold That Thought"	50	Full Speed Ahead
1992	"Keepin' Up with the Jones'"	35	Let's Deal Again
1993	"I Might Be Down (But I Ain't Out Yet)"	46	Let's Deal Again
1993	"If I'm Only Good for One Thing"	17	Let's Deal Again
1994	"Wild West Show"	66	Let's Deal Again
