= Wild Weekend (Bill Anderson album) =

Studio album by Bill Anderson
- Released: May 1968
- Recorded: 1967–1968
- Studios: Bradley's Barn, Mount Juliet, Tennessee
- Genres: Country; Nashville Sound
- Label: Decca
- Producer: Owen Bradley

Bill Anderson chronology
Bill Anderson's Country Style (1968)	Wild Weekend (1968)	Happy State of Mind (1968)

Singles from Wild Weekend
- 1. "No One's Gonna Hurt You Anymore" Released: July 1967; 2. "Wild Week-End" Released: March 1968

Wild Weekend is a studio album by American country singer-songwriter Bill Anderson. It was released in May 1968 on Decca Records and was produced by Owen Bradley. The record was Anderson's ninth studio release to be issued during his recording career. It reached peak positions on the Billboard country albums chart and also produced two singles that became major hits.

== Background and content ==
Wild Weekend was recorded at Bradley's Barn studio in Mount Juliet, Tennessee. The sessions took place between 1967 and 1968 under the supervision of the studio's owner, producer Owen Bradley. It was Anderson's ninth studio album with Bradley since their first collaboration with his debut record in 1963. Unlike his previous Decca releases, Wild Weekend contained 11 tracks. Two of the album's songs were written by Anderson himself while the remaining songs were written by other artists and songwriters. It also included cover versions of songs previously recorded by others. Among these tracks was Tom Paxton's "The Last Thing on My Mind", the Osborne Brothers's "Rocky Top" and Glen Campbell's "Gentle on My Mind".

== Release and reception ==
Professional ratings
Review scores
Source	Rating
Allmusic	3.5/5 stars

Wild Weekend was released in May 1968 on Decca Records. The album was issued as a vinyl record, with six songs on side one and five songs on side two. The album reached number ten on the Billboard Top Country Albums chart in July 1968 and spent a total of 22 weeks on that chart. The album included two singles that also became major hits. Its first single release was "No One's Gonna Hurt You Anymore" in July 1967. By September 1967, the song peaked at number ten on the Billboard Hot Country Singles chart.

The second single issued was the title track in March 1968. The song reached number two on the Billboard country chart in June 1968 after spending 18 weeks on the chart. In later years, Wild Weekend received a review from Allmusic. Writer Eugene Chadbourne gave the studio release 3.5 out of 5 possible stars. Chadbourne called the record a "juxtaposition" to what the title of it entails. "There are record collectors who would acquire this side just to laugh at the cover, since the juxtaposition of the Wild Weekend idea with a photograph of the artist having a bad hair day creates instant belly chuckles. Put the needle on the title track, however, and the laughter will be replaced with looks of awe, especially if the listener is a country fan," he wrote.

== Track listing ==
Side one
No.	Title	Writer(s)	Length
1.	"Wild Week-End"	Bill Anderson	2:22
2.	"Little Green Apples"	Bobby Russell	3:10
3.	"Won't It Ever Be Morning"	Anderson	2:15
4.	"The Last Thing on My Mind"	Tom Paxton	2:29
5.	"Ring Around a Rosie"	Ray Griff	2:25
6.	"Long and Warm Ago"	Moneen Carpenter	2:46

Side two
No.	Title	Writer(s)	Length
1.	"No One's Gonna Hurt You Anymore"	Ted Cooper; Steve Karliski	2:25
2.	"Rocky Top"	Felice and Boudleaux Bryant	2:42
3.	"Big Railroad Man"	Neal Jones; Curtis Leach	4:49
4.	"Gentle on My Mind"	John Hartford	2:55
5.	"Sleep"	Jack Clement	2:58

== Personnel ==
All credits are adapted from the liner notes of Wild Weekend.

Musical personnel

- Bill Anderson – lead vocals
- Harold Bradley – guitar
- Jimmy Colvard – guitar
- Buddy Harman – drums
- Roy Huskey – bass
- The Jordanaires – background vocals
- Jimmy Lance – guitar
- Grady Martin – guitar
- Harold Morrison – banjo
- Hal Rugg – steel guitar
- Jerry Smith – piano
- Buddy Spicher – fiddle

Technical personnel

- Owen Bradley – record producer
- Hal Buksbaum – photography

== Chart performance ==
Chart (1968)	Peak position
US Top Country Albums (Billboard)	10

== Release history ==
Region	Date	Format	Label	Ref.
United States	March 1968	Vinyl	Decca	
Canada	March 1968	Vinyl	Decca	
United Kingdom	1970	Vinyl	MCA	
