= I'll Share My World with You (song) =

Single by George Jones

from the album I'll Share My World with You
- B-side: "I'll See You While Ago"
- Released: 1969
- Recorded: 1968
- Genre: Country
- Length: 2:29
- Label: Musicor
- Songwriter: Ben Wilson
- Producer: Pappy Daily

George Jones singles chronology
"When the Grass Grows Over Me" (1968)	"I'll Share My World with You" (1969)	"If Not for You" (1969)

"I'll Share My World with You" is a song by American country singer George Jones. It was written by Ben Wilson and reached #2 when it was released by Jones on the Musicor label in 1969. It also reached #126 on the U.S. pop chart, his first appearance there since "The Race Is On" in 1964. Its title and sentiments are similar to Jones 1967 #1 song "Walk Through This World with Me." Wilson was an elderly man who lived in Miami and had made his way through life making souvenirs from seashells before turning to professional songwriting at age fifty-four and, like many country fans, he had gotten swept up in the rumors swirling around about Jones and Tammy Wynette, recalling, "At that time, George was just about to get married to Tammy, and was very much in love with her. And I was also very much in love with my own wife. After talking to my wife about this, I wrote 'I'll Share My World with You.'" The only song that kept the single from the top spot when it was released in early 1969 was Wynette's hit "Singing My Song." Jones performed "I'll Share My World with You" live throughout his career, usually as part of a medley of older hits.
