= Groovy Grubworm =

Single by Harlow Wilcox and the Oakies

from the album Groovy Grubworm and Other Golden Guitar Greats
- B-side: "Moose Trot"
- Released: November 1969
- Genre: Country
- Length: 2:11
- Label: Plantation
- Songwriter(s): Harlow Wilcox; Bobby Warren
- Producer(s): Bobby Warren

Harlow Wilcox and the Oakies singles chronology
"Groovy Grubworm" (1969)	"Golden Guitar Flower" (1970)

"Groovy Grubworm" is a 1969 instrumental by American session musician Harlow Wilcox. The lead single for his album Groovy Grubworm and Other Golden Guitar Greats, the track became Wilcox's sole charting hit, peaking at #30 on the Billboard Hot 100 and #25 on the Cash Box Top 100. It also reached #1 on the RPM Country Tracks chart in Canada.

== Chart performance ==
Chart (1969–70)	Peak position
U.S. Billboard Hot Country Singles	42
U.S. Billboard Hot 100	30
U.S. Billboard Easy Listening	18
U.S. Cash Box Country Top 60	1
U.S. Cash Box Top 100	25
Canadian RPM Country Tracks	1
Canadian RPM Top Singles	20
