= When the Grass Grows Over Me =

1968 song performed by George Jones

Single by George Jones

from the album I'll Share My World with You
- B-side: "Heartaches and Hangovers"
- Released: 1968
- Recorded: 1968
- Genre: Country
- Length: 2:47
- Label: Musicor
- Songwriter: Don Chapel
- Producer: Pappy Daily

George Jones singles chronology
"Milwaukee (Here I Come)" (1968)	"When the Grass Grows Over Me" (1968)	"I'll Share My World with You" (1969)

"When the Grass Grows Over Me" is a song by George Jones. It was released on the Musicor label in 1968 and rose to #2 on the Billboard country singles chart. The song is credited to Don Chapel, Tammy Wynette's husband before George Jones. Tammy would later claim that in actuality, she was the one who wrote it.

== Theme ==
The song is similar in theme to Jones' later comeback hit "He Stopped Loving Her Today" except from a first person point of view, with the narrator claiming he will only stop loving his departed lover when he is dead and buried:

When you left I thought that I would soon be over you
Even told myself that I would find somebody new
Time and tears have come and gone but not your memory
But I'll be over you when the grass grows over me

In 1969, Conway Twitty cut the song for his LP Darlin', You Know I Wouldn't Lie. A year later, Jerry Lee Lewis recorded it for his album She Even Woke Me Up to Say Goodbye. Tammy Wynette would also perform the song live occasionally.
