= Who Drinks My Beer When I'm Gone =

Single by Mercey Brothers
- Released: March 1969
- Genre: Country
- Label: Columbia

Mercey Brothers singles chronology
"Absent Minded Me" (1968)	"Who Drinks My Beer When I'm Gone" (1969)	"Ordinary Peeping Tom" (1969)

"Who Drinks My Beer When I'm Gone" is a single by Canadian country music group Mercey Brothers. The song debuted at number 36 on the RPM Country Tracks chart on March 17, 1969. It peaked at number 1 on June 9, 1969.

== Chart performance ==
Chart (1969)	Peak position
Canadian RPM Country Tracks	1
