= Lucille Starr =

Canadian singer (1938–2020)

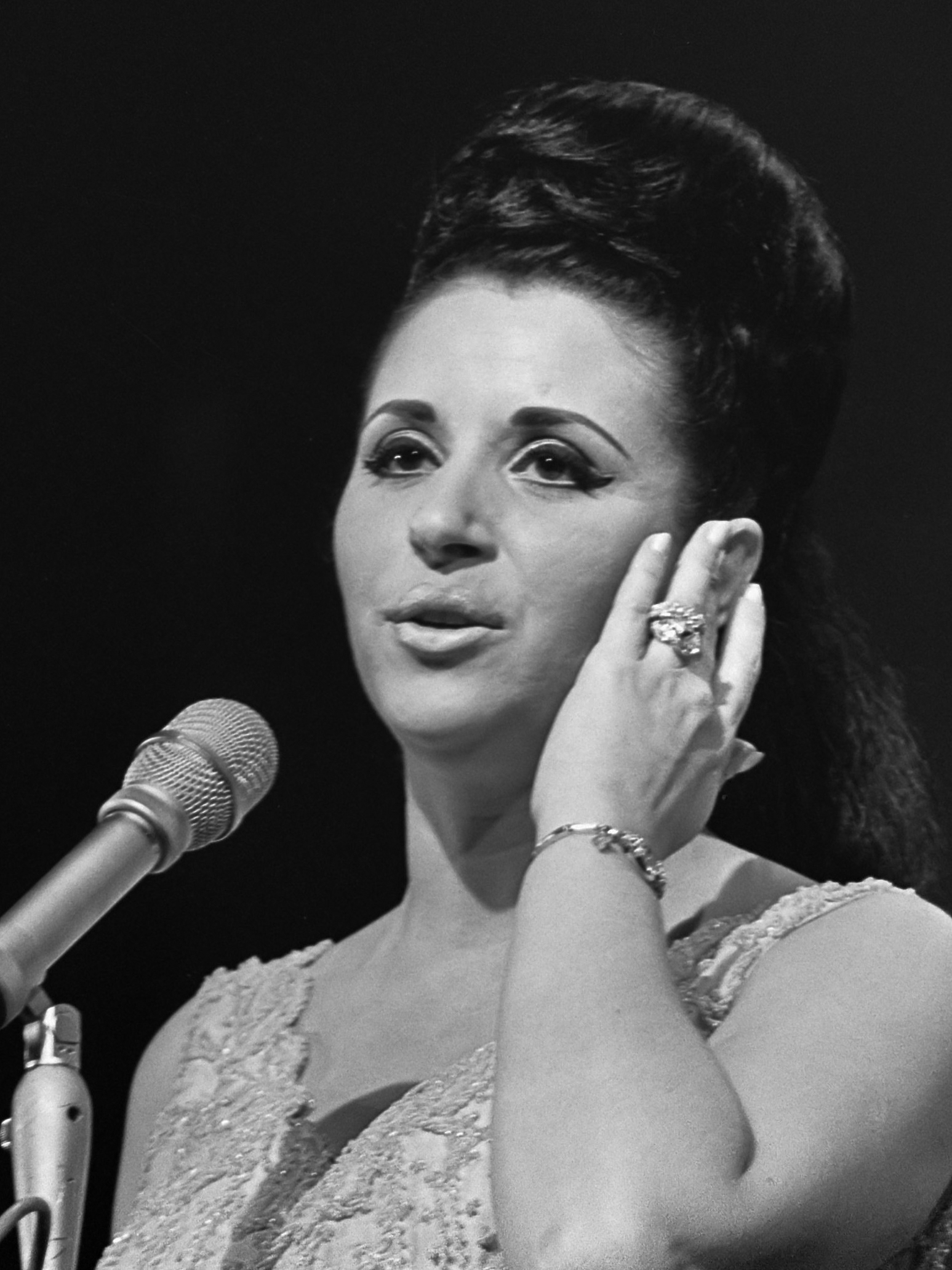
- Starr in 1965

Background information
- Born: Lucille Marie Raymonde Savoie; May 13, 1938; Saint Boniface, Manitoba, Canada
- Died: September 4, 2020 (aged 82) Las Vegas, Nevada, U.S.
- Genre: Country
- Occupations: Singer; songwriter; yodeler
- Instruments: Vocals; guitar; bass; mandolin
- Years active: 1958–2020
- Labels: Almo International, A&M, Epic, Barry

Lucille Marie Raymonde Savoie (May 13, 1938 – September 4, 2020), known professionally as Lucille Starr, was a Canadian singer, songwriter, and yodeler originally from Saint Boniface, Manitoba. She was best known for her 1964 hit single, "The French Song" ("Quand Le Soleil Dit Bonjour Aux Montagnes", When the sun says hello to the mountains).

== Early life ==
Starr was born in the Franco-Manitoban community of Saint Boniface to a musical family. During her childhood years in Saint Boniface, she first sang in church. When Starr was seven the family moved to Maillardville, a Francophone community in Coquitlam, British Columbia, where she learned to play guitar, bass and mandolin.

== Career ==
Savoie started her musical career with the local group Les Hirondelles. She met and married country singer Bob Regan (born Robert Frederickson), and, using the stage name Lucille Starr, she began performing with him as a country singing duo called "Bob & Lucille". Between 1958 and 1963 they released several 45 rpm records that were mainly covers of an eclectic mix of fashionable country, pop, rockabilly and folk songs of people such as Perry Como to Connie Francis. Their records met with modest success on the North American West Coast and in 1963 they were signed by A&M Records in Los Angeles, California, with which they began recording as "The Canadian Sweethearts".

At A&M Records, Starr recorded a song called "The French Song" that was produced by Herb Alpert. This name was chosen because Alpert could not pronounce the original French title "Quand le soleil dit bonjour aux montagnes" (When the sun says Good day to the mountains). It was recorded in a bilingual version with French lyrics in the first half followed by the English translation in the second half. In 1964, at a time when The Beatles dominated the music charts, "The French Song" was an international success that made Starr the first Canadian artist to have a record sell over a million copies. The popularity of the song led to a tour of the United States and appearing on the Louisiana Hayride radio show and on Chicago radio station WLS (AM) popular National Barn Dance. Starr also sang on American television musical variety shows such as Shindig! and Hullabaloo, followed by tours of Pacific Rim countries, Australia, South Africa, and across Europe where she became a particular favorite in the Netherlands. The song sold over one million copies, and it was awarded a gold disc.

In 1967, Starr and her Canadian Sweethearts duo signed a recording contract with Epic Records in Nashville, Tennessee. Divorced from her first husband, their musical collaboration ended in 1977. Although she never again had a hit of the magnitude of "The French Song", Starr enjoyed a long and prosperous career recording primarily in English but also in French and Spanish. For the most part she sang country music, becoming the first female inducted into the Canadian Country Music Association's "Hall of Honor" in 1987. A capable yodeler, she was hired to do the yodeling for the "Cousin Pearl" character on several segments of the hit TV series, The Beverly Hillbillies.

Back to You: the Life and Music of Lucille Starr, a jukebox musical with a script by Tracey Power, was performed at the Prairie Theatre Exchange in Winnipeg in November 2010.

In her honour, a street in the city of Coquitlam was named "Lucille Starr Way".

== Death ==
Starr died in Las Vegas, Nevada, in the early morning hours of September 4, 2020. The announcement of her death was made on Facebook by fellow Canadian artist, Joyce Smith.

Lucille's second husband Bryan Cunningham died October 2, 2023. She is survived by her son Robert Frederickson, stepdaughter Shannon Cunningham and stepson David Cunningham.

== Discography ==
=== Albums ===
Year	Album	Label
1964	The French Song	A&M
1964	South Africa's Sweetheart: Lucille Start with Bob Regan	A&M
1967	Say you love me	A&M
1968	In South Africa	A&M
1968	Greatest Hits	A&M
1968	Remember Me	CBS
1969	Lonely Street	Epic
1971	Side by Side	Harmony
1981	The Sun Shines Again	Starr
1988	Back to You	Quality
1991	Songs of Love	Intersound
1991	Chansons D'Amour	Intersound
1991	Mississippi	Koch

=== Singles ===
Year	Single	Chart Positions							Album
Year	Single	CAN Country	CAN AC	CAN	BEL	NLD	US Country	US	Album
1964	"The French Song"	—	—	9	1	1	—	54	The French Song
1964	"Jolie Jacqueline"	—	—	24	8	19	—	—	The French Song
1965	"Crazy Arms"	5	—	—	—	3	—	—	The French Song
1965	"Colinda"	—	—	43	12	3	—	—	The French Song
1965	"Don't Let The Stars Get In Your Eyes"(with Bob Regan)	—	—	—	—	29	—	—	
1967	"Too Far Gone"	1	—	—	—	—	72	—	Lonely Street
1968	"Is It Love?"	—	—	—	—	—	63	—	single only
1969	"Cajun Love"	1	—	—	—	—	—	—	Lonely Street
1970	"Dream Baby" (with Bob Regan)	28	—	—	—	—	50	—	singles only
1970	"The French Song" (re-release)	39	14	—	—	—	—	—	singles only
1971	"Sock It to Satan"	42	—	—	—	—	—	—	singles only
1981	"Power in Your Love"	37	—	—	—	—	—	—	The Sun Shines Again
1988	"The First Time I've Been in Love"	26	—	—	—	—	—	—	Back to You
1988	"Back to You"	63	—	—	—	—	—	—	Back to You
1990	"Just the Way We Were"	99	—	—	—	—	—	—	Back to You
