= Harlow Wilcox (musician) =

American singer-songwriter

- Born: January 28, 1943
- Origin: Norman, Oklahoma
- Died: August 26, 2002 (aged 59)
- Genres: Country
- Occupation: Musician
- Instrument: Guitar
- Years active: 1969–2002
- Labels: Plantation

Harlow Wilcox (January 28, 1943 – August 26, 2002) was an American session musician from Norman, Oklahoma. In 1969 he released the instrumental single "Groovy Grubworm" on Plantation Records (as Harlow Wilcox and the Oakies), which hit No. 30 on the U.S. Billboard Hot 100 chart late that year. Two albums followed. "Groovy Grubworm" has sold over a million copies and was nominated for a Grammy in 1969. On August 26, 2002, Wilcox died from a heart attack at his home in Oklahoma City.

== Discography ==
=== Albums ===
Year	Album	US Country	Label
1970	Groovy Grubworm and Other Golden Guitar Greats	31	Plantation
1972	Cripple Cricket and Other Country Critters	—	Plantation

=== Singles ===
Year	Single	Chart Positions				Album
Year	Single	US Country	US	CAN Country	CAN	Album
1969	"Groovy Grubworm"	42	30	1	20	Groovy Grubworm and Other Golden Guitar Greats
