= Cajun Love =

Single by Lucille Starr
- Released: April 1969
- Genre: Country
- Label: Epic
- Songwriter(s): Bob Regan, Lucille Starr

Lucille Starr singles chronology
| "Is It Love?" (1968) | "Cajun Love" (1969) | "Dream Baby" (1970) |

"Cajun Love" is a single by Canadian country music artist Lucille Starr. The song debuted at number 36 on the RPM Country Tracks chart on April 14, 1969. It peaked at number 1 on June 16, 1969.

== Chart performance ==
| Chart (1969) | Peak position |
|---|---|
| Canadian RPM Country Tracks | 1 |
