= Mercey Brothers =

Canadian country music group active from 1957 to 1989

- Origin: Hanover, Ontario, Canada
- Genre: Country
- Years active: 1957 – 1989
- Labels: Columbia; Harmony; RCA; MBS
- Members: Larry Mercey; Ray Mercey; Lloyd Mercey
- Website: www.merceybrothers.com

The Mercey Brothers were a Canadian country music group active from 1957 to 1989. The brothers were seven-time Juno Award winners for "The Top Country Group" and were inducted into the Canadian Country Music Hall of Fame.

== Early life ==
All three Mercey brothers were born in Hanover, a small town south of Owen Sound, Ontario. Larry Mercey, the eldest of three, was born on December 12, 1939; Ray was born on November 21, 1940, and Lloyd, the youngest, was born on December 12, 1945.

The Mercey family grew up to music in their household at an early age. Larry Mercey sang on the radio station CKNX Barn Dance in 1956, in the neighbouring town of Wingham, Ontario.

== Band history ==
=== Formation ===
Larry and Ray formed a country music group in 1957, singing and playing the guitar (Larry) and bass (Ray). They called their group The Mercey Brothers and patterned their music and their image to resemble the Everly Brothers, a harmony duo popular in the United States at the time.

Larry and Ray placed second in CBC Television's Talent Caravan in 1960 and later went on to sign with Chateau Records in 1961. They made their first chart appearance with "Just the Snap of Your Fingers" that same year.

=== Trio ===
Lloyd Mercey joined the group as a singer and drummer in 1966 when he was twenty years old, and together they called themselves The Mercey Brothers. After signing with Columbia Records, they released four RPM chart-topping singles, including "Whistling on the River". In 1968, they released the singles "Uncle Tom", "What’s a Guy to Do?", and "The Great Snowman" under their self-titled album The Mercey Brothers.

Singles "Who Drinks My Beer When I’m Gone" and "Ordinary Peeping Tom" came out under albums titled My Song For You (Columbia) and The Mercey Brothers (Harmony) in 1969.

The Mercey Brothers signed with RCA Records in 1970 and released a string of singles which received radio play. At the 1970 Juno Awards, they were named "Best Country Group or Duo". They went on to win this award for the next four years in a row (1970–1974), and again in 1976.

In 1971, The Mercey Brothers toured England for the first time and made an appearance on BBC television. Their hit singles on the RCA album Have Mercey, were "Hello Mom" and "Who Wrote the Words". They also hosted a television show, The Mercey Brothers Show.

In 2021, Larry Mercey wrote a book titled Have Mercy: My First 60 Years Making Music in which one of his recollections is the band's first dates played in Saulte Ste Marie, Ontario.

=== Lineup changes ===
Ray Mercey left the band in 1980 to spend more time with his family. To fill in for Ray's absence, the others brought in bass player Gord Ogilvie and lead guitar Darrell Scott. Over the next few years, artists Dann Peer, Gord Heins, John Dymond, and Eric Mahar filled in for the band. In 1989, the Mercey Brothers disbanded; they were inducted into the Canadian Country Music Hall of Fame that same year.

== Mercey Brothers sound ==
In 1973, The Mercey Brothers opened their own recording studio called Mercey Brothers Recording Studio. That gave them more control over their music and general sound of the band. Their studio was in Elmira, Ontario, between 1973 and 1980. They also started their own Record Label, MBS (Mercey Brothers Sound) during this period. MBS signed on names such as Terry Carisse, Marie Bottrell, and Joan Kennedy.

== Discography ==
=== Albums ===
Year	Album	Chart Positions	
Year	Album	CAN Country	CAN
1968	Mercey Brothers	—	—
1969	My Song for You	—	—
1970	Mercey Brothers	—	—
1970	Naturally	—	—
1971	Have Mercey	—	68
1972	Mercey Brothers Country	—	—
1973	Mercey Brothers	—	—
1975	Did You Hear My Song	—	—
1975	Best of the Mercey Brothers	—	—
1976	Homemade	—	—
1976	Mercey Brothers Radio Show	—	—
1977	Comin' on Stronger	4	—
1980	Command Performance	—	—
1982	Mercey Brothers	—	—
1984	Latest and Greatest Volume 1	26	—
1985	Love Is the Reason	—	—
1988	Latest and Greatest Volume 2	—	—
1990	30 Greatest: Their Hits and More	—	—

=== Singles ===
Year	Title	Peak chart positions			Album
Year	Title	CAN Country	CAN AC	CAN	Album
1966	"Whistle on the River"	1	—	—	The Mercey Brothers (1968)
1967	"Uncle Tom"	1	—	—	The Mercey Brothers (1968)
1968	"Absent Minded Me"	27	—	—	The Mercey Brothers (1968)
1969	"Who Drinks My Beer When I'm Gone"	1	—	—	My Song for You
1969	"Ordinary Peeping Tom"	3	—	—	My Song for You
1970	"My Song for You"	2	—	—	My Song for You
1970	"Goodbye"	—	—	75	My Song for You
1970	"Pickin' Up the Pieces"	4	—	—	My Song for You
1970	"Old Bill Jones"	1	18	—	The Mercey Brothers (1970)
1971	"Knocking Down the Hard Times"	36	26	—	The Mercey Brothers (1970)
1971	"Hello Mom"	1	1	36	Have Mercey
1971	"Who Wrote the Words"	1	1	—	Have Mercey
1971	"The Day of Love"	35	20	—	Non-album song
1972	"Kentucky Turn Your Back"	3	3	—	Mercey Brothers Country
1972	"The Day of Love" (re-release)	41	33	—	Non-album song
1973	"It's So Easy to Please Me"	4	—	—	Mercey Brothers Country
1973	"Meant to Be with Me"	19	39	—	The Mercey Brothers (1973)
1973	"Our Loving Times"	6	—	—	The Mercey Brothers (1973)
1974	"I Heard Bells"	—	21	—	The Mercey Brothers (1973)
1974	"California Lady"	—	25	77	Did You Hear My Song
1975	"Did You Hear My Song"	9	—	—	Did You Hear My Song
1976	"Lovin' You from a Distance"	12	19	—	Homemade
1976	"Old Loves Never Die"	20	41	—	Homemade
1976	"If I Believed in Myself"	18	23	—	Homemade
1977	"Jamie"	20	—	—	Homemade
1977	"You Know It Felt Good"	23	—	—	Homemade
1978	"Home Along the Highway"	31	—	—	Comin' on Stronger
1978	"Comin' on Stronger"	10	—	—	Comin' on Stronger
1979	"Stranger"	9	—	—	Comin' on Stronger
1979	"Hell Bent for Mexico"	13	—	—	Command Performance
1979	"I Wish You Could Have Turned My Head"	15	—	—	Command Performance
1980	"Your Eyes Don't Lie to Me"	27	—	—	Command Performance
1980	"Makin' the Night the Best Part of My Day"	48	—	—	Command Performance
1981	"Sweet Harmony"	20	22	—	Command Performance
1981	"The Same Eyes That Always Drove Me Crazy"	24	—	—	The Mercey Brothers (1982)
1982	"Maybe It's Love This Time"	8	—	—	The Mercey Brothers (1982)
1982	"I've Already Left You (In My Mind)"	12	—	—	The Mercey Brothers (1982)
1983	"The Day That You Walked In"	29	—	—	The Mercey Brothers (1982)
1983	"Anytime Down"	32	—	—	The Mercey Brothers (1982)
1984	"Leader of the Band"	9	21	—	Latest and Greatest Volume 1
1984	"Love at Last Sight"	8	—	—	Love Is the Reason
1985	"You Lifted Me High Enough"	10	—	—	Love Is the Reason
1985	"Love Is the Reason"	7	13	—	Love Is the Reason
1986	"Take a Little Chance on Love"	6	—	—	Love Is the Reason
1986	"Pretty Diamond Ring"	8	—	—	Love Is the Reason
1987	"Heroes"	9	—	—	Love Is the Reason
1987	"Raised by the Radio"	8	—	—	Latest and Greatest Volume 2
1988	"Straight to Your Heart"	14	—	—	Latest and Greatest Volume 2
