= My Life (Throw It Away If I Want To) =

"My Life (Throw it Away If I Want To)"

Single by Bill Anderson

from the album My Life/But You Know I Love You
- B-side: "To Be Alone"
- Released: February 1969 (U.S.)
- Recorded: 1969
- Genre: Country
- Length: 2:44
- Label: Decca
- Songwriter: Bill Anderson
- Producer: Owen Bradley

Bill Anderson singles chronology
"Happy State of Mind" (1968)	"My Life (Throw it Away If I Want To)" (1969)	"But You Know I Love You" (1969)

"My Life (Throw it Away If I Want To)" is an American country music song written and recorded by Bill Anderson.

== Release and reception ==
Upon its release, Billboard noted that the song was a "compelling, original rhythm ballad" and a "strong entry."

== Chart performance ==
Originally released in February 1969, "My Life" became Anderson's fourth solo No. 1 song on the Billboard Hot Country Singles chart on May 17, 1969. It spent two weeks atop that chart and charted for 19 weeks total, and was ultimately named Billboard's No. 1 country song of 1969.

Chart (1969)	Peak position
U.S. Billboard Hot Country Singles	1
Canadian RPM Country Tracks	2
