= To Make Love Sweeter for You =

Single by Jerry Lee Lewis

from the album She Still Comes Around
- B-side: "Let's Talk About Us"
- Released: November 1968
- Genre: Country
- Label: Smash
- Songwriter(s): Jerry Kennedy, Glenn Sutton
- Producer(s): Jerry Kennedy

Jerry Lee Lewis singles chronology
"She Still Comes Around (to Love What's Left of Me)" (1968)	"To Make Love Sweeter for You" (1968)	"Don't Let Me Cross Over" (1969)

"To Make Love Sweeter For You" is a song written by Jerry Kennedy and Glenn Sutton and performed by Jerry Lee Lewis. The song was Jerry Lee Lewis' third number one on the country chart and his first since "Great Balls of Fire" in 1958. "To Make Love Sweeter For You" stayed at number one for a single week and spent a total of thirteen weeks on the country chart.

== Chart performance ==
Chart (1968–1969)	Peak position
U.S. Billboard Hot Country Singles	1
Canadian RPM Country Tracks	4
