= To See My Angel Cry =

- Singapore release picture sleeve

Single by Conway Twitty

from the album To See My Angel Cry
- B-side: "I Did the Best I Could"
- Released: August 18, 1969
- Recorded: June 24, 1969
- Studio: Bradley's Barn, Mt. Juliet, Tennessee
- Genre: Country
- Length: 2:42
- Label: Decca
- Songwriters: Conway Twitty; L. E. White; Carlton Haney
- Producer: Owen Bradley

Conway Twitty singles chronology
| "I Love You More Today" (1969) | "To See My Angel Cry" (1969) | "That's When She Started to Stop Loving You" (1969) |

"To See My Angel Cry" is a song co-written and recorded by American country music artist Conway Twitty.

== Recording and Release ==
Twitty recorded the song at Bradley's Barn studio Mt. Juliet, Tennessee, on June 24, 1969, the same day he cut "That's When She Started to Stop Loving You". It was released in August 1969 as the first single and title track from the album To See My Angel Cry. The song was Twitty's third number one on the country charts. The single spent a single week at number one and a total of 13 weeks on the country chart. It was written by Twitty, L. E. White and Carlton Haney.

== Personnel ==
- Conway Twitty — vocals
- Joe E. Lewis, The Jordanaires — background vocals
- Harold Bradley — electric 6-string bass guitar
- Grady Martin — electric guitar
- Larry Butler — piano
- Ray Edenton — acoustic guitar
- John Hughey — steel guitar
- Tommy Markham — drums and percussion
- Bob Moore — bass
- Herman Wade — electric guitar

== Chart performance ==
| Chart (1969) | Peak position |
|---|---|
| US Hot Country Songs (Billboard) | 1 |
| Canadian RPM Country Tracks | 1 |
