= I Love You More Today =

Single by Conway Twitty

from the album I Love You More Today
- B-side: "Bad Girl"
- Released: April 14, 1969
- Genre: Country
- Length: 2:33
- Label: Decca
- Songwriter(s): L. E. White
- Producer(s): Owen Bradley

Conway Twitty singles chronology
"Darling You Know I Wouldn't Lie" (1968)	"I Love You More Today" (1969)	"To See My Angel Cry" (1969)

"I Love You More Today" is a song written by L. E. White, and recorded by American country music artist Conway Twitty. It was released in April 1969 as the first single and title track from the album I Love You More Today. The song was Twitty's second number one on the country charts. The single spent a single week at the top and a total of 15 weeks on the country chart.

== Chart performance ==
Chart (1969)	Peak position
US Hot Country Songs (Billboard)	1
Canadian RPM Country Tracks	2
