= The Name of the Game Was Love =

Single by Hank Snow

from the album Hits Covered by Snow
- B-side: "Gypsy and Me"
- Released: 1968
- Recorded: 1968
- Genre: Country
- Length: 2:14
- Label: RCA Records
- Songwriter(s): Cy Coben

Hank Snow singles chronology
"The Late and Great Love of My Heart" (1968)	"The Name of the Game Was Love" (1968)	"That's When the Hurtin' Sets In" (1969)

"The Name of the Game Was Love" is a single by Canadian country music artist Hank Snow. It was written by Cy Coben. The song peaked at number 1 on the RPM Country Tracks chart. It also reached number 16 on the Billboard Hot Country Singles chart in the United States.

The song is a tongue-twister in the same vein as Snow's earlier hit I've Been Everywhere. In the lyrics, the narrator finds an old address book that listed all the girls he dated. He then begins reciting the names of all the girls.

== Chart performance ==
Chart (1969)	Peak position
Canadian RPM Country Tracks	1
U.S. Billboard Hot Country Singles	16
