= Wild Week-End =

Single by Bill Anderson

from the album Wild Weekend
- B-side: "Fun While It Lasted"
- Released: March 1968
- Genre: Country
- Length: 2:22
- Label: Decca
- Songwriter: Bill Anderson

Bill Anderson singles chronology
"Stranger on the Run" (1967)	"Wild Week-End" (1968)	"Happy State of Mind" (1968)

"Wild Week-End" is a single by American country music artist Bill Anderson. Released in March 1968, it was the first single from his album Wild Weekend. The song peaked at number 2 on the Billboard Hot Country Singles chart. It also reached number 1 on the RPM Country Tracks chart in Canada.

== Chart performance ==
Chart (1968)	Peak position
U.S. Billboard Hot Country Singles	2
Canadian RPM Country Tracks	1
