= Tall Dark Stranger =

Single by Buck Owens

from the album Tall Dark Stranger
- B-side: "Sing That Kind of a Song"
- Released: July 21, 1969
- Genre: Country
- Label: Capitol
- Songwriter: Buck Owens
- Producer: Ken Nelson

Buck Owens singles chronology
"Johnny B. Goode" (1969)	"Tall Dark Stranger" (1969)	"Big in Vegas" (1969)

"Tall Dark Stranger" is a song written and recorded by Buck Owens, released as a single in 1969. "Tall Dark Stranger" was Buck Owens' twentieth number one on the country chart, spending one week at the top and a total of thirteen weeks on the charts.

== Chart performance ==
Chart (1969)	Peak position
U.S. Billboard Hot Country Singles	1
Canadian RPM Country Tracks	1

== Music video ==
A video for the song was taped for the TV series Hee Haw, on which Owens was a co-host. The video is set in a wild west town, and during the musical bridge the song's main theme – a handsome stranger, tall and dressed in black clothing, stealing the heart of a young man's girlfriend and the woman riding off with him – is played out, said incident happening as Owens (cast as the protagonist) and the woman are walking out of a saloon. The video has since aired on Great American Country and CMT.
