= The Ways to Love a Man (song) =

- Japanese release picture sleeve

Single by Tammy Wynette

from the album The Ways to Love a Man
- B-side: "Still Around"
- Released: July 1969
- Studio: Columbia Studio B (Nashville, Tennessee)
- Genre: Country
- Label: Epic
- Songwriter(s): Tammy Wynette; Billy Sherrill; Glenn Sutton
- Producer(s): Billy Sherrill

Tammy Wynette singles chronology
"Singing My Song" (1969)	"The Ways to Love a Man" (1969)	"I'll See Him Through" (1969)

"The Ways to Love a Man" is a 1969 single by Tammy Wynette, who co-wrote the song with Billy Sherrill and Glenn Sutton. It was Wynette's sixth number one on the U.S. country singles chart. The single reached the top of the chart for two weeks and stayed on the chart for fifteen weeks.

== Chart performance ==
Chart (1969)	Peak position
U.S. Billboard Hot Country Singles	1
U.S. Billboard Hot 100	81
U.S. Billboard Easy Listening	18
Canadian RPM Country Tracks	1
Canadian RPM Top Singles	78
Canadian RPM Adult Contemporary Tracks	33
