= Who's Gonna Mow Your Grass =

- Norwegian release picture sleeve

Single by Buck Owens
- B-side: "There's Gotta Be Some Changes Made"
- Released: January 13, 1969
- Genre: Country rock
- Length: 2:25
- Label: Capitol
- Songwriter(s): Buck Owens
- Producer(s): Ken Nelson

Buck Owens singles chronology
"Things I Saw Happening at the Fountain" (1968)	"Who's Gonna Mow Your Grass" (1969)	"Johnny B. Goode" (1969)

"Who's Gonna Mow Your Grass" is a 1969 single written and recorded by Buck Owens. "Who's Gonna Mow Your Grass" was a number one song on the country charts. The single stayed at number one for two weeks and spent a total of fourteen weeks on the country charts.

== Content ==
The song features an example of fuzztone in country music (found on the album version, but mostly missing on the single version). Its lyrics are about a man who "hopes to regain favor with a fickle sweetheart by reminding her about all the menial chores he willingly performs."

== Chart performance ==
Chart (1969)	Peak position
U.S. Billboard Hot Country Singles	1
U.S. Billboard Bubbling Under Hot 100	6
Canadian RPM Country Tracks	1
