= Singing My Song =

Single by Tammy Wynette

from the album Tammy's Greatest Hits
- B-side: "Too Far Gone"
- Released: March 1969
- Genre: Country
- Label: Epic
- Songwriter(s): Tammy Wynette; Billy Sherrill; Glenn Sutton
- Producer(s): Billy Sherrill

Tammy Wynette singles chronology
"Stand by Your Man" (1968)	"Singing My Song" (1969)	"The Ways to Love a Man" (1969)

"Singing My Song" is a song recorded by American country music artist Tammy Wynette, who co-wrote the song with Billy Sherrill and Glenn Sutton. It was released in March 1969 as the first single from her compilation album Tammy's Greatest Hits. The song was Wynette's fifth number one on the country charts as a solo artist. The single spent two weeks at number one and a total of fourteen weeks on the charts.

== Chart performance ==
Chart (1969)	Peak position
US Hot Country Songs (Billboard)	1
U.S. Billboard Hot 100	75
Canadian RPM Country Tracks	1
Canadian RPM Top Singles	65
Canadian RPM Adult Contemporary Tracks	35

== Cover versions ==
- In 1970, Vikki Carr peaked at number thirty on the Easy Listening chart with her recording of the song.
