= My Fingers Do the Talkin' =

My Fingers Do The Talkin'

Studio album by Jerry Lee Lewis
- Released: January 1983
- Studio: Woodland (Nashville, Tennessee)
- Genre: Country, rock
- Label: MCA
- Producer: Ron Chancey

Jerry Lee Lewis chronology
The Survivors Live (1982)	My Fingers Do The Talkin' (1983)	I Am What I Am (1984)

My Fingers Do The Talkin' is a studio album by American musician and pianist Jerry Lee Lewis, released in January 1983. His first of two albums for MCA, the album peaked at No. 62 on Billboard's Top Country Albums chart.

== Recording ==
After breaking up with Elektra, Lewis moved to MCA to record two albums in the early 1980s. My Fingers Do The Talkin' was Jerry Lee's last solo studio album to make its way into Billboard's Top Country Albums chart until Last Man Standing revived his career in 2006. It offers a similar mix of rock ‘n roll and country songs as the albums he made for Elektra, containing material from many familiar songwriters, including Sonny Throckmorton, and Mack Vickery. The album delivered his last three singles to hit the US country charts, with the title song reaching #44 obtaining lukewarm (2.5/5 and 3.67/5) ratings at the AllMusic and Discogs platforms

The album was created during a turbulent period in Lewis' career. He struggled with the Internal Revenue Service, his fourth wife drowned in 1982 and his fifth wife died in 1983 within three months of their marriage. The latter death resulting in rumours of murder.

== Track listing ==
1. "My Fingers Do The Talkin'" (Bill Taylor – Buck Moore)
2. "She Sure Makes Leaving Look Easy" (Sonny Throckmorton)
3. "Why You Been Gone So Long" (Mickey Newbury)
4. "She Sings Amazing Grace" (Bill Rice, Jerry Foster)
5. "Better Not Look Down" (Joe Sample, Will Jennings)
6. "Honky Tonk Rock And Roll Piano Man" (Steve Collom)
7. "Come As You Were" (Paul Craft)
8. "Circumstantial Evidence" (Fred Koller)
9. "Forever Forgiving" (Mack Vickery)
10. "Honky Tonk Heaven" (Larry Henley, Billy Burnette)

== Personnel ==
- Jerry Lee Lewis – vocals, keyboards
- Shane Keister – keyboards
- Kenny Lovelace – electric guitar, acoustic guitar, fiddle
- Billy Sanford – electric guitar, mandolin
- Jerry Shook – electric guitar, acoustic guitar
- James Capps – acoustic guitar
- Joe Osborn, Jack Williams – bass
- Gene Chrisman – drums, percussion
- Harvey Thompson, Ronald Eades, Charles Rose, Harrison Calloway – Muscle Shoals Horns
- Lea Jane Berinati, Donna McElroy, Yvonne Hodges, Shri Huffman, Diane Tidwell, Lisa Silver, Karen Taylor, Judy Rodman, Donna Sheridon – backing vocals
