= Class of '55: Memphis Rock & Roll Homecoming =

Studio album by Roy Orbison, Johnny Cash, Jerry Lee Lewis, and Carl Perkins
- Released: May 26, 1986
- Recorded: September 17–20, 1985
- Studios: Sun Studio (Memphis, Tennessee); American Studio (Memphis, Tennessee)
- Genres: Country; rockabilly; rock and roll; gospel
- Length: 37:14
- Label: America/Smash
- Producer: Chips Moman

Roy Orbison chronology
Laminar Flow (1979)	Class of '55: Memphis Rock & Roll Homecoming (1986)	In Dreams: The Greatest Hits (1987)

Johnny Cash chronology
Heroes (1986)	Class of '55: Memphis Rock & Roll Homecoming (1986)	Believe in Him (1986)

Jerry Lee Lewis chronology
I Am What I Am (1984)	Class of '55: Memphis Rock & Roll Homecoming (1986)	Young Blood (1995)

Carl Perkins chronology
Carl Perkins (1985)	Class of ‘55: Memphis Rock & Roll Homecoming (1986)	Original Sun Greatest Hits (1996)

Singles from Class of '55: Memphis Rock & Roll Homecoming
- 1. "Birth of Rock and Roll" / "Rock and Roll (Fais-Do-Do)" Released: July 1986

Class of '55: Memphis Rock & Roll Homecoming is a collaborative studio album by Roy Orbison, Johnny Cash, Jerry Lee Lewis, and Carl Perkins. It was released on May 26, 1986, by America/Smash Records, a subsidiary of Polygram Records. The album was produced by Chips Moman.

While the album was in part a tribute to Elvis Presley, it was mainly a commemoration of those young performing hopefuls, the four album participants, who — as had Presley — all began their careers with Sun Records in the 1950s. Recorded at Sam Phillips’ Sun Studios and completed at American Sound Studios, the album was documented by Dick Clark Productions, which filmed it from start to finish; by The Commercial Appeal, the Mid-South's largest circulation newspaper; and by Nine-O-One Network Magazine, the first edition of which was sold with the album in a telemarketing package.

The final song of the session, "Big Train (from Memphis)", written by John Fogerty, includes the blended voices of John Fogerty, The Judds, Dave Edmunds, Ricky Nelson, Sam Phillips, and June Carter Cash. Fogerty told a reporter that he was thinking about the old Sun Records sound when he wrote the song. The extended finale of the song features the singers singing lines from various Sun Records songs, including "That's All Right Mama", "Blue Suede Shoes," "Whole Lotta Shakin' Goin' On", "Folsom Prison Blues" and others.

Producer Chips Moman encountered a major issue following the recording sessions, as Cash was still under contract to Columbia Records at the time and proper permissions had not been obtained. Faced with the possibility of having to remove Cash's voice from the recordings, Moman paid Columbia $100,000 for the rights to keep Cash on the record. At this time, the America/Smash label was affiliated with PolyGram, which in turn also owned Mercury Records to which Cash would sign shortly after recording Class of '55.

The recorded "Interviews from the Class of '55 Recording Sessions," written and produced by Rose Clayton, earned the 1986 Grammy Award for Best Spoken Word Album for the four performers, plus for producer Chips Moman, Sam Phillips and Ricky Nelson. For Nelson, it was his last recording session and only Grammy Award of his career.

A music video from Perkins' "Birth of Rock and Roll," starring Perkins, Lewis, and Ron Wood of The Rolling Stones, promoted the "Class of '55."

Cash, Lewis and Perkins had previously collaborated in 1956 with the Million Dollar Quartet and in 1982 with The Survivors Live.

Dick Clark hosted a TV special with footage of the studio sessions aired on TBS in 1989.

After being out of print for decades, the album was re-released separately and as part of the Cash box set “The Complete Mercury Recordings: 1986-1991.”

== Reception ==
Professional ratings
Review scores
Source	Rating
Allmusic	3/5 stars
The Encyclopedia of Popular Music	3/5 stars
MusicHound	3/5 stars

Steve Huey of AllMusic said it "include renditions of Perkins' "Birth of Rock and Roll," "Sixteen Candles," Waylon Jennings' "Waymore's Blues," Cash's "I Will Rock and Roll With You," and John Fogerty's "Big Train (From Memphis)."

Billboard selected the album for a "Country Spotlight" review, and stated that "The songs effectively blend standards with worshipful derivatives"

== Track listing ==
Side one
No.	Title	Writer(s)	Artist(s)	Length
1.	"Birth of Rock and Roll"	Carl Perkins, Greg Perkins	Carl Perkins	4:21
2.	"Sixteen Candles"	Luther Dixon, Allyson Khent	Jerry Lee Lewis	3:48
3.	"Class of '55"	Chips Moman, Bobby Emmons	Carl Perkins	2:56
4.	"Waymore's Blues"	Waylon Jennings, Curtis Buck	Perkins, Lewis, Orbison & Cash	2:25
5.	"We Remember the King"	Paul Kennerley	Johnny Cash	2:58

Side two
No.	Title	Writer(s)	Artist(s)	Length
1.	"Coming Home"	Roy Orbison, Will Jennings, JD Souther	Roy Orbison	3:59
2.	"Rock and Roll (Fais-Do-Do)"	Michael Smotherman	Perkins, Lewis, Orbison & Cash	3:17
3.	"Keep My Motor Running"	Randy Bachman	Jerry Lee Lewis	2:52
4.	"I Will Rock and Roll with You"	Johnny Cash	Johnny Cash	2:01
5.	"Big Train (from Memphis)"	John Fogerty	Perkins, Lewis, Orbison & Cash	7:56

== Personnel ==
- Johnny Cash — vocals, rhythm guitar
- Carl Perkins — vocals, rhythm guitar, lead guitar
- Jerry Lee Lewis — vocals, piano
- Roy Orbison — vocals, acoustic guitar
- Jack Clement, Marty Stuart — backing vocals, guitar
- Reggie Young, Bob Wootton, Kenny Lovelace, J. R. Cobb — guitar
- Memphis Strings — strings
- Ace Cannon, Wayne Jackson, Jack Hale, Jr., Bob Lewin — horns
- Bobby Emmons — keyboards, Synclavier
- Bobby Wood — Keyboard
- Mike Leech, Bob Moore — bass
- Gene Chrisman, WS Holland, Buddy Harman — drums
- Toni Wine, Paul Davis, Dan Penn, Rebecca Evans, Reba Russell — backing vocals
- Sam Philips, Rick Nelson, June Carter Cash, John Fogerty, Dave Edmunds, The Judds — backing vocals on "Big Train (From Memphis)"
- Chips Moman — backing vocals, producer

== Charts ==
Album - Billboard (United States)

Chart (1986)	Peak position
Top Country Albums	15
Billboard 200	87
