= Boogie Woogie Country Man =

Studio album by Jerry Lee Lewis
- Released: 1975
- Recorded: Nashville, Tennessee
- Genre: Country, gospel
- Length: 28:55
- Label: Mercury
- Producer: Jerry Kennedy

Jerry Lee Lewis chronology
I-40 Country (1974)	Boogie Woogie Country Man (1975)	Odd Man In (1975)

Boogie Woogie Country Man is a studio album by American musician and pianist Jerry Lee Lewis, released on Mercury Records in 1975.

== Recording ==
Boogie Woogie Country Man was a return of sorts to the more "hardcore" honky-tonk country albums that Lewis had recorded in the late sixties and early seventies, although producer Jerry Kennedy retained the background singers to sweeten Jerry Lee's increasingly slurred rasp. The heavy-handed "countrypolitan" production that had drenched albums like 1972's Who's Gonna Play This Old Piano...Think About It, Darlin' and 1973's Sometimes a Memory Ain't Enough is scaled back to an extent as Lewis rocks it up on the title track and turns in typically soulful performances on "I'm Still Jealous of You" and Tom T. Hall's "Red Hot Memories (Ice Cold Beer)". Lewis flaunts his notorious hard-living reputation on another Hall tune, "I Can Still Hear the Music in the Restroom", where Lewis confesses to snorting blow before lying stupefied drunk on a washroom floor. The song, released as a single, failed to reach the top ten, and the title track fared worse, peaking at number 24. "You can only have so many hit records," he told biographer Rick Bragg in 2014, "and record so many, and do 'em different every time, every time, every time, you know?"

== Reception ==
The album rose to number 16 on the Billboard country albums chart. Bruce Eder of AllMusic said, "This album presents Jerry Lee Lewis in a surprisingly laid-back mode, doing ballads and gospel in what, for him, is almost a reflective manner. Some of the songs are downright cautionary, and he is amazingly effective on songs such as 'Jesus Is on the Mainline'."

== Track listing ==
No.	Title	Writer(s)	Length
1.	"I'm Still Jealous of You"	Jerry Foster; Bill Rice	3:08
2.	"Little Peace and Harmony"	Ray Griff	2:23
3.	"Jesus Is on the Main Line (Call Him Sometime)"	Marijohn Wilkin	2:09
4.	"Forever Forgiving"	Mack Vickery	2:14
5.	"(Remember Me) I'm the One You Loves You"	Stuart Hamblen	2:55
6.	"Red Hot Memories (Ice Cold Beer)"	Tom T. Hall	2:15
7.	"I Can Still Hear the Music In the Restroom"	Tom T. Hall	2:32
8.	"Love Inflation"	Sanger D. Schafer	2:43
9.	"I Was Sorta Wonderin'"	Bill Kearns; Moon Mullican; Dusty Ward	2:37
10.	"Thanks for Nothing"	Rayburn Anthony; Gene Dobbins	2:15
11.	"Boogie Woogie Country Man"	Troy Seals	3:44
Total length:			28:55

== Personnel ==
- Jerry Lee Lewis – lead vocals, piano
- The Jordanaires, Millie Kirkham, Trish Williams – backing vocals
- Bob Moore – double bass
- Buddy Harman – drums
- Kenny Lovelace – fiddle
- Tommy Allsup, Harold Bradley, Johnny Christopher, Ray Edenton, Billy Sanford, Jerry Shook, Pete Wade, Chip Young – guitar
- Charlie McCoy – harmonica, vibraphone
- Hargus "Pig" Robbins – Hammond organ
- Pete Drake, Lloyd Green – steel guitar
