= Odd Man In =

Studio album by Jerry Lee Lewis
- Released: 1975
- Recorded: Nashville, Tennessee
- Genre: Country
- Label: Mercury
- Producer: Jerry Kennedy

Jerry Lee Lewis chronology
Boogie Woogie Country Man (1975)	Odd Man In (1975)	Country Class (1976)

Odd Man In is the thirty-first studio album by American musician and pianist Jerry Lee Lewis, released in 1975 on the Mercury label. The album title was credited to Joanie Lawrence.

== Track listing ==
1. "Don't Boogie Woogie (When You Say Your Prayers Tonight)" (Layng Martine Jr.)
2. "Shake, Rattle & Roll" (Charles E. Calhoun)
3. "You Ought to See My Mind" (Carl Knight)
4. "I Don't Want to Be Lonely Tonight" (Baker Knight)
5. "That Kind of Fool" (Mack Vickery)
6. "Goodnight Irene" (Huddie Ledbetter, Alan A. Lomax)
7. "A Damn Good Country Song" (Donnie Fritts)
8. "Jerry's Place" (Ray Griff)
9. "When I Take My Vacation to Heaven" (Herbert Buffum)
10. "Crawdad Song" (Traditional; arranged by Jerry Lee Lewis)
11. "Your Cheatin' Heart" (Hank Williams)

== Personnel ==
- Jerry Lee Lewis - vocals, piano
- Billy Sanford, Chip Young, Don McMinn, Harold Bradley, Jerry Shook, Johnny Christopher, Pete Wade, Ray Edenton, Tommy Allsup - guitar
- Lloyd Green, Pete Drake - steel guitar
- Kenny Lovelace - fiddle
- Bob Moore, Mike Leech - bass
- Hargus "Pig" Robbins - piano, organ
- Buddy Harman - drums
- Millie Kirkham, Priscilla Hubbard, Trish Williams - vocal accompaniment
- The Jordanaires (Gordon Stoker, Hoyt Hawkins, Neal Matthews, Ray Walker) - vocal accompaniment

Technical

- Larry Rogers, Tom Sparkman - engineer
- Knox Phillips - vocal overdub supervision
- David Deahl - cover photography
