= Southern Roots: Back Home to Memphis =

Southern Roots: Back Home in Memphis

Studio album by Jerry Lee Lewis
- Released: 1973
- Recorded: Trans-Maximus Studios, Memphis, Tennessee
- Genre: Rock, soul, gospel
- Label: Mercury
- Producer: Huey P. Meaux

Jerry Lee Lewis chronology
Sometimes a Memory Ain't Enough (1973)	Southern Roots: Back Home in Memphis (1973)	I-40 Country (1974)

Southern Roots: Back Home in Memphis is a studio album by American musician and pianist Jerry Lee Lewis, released on Mercury Records in 1973.

== Background ==
Southern Roots: Back Home in Memphis was touted as a "comeback" album for Lewis, which was misleading at best; Lewis had been enjoying enormous success on the country music charts since 1968, scoring 15 top 10 hits (including four chart toppers) and selling out concerts on the road. In addition, although the title implies a return to his rock and roll roots, Lewis had enjoyed his highest pop charting album since 1973 with The Session...Recorded in London with Great Artists, a collaboration with British rockers that had been released earlier in the year and had reached number 37. His singles "Me and Bobby McGee" had also grazed the top 40 (peaking at #40, 1972). As Stephen Thomas Erlewine of AllMusic observed, "Apart from the gospel closer, the country has been consciously removed from the menu, a move that feels like the producer's choice, since Lewis' performances aren't all that much different or more impassioned than what came before...Jerry Lee doesn't sound relieved to be in this setting; he simply sounds like himself, barrelling through a set of songs as he twists them to suit his needs."

== Recording and reception ==
Produced by Huey Meaux, a fellow Louisiana wild man who had just recently gotten out of prison, the sessions commenced in September 1973, which would go on to be a hellish year for Lewis; he was jailed and fined for driving while intoxicated and, just after his release, his son Jerry Lee Lewis, Jr. was killed when a car he was towing jackknifed and hit the abutment of a bridge near Hernando, Mississippi. Three weeks later, Lewis's fourth wife, Jaren, filed for divorce. According to Rick Bragg's authorized biography Jerry Lee Lewis: His Own Story, Lewis was in a foul mood when he showed up at Trans Maximus Studios in Memphis to record: "During these sessions, he insulted the producer, threatened to kill a photographer, and drank and medicated his way into but not out of a fog." During one exchange that can be heard on the 2013 reissue Southern Roots: The Original Sessions, Meaux asks Lewis, "Do you wanna try one?", meaning a take, to which Lewis replies "If you got enough fuckin' sense to cut it." Recorded over three days, the album displays a heavy soul influence, with Lewis receiving support from Stax Records alumni Steve Cropper, Al Jackson, Jr. and Donald "Duck" Dunn, fellow rock and roll icon Carl Perkins, Tony Joe White and the Memphis Horns, but a single, the overtly lascivious "Meat Man," did not crack either the pop or country charts. (In his essay for the box set Mercury Smashes...and Rockin' Sessions, Colin Escott calls "Meat Man" "so wonderfully lewd" that Lewis was the "only person in country music who would even have considered cutting it.")

Affecting a Southern drawl in his review in The Pittsburgh Press, critic Pete Bishop lamented that Southern Roots was "chock full of backup trumpets, saxes, singers and Lordy knows what else--and Jerry Lee, ole buddy, y'all don't need all that." Bishop termed the album "a right big disappointment." Southern Roots did make the Billboard country albums chart, peaking at number 6. The album garnered Lewis a lot of publicity and good will, and he remained a huge in-demand performer, appearing on the ABC series In Concert and the now classic late-night TV series The Midnight Special. As recounted in Bragg's 2014 biography, when Lewis played the Roxy in Los Angeles a month.

== Track listing ==
1. "Meat Man" (Mack Vickery)
2. "When a Man Loves a Woman" (Calvin Lewis, Andrew Wright)
3. "Hold On! I'm Comin'" (Isaac Hayes, David Porter)
4. "Just a Little Bit" (Rosco Gordon)
5. "Born to Be a Loser" (Karen Carpenter, Richard Carpenter)
6. "The Haunted House" (Bob Geddins)
7. "Blueberry Hill" (Al Lewis, Vincent Rose, Larry Stock)
8. "The Revolutionary Man" (Doug Sahm)
9. "Big Blue Diamonds" (Kit Carson)
10. "That Old Bourbon Street Church" (Mack Vickery)

== Personnel ==
- Jerry Lee Lewis - vocals, piano
- Tony Joe White, Carl Perkins, James Tarbutton, Kenny Lovelace, Paul Cannon, Steve Cropper - guitar
- Charles Owens - steel guitar
- Donald Dunn, Herman "Hawk" Hawkins, Tommy Cathey - bass
- J.L. "Marty" Morrison - organ
- Augie Meyers - Vox organ
- Al Jackson Jr., Joel Williams, Robert "Tarp" Tarrant - drums
- Jerry Lee Lewis, Jr. - percussion
- Mack Vickery - harmonica
- Bill Taylor, Mark Lindsay (ex. Paul Revere & the Raiders, saxophone), Russ Carlton - horns
- Memphis Horns: Andrew Love, Ed Logan, Jack Hale, James Mitchell, Wayne Jackson - horns
- Sugar Sweets - backing vocals
