= Jerry Lee Lewis (1979 album) =

Studio album by Jerry Lee Lewis
- Released: August 17, 1979
- Recorded: 4–7 January 1979
- Studio: Filmways/Heider Recording, Hollywood, Los Angeles, California
- Genre: Country; Rock and roll
- Label: Elektra
- Producer: Bones Howe

Jerry Lee Lewis chronology
| Jerry Lee Keeps Rockin' (1978) | Jerry Lee Lewis (1979) | When Two Worlds Collide (1980) |

Jerry Lee Lewis is a studio album by American singer and pianist Jerry Lee Lewis, released by Elektra Records in 1979.

== Reception ==
Professional ratings
Review scores
| Source | Rating |
|---|---|
| Christgau's Record Guide | B+ |
| The Rolling Stone Album Guide | 3/5 stars |

Jerry Lee Lewis was acclaimed critically but was not a commercial success, peaking at number 23 on the Billboard country albums chart and limping to number 186 on the Top 200. The New York Times wrote that "what justifies the disk is Mr. Lewis's singing, which recalls the rave-up frenzies of his youth and blends the still-exciting edge with a confident maturity and stylishness of phrasing."

== Track listing ==
1. "Don't Let Go" (Jesse Stone)
2. "Rita May" (Bob Dylan, Jacques Levy)
3. "Every Day I Have to Cry" (Arthur Alexander)
4. "I Like It Like That" (Allen Toussaint, Chris Kenner)
5. "Number One Lovin' Man" (Jim Cottengim)
6. "Rockin' My Life Away" (Mack Vickery)
7. "Who Will the Next Fool Be" (Charlie Rich)
8. "(You've Got) Personality" (Harold Logan, Lloyd Price)
9. "I Wish I Was Eighteen Again" (Sonny Throckmorton)
10. "Rocking Little Angel" (Jimmie Rogers)

== Personnel ==
- Jerry Lee Lewis - vocals, piano
- James Burton - electric guitar, dobro
- Kenny Lovelace - acoustic & electric guitar, violin
- Tim May - acoustic & electric guitar
- Dave Parlato - bass
- Hal Blaine - drums, percussion
- Ron Hicklin Singers - backing vocals
- Bob Alcivar - string arrangements, conductor
