= Million Dollar Quartet =

1956 recording of Elvis Presley, Jerry Lee Lewis, Carl Perkins and Johnny Cash

- Famous photograph taken during the recording session. L-R: Jerry Lee Lewis, Carl Perkins, Elvis Presley and Johnny Cash

Background information
- Genres: Rock and roll; rockabilly; blues; country; gospel
- Years active: 1956 (original Million Dollar Quartet session); 1977 (Johnny Cash Christmas television special); 1981 (as The Survivors); 1985 (as Class of '55)
- Past members: Johnny Cash; Jerry Lee Lewis; Elvis Presley; Carl Perkins; Roy Orbison

"Million Dollar Quartet" is a recording of an impromptu jam session involving Elvis Presley, Jerry Lee Lewis, Carl Perkins and Johnny Cash made on December 4, 1956 at the Sun Record Studios in Memphis, Tennessee. An article about the session was published in the Memphis Press-Scimitar under the title "Million Dollar Quartet". The recording was first released in Europe in 1981 as The Million Dollar Quartet with 17 tracks. A few years later more tracks were discovered and released as The Complete Million Dollar Session. In 1990, the recordings were released in the United States as Elvis Presley: The Million Dollar Quartet. This session is considered a seminal moment in rock and roll history.

== Recording session ==
The jam session seems to have happened by pure chance. Perkins, who by this time had already met success with "Blue Suede Shoes", had come into the studios that day accompanied by his brothers Clayton and Jay and by drummer W. S. Holland, their aim being to record some new material, including a revamped version of an old blues song, "Matchbox". Sam Phillips, the owner of Sun Records, who wanted to try to fatten this sparse rockabilly instrumentation, had brought in his latest acquisition, Jerry Lee Lewis, still unknown outside Memphis, to play piano (at the time, a Wurlitzer Spinet) on the Perkins session. Lewis's first Sun single would be released a few days later. Sometime in the early afternoon, 21-year-old Elvis Presley, a former Sun artist now with RCA Victor, arrived to pay a casual visit accompanied by a girlfriend, Marilyn Evans.

After chatting with Phillips in the control room, Presley listened to the playback of Perkins's session, which he pronounced to be good. Then he went into the studio and some time later, the jam session began. At some point during the session, Sun artist Johnny Cash, who had recently enjoyed a few hit records on the country charts, arrived as well. (Cash wrote in his autobiography Cash that he had been first to arrive at the Sun Studio that day, wanting to listen in on the Perkins recording session.) Jack Clement was engineering that day and remembers saying to himself "I think I'd be remiss not to record this," and so he did. After running through a number of songs, Elvis and his girlfriend Evans slipped out as Jerry Lee pounded away on the piano. Cash wrote in Cash that "no one wanted to follow Jerry Lee, not even Elvis."

During the session, Phillips called a local newspaper, the Memphis Press-Scimitar. Bob Johnson, the newspaper's entertainment editor, came over to the studios with UPI representative Leo Sora and photographer George Pierce. Johnson wrote an article about the session, which appeared the following day in the Press-Scimitar under the headline "Million Dollar Quartet". The article contained the now-famous photograph of Presley seated at the piano surrounded by Lewis, Perkins and Cash (the uncropped version of the photo also includes Evans, shown seated atop the piano).

== Releases ==
Professional ratings
Review scores
Source	Rating
AllMusic	5/5 stars
MusicHound Rock	5/5
Rough Guides	5/5 stars
The Village Voice	B+

In 1969, Shelby Singleton bought Sun Records. He began a long search of the Sun catalogue, browsing through more than 10,000 hours of tape. At the same time, Singleton licensed much, if not all, of the Sun catalogue to the British Charly label for reissue in Europe. As a result of Singleton's and Charly's searches, a portion of the session came to light. This was issued in Europe in 1981 as "Charly/Sun" LP #1006 The Million Dollar Quartet, and it contained 17 tracks, focusing on gospel/spiritual music from the session.

Several years later, additional material was discovered. This resulted in the release of the 1987 "Charly/Sun" two-LP set #CDX 20 The Complete Million Dollar Session, together with their simultaneous issue in CD format in Europe. In 1990, they were replicated by RCA for US distribution as a CD, Cassette and LP, titled, Elvis Presley: The Million Dollar Quartet (RCA CD # 2023-2-R), the sleeve notes of which were written by Colin Escott of Showtime Music, Toronto, Ontario, Canada.

In 2006, RCA used a copy of the session recordings owned by Presley to create a 50th-anniversary issue of the session. The new release placed the titles in the original recorded sequence and contained about twelve minutes of previously unavailable material.

According to Ernst Jørgensen, an authority on Elvis who consults for RCA, the published material contains about 95 percent of the master recordings. "We found three reels", he says, "You could always argue that there were more. But in the first you can hear Elvis arriving and in the last you can hear him leaving. I doubt that there are more."

In his liner notes to The Survivors Live, a 1982 album that reunited Cash, Lewis and Perkins, Cash claims that Elvis performed "This Train is Bound for Glory" and "Vacation in Heaven" during the 1956 session, but neither track has surfaced.

The released albums contain 46 musical tracks, most of which are incomplete and are interspersed with chatter between the participants. They are not pristine, well rehearsed studio recordings, which were meant for commercial release, but rather the sound of a group of friends gathered to play old favorites and share the pleasure of making music. Bob Johnson described it as "an old fashioned barrel-house session with barber shop harmonies resulting."

Noting that The Million Dollar Quartet was the result of a casual afternoon jam session, AllMusic comment that the record is "a world away from the tight, well-produced rock & roll that Sam Phillips' Sun Studios was recording and releasing in the mid-'50s", further adding that the majority of the songs are gospel music and concluding: "Relaxed and informal, these recordings are an illuminating snapshot of a moment in rock & roll history." For The Village Voice in 1988, Robert Christgau wrote that The Million Dollar Quartet "isn't a phonograph album, it's a documentary", deeming it to be audio verité proof of "the great rockabillies" having a knowledge and passion for many kinds of music. He nonetheless said: "Fine as the three voices overheard by the Sun tape recorder were, I keep waiting for Elvis, Carl, and Jerry Lee to coalesce into a group. And spontaneous as the family sing is, I keep waiting for the session."

== Songs ==
Country music and country gospel loom large in the choice of songs. The songs of such country and Western legends as Bill Monroe, Ernest Tubb, Hank Snow and Gene Autry are among those featured. Lewis played most of the piano and Presley took nearly all of the lead vocals. The other participants easily follow Presley's lead with what seems a close familiarity with his choice of songs. Critics have remarked on the irony of this as rock & roll was branded as satanic music at the time.

Carl Perkins took the lead on only "Keeper of the Key" and seemed content to play guitar and supply harmony vocals. He had, however, been singing all afternoon. Clayton Perkins and Jay Perkins and drummer W. S. Holland can be heard on the earliest titles. The rhythm guitar on the earlier songs was played by Charles Underwood, who was a writer for Phillips's publishing companies. Presley also brought with him another aspiring singer, Cliff Gleaves, who might be participating on some of the ensemble parts.

Jerry Lee Lewis can be heard more frequently, often singing in duet with Presley and at the end of the session, when Presley got up to leave, he swiftly took over the piano and whipped off five piano ravers in rapid succession, including a rousing "Crazy Arms" (his debut Sun single) and a soulful make-over of Gene Autry's "You're the Only Star in My Blue Heaven".

Colin Escott, author of the sleeve notes for Elvis Presley: The Million Dollar Quartet, reported that according to Underwood, Presley and Phillips went into the control room while Lewis was playing and Presley commented to Bob Johnson that "[Lewis] could go. I think he has a great future ahead of him. He had a different style and the way he plays piano gets inside me."

Johnny Cash's voice does not seem to appear on any of the released tracks. Since his voice is not obvious on the tracks, the point at which Cash arrived at the studio has been a matter of discussion. Carl Perkins and others have stated that Cash was already at the studios when Presley arrived, with Perkins adding that Cash had stopped into the studios to "get some money".

Colin Escott reports that according to attendee Bob Johnson (whose article was published in the Memphis Press-Scimitar the day after the session), Cash joined Presley, Perkins and Lewis on "Blueberry Hill" and "Isle Of Golden Dreams". This was confirmed by Carl Perkins in a 1972 interview, when he stated that "we did things like 'Blueberry Hill', 'Island Of Golden Dreams', 'I Won't Have to Cross the Jordan Alone', 'The Old Rugged Cross', 'Peace in the Valley', 'Tutti Frutti', and 'Big Boss Man'." Of these, only "Peace in the Valley" has been released.

Cash himself, in his 1997 book Cash: The Autobiography commented, "I was there—I was the first to arrive and the last to leave, contrary to what has been written—but I was just there to watch Carl record, which he did until mid-afternoon, when Elvis came in with his girlfriend. At that point the session stopped and we all started laughing and cutting up together. Then Elvis sat down at the piano, and we started singing gospel songs we all knew, then some Bill Monroe songs. Elvis wanted to hear songs Bill had written besides "Blue Moon of Kentucky", and I knew the whole repertoire. So, again contrary to what some people have written, my voice is on the tape. It's not obvious, because I was farthest away from the mic and I was singing a lot higher than I usually did in order to stay in key with Elvis, but I guarantee you, I'm there."

Other reports, including one in a very detailed account in Peter Guralnick's book, Last Train to Memphis: The Rise of Elvis Presley, suggest that Cash stayed for only a short time and then left, possibly to do some Christmas shopping. Colin Escott also reports that Cash might have been brought in for the last part of the session, after Sam Phillips had decided to call the Memphis Press Scimitar.

Cash's presence for the entire session might be confirmed, or denied, by four pieces of "chatter" caught on the tapes. In the first, another Sun artist, Smokey Joe Baugh, came by and his gravelly voice can be heard after "I Shall Not Be Moved", saying "You oughta get up a quartet", which could either mean that they should add a fourth, or could also mean that the four of them should become an official quartet. In the second, a female voice can be heard asking if "This Rover Boys Trio can sing 'Farther Along'?", which could imply that only three (trio) were present at that point. (Elvis' then-girlfriend, Marilyn Evans, confirmed in 2008 that the voice was not hers, though she is later heard requesting the song "End of the Road".) Yet on the track prior to this Elvis can be heard saying "take it easy, boy" as someone exits the session. In the third piece of chatter, Elvis is plainly heard mentioning Cash by name on the track "As We Travel Along the Jericho Road", at the 0:07 mark, although the form of the reference leaves it ambiguous as to whether Cash was on premises at that point. Finally, Elvis can also be heard saying goodbye to someone named Johnny during the "Elvis Says Goodbye" track that closes the 50th anniversary release which seems to indicate that Presley was present when Cash left the session.

Country music was not the only choice of the participants; they performed "Home! Sweet Home!", a sentimental ballad as an energetic rockabilly clip. They can also be heard turning their attention to the hit parade of the day. Presley led the session with "Out Of Sight, Out Of Mind", an R & B song popularized by the Five Keys. Meanwhile, Lewis sings one line of Chuck Berry's "Too Much Monkey Business" which leads into Lewis and Presley experimenting with snippets of Berry's "Brown Eyed Handsome Man". Elvis can also be heard singing a snippet of Little Richard's "Rip It Up" (with a ribald change in the lyric) and Pat Boone's hit of the day, "Don't Forbid Me" which Elvis on the tape claims was first offered to him but the demo "sat around my house" without being played.

In addition, Presley previewed material that he was considering for up-coming RCA Victor sessions in January and February 1957. He sang "Is It So Strange", "Peace in the Valley", and "That's When Your Heartaches Begin", which he acknowledges on the tape as having been one of the songs he recorded for Sun during his demo session a couple of years earlier, and which he would record again for RCA Victor a month later. In the case of "Is It So Strange", he comments, "Ol' Faron Young wrote this song sent to me to record."

The title which most critics seem to highlight is Presley's rendition of "Don't Be Cruel", one of his major hits of 1956 (see 1956 in music). This is not Presley singing Presley, but his imitation of Jackie Wilson, then the lead singer with Billy Ward and His Dominoes. It appears as though the Presley entourage spent a few days in Las Vegas (most likely during Presley's short-lived tenure earlier in the year at the Frontier Hotel) and went to watch Wilson, who had covered Presley's song in his act.

Presley describes Jackie Wilson tearing up Las Vegas audiences with a house-on-fire rendition of "Don't Be Cruel". He goes on to say that, "He tried so hard until he got much better, boy, much better than that record of mine.... I went back four nights straight and heard that guy do that," he says, imitating Wilson's bluesy smolder and big finish.

"He sung the hell out of the song," Elvis can be heard saying with admiration, adding with a laugh, "I was on the table lookin' at him, 'Get 'im off, get 'im off!'" Obviously on a roll, Presley, then ripped into a slower, sassier version of "Paralyzed", a song recorded for his second album and also released on an extended play 45. He was backed up by Perkins and his trio.

According to the Rolling Stone review of the album, "'The Complete Million Dollar Session' provides a rare post-Sun glimpse of Elvis Presley momentarily free of the golden shackles of stardom and the manipulative grasp of his manager, Colonel Tom Parker. His singing, especially on the gospel numbers, is natural and relaxed, minus some of the trademark mannerisms of his official RCA releases."

Colin Escott has said, "They mixed and matched their disparate styles – and their innate musicality ensured that what emerged had the rarest of all musical qualities: originality."

The surviving members of the Quartet session would reunite several times in years to come, with Cash, Lewis and Perkins uniting in 1982 for the concert album The Survivors Live and again, in 1985, Perkins, Lewis, Cash and Roy Orbison, also a Sun recording artist in 1956, went back into the Sun Studios to record the album Class of '55.

== Reunions ==
- In 1977, Cash, Lewis, Perkins, and another Sun Records alumnus, Roy Orbison, performed "This Train is Bound for Glory", in tribute to Elvis, on the televised Johnny Cash Christmas Special.
- The Survivors Live - a 1982 live album featuring Cash, Lewis, and Perkins during Cash's 1981 tour of Europe.
- Class of '55 - a 1986 reunion of the surviving members, again with the addition of Orbison, recorded at the original Memphis Recording Service building.
- Interviews from the Class of '55 Recording Sessions - an album featuring interviews and chatter during the recording of Class of '55, which won the Grammy for Best Spoken Word Album in 1987.

== Members ==
- Elvis Presley – vocals, acoustic rhythm guitar, piano (1956; died 1977)
- Johnny Cash – vocals, acoustic rhythm guitar (1956, 1977, 1981, 1985; died 2003)
- Carl Perkins – vocals, lead guitar (1956, 1977, 1981, 1985; died 1998)
- Jerry Lee Lewis – vocals, piano (1956, 1977, 1981, 1985; died 2022)
- Roy Orbison – vocals (1977, 1985; died 1988)

== Tracks, writers and duration ==
Farther Along
A rendition of W. A. Fletcher and J. R. Baxter's Southern gospel song "Farther Along, performed by the Million Dollar Quartet.

1. "Instrumental" (Unknown) - 1:44
2. "Love Me Tender - Instrumental" (Presley/Matson) - 1:02
3. "Jingle Bells - Instrumental" (James Lord Pierpont) – 1:57
4. "White Christmas - Instrumental" (Berlin) - 2:05
5. "Reconsider Baby" (Fulsom) - 2:45
6. "Don't Be Cruel" (Presley/Blackwell) - 2:20
7. "Don't Be Cruel" (Presley/Blackwell) - 2:12
8. "Paralyzed" (Presley/Blackwell) - 3:00
9. "Don't Be Cruel" (Presley/Blackwell) - 0:36
10. "There's No Place Like Home" (Payne/Bishop) - 3:36
11. "When The Saints Go Marchin´ In" (Traditional) - 2:18
12. "Softly and Tenderly" (Will Lamartine Thompson) - 2:42
13. "When God Dips His Love in My Heart" (Derricks) - 0:23
14. "Just a Little Talk with Jesus" (Derricks) - 4:09
15. "Jesus Walked That Lonesome Valley" (Traditional) - 3:28
16. "I Shall Not Be Moved" (Traditional) - 3:49
17. "Peace In The Valley" (Dorsey) - 1:33
18. "Down By the Riverside" (Traditional) - 2:26
19. "I'm with a Crowd But So Alone" (Tubb/Story) - 1:16
20. "Farther Along" (Fletcher/Baxter) - 2:08
21. "Blessed Jesus (Hold My Hand)" (Traditional) - 1:26
22. "On the Jericho Road" (Traditional) - 0:52
23. "I Just Can't Make It By Myself" (Clara Ward) - 1:04
24. "Little Cabin Home on the Hill" (Bill Monroe/Lester Flatt) - 0:46
25. "Summertime Is Past and Gone" (Monroe) - 0:14
26. "I Hear a Sweet Voice Calling" (Monroe) - 0:36
27. "Sweetheart You Done Me Wrong" (Monroe) - 0:28
28. "Keeper of the Key (Carl Lead)" (Stewart/Howard/Devine/Guynes) - 2:08
29. "Crazy Arms" (Mooney/Seals) - 0:17
30. "Don't Forbid Me" (Singleton) - 1:19
31. "Too Much Monkey Business" (Berry) - 0:05
32. "Brown Eyed Handsome Man" (Berry) - 1:14
33. "Out of Sight, Out of Mind" (Hunter/Otis) - 0:37
34. "Brown Eyed Handsome Man" (Berry) - 1:53
35. "Don't Forbid Me" (Singleton) - 0:50
36. "You Belong to My Heart" (Gilbert/Lara) - 1:10
37. "Is It So Strange" (Young) - 1:21
38. "That's When Your Heartaches Begin" (Hill/Fisher/Raskin) - 4:58
39. "Brown Eyed Handsome Man" (Berry) - 0:17
40. "Rip It Up" (Blackwell/Marascalco) - 0:23
41. "I'm Gonna Bid My Blues Goodbye" (Snow) - 0:55
42. "Crazy Arms" (Mooney/Seals) - 3:36
43. "That's My Desire" (Loveday/Kresa) - 2:02
44. "End of the Road" (Lewis) - 1:44
45. "Black Bottom Stomp" (Morton) - 1:11
46. "You're the Only Star in My Blue Heaven" (Autry) - 1:12
47. Elvis Says Goodbye - 0:40

== Musical ==
The stage musical Million Dollar Quartet, with a book by Floyd Mutrux and Colin Escott, dramatizes the Million Dollar Quartet session. It premiered at Florida's Seaside Music Theatre and was then staged at Village Theatre in Issaquah, Washington (a Seattle suburb) in 2007, breaking box office records. The musical opened for a limited run at Chicago's Goodman Theatre on September 27, 2008. Mutrux co-directed the Chicago production with Eric D. Schaeffer, of Virginia's Signature Theatre. The show transferred to Chicago's Apollo Theater where it opened on October 31, 2008.

The Broadway production opened at the Nederlander Theatre on April 11, 2010. The Broadway production closed on June 12, 2011 after 489 performances and 34 previews, and then re-opened Off-Broadway at New World Stages. Million Dollar Quartet then opened in the West End at the Noël Coward Theatre on February 28, 2011, with previews from February 8. The production closed on January 14, 2012.

The Broadway play was nominated for three Tony Awards in 2010: Best Musical, Best Book of a Musical for Escott and Mutrux, and Best Featured Actor in a Musical for Levi Kreis. Kreis won, marking the show's sole Tony win.

== See also ==
- Elvis Presley's Sun recordings
- List of musicians of the 1950s
