= The Session (Jerry Lee Lewis album) =

1973 album by Jerry Lee Lewis

Studio album by Jerry Lee Lewis
- Released: 1973
- Recorded: January 8–11, 1973
- Studio: London, England
- Genres: Rock and roll, blues, country, boogie woogie
- Length: 1:15:30
- Label: Mercury
- Producer: Steve Rowland

Jerry Lee Lewis chronology
Who's Gonna Play This Old Piano? (1972)	The Session (1973)	Sometimes a Memory Ain't Enough (1973)

Singles from The Session - Recorded in London with Great Artists
- 1. "No Headstone on My Grave" Released: June 1973; 2. "Drinkin' Wine Spo-Dee-O-Dee" Released: March 1973

The (Complete) Session – Recorded in London with Great Guest Artists

Studio album by Jerry Lee Lewis
- Released: August 2006
- Recorded: January 8–11, 1973
- Studios: London, England
- Genres: Rock and roll, blues, country, boogie woogie
- Length: 1:33:13
- Label: Mercury
- Producer: Steve Rowland

Jerry Lee Lewis chronology
Live at Gilley's (1999)	The (Complete) Session – Recorded in London with Great Guest Artists (2006)	Last Man Standing (2006)

The Session – Recorded in London with Great Guest Artists is a double album by American musician Jerry Lee Lewis, released on Mercury Records in 1973. It was recorded in London and features Lewis teaming up with British musicians, including Peter Frampton and Albert Lee.

== Reception ==
Professional ratings
Review scores
Source	Rating
Christgau's Record Guide	B+

The Session would be Lewis's highest pop charting album since 1964's Golden Hits of Jerry Lee Lewis, hitting number 37. It did far better on the country albums chart, rising to number 4. AllMusic gives the album 3 out of 5 stars and contends that the album only lacks when "compared to his early classic rock & roll recordings."

== Track listing ==
Side 1

1. "Drinking Wine, Spo-Dee O'Dee" (McGhee, Williams)
2. "Music to the Man" (T. Colton)
3. "Baby What You Want Me to Do" (Reed)
4. "Bad Moon Rising" (Fogerty)
5. "Sea Cruise" (Smith)

Side 2

6. "Jukebox" (Colton, Hodges, Lee)
7. "No Headstone on My Grave" (Charlie Rich)
8. "Big Boss Man" (Dixon, Smith)
9. "Pledging My Love" (Robey, Washington)
10. "Memphis" (Berry)

Side 3

11. "Trouble in Mind" (Richard M. Jones)
12. "Johnny B. Goode" (Berry)
13. "High School Confidential" (Lewis, Hargrave)
14. "Early Morning Rain" (Lightfoot)

Side 4

15. "Whole Lotta Shakin' Going On" (David, Williams)
16. "Sixty-Minute Man" (Ward, Marks)
17. "Movin' On Down The Line" (Orbison, Phillips)
18. "What'd I Say" (Charles)
19. "Rock & Roll Medley":
  "Good Golly Miss Molly" (Marascalo, Blackwell)
  "Long Tall Sally" (Johnson, Blackwell, Penniman)
  "Jenny, Jenny", "Tutti Frutti" (Penniman, LaBostrie)
  "Whole Lotta Shakin' Going On" (David, Williams)

== Charts ==
Chart (1973)	Peak position
Australia (Kent Music Report)	36
US Billboard Hot 200	37

== Personnel ==
- Jerry Lee Lewis - vocals, piano
- Albert Lee, Alvin Lee, Chas Hodges, Joe Jammer, Mick Jones, Peter Frampton, Rory Gallagher - guitar
- Drew Croon, Gary Taylor, Kenny Lovelace, Raymond Barry Smith - acoustic guitar
- Delaney Bramlett, Rory Gallagher - bottleneck guitar
- B.J. Cole - pedal steel
- Kenny Lovelace - violin
- Chas Hodges, John Gustafson, Klaus Voormann - bass
- Andy Bown, J. Peter Robinson - electric piano
- Andy Bown, Gary Wright, Matthew Fisher, Tony Ashton - organ
- Kenney Jones, Mike Kellie, Pete Gavin - drums
- Brian Parrish, Gary Taylor, Jerry Lee Lewis, Jr., Matthew Fisher, Mike Kellie, Pete Gavin, Raymond Barry Smith, Steve Rowland, Tony Ashton, Tony Colton - percussion
- Brian Parrish - harmonica
- Casey Synge, Dari Lalou, Keren Friedman, Thunderthighs - backing vocals

Technical

- Charles Fach - executive producer
- Martin Rushent - engineer
