= Down the Road (Van Morrison album) =

Studio album by Van Morrison
- Released: 14 May 2002
- Recorded: Autumn 2000 – September 2001
- Studio: The Wool Hall (Beckington, UK)
- Genre: Celtic rock, blues, R&B
- Length: 67:09
- Label: Universal
- Producer: Van Morrison

Van Morrison chronology
You Win Again (2000)	Down the Road (2002)	What's Wrong with This Picture? (2003)

Singles from Down the Road
- 1. "Hey Mr. DJ" b/w "Someone Like You"/"Bright Side of the Road" Released: May 2002; 2. "Meet Me In The Indian Summer" b/w "In the Afternoon/Ancient Highway/Raincheck/Meditation/Joe Turner Sings/Don't You Make Me High"/"In the Midnight" Released: August 2002

Down the Road is the twenty-ninth studio album by Northern Irish singer Van Morrison (see 2002 in music). The album has a nostalgic tone, lyrically and musically, and its arrangements mix R&B and blues with country and folk, and, with a few exceptions, like "Georgia on My Mind," the music is most often rooted in 1950s and early 1960s popular music.

The album charted at #6 in the UK and #26 in the US, while consistently charting in the top 20 across Europe.

== Recording ==
The album was originally recorded with singer and pianist Linda Gail Lewis within a month of the release of You Win Again. It was originally entitled Choppin' Wood, but Morrison re-recorded it, removing Linda Gail Lewis' contributions to the songs and deleting other songs from the album. Morrison recorded another nine songs to the album in late 2001 and retitled it Down the Road. The songs that were included were increased from an original ten to fifteen tracks and a lengthy sixty-seven minutes. One of the original songs, "Just Like Greta", that was not included on the album would appear on Morrison's 2005 release Magic Time, without a rerecording. It was finished by year's end in 2001 and released after numerous delays.

== Composition ==
The songs on the album lean towards the blues the singer listened to in his youth. The title track was originally entitled "Down the Road I Go" and was first recorded in 1981 with guitarist Mark Knopfler. The song was re-recorded with Linda Gail Lewis in November 2000 with additional lyrics. "Choppin' Wood" is a tribute to the singer's father, George Morrison, who had died suddenly from a heart attack more than a decade earlier. In "The Beauty of the Days Gone By", Morrison attempts to come to terms with approaching old age. In the song "Whatever Happened to P.J. Proby?" Morrison refers to musicians P. J. Proby and Scott Walker and makes political references to Screaming Lord Sutch, the former leader of the British Monster Raving Loony Party, who died in 1999. In the second verse of the song Morrison claims that he

Don't have no frame of reference no more
Not even Screaming Lord Sutch
Without him now there's no Raving Loony Party
Nowadays I guess there's not much

== Reception ==
Professional ratings
Review scores
Source	Rating
Allmusic	4/5 stars
The Music Box	4/5 stars
Pop Matters	(favorable)
Rolling Stone	4/5 stars
ShakingThrough.net	(4.2/5)

Down the Road was commercially and critically one of Morrison's most successful albums. It charted higher in the U.S. than any of Morrison's albums since 1972's Saint Dominic's Preview.

John Metzger of The Music Box wrote, "every few years, Morrison manages to tap into some magical space that sums up both his career and his influence in one fell swoop ... not that they're all that groundbreaking, they're just penultimate pieces of perfection. Such is the case with his latest near-masterpiece Down the Road, which finds him fondly recalling the folk, blues, and jazz to which he grew up listening."

Pop Matters critic John Kriecbergs stated in his review: "Bolstered by yet another outstanding collection of backing musicians, ... Down the Road rivals some of Morrison's strongest work."

== Cover ==
The album cover depicts the front of a record store with a window full of LP covers by blues, R&B, jazz, and old rock & roll artists, a deliberate blueprint of the album's influences. The shop pictured was a real record store, Nashers Music Store in Walcot Street, Bath, UK, specially dressed for the photo-shoot.

== Track listing ==
All songs by Van Morrison except as indicated.

1. "Down the Road" – 4:15
2. "Meet Me in the Indian Summer" – 3:57
3. "Steal My Heart Away" – 4:20
4. "Hey Mr. DJ" – 3:45
5. "Talk Is Cheap" – 4:19
6. "Choppin' Wood" – 3:26
7. "What Makes the Irish Heart Beat" – 3:47
8. "All Work and No Play" – 4:51
9. "Whatever Happened to P.J. Proby?" – 3:13
10. "The Beauty of the Days Gone By" – 5:45
11. "Georgia on My Mind" (Hoagy Carmichael, Stuart Gorrell) – 5:35
12. "Only a Dream" – 4:57
13. "Man Has to Struggle" – 5:07
14. "Evening Shadows" (Acker Bilk, Morrison) – 4:01
15. "Fast Train" – 5:01

== Personnel ==
=== Musicians ===
- Van Morrison – acoustic guitar, harmonica, alto saxophone, vocals
- Mick Green – acoustic and electric guitars
- Johnny Scott – electric guitar, background vocals
- David Hayes – bass guitar, double bass
- Pete Hurley – bass guitar
- Bob Loveday – violin
- Jake Walker – viola
- Rosie Wetters – cello, string section leader
- Fiachra Trench – piano
- Richard Dunn – piano, Hammond organ
- Geraint Watkins – piano, Hammond organ
- John Allair – Hammond organ
- Acker Bilk – clarinet
- Martin Winning – clarinet, tenor saxophone
- Lee Goodall – tenor, alto and baritone saxophones, flute, background vocals
- Matt Holland – trumpet, flugelhorn, background vocals
- Crawford Bell – background vocals
- Olwin Bell – background vocals
- Siobhan Pettit – background vocals
- Aine Whelan – background vocals
- Karen Hamill – background vocals
- Colin Griffin – drums
- Bobby Irwin – drums

=== Production ===
- Van Morrison – producer
- Stuart Bruce – engineer
- Tim Cooper – mastering
- Walter Samuel – engineer, mixing
- Ben Sidran – liner notes
- Peter Thorpe – photography
- Johnny Scott, Aine Whelan – vocal arrangement
- Fiachra Trench – string arrangement

== Charts ==
=== Album ===
UK Album Chart (United Kingdom)

Year	Chart	Position
2002	UK Album Chart	6

Billboard (North America)

Year	Chart	Position
2002	The Billboard 200	25

Chart (2002)	Peak position
Norway	5
Sweden	10
Italy	20
Australia	7
Netherlands	13

== Certifications ==
Region	Certification	Certified units/sales
Australia (ARIA)	Gold	35,000^{^}
United Kingdom (BPI)	Silver	60,000^{^}
^{^} Shipments figures based on certification alone.
