= Mean Old Man =

Studio album by Jerry Lee Lewis
- Released: September 7, 2010
- Recorded: March 2008−January 2010
- Genre: Rock and roll, country
- Length: 61:29
- Label: Verve
- Producer: Jim Keltner, Steve Bing

Jerry Lee Lewis chronology
Last Man Standing (2006)	Mean Old Man (2010)	Rock & Roll Time (2014)

Singles from Mean Old Man
- 1. "Mean Old Man" Released: August 2010

Professional ratings
Review scores
Source	Rating
Uncut	4/5 stars

Mean Old Man is the fortieth studio album by American rock and roll pioneer Jerry Lee Lewis. Like his previous album Last Man Standing, this album features duets and other collaborations with famous musicians.

== Track listing ==
1. "Mean Old Man" (with Ronnie Wood) (2:46)
2. "Rockin' My Life Away" (with Kid Rock & Slash) (2:16)
3. "Dead Flowers" (with Mick Jagger) (3:52)
4. "Middle Age Crazy" (with Tim McGraw & Jon Brion) (3:44)
5. "You Can Have Her" (with Eric Clapton & James Burton) (2:37)
6. "You Are My Sunshine" (with Sheryl Crow & Jon Brion) (3:35)
7. "Hold You In My Heart" (with Shelby Lynne) (2:41)
8. "Swinging Doors" (with Merle Haggard & James Burton) (2:40)
9. "Roll Over Beethoven" (with Ringo Starr, John Mayer, James "Hutch" Hutchinson, Jim Keltner, & Jon Brion) (2:45)
10. "Sweet Virginia" (with Keith Richards) (3:50)
11. "Railroad to Heaven" (with Solomon Burke) (3:55)
12. "Bad Moon Rising" (with John Fogerty) (2:17)
13. "Please Release Me" (with Gillian Welch) (3:39)
14. "Whiskey River" (with Willie Nelson) (3:19)
15. "I Really Don’t Want to Know" (with Gillian Welch) (3:03)
16. "Sunday Morning Coming Down" (5:07)
17. "Will the Circle Be Unbroken" (with Mavis Staples, Robbie Robertson & Nils Lofgren) (3:48)
18. "Miss the Mississippi and You" (3:25)
19. "Here Comes That Rainbow" (with Shelby Lynne) (2:06)

== Critical reception ==
In a review for AllMusic, Stephen Erlewine gave the album 3.5 stars out of 5, stating that "the vibe on this album is a little more subdued" than its predecessor, Last Man Standing.

In 2023, Mojo Magazine ranked it as Lewis' 10th best album (of any kind, including live albums and compilation albums).

== Chart performance ==
Chart	Peak position
Austrian Albums (Ö3 Austria)	53
Belgian Albums (Ultratop Flanders)	64
Belgian Albums (Ultratop Wallonia)	88
French Albums (SNEP)	180
Greek Albums (IFPI)	11
Italian Albums (FIMI)	45
Spanish Albums (PROMUSICAE)	52
Swedish Albums (Sverigetopplistan)	60
US Billboard 200	30
