= When Two Worlds Collide =

Studio album by Jerry Lee Lewis
- Released: 1980
- Recorded: 1977−79
- Venue: Nashville, Tennessee
- Genres: Country, rock and roll
- Label: Elektra
- Producer: Eddie Kilroy

Jerry Lee Lewis chronology
| Jerry Lee Lewis (1979) | When Two Worlds Collide (1980) | Killer Country (1980) |

When Two Worlds Collide is a studio album by American musician and pianist Jerry Lee Lewis, released on Elektra Records in 1980.

== Critical reception ==
Professional ratings
Review scores
| Source | Rating |
|---|---|
| AllMusic | 3/5 stars |
| Robert Christgau | B− |
| The Encyclopedia of Popular Music | 3/5 stars |

The New York Times wrote: "Drawing upon his encyclopedic knowledge of American pop-music idioms, from Sousa marches through ragtime to raunchy rock and roll, Mr. Lewis plays exuberantly throughout When Two Worlds Collide, his left hand thumping out the beat while his right races up and down the keys in imitation of the ups-and-downs of his career." Robert Christgau noted that "new producer Eddie Kilroy doesn't push Jerry Lee the way Bones Howe did on Jerry Lee Lewis."

== Track listing ==
1. "Rockin' Jerry Lee" (Jerry Lee Lewis) - 2:35
2. "Who Will Buy the Wine" (Billy Mize) - 2:54
3. "Love Game" (Hugh Moffatt) - 3:30
4. "Alabama Jubilee" (George Cobb, Jack Yellen) - 4:45
5. "Good Time Charlie's Got the Blues" (Danny O'Keefe) - 2:22
6. "When Two Worlds Collide" (Bill Anderson, Roger Miller) - 2:27
7. "Good News Travels Fast" (Rick Klang) - 2:49
8. "I Only Want a Buddy Not a Sweetheart" (Edward H. Jones) - 3:40
9. "Honky Tonk Stuff" (Jerry Chesnut) - 2:57
10. "Toot, Toot, Tootsie, Goodbye" (Ernie Erdman, Ted Fiorito, Gus Kahn) - 3:53

== Personnel ==
- Jerry Lee Lewis – vocals, piano
- David Kirby, Duke Faglier – guitar
- Kenny Lovelace – guitar, fiddle
- Bobby Thompson – acoustic guitar, banjo
- Steve Chapman – acoustic guitar
- Stu Basore – steel guitar
- Bobby Dyson – bass
- Bunky Keels – electric piano, organ
- Jimmy Isbell – drums, percussion
- George Tidwell, Ron Keller – trumpet
- Dennis Good – trombone
- Denis Solee – clarinet
- The Lea Jane Singers – backing vocals
- The Shelly Kurland String Section – strings
- Billy Strange – string arrangements
