= Carl McVoy =

American pianist

Carl McVoy (January 3, 1931 – January 3, 1992) was an American pianist.

== Career ==
McVoy was an older cousin of Jerry Lee Lewis. He had been to New York City with his father, who had been a minister there. McVoy got hooked on boogie-woogie while in New York, which he subsequently brought back to Pine Bluff, Arkansas.

Plucked from the construction industry by Ray Harris, McVoy recorded "You Are My Sunshine" at Sun Records.

He died on his 61st birthday in 1992.
