= I Am What I Am (Jerry Lee Lewis album) =

Studio album by Jerry Lee Lewis
- Released: April 1984
- Venue: Nashville, Tennessee
- Studio: Music City Music Hall (Nashville, Tennessee); Woodland (Nashville, Tennessee); Soundshop (Nashville, Tennessee)
- Genre: Country, rock
- Label: MCA
- Producer: Ron Chancey

Jerry Lee Lewis chronology
My Fingers Do The Talkin' (1983)	I Am What I Am (1984)	Class of '55 (1986)

I Am What I Am is a studio album by American musician and pianist Jerry Lee Lewis released in April 1984. I Am What I Am was Lewis' second and final MCA album, and the first since 1967 to not chart in the US.

== Recording ==
The second and last album Jerry Lee Lewis made for MCA records failed to make an impression on the album charts. It was his first album since Soul My Way in 1967 that would not reach the US album charts. As his first MCA album, it was produced by Ron Chancey. The album included many ace studio musicians and offered a similar mix of a few uptempo rock 'n' roll and many slower country songs as its predecessor. Some tunes were new and written for the occasion, but others dated back decades; the oldest one ("I'm Looking Over a Four Leaf Clover") was first recorded in 1927. Many lyrics cover well-known territory for Jerry Lee, boasting his independent lifestyle (in the title song co-written by his long-time guitar and fiddle player Kenny Lovelace), his love for women in "Get Out Your Big Roll Daddy" (also recorded by Levon Helm, former member of The Band, in 1982) and a reminition about his "Honky Tonk Heart". Phoebe Lewis – his then 21 year old daughter with his former wife Myra Gale – is credited as one of the photographers of the album cover.

The year the album was released brought some highlights to the Killer's personal life. He married his sixth wife – Kerrie McCarver – and managed to temporarily avoid conviction on charges of tax evasion. He continued to suffer with his health, however, surviving two near death experiences in 1984 alone. In 1987 the title song – featuring Ron Wood in the backing band would also lend its name to a TV-movie about Jerry Lee's life.

== Critical reception ==
The album did not make much impression on the charts or music critics, but received a short, partially favorable mentioning in Billboard: "If you can wade through all the chest-thumping and self-aggrandizing riffs Lewis so favors here, you'll find a lot of very moving performances, including such classic weepers as 'Careless Hands', 'Candy Kisses' and 'Send Me The Pillow That You Dream On'." Jerry Sharpe in The Pittsburgh Press said that it "was appropriately named" given Lewis had not changed despite his personal troubles and his talent and ability remained unchanged saying the "album is tops. His dynamic enthusiasm is so contagious that same studio musicians who back up dozens of performers sound a little better behind ole Jerry Lee." Another review at the time stated that Lewis "quieted down" slightly, but the album was still "unmistakably" him. Other overall regarded the album as just moderately favorable but laud his covers of classic songs adjusted to fit his particular style. Paul W. Dennis, in a 2012 review, notes the number of covers and refers to it as "being an album of country covers". Jimmy Guterman is least impressed in his 1991 biography on Jerry Lee Lewis, rating the MCA recordings tired and listless.

Both MCA albums were long out of print, with songs only appearing on compilation albums. To date, they do not feature on Spotify, probably due to the huge UMG fire in 2009 that destroyed the MCA master tapes of Jerry Lee Lewis and many other artists.

== Track listing ==
1. "I Am What I Am" (Kenny Lovelace, Bill Taylor)
2. "Only You (And You Alone)" (Buck Ram)
3. "Get Out Your Big Roll Daddy" (Roger Chapman, Troy Seals)
4. "Have I Got a Song for You" (Jerry McBee, Ed Penney)
5. "Careless Hands" (Bob Hilliard, Carl Sigman)
6. "Candy Kisses" (George Morgan)
7. "I'm Looking Over a Four Leaf Clover" (Mort Dixon, Harry M. Woods)
8. "Send Me the Pillow That You Dream on" (Hank Locklin)
9. "Honky Tonk Heart" (Bob Morrison, Johnny MacRae, Wanda Maillote)
10. "That Was the Way It Was Then" (Mickey Newbury)

== Personnel ==
- Jerry Lee Lewis – vocals, keyboards
- David Briggs, Hargus "Pig" Robbins - keyboards
- Kenny Lovelace – electric guitar, fiddle
- Buddy Harman - drums
- Bob Moore - bass
- Pete Drake – steel guitar
- Reggie Young, Duncan Cameron, Billy Sanford – electric guitar
- Jerry Shook, Chip Young – acoustic guitar
- Steve Nathan - Synthesizer
- Harold Bradley - electric bass
- Diane Tidwell, Wendy Suits, Lori Brooks, Linda Neal, Lisa Silver, Vicki Hampton, Hurshel Wiginton, Philip Forrest, Louis Nunkey, Dennis Wilson, Doug Clements - background vocals
