= Killer Country =

Studio album by Jerry Lee Lewis
- Released: 1980
- Recorded: 1977−80
- Venue: Nashville, Tennessee
- Genre: Country
- Label: Elektra
- Producer: Eddie Kilroy

Jerry Lee Lewis chronology
| When Two Worlds Collide (1980) | Killer Country (1980) | The Survivors Live (1982) |

Killer Country is a studio album by American musician and pianist Jerry Lee Lewis, released on Elektra Records in 1980. The album peaked at No. 35 on Billboard's Top Country Albums chart.

== Critical reception ==
Professional ratings
Review scores
| Source | Rating |
|---|---|
| AllMusic | 4.5 stars |
| Robert Christgau | B+ |
| The Encyclopedia of Popular Music | 4/5 stars |
| (The New) Rolling Stone Album Guide | 4/5 stars |

The New York Times wrote that the album "keeps Mr. Lewis's singing and playing, together with a fine, rocking small band, in the foreground most of the way through, and while it's obviously aimed at a country market, it should also please Mr. Lewis's rock-oriented fans more than any of his other recent LP's... He sounds confident, inspired and ready for 1981." Robert Christgau praised the "magnificently over-the-hill" "Thirty-Nine and Holding".

== Track listing ==
1. "Folsom Prison Blues" (Johnny Cash)
2. "I'd Do It All Again" (Jerry Foster, Bill Rice)
3. "Jukebox Junky" (Danny Morrison, David Kirby)
4. "Too Weak to Fight" (Chuck Howard)
5. "Late Night Lovin' Man" (Rick Klang)
6. "Change Places with Me" (David Wilkins, Maria A. Kilroy)
7. "Let Me On" (Layng Martine Jr.)
8. "Thirty-Nine and Holding" (Foster, Rice)
9. "Mama, This One's for You" (Ray Griff)
10. "Over the Rainbow" (E.Y. Harburg, Harold Arlen)

== Personnel ==
- Jerry Lee Lewis - vocals, piano
- David Kirby, Duke Faglier - electric guitar
- Steve Chapman - acoustic guitar
- Kenny Lovelace - fiddle, electric guitar
- Bobby Thompson - banjo, acoustic guitar
- Russ Hicks, Stu Basore - steel guitar
- Bobby Dyson - bass guitar
- Bunky Keels - electric piano, organ
- Jimmy Isbell - drums, percussion
- The Lea Jane Singers - backing vocals
- John Gobe, Rex Peer, Terry Mead - horns
- Shelly Kurland - strings
- Billy Strange - string arrangements
