= Choppin' Wood =

Song by Van Morrison

from the album Down the Road
- Released: May 14, 2002 (June 26, 2024 re-recorded version)
- Recorded: October 2000, The Wool Hall Studios, Beckington
- Genre: Celtic rock, folk rock, R&B
- Length: 3:26
- Label: Universal
- Songwriter(s): Van Morrison
- Producer(s): Van Morrison

"Choppin' Wood" is a song written by Northern Irish singer-songwriter Van Morrison and included on his 2002 album titled Down the Road. A re-recorded version with a different arrangement was released as a single on June 26, 2024.

== Recording and composition ==
It was recorded in October 2000 at the Wool Hall Studios in Beckington with Linda Gail Lewis and her band, the Red Hot Pokers and with Walter Samuel as engineer. At the time, it was planned to be the title song for an album that was never released. According to author Clinton Heylin, Lewis' contributions were removed before the song was released on Down the Road.

The song is autobiographical and Morrison's musical tribute to his father, George Morrison who had died from sudden heart failure in 1988. The song suggests that the senior Morrison returned from Detroit, Michigan, in his son's early childhood, and led a life of "quiet desperation", having failed to find a permanent job and move his family to America. He brought back with him a record collection that would be of the greatest influence on his young son's development as a blues, R&B, and soul singer. But according to the lyrics of the song his father had become dispirited and spent years of his life just riding his bike to work at the Harland and Wolff shipyard, returning home to sit in front of the television set. In the lyrics of the song, the singer sympathetically assures his father that he did the best he could.

== Other performances ==
Van Morrison has often performed this song in concert since its release; it was recorded on a TV film shown on PBS television from a show performed on September 14, 2006 (Austin City Limits), the night before his festival performance at the Austin City Limits Festival.

== Personnel ==
- Van Morrison – acoustic guitar, harmonica, vocals
- John Allair – Hammond organ
- Lee Goodall – alto saxophone, tenor saxophone
- Colin Griffin – drums
- Pete Hurley – bass
- Martin Winning – clarinet
- Johnny Scott – backing vocals
- Aine Whelan – backing vocals
- Siobhan Pettit – backing vocals
- Karen Hamill – backing vocals
- Crawford Bell – backing vocals
- Olwin Bell – backing vocals
