= Country Class =

Studio album by Jerry Lee Lewis
- Released: 1976
- Recorded: US, Nashville, Tennessee
- Genres: Country, gospel
- Label: Mercury
- Producers: Jerry Kennedy; Charles Fach on "After the Fool You've Made of Me", "The One Rose That's Left in My Heart" and "The Closest Thing to You"

Jerry Lee Lewis chronology
Odd Man In (1975)	Country Class (1976)	Country Memories (1977)

Professional ratings
Review scores
Source	Rating
AllMusic	3/5 stars
The Rolling Stone Album Guide	3/5 stars

Country Class is a studio album by American musician and pianist Jerry Lee Lewis, released on Mercury Records in 1976. Cam Mullins was credited for the string and horn arrangements on "Let's Put It Back Together", "Jerry Lee's Rock & Roll Revival Show" and "The Closest Thing to You".

== Track listing ==
1. "Let's Put It Back Together Again" (Jerry Foster, Bill Rice)
2. "No One Will Ever Know" (Mel Foree, Fred Rose)
3. "You Belong to Me" (Pee Wee King, Chilton Price, Redd Stewart)
4. "I Sure Miss Those Good Old Times" (Mack Vickery)
5. "Old Country Church" (Clarence Thorne, Lance Sterling)
6. "After the Fool You've Made of Me" (Jerry Foster, Bill Rice)
7. "Jerry Lee's Rock & Roll Revival Show" (Jerry Foster, Bill Rice)
8. "Wedding Bells" (Claude Boone)
9. "Only Love Can Get You in My Door" (Ric Marlow, Michel Rubini)
10. "The One Rose (That's Left in My Heart)" (Del Lyon, Lani McIntire)
11. "Closest Thing to You" (Bob McDill)
