= Meat Man =

Rock 'n' roll song by Atlanta James

Single by Jerry Lee Lewis

from the album Southern Roots: Back Home to Memphis
- B-side: "Just A Little Bit"
- Released: September 1973
- Genre: Rock
- Length: 2:32
- Label: Mercury #0745
- Songwriter: Mack Vickery
- Producer: Huey P. Meaux

Jerry Lee Lewis singles chronology
"I'm Left, You're Right, She's Gone" (1972)	"Meat Man" (1973)	"He Can't Fill My Shoes" (1974)

"Meat Man" is a rock 'n' roll song written by Mack Vickery and originally recorded by him in 1970 under the name Atlanta James. The most well known recording was by Jerry Lee Lewis, and was the first and only single off Lewis's 1973 album Southern Roots: Back Home to Memphis.

== Composition ==
Variously described as "an incomparably dirty song", "a cartoonish, over-the-top double entre-laden rocker with lyrics that left very little to the imagination, "a ribald celebration of sexual conquests", "the most frankly sexual song of Jerry Lee's career, no small achievement" and "a filthy Mack Vickery tune written with Jerry Lee in mind, ... two minutes and forty seconds of vivid sexual boasts, delivered furiously and convincingly", "Meat Man" listed a range of cities in the south of the United States, and the type of meat the narrator ate there, including lines like “I been down to Macon, Georgia/I ate the fuzz off a Georgia peach/Plucked me a chicken in Memphis/Mama, I still got feathers in my teeth" and "I had a charcoal steak in Dallas and fed my bone to a Fort Worth dog", interspersed with the chorus "They call me the Meat Man, you oughta see me eat ma'am".

While Vickery recorded "Meat Man" under the nom de plume "Atlanta James" to protect himself from charges of smut mongering, Lewis was typically unconcerned about any negative reaction to his version of the song.

== Recording ==
Lewis's version was recorded on 24 September 1973 as part of a session at Trans Maximus inc. studio in Memphis. Producer Huey P. Meaux, who was concerned that Lewis's piano playing was being lost amongst the strings recently added to Lewis's music, miked Lewis' piano so it became central to the sound and feel of "Meat Man".

During the recording session, Lewis threatened to kill a photographer, continually insulted Meaux and constantly drank tequila and swallowed a variety of pills.

== Personnel ==
Personnel included:

- Paul Cannon, Steve Cropper, Kenny Lovelace, Carl Perkins, Jim Tarbutton, Tony Joe White - Guitar
- Tommy Cathy, Donald "Duck" Dunn, Harmon "Hawk" Hawkins - Bass
- Charles Owens - Steel Guitar
- Al Jackson Jr., Morris Tarp Tarrant, Joel Williams - Drums
- Jerry Lee Lewis, Jr. - Percussion
- Mack Vickery - Harmonica
- James Brown, Augie Meyers, Marty Morrison - Organ
- Memphis Horns (Wayne Jackson, James Mitchell, Jack Hale, Ed Logan, Andrew Love), Russ Carlton, Mark Lindsay, Bill Taylor - Horns
- Sugar Sweets - Backing vocals

== Reception ==
"Meat Man" was one of the few Lewis singles to fail to chart since his return to favour in 1968, although Lewis would later state that it was the only song he could follow “Whole Lotta Shakin' Goin' On” in his live show. Music historian Colin Escott believed that "Meat Man" was the best song on Southern Roots but due to its content it was obviously destined not to be played on radio and sell in sufficient numbers to chart.

Meaux later said of "Meat Man"; "it was a little too early to pull that song for a single. It might be big today. People don't pay no mind to a few dirty words. In them days they'd say, 'Oh My God, did you hear what he just said?' But me and Jerry Lee both walked on the edge of what we could both do and say without falling over. Sometimes we fell over. I felt that we were saying things that people would like to say but were afraid to say."

== Sources ==
- Bragg, R. (2015) Jerry Lee Lewis: His Own Story, Cannongate: Edinburgh. ISBN 978 0 85786 159 7.
- Escott, C. (1987) Jerry Lee Lewis: The Killer 1973-1977, Bear Family Book: Vollersode, West Germany. ISBN 3 924787 05 0.
- Flynn, R. (2019) Vintage Rock Presents Jerry Lee Lewis, Vintage Rock: Bath, UK.
- Guterman, J. (1991) Rockin' My Life Away: Listening to Jerry Lee Lewis, Rutledge Hill Press: Nashville, Tennessee. ISBN 1 55853 081 9.
- White, C. (1995) Killer, Random House: Sydney. ISBN 0 7126 7529 9.
