= Crown Victoria Custom '51 =

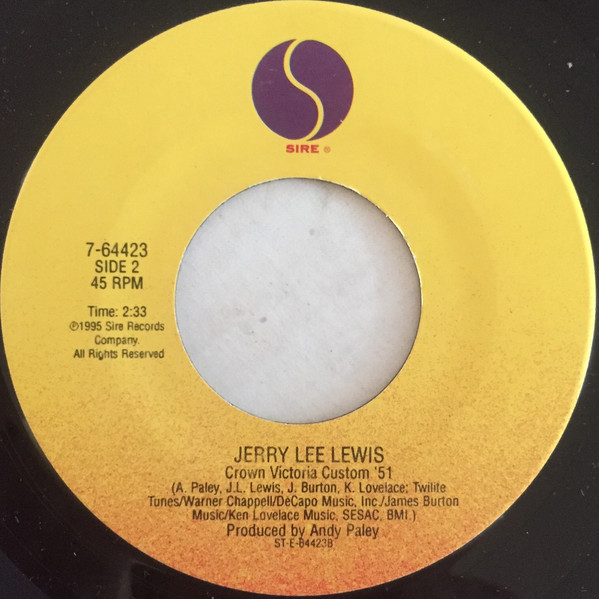

Single by Jerry Lee Lewis

from the album Young Blood
- A-side: "Goosebumps"
- Released: 1995
- Genre: Rock
- Length: 3:05
- Label: Sire Records
- Songwriters: Jerry Lee Lewis; James Burton; Andy Paley; Kenny Lovelace
- Producer: Andy Paley

"Crown Victoria Custom '51" is a song co-written by Jerry Lee Lewis and released as a B side single by Lewis in the U.S. in 1995 on Sire Records. The song was from the Young Blood album released that same year.

== Background ==
"Crown Victoria Custom '51" was recorded for Sire Records in the U.S. and was released as a 7" 45 B side single backed with "Goosebumps" in 1995 as 7-64423. The recording was produced by Andy Paley. The music and lyrics were written by Jerry Lee Lewis, James Burton, Andy Paley, and Kenny Lovelace. The song was published by Twilite Tunes, Warner Chappell, DeCapo Music Inc., James Burton Music, and Ken Lovelace Music. The song originally appeared on the Young Blood album. The recording was included on the 2006 3 disc career retrospective Half a Century of Hits as part of the Legends of American Music series by Time-Life Music.

The theme of the song is a 1951 Ford Victoria V8 coupe, a model based on the 1949 Ford. The Victoria hardtop had a "dual-bullet" grille and heavy chrome bumpers. A new "turn-key" ignition and front suspension featuring independent coil springs were also added. The head room was 36.1 inches. It was a new, post-war streamlined car model which could be customized into a hot rod. The Ford Crown Victoria model was produced in 1955. The opening and closing verse emphasizes the continuing popularity of the 1951 model: "Born in Detroit City back in '51 / She still looks pretty and she's loads of fun / Through thick and thin she's been my only one / It's my Crown Victoria Custom '51".

Jerry Lee Lewis performs a piano solo followed by an electric guitar solo by James Burton.

The recording is featured in the 1999 film A Texas Funeral starring Martin Sheen and Robert Patrick.

The song was favorably reviewed in Rolling Stone: "Whether reclaiming Hank Williams' wry 'I'll Never Get Out of This World Alive' or bragging about his hot rod — or is it his woman? — on 'Crown Victoria Custom '51,' Lewis is in high gear. He revels in the signatures of his fine madness, tossing random glissandi from his piano and shouting lyrics in a voice scuffed yet steel tipped."

== Album appearances ==
"Crown Victoria Custom '51" appeared on the following albums:

- Young Blood, Jerry Lee Lewis, Sire Records, 1995
- Grooves, Volume Ten, Various Artists, Time-Life Music/BMG, 1996
- Legends of American Music. Half a Century of Hits, Jerry Lee Lewis, Time-Life Music, 2006

== Sources ==
- Bonomo, Joe (2009). Jerry Lee Lewis: Lost and Found. New York: Continuum Books.
- Tosches, Nick (1982). Hellfire. New York: Grove Press.
- Gutterman, Jimmy (1991). Rockin' My Life Away: Listening to Jerry Lee Lewis. Nashville: Rutledge Hill Press.
- Gutterman, Jimmy (1993). The Jerry Lee Lewis Anthology: All Killer, No Filler. Rhino Records.
- Lewis, Myra; Silver, Murray (1981). Great Balls of Fire: The Uncensored Story of Jerry Lee Lewis. William Morrow/Quill/St. Martin's Press.
- Legends of American Music. Half a Century of Hits. Jerry Lee Lewis. Time-Life Music. 2006.
