= Sometimes a Memory Ain't Enough =

Studio album by Jerry Lee Lewis
- Released: 1973
- Recorded: Nashville, Tennessee
- Genre: Country
- Length: 32:11
- Label: Mercury
- Producer: Stan Kesler

Jerry Lee Lewis chronology
The Session (1973)	Sometimes a Memory Ain't Enough (1973)	Southern Roots: Back Home to Memphis (1973)

Singles from Sometimes a Memory Ain't Enough
- 1. "Sometimes a Memory Ain't Enough" Released: September 8, 1973; 2. "I'm Left, You're Right, She's Gone" Released: January 10, 1974

Sometimes a Memory Ain't Enough is a studio album by American musician and pianist Jerry Lee Lewis, released on Mercury Records in 1973.

The title song, "Sometimes a Memory Ain't Enough", was another Top 10 for Lewis, peaking at number 6 on the Billboard country singles chart on December 8, 1973 after 14 weeks on the chart.

== Track listing ==
No.	Title	Writer(s)	Length
1.	"Sometimes a Memory Ain't Enough"	Stan Kesler	2:56
2.	"Ride Me Down Easy"	Billy Joe Shaver	2:50
3.	"Mama's Hands"	Frank Dycus; Larry Kingston	3:46
4.	"What My Woman Can't Do"	George Jones; Earl Montgomery; Billy Sherrill	2:29
5.	"My Cricket and Me"	Leon Russell	2:11
6.	"I'm Left, You're Right, She's Gone"	Stan Kesler; Bill Taylor	2:21
7.	"Honky Tonk Wine"	Mack Vickery	4:37
8.	"Falling to the Bottom"		2:38
9.	"I Think I Need to Pray"	Cecil Harrelson; Taylor	2:45
10.	"Mornin' After Baby Let Me Down"	Ray Griff	3:01
11.	"Keep Me from Blowing Away"	Paul Craft	2:37
Total length:			32:11
