= Hey Mr. DJ (Van Morrison song) =

Single by Van Morrison

Single by Van Morrison

from the album Down the Road
- A-side: "Hey Mr. DJ"
- B-side: "Someone Like You" and "Bright Side of the Road"
- Released: 2002
- Recorded: 2000
- Genre: Blues, R&B
- Length: 3:45
- Label: Polydor
- Songwriter: Van Morrison
- Producer: Van Morrison

Van Morrison singles chronology
"Let's Talk About Us" (2000)	"Hey Mr. DJ" (2002)	"Meet Me in the Indian Summer" (2002)

"Hey Mr. DJ" is a song written by Van Morrison and recorded on his 2002 album, Down the Road. It was released as a single in the United Kingdom and charted at number fifty-eight. The single includes two Morrison compositions as the B-side; both have been included in the compilation album Still on Top - The Greatest Hits.

The Rolling Stone reviewer, David Fricke, said, "'Hey Mr. DJ' is a requiem for the one-on-one electricity of pre-Clear Channel radio, swinging with sweet brass and the iconic echo of Sam Cooke's 'Having a Party'."

== Recording history ==
The song was originally recorded in 2000 with Linda Gail Lewis, intended for an album entitled Choppin' Wood. Before the release of the album, Lewis' contributions to the song were removed and string and vocal overdubs were added.

== Personnel ==
- Van Morrison - acoustic guitar, vocals
- John Allair - Hammond organ
- Crawford Bell - backing vocals
- Olwin Bell - backing vocals
- Lee Goodall - tenor and alto saxophones
- Mick Green - acoustic guitar, electric guitar
- Karen Hamill - backing vocals
- David Hayes - bass guitar, double bass
- Matt Holland - trumpet
- Bobby Irwin - drums
- Siobhan Pettit - backing vocals
- Johnny Scott - backing vocals
- Rosie Wetters - cello, string section leader
- Aine Whelan - backing vocals

== Appearances on other albums ==
- This song was included on the compilation album, The Best of Van Morrison Volume 3.
- "Hey Mr. DJ" is included on the 3CD limited edition of the 2007 compilation album, Still on Top - The Greatest Hits, as the opening song on the third CD.
