= Drinkin' Wine Spo-Dee-O-Dee =

Song by Stick McGhee

"Drinkin' Wine, Spo-Dee-O-Dee"

Single by Stick McGhee
- Genre: Blues, jump blues
- Label: Atlantic
- Songwriter: Stick McGhee

"Drinking Wine Spo-dee O'dee"

Single by Jerry Lee Lewis

from the album The Session
- A-side: "Drinking Wine Spo-dee O'dee" "Rock and Roll Medley"
- Released: 1973
- Genre: Rock 'n' roll, blues
- Label: Mercury
- Songwriter: Stick McGhee

Jerry Lee Lewis singles chronology
"Meat Man" / "Just a Little Bit" (1973)	"Drinking Wine Spo-dee O'dee" / "Rock and Roll Medley" (1973)	"Sometimes a Memory Ain't Enough" / "I Think I Need to Pray" (1973)

"Drinkin' Wine, Spo-Dee-O-Dee" is a jump blues song written by Stick McGhee and J. Mayo Williams in 1949 and originally recorded by "Stick” McGhee & His Buddies. It became an early hit for Atlantic Records, reaching No. 2 on the US R&B charts.

== Background ==
Picardie and Wade in their book Atlantic and the Godfathers of Rock and Roll explain how the Atlantic version came to be. Stick McGhee had recorded the song in January 1947 in New Orleans for Harlem Records, a label which went out of business in 1948. A distributor from New Orleans called Ahmet Ertegun at Atlantic Records to find out if the firm could supply 5,000 copies of the song. Ertegun could not but offered to make an exact copy of the record. He first had to find someone to sing it and remembered Brownie McGhee whom Ertegun had met in his "endless trips to Harlem. I called him up and he said he could do it, but as it happened, his brother Stick was staying with him, so he might as well remake his own record." The song was recorded that same night and went on to sell 400,000 copies.

== 1949 recordings ==
- The song charted on the US R&B chart by three different artists in 1949, Stick McGhee’s version ("Stick" McGhee & His Buddies) reached No. 2, Wynonie Harris's hit No. 4 and Lionel Hampton went up to No. 13.

== Other recordings ==
- The song was covered by Jerry Lee Lewis, whose recording reached number 41 on the Billboard Hot 100.
- Other cover versions were recorded by Big John Greer, Johnny Burnette, Mike Bloomfield's Electric Flag (as "Wine"), The Pirates without Johnny Kidd and Richard Thompson (as included on 1000 Years of Popular Music).

== Charts ==
Jerry Lee Lewis version

Chart (1973)	Peak position
U.S. Cash Box Country Singles	21
US Hot Country Songs (Billboard)	20
US Billboard Hot 100	41
