= The Memphis Beats =

Jerry Lee Lewis backing band

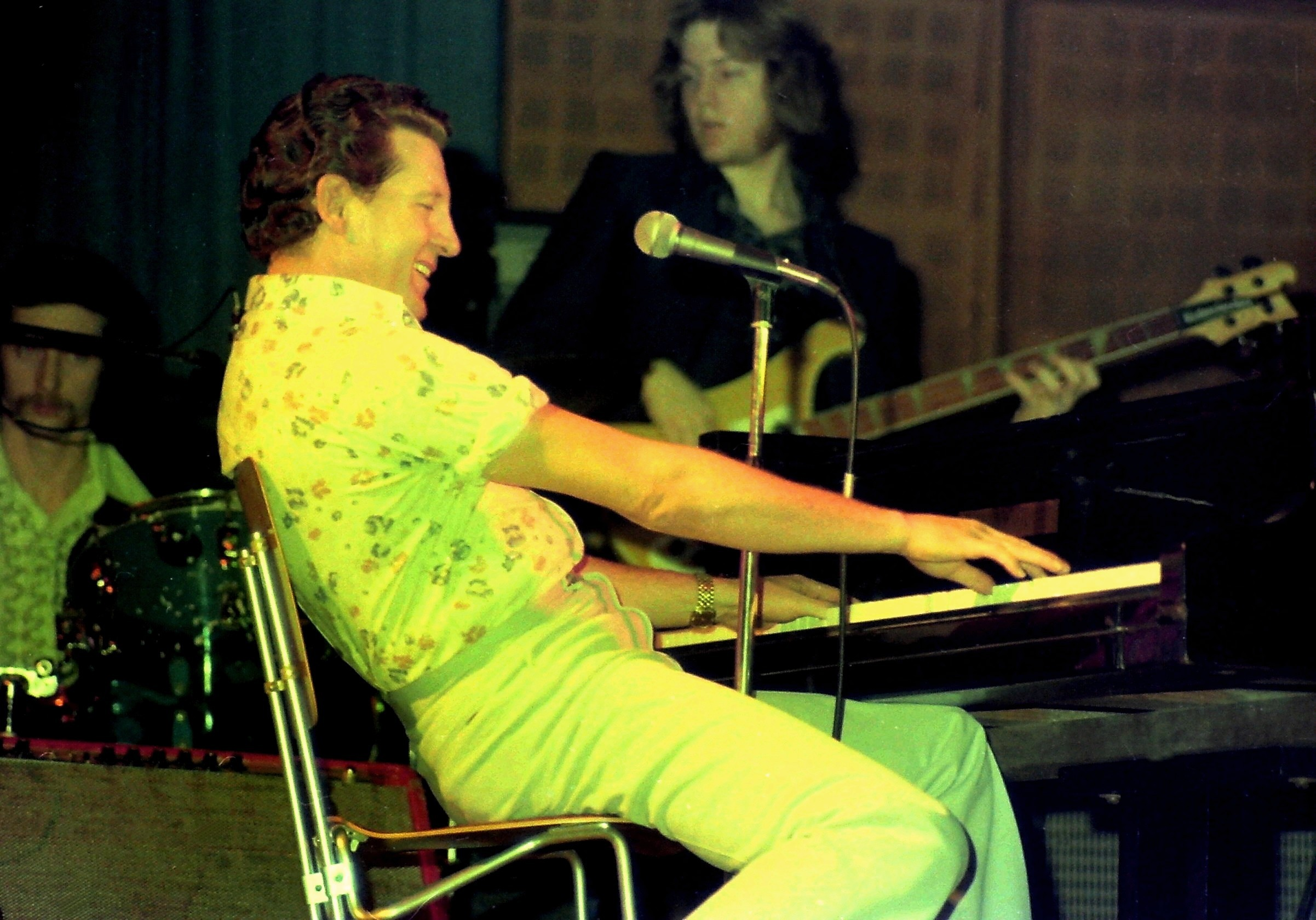
- Jerry Lee Lewis performing with The Memphis Beats, 1977

Background information
- Genres: Rock and roll; Rockabilly; Country; Gospel; Blues
- Years active: 1966–2019
- Labels: Smash; Mercury; Elektra; MCA
- Past members: Kenny Lovelace; Linda Gail Lewis; Morris Tarrant; Joel Schumacher; James Burton; Phoebe Lewis; B.B. Cunningham

The Memphis Beats was a backing band of Jerry Lee Lewis. The band was formed in 1966 and active before Lewis ended his performing career in 2019.

== History ==
While the Go-Go-Boys featuring Kenny Lovelace playing in Monroe, Louisiana, he met rock and roll legend Jerry Lee Lewis, through Jerry's sister Linda Gail Lewis. Lewis wanted to hire the whole band, but the others had families to look after, so Jerry hired Kenny. He has been guitarist and band leader of The Memphis Beats for more than 40 years. Lovelace has also recorded with artists such as Johnny Cash and Carl Perkins.

== Members ==
- Kenny Lovelace – guitar, fiddle, back vocals (1966–2019)
- Linda Gail Lewis — back vocals, piano (1966–1970s, 1986–2019)
- Morris Tarrant — drums (1966–1970)
- Joel Schumacher — guitar, bass guitar (1976–1983, 1986–1989)
- James Burton — guitar (1970s–1990s)
- Phoebe Lewis — back vocals (1980s–2000s)
- B. B. Cunningham — bass guitar (1997–2012)
