= Jerry Lee Keeps Rockin' =

Studio album by Jerry Lee Lewis
- Released: October 3, 1978
- Recorded: 1977−78
- Venues: Nashville, Tennessee
- Genres: Country, rock and roll
- Label: Mercury
- Producer: Jerry Kennedy

Jerry Lee Lewis chronology
Country Memories (1977)	Jerry Lee Keeps Rockin' (1978)	Jerry Lee Lewis (1979)

Jerry Lee Keeps Rockin' is the thirty-fourth studio album by American musician and pianist Jerry Lee Lewis, released on Mercury Records in 1978.

== Track listing ==
1. "I'll Find It Where I Can" (Michael Clark, Zack Van Arsdale)
2. "Don't Let the Stars Get in Your Eyes" (Slim Willet)
3. "Sweet Little Sixteen" (Chuck Berry)
4. "Last Cheaters Waltz" (Sonny Throckmorton)
5. "Wild and Wooly Ways" (Bob Morrison, Alan Rush)
6. "Blue Suede Shoes" (Carl Perkins)
7. "I Hate You" (Leroy Daniels, Dan Penn)
8. "Arkansas Seesaw" (Michael Bacon, Thomas Cain)
9. "Lucille" (Albert Collins, Richard Penniman)
10. "Pee Wee's Place" (Duke Faglier)
11. "Before the Night Is Over" (Ben Peters)

== Personnel ==
- Jerry Lee Lewis - lead vocals
- Janie Fricke, Ginger Holladay, Millie Kirkham, The Jordanaires, Bergen White, Trish Williams - backing vocals
- Mike Leech - bass guitar
- Jerry Carrigan, Buddy Harman - drums
- Kenny Lovelace - fiddle
- Jimmy Capps, Johnny Christopher, Ray Edenton, Duke Faglier, Jerry Kennedy, Grady Martin, Jerry Shook, Pete Wade, Chip Young - guitar
- Hargus "Pig" Robbins - piano
- Harold Bradley - 6-string bass guitar
- Pete Drake, Weldon Myrick - steel guitar
- George Binkley III, Marvin Chantry, Carl Gorodetzky, Lennie Haight, Sheldon Kurland, Christian Teal, Samuel Terranova, Stephanie Wool - strings
- Bergen White - string arranger
- Bob Moore - upright bass
