= Birth of Rock and Roll =

- Picture sleeve for most territorial editions

Single by Carl Perkins

from the album Class of '55
- B-side: "Rock and Roll (Fais-Do-Do)"
- Released: May 1986
- Recorded: Sun Studio
- Genre: Rockabilly, country, country rock, rock and roll
- Length: 4:21
- Label: Smash/America
- Songwriter(s): Carl Perkins; Greg Perkins
- Producer(s): Chips Moman

Carl Perkins singles chronology
"(Let's Get) Dixiefried" (1973)	"Birth of Rock and Roll" (1986)	"Class of '55" (1987)

"Birth of Rock and Roll" is a 1986 song written by Carl Perkins and Greg Perkins. The song was featured on the Class of '55 album which included performances with Johnny Cash, Roy Orbison, and Jerry Lee Lewis. "Birth of Rock and Roll" was released as a 7" single with a picture sleeve, 885 760–7, on the Smash/America label copyrighted by PolyGram Records produced by Chips Moman. The single reached No. 31 on the Billboard country chart and No. 44 on the Canadian country chart in 1986. The B side was "Rock and Roll (Fais-Do-Do)" which featured Johnny Cash, Jerry Lee Lewis, and Roy Orbison. The theme of the song “Birth of Rock and Roll" is about how "Memphis gave birth to rock and roll" in the 1950s at Sun Records. A video of the song was also made featuring Carl Perkins, Jerry Lee Lewis, and Ronnie Wood of The Rolling Stones as they drove to the historic Sun studios in Memphis, Tennessee in a white Cadillac convertible.

== Background ==
The song was part of the 1985 Class of '55 sessions that marked the 30th anniversary of the emergence of rock and roll when Elvis Presley, Carl Perkins, Johnny Cash, and Jerry Lee Lewis began their careers at Sun Records in Memphis. The sessions were also a reunion of the Million Dollar Quartet, Perkins, Lewis, Cash, and Elvis Presley. With the death of Presley in 1977, Roy Orbison took his place at the sessions. They were the surviving members of the 1955-1956 period in the history of Sun Records when the label had its greatest chart and sales success. In the song, Perkins recounts that early history when Sun was instrumental in the emergence of rock and roll. He sings: "I was here when it happened/ I watched Memphis give birth to rock and roll." He described how Elvis Presley's first recording session at Sun had been a catalyst for the emergence of the rock and roll genre. He also emphasized his own role in that evolution. He then traced that evolution to the emergence of The Beatles and The Rolling Stones in 1964. They continued the evolution of rock and roll begun at Sun. Finally, he concluded that critics who argued that rock and roll was "the devil's music" and that it would not last as a form or genre of music had been proved wrong.

== Recording session ==
The song was recorded at Sun Studios. The sessions reunited musicians from the 1950s such as drummer W.S. Holland, musician and engineer Jack Clement, and Rick Nelson.

== Chart performance ==
Chart (1986)	Peak position
U.S. Billboard Hot Country Singles	31
Canadian RPM Country Tracks	44

== Sources ==
- Guterman, Jimmy. (1998.) "Carl Perkins." In The Encyclopedia of Country Music. Paul Kingsbury, Ed. New York: Oxford University Press. pp. 412–413.
- Naylor, Jerry; Halliday, Steve. The Rockabilly Legends: They Called It Rockabilly Long Before They Called It Rock and Roll. Milwaukee, Wisc.: Hal Leonard. ISBN 9781423420422. OCLC 71812792.
- Pareles, Jon (20 January 1998). "Carl Perkins Dies at 65; Rockabilly Pioneer Wrote 'Blue Suede Shoes'". The New York Times. p. B12.
- Perkins, Carl; McGee, David (1996). Go, Cat, Go!. New York: Hyperion Press. ISBN 0-7868-6073-1. OCLC 32895064..
