= End of the Road (Jerry Lee Lewis song) =

Single by Jerry Lee Lewis
- A-side: "Crazy Arms"
- Released: December 1956
- Recorded: 1956
- Genre: Rock and roll, rockabilly, country
- Length: 1:54
- Label: Sun 296
- Songwriter: Jerry Lee Lewis
- Producers: Sam Phillips, Jerry Lee Lewis

"End of the Road" is a song written and performed by musician Jerry Lee Lewis. Recorded in 1956, and released as a single in December of that year on Sun Records, the single was backed with Lewis' cover of the Ray Price song "Crazy Arms". The recording was reissued in 1979 as a 7" 45 single as Sun 14 as part of the Sun Golden Treasure Series. The song was also released in Canada in 1956 as a 45 single on Quality Records.

== Background ==
"End of the Road" was recorded in November, 1956 at Sun Records studios at 706 Union, Memphis, Tennessee. The personnel were: Jerry Lee Lewis on vocals and piano; Roland Janes on guitar; and Jimmy Van Eaton on drums. The flip side was "Crazy Arms". The single was Jerry Lee Lewis' first release on Sun Records. The single was released in December, 1956 as Sun 259 with the Matrix # U-230 as by Jerry Lee Lewis And His Pumping Piano. The song was published by Knox Music, Inc., which released sheet music for the song.

In Canada, the song was released as a 45 single in 1956 as Quality K1590 with "Crazy Arms" as the flip side.

== Album appearances ==
1956 sheet music cover, Knox Music, New York.

Jerry Lee Lewis recorded a new version of the song for Smash Records which appeared on the 1969 compilation album Jerry Lee Lewis: The Golden Rock Hits of Jerry Lee Lewis and the 1974 collection Golden Hits

The 1956 Sun Records recording appeared on the 1976 Sun Records compilation album The Original Jerry Lee Lewis which was released by the Sun Record Company.

In 1985, Rhino Records released the song as part of the compilation Milestones and on the 1993 collection All Killer, No Filler: The Anthology.

The Collectables label released the song in 1999 on the CD collection Jerry Lee Lewis: Original Golden Hits, Vols. 1-2 and in 2000 on the compilation album The Very Best of Jerry Lee Lewis.

In 2004, Tom Jones and Jools Holland released their recording of the song on the CD album issued by Radar and Warner Strategic Marketing.

In 2007, the song was featured on the live album Last Man Standing Live, recorded in a duet with Tom Jones.

The Swedish band The Replacements recorded the song on their 2019 album Real Rock 'n' Roll.

== Sources ==
- Bonomo, Joe (2009). Jerry Lee Lewis: Lost and Found. New York: Continuum Books.
- Legends of American Music. Half a Century of Hits. Jerry Lee Lewis. Time-Life Music. 2006.
- Tosches, Nick (1982). Hellfire. New York: Grove Press.
- Gutterman, Jimmy (1991). Rockin' My Life Away: Listening to Jerry Lee Lewis. Nashville: Rutledge Hill Press.
- Gutterman, Jimmy (1993). The Jerry Lee Lewis Anthology: All Killer, No Filler. Rhino Records.
- Lewis, Myra; Silver, Murray (1981). Great Balls of Fire: The Uncensored Story of Jerry Lee Lewis. William Morrow/Quill/St. Martin's Press.
