= Country Memories =

Studio album by Jerry Lee Lewis
- Released: 1977
- Recorded: 1976−77
- Venues: Nashville, Tennessee
- Genre: Country
- Label: Mercury
- Producer: Jerry Kennedy

Jerry Lee Lewis chronology
Country Class (1976)	Country Memories (1977)	Jerry Lee Keeps Rockin' (1978)

Professional ratings
Review scores
Source	Rating
AllMusic	3/5 stars

Country Memories is a studio album by American musician and pianist Jerry Lee Lewis, released on Mercury Records in 1977. It peaked at No. 21 on Billboard's Top Country Albums chart.

== Track listing ==
1. "Middle Age Crazy" (Sonny Throckmorton)
2. "Let's Say Goodbye Like We Said Hello (In a Friendly Kind of Way)" (Jimmie Skinner, Ernest Tubb)
3. "Who's Sorry Now?" (Bert Kalmar, Harry Ruby, Ted Snyder)
4. "Jealous Heart" (Jenny Carson)
5. "Georgia on My Mind" (Hoagy Carmichael, Stuart Gorrell)
6. "Come On In" (Bobby Braddock)
7. "As Long as We Live" (Bob McDill)
8. "(You'd Think by Now) I'd Be Over You" (Jerry Foster, Bill Rice)
9. "Country Memories" (Jerry Foster, Bill Rice)
10. "What's So Good About Goodbye" (Bob McDill)
11. "Tennessee Saturday Night" (Billy Hughes)
