= Last Man Standing (Jerry Lee Lewis album) =

Studio album by Jerry Lee Lewis
- Released: September 26, 2006
- Recorded: December 2004−May 2006
- Studios: Phillips Studio and Sun Studio in Memphis, Tennessee and various other studios
- Genres: Rock and roll; country; blues; boogie-woogie; folk
- Length: 66:43
- Labels: Artists First, Shangri-La
- Producers: Steve Bing; Jimmy Ripp

Jerry Lee Lewis chronology
The (Complete) Session (2006)	Last Man Standing (2006)	Last Man Standing Live (2007)

Last Man Standing is the thirty-ninth studio album released by American rock and roll pioneer Jerry Lee Lewis in September 2006. The album consists of duets between Lewis and some of the biggest names in both rock and country music, past and present. The title derives from the generation of 1950s Sun Studios recording artists such as Johnny Cash, Roy Orbison, Charlie Rich, Carl Perkins, and Elvis Presley—all of whom had died, leaving Lewis the "last man standing". Lewis died in October 2022, sixteen years and one month following the album's release. Following the success of the album, a DVD Last Man Standing Live was released featuring similar duets with famous artists.

== Track listing ==
1. "Rock and Roll" (John Paul Jones, John Bonham, Jimmy Page, Robert Plant) – 2:14
  - With Jimmy Page
2. "Before the Night Is Over" (Ben Peters) – 3:39
  - With B. B. King
3. "Pink Cadillac" (Bruce Springsteen) – 3:55
  - With Bruce Springsteen
4. "Evening Gown" (Mick Jagger) – 3:57
  - With Mick Jagger and Ron Wood
5. "You Don't Have to Go" (Jimmy Reed) – 4:00
  - With Neil Young
6. "Twilight" (Robbie Robertson) – 2:48
  - With Robbie Robertson
7. "Travelin' Band" (John Fogerty) – 2:01
  - With John Fogerty
8. "That Kind of Fool" (Mack Vickery) – 4:14
  - With Keith Richards
9. "Sweet Little Sixteen" (Chuck Berry) – 3:04
  - With Ringo Starr
10. "Just a Bummin' Around" (Pete Graves) – 2:43
  - With Merle Haggard
11. "Honky Tonk Woman" (Jagger/Richards) – 2:21
  - With Kid Rock
12. "What's Made Milwaukee Famous (Has Made a Loser Out of Me)" (Glenn Sutton) – 2:39
  - With Rod Stewart
13. "Don't Be Ashamed of Your Age" (Cindy Walker, Bob Wills) – 1:59
  - With George Jones
14. "A Couple More Years" (Dennis Locorriere, Shel Silverstein) – 5:13
  - With Willie Nelson
15. "Old Glory" (Paul Roberts, Shelby Darnell, Jerry Lee Lewis) – 2:05
  - With Toby Keith
16. "Trouble in Mind" (Richard M. Jones) – 3:49
  - With Eric Clapton
17. "I Saw Her Standing There" (John Lennon, Paul McCartney) – 2:21
  - With Little Richard
18. "Lost Highway" (Leon Payne) – 2:59
  - With Delaney Bramlett
19. "Hadacol Boogie" (Bill Nettles) – 3:18
  - With Buddy Guy
20. "What Makes the Irish Heart Beat" (Van Morrison) – 4:12
  - With Don Henley
21. "The Pilgrim Ch. 33" (Kris Kristofferson) – 3:00
  - With Kris Kristofferson

Bonus tracks

The album was released with several promotional download-only tracks depending on the venue at which the album was purchased. For physical retail outlets, the bonus track was available from their official web site.

- "Before the Night Is Over" (Rhapsody)
- "Bright Lights, Big City" (Wal-Mart)
- "Don't Put No Headstones on My Grave" (iTunes)
- "I Don't Want to Be Lonely Tonight" (URGE)
- "Last Cheaters' Waltz" (Target)
- "Mexicali Rose" (Country Music Television)
- "Trouble in Mind" (Napster)
- "Why You Been Gone So Long?" (Best Buy)
- "You Belong to Me" (Best Buy)
- "A Couple More Years" — Live

== Personnel ==
In addition to the guest stars, the album features Kenny Lovelace and producer Jimmy Rip on guitar, James "Hutch" Hutchinson on bass, and Jim Keltner playing drums. The liner notes were written by Peter Guralnick. Kris Kristofferson's track produced by J. Carter Tutwiler at NoCanBeat Studios and mixed by Steve Gamberoni.

== Unreleased songs ==
Lewis recorded several more songs for the album than were released, including:

- "Cry" (Churchill Kohlman)
- "Last Night I Heard You Call My Name"
- "Miss the Mississippi and You"
  - A re-recording of the song that first appeared on Lewis' 1995 album Young Blood, featuring no backing.
- "Roll Over Beethoven" (Chuck Berry)
  - With the band, supplemented by Ringo Starr, Ivan Neville, James "Hutch" Hutchinson and Nils Lofgren.
- "You Can't Catch Me" (Chuck Berry)

== Critical reception ==
Professional ratings
Review scores
Source	Rating
AllMusic	4/5 stars
Mojo	4/5 stars
PopMatters	9/10
Rolling Stone	4/5 stars

Last Man Standing received very positive reviews from critics. Stephen Thomas Erlewine of AllMusic called the recording, "a record that celebrates life, both in its joys and sorrows, and it's hard not to see it as nothing short of inspiring" and the editorial team of the site gave it four out of five stars. The same score was awarded by Gavin Edwards in Rolling Stone, praising the performance by writing, "his throat is in better shape than you might expect, most of his command now comes from the slamming, swinging passion of his barrelhouse piano". For PopMatters, Vladimir Wormwood gave the album seven out of 10, summing up his review by focusing on the Merle Haggard duet "Just Bummin' Around": "It is a portrait of the aging musician with the showmanship removed. Long live Jerry Lee Lewis".

== Chart performance ==
Chart performance for Last Man Standing
Chart (2006)	Peak position
Australian Albums Chart	46
Austrian Albums Charts	34
Danish Albums Chart	10
Dutch Albums Chart	49
French Albums Chart	67
Norwegian Albums Chart	26
Swedish Albums Chart	7
US Billboard 200	26
US Billboard Independent Albums	1
US Billboard Top Country Albums	4
US Billboard Top Rock Albums	8
