= You're the Only Star in My Blue Heaven =

1935 song by Gene Autry

"You're the Only Star in my Blue Heaven"

Single by Gene Autry
- B-side: Mexicali Rose
- Published: November 30, 1936
- Released: April 1936
- Recorded: December 5, 1935
- Studio: Furniture Mart ARC Studio, 666 N Lake Shore Drive, 21st Floor, Chicago
- Genre: Hillbilly, Western
- Length: 2:50
- Label: Melotone 6-05-59
- Songwriter: Gene Autry

Starting as the B-side of Gene Autry's "Mexicali Rose", penned by Autry, 'You're the Only Star in My Blue Heaven' was also popular in Hillbilly jukeboxes and radios in the mid-late 1930s. After the Columbia Broadcasting System, Inc. (CBS) purchased ARC and Gene's contract in December 1938. (soon renaming the company "Columbia Records"), 'Star' was re-recorded on April 13, 1939 at Columbia's new Hollywood studio, located at KNX Radio, Sunset and Gower (Autry and Bob Wills would record many of their great 1940s Okeh and Columbia hits at this location). The younger version is over 20 seconds shorter.

At first, only Roy Acuff and his Crazy Tennesseans recorded the song (Roy on October 21, 1936)., and in 1938 by The Delmore Brothers. It was also recorded by Elvis Presley and Jerry Lee Lewis during the Million Dollar Quartet sessions at Sun Recording Studios. Amongst other recordings are those by Connee Boswell (1939), Dick Todd (1938), and Camera Obscura (2009).
