= You Win Again (album) =

Studio album by Van Morrison and Linda Gail Lewis
- Released: 3 October 2000
- Recorded: 2000
- Studio: The Wool Hall, Bath, England
- Genre: Rock, country, country rock
- Length: 42:00
- Label: Virgin
- Producer: Van Morrison

Van Morrison and Linda Gail Lewis chronology
The Skiffle Sessions - Live In Belfast 1998 (2000)	You Win Again (2000)	Down the Road (2002)

Singles from You Win Again
- 1. "Let's Talk About Us" b/w "Singing the Blues"/"The Ballad of Jesse James" Released: September 2000

Professional ratings
Review scores
Source	Rating
AllMusic	3/5 stars
Entertainment Weekly	B+
Rolling Stone	3/5 stars

You Win Again is the twenty-eighth studio album by Northern Irish singer-songwriter Van Morrison. It is a duet album with Linda Gail Lewis that was released in 2000 (see 2000 in music) by Virgin Records. The album was recorded at The Wool Hall, Bath, England.

== Track listing ==
1. "Let's Talk About Us" (Otis Blackwell) – 2:53
2. "You Win Again" (Hank Williams) – 3:01
3. "Jambalaya (On the Bayou)" (Hank Williams) – 2:57
4. "Crazy Arms" (Ralph Mooney, Chuck Seals) – 3:37
5. "Old Black Joe" (Stephen Foster; as performed by Jerry Lee Lewis) – 3:21
6. "Think Twice Before You Go" (Al Smith) – 2:38
7. "No Way Pedro" (Van Morrison) – 3:44
8. "Shot of Rhythm and Blues" (Terry Thompson) – 3:59
9. "Real Gone Lover" (Dave Bartholomew, Ruth Durand, Joseph Robichaux) – 3:09
10. "Why Don't You Love Me (Like You Used to Do)?" (Hank Williams) – 2:23
11. "Cadillac" (Ellas McDaniel) – 2:33
12. "Baby (You've Got What It Takes)" (Clyde Otis, Murray Stein, Brook Benton) – 3:45
13. "Boogie Chillen" (John Lee Hooker) – 4:00

== Personnel ==
- Van Morrison – vocals, acoustic and electric guitars, harmonica
- Linda Gail Lewis – vocal, piano
- Ned Edwards – electric guitar, mandolin, background vocals
- Paul Godden – steel guitar
- Lee Goodall – saxophone
- Pete Hurley – bass
- Colin Griffin – drums

== Charts ==
Album – UK Album Chart (United Kingdom)

Year	Chart	Position
2000	UK Album Chart	34

Album – Billboard (North America)

Year	Chart	Position
2000	The Billboard 200	161
