= The Survivors (album) =

Live album by Johnny Cash, Carl Perkins, and Jerry Lee Lewis
- Released: April 1982
- Recorded: April 23, 1981
- Genre: Country; rockabilly; rock and roll; gospel
- Length: 42:17
- Label: Columbia
- Producer: Rodney Crowell

Johnny Cash chronology
Encore (1981)	The Survivors (1982)	The Adventures of Johnny Cash (1982)

Jerry Lee Lewis chronology
Killer Country (1980)	The Survivors (1982)	My Fingers Do The Talkin' (1983)

Professional ratings
Review scores
Source	Rating
AllMusic	2/5 stars
Robert Christgau	B−
Rolling Stone	3/5 stars

The Survivors is a live album by country/rockabilly musicians Johnny Cash, Carl Perkins, and Jerry Lee Lewis, released in 1982 on Columbia Records.

== Track listing ==
Side one
No.	Title	Writer(s)	Length
1.	"Get Rhythm"	Johnny Cash	3:07
2.	"I Forgot to Remember to Forget"	Charlie Feathers, Stan Kesler	2:44
3.	"Goin' Down the Road Feelin' Bad"	Traditional	2:59
4.	"That Silver-Haired Daddy of Mine"	Gene Autry, Jimmy Long	3:10
5.	"Matchbox"	Carl Perkins	3:18
6.	"I'll Fly Away"	Albert E. Brumley	4:02

Side two
No.	Title	Writer(s)	Length
1.	"Whole Lotta Shakin' Goin' On"	Dave "Curly" Williams, Sunny David	4:04
2.	"Rockin' My Life Away"	Mack Vickery	2:54
3.	"Blue Suede Shoes"	Carl Perkins	3:07
4.	"Peace in the Valley"	Thomas A. Dorsey	4:51
5.	"Will the Circle Be Unbroken"	A.P. Carter	4:36
6.	"I Saw the Light"	Hank Williams	3:25

== Personnel ==
- Johnny Cash – Vocals, Guitar, Arranger, Liner Notes
- Jerry Lee Lewis – Vocals, Piano
- Carl Perkins – Vocals, Guitar
- Jerry Hensley, Kenneth Lovelace, Bob Wootton – Electric Guitar
- Marty Stuart – Guitar, Mandolin
- Earl Ball – Piano
- Jack Hale Jr., Bob Lewin – Trumpet, French Horn
- W.S. Holland – Drums
- Henry Strzelecki – Bass

=== Additional personnel ===
- Lou Robin – Executive producer
- Rodney Crowell – Producer, Mixing
- Bradley Hartman, Ron Treat – Mixing
- Steve Hoffman – Mastering
- Bill Johnson – Art director
- Kevin Gray – CD preparation
- Murray Brenman – Reissue design
