= The Firebirds =

English rock band

- Origin: Bristol, England
- Genres: Rock and Roll, Doo-wop, Rockabilly
- Years active: 1981–present
- Members: Jim Plummer; Dan Plummer; Richie Lorriman; Paul Willmott
- Past members: John Plummer; Pagan(ydd) Gould; Jason Bryant
- Website: www.thefirebirds.com

The Firebirds are a British rock band from Bristol, founded in 1981 by their former frontman John Plummer. The band now consists of four musicians; Jim Plummer, Dan Plummer, Richie Lorriman and Paul Willmott. The band also featured Jason Bryant and Paganydd Gould. The band has backed artists such as Jerry Lee Lewis, Ray Campi, Charlie Gracie and Sleepy LaBeef.

In 1992, they performed at the official opening of Disneyland Paris, where they were the only British band to perform.

The Firebirds also starred in the Memorial concert at the Colston Hall in Bristol to mark 40 years of Eddie Cochran's death, in which Jim Plummer played the part of Cochran's last gig at the Bristol Hippodrome.

Over recent years The Firebirds toured Belgium, the Netherlands, France, Italy, Switzerland, Germany, Denmark and Spain, as well as a successful tour in the United States. They were the only British band to play the 2002 Rockabilly Festival, which marked the 50th anniversary of Sun Records and 25th anniversary of Elvis Presley's death.

They have released eleven albums.

== Discography ==
Album title	Year of release
Good Rocking Tonight	1989
Taking By Storm	1991
Too Hot To Handle	1993
This Is It	1994
Movin' On	1996
Let's Go	1999
Rock 'n' Roll Special with Linda Gail Lewis	2001
Dance Girl Dance	2004
Doo Wop Volume 1	2007
Doo Wop Volume 2	2011
High Fidelity	2015
