= Sometimes a Memory Ain't Enough (song) =

Single by Jerry Lee Lewis

from the album Sometimes a Memory Ain't Enough
- A-side: "Sometimes a Memory Ain't Enough" "I Think I Need to Pray"
- Released: 1973
- Recorded: 1973
- Genre: Country
- Length: 2:51
- Label: Mercury
- Songwriter: Stan Kesler
- Producer: Stan Kesler

Jerry Lee Lewis singles chronology
"Drinkin' Wine Spo-Dee-O-Dee" / "Rock and Roll Medley" (1970)	"Sometimes a Memory Ain't Enough" / "I Think I Need to Pray" (1973)	"I'm Left, You're Right, She's Gone" / "I've Fallen to the Bottom" (1974)

"Sometimes a Memory Ain't Enough" is a song written by Stan Kesler and originally recorded by Jerry Lee Lewis for his Kesler-produced Mercury Records' album of the same name (1973). It was also released as a single (with "I Think I Need to Pray" on the flip side), reaching number 3 on the Cash Box Country Singles chart and number 6 on the Billboard country chart.

== Track listing ==
7" single (Mercury 73423, 1973)
No.	Title	Length
1.	"Sometimes a Memory Ain't Enough"
2.	"I Think I Need To Pray"

Notes: "From Mercury's album Sometimes a Memory Ain't Enough SRM-1-677"

== Charts ==
Chart (1973)	Peak position
U.S. Cash Box Country Singles	3
US Hot Country Songs (Billboard)	6
