= I-40 Country =

Studio album by Jerry Lee Lewis
- Released: 1974
- Recorded: Nashville, Tennessee
- Genre: Country
- Length: 31:23
- Label: Mercury
- Producer: Stan Kesler

Jerry Lee Lewis chronology
Southern Roots: Back Home to Memphis (1973)	I-40 Country (1974)	Boogie Woogie Country Man (1975)

I-40 Country is the twenty-ninth studio album by American musician and pianist Jerry Lee Lewis, released on the Mercury label in 1974.

== Track listing ==
No.	Title	Writer(s)	Length
1.	"He Can't Fill My Shoes"	Frank Dycus; Larry Kingston	2:36
2.	"Tell Tale Signs"	Alex Zanetis	2:28
3.	"A Picture from Life's Other Side"	Traditional; arranged by Jerry Lee Lewis	3:42
4.	"I Hate Goodbyes"	Jerry Foster; Bill Rice	2:33
5.	"I've Forgot More About You (Than He'll Ever Know)"	Cecil A. Null	3:06
6.	"Tomorrow's Taking My Baby Away"	Thomas LaVerne; Bill Taylor	3:19
7.	"Cold, Cold Morning Light"	LaVerne; Taylor	3:10
8.	"The Alcohol of Fame"	Buzz Rabin	2:30
9.	"Where Would I Be"	Ray Griff	3:04
10.	"Bluer Words"	Cile Davis; Clyde Pitts; J. Len Pitts	2:19
11.	"Room Full of Roses"	Tim Spencer	2:36
Total length:			31:23
