= Big John Greer =

American blues tenor saxophonist and vocalist (1923–1972)

John Marshall "Big John" Greer (November 21, 1923 – May 12, 1972) was an American blues tenor saxophonist and vocalist, best known for his recordings from 1948 to 1956, which included "Got You on My Mind" and "Bottle It Up and Go".

Born in Hot Springs, Arkansas, United States, Greer was a friend of Henry Glover from childhood, and both attended college at Alabama A&M together. Glover was playing in Lucky Millinder's band when Bull Moose Jackson left the group in 1948; Glover suggested that Greer be chosen as Jackson's replacement. Greer played with Bob Shad and appeared on Millinder's RCA recordings until 1950, when Millinder signed to King Records. Greer stayed with RCA and played with Wynonie Harris and Jackson among others. He sang lead vocals on his biggest hit, recorded in October 1951 "Got You On My Mind". In 1953, he switched to Groove Records, but did not make much impact on the American record charts there. In August 1954, he released "We Wanna See Santa Claus Do The Mambo", a Christmas hit to this day. In 1956, he finally signed with King, but only recorded for them for about a year. Greer also worked with Hal Singer and Bill Doggett.

By 1957, Greer had developed extended troubles with alcoholism, and he moved back to his home town of Hot Springs, Arkansas, where he died in 1972 at age 48.

== Discography ==
- "Long Tall Gal" / " Drinkin' Wine, Spo-Dee-O-Dee, Drinkin' Wine" (RCA Victor 50–0007, 1949)
- "Got You On My Mind" / "Woman is a Five Letter Word' (RCA Victor 47-4348, 1951)
- "Bottle It Up and Go" / "You'll Never Be Mine" (Groove G-0002, 1954)
- "Too Long" / "When the Roses Bloom in Lovers' Lane" (Groove G-0016, 1954)
- "Wait Till After Christmas" / "We Wanna See Santa Do the Mambo" (Groove G-0038, 1954)
- "Come Back Maybelline" / "Night Crawlin'" (Groove G-0119, 1955)

== CD releases ==
- Rockin' with Big John (Bear Family BCD-15554 [3CD], 1992)
- I'm the Fat Man 1949–1955 (Rev-Ola CRBAND-17, 2007)
- Blowin' & Rockin' 1949–1955 (Jasmine JASMCD-3227, 2021)
