= Crazy Arms =

Single by Ray Price
- B-side: "You Done Me Wrong"
- Released: April 1956
- Recorded: March 1, 1956
- Studio: Bradley Studios, Nashville, Tennessee
- Genre: Country
- Length: 2:35
- Label: Columbia 21510
- Songwriters: Ralph Mooney, Charles Seals

Ray Price singles chronology
"Run Boy" (1955)	"Crazy Arms" (1956)	"I've Got a New Heartache" (1956)

"Crazy Arms" is an American country song, which was a career-making hit for Ray Price. The song, released in May 1956, went on to become a number-one country hit that year, establishing Price's sound, and redefining honky-tonk music. It was Price's first number-one hit. The song was written in 1949 by pedal steel player Ralph Mooney and Charles "Chuck" Seals. In 1999, "Crazy Arms" by Ray Price was inducted into the Grammy Hall of Fame.

== Background ==
"Crazy Arms" first appeared in the style of a traditional country ballad. Ralph Mooney wrote the song in 1949 with Chuck Seals, at a time when he was playing in Wynn Stewart's band on the West Coast.

"When I was about 22 years old, I was a heavy drinker," Mooney wrote. "My wife and I and our baby girl lived in Las Vegas, Nevada, in 1949. Each night at the club where I played steel guitar, I would get so drunk that I almost had to crawl home. I never drank in the daytime. One day, my wife and I were uptown shopping, and I ran into a musician friend who invited me to have a drink and I did. That was all my wife could take of my drinking, so she left me and went home to her mama in Los Angeles. After she left on the bus, I sat down with my guitar and wrote 'Blue ain't the word for the way that I feel, and a storm is brewing in this heart of mine.' I wrote the whole song in a few minutes. I went back to Los Angeles to get my wife back a few days later."

In 1954 in Pasadena, California, Stewart recorded a demonstration version of the song on 78 rpm acetate, but it was never released. The story of the song continues with recollections by country singer Hank Cochran, who said that successful California baker Claude Caviness and his wife Marilyn Kaye both thought Kaye was a great singer, but that other musicians could tell she was not. Caviness formed the Pep record label to promote Kaye, hoping to find her a hit. Mooney sold "Crazy Arms" to Caviness, and Caviness released a duet version of the song on 45 rpm vinyl, catalog number PEP 102, featuring Kenny Brown and the Arkansas Ramblers, with accompanying vocals by Marilyn Kaye. This version of the song was fairly well received in Tampa, Florida, broadcast on radio station WALT by disc jockey Bob Martin, and when Ray Price toured through the station, Martin played him the record, recommending the song to Price. Price reworked the music and some of the lyrics, and recorded his own version on March 1, 1956, at Bradley Studios in Nashville. After the song became a hit for Price, Caviness contacted Price to tell him that he held the rights to the song. Caviness and Price joined forces in 1959 to publish music under Caviness' reworked Pamper label, with artist manager James Harrell "Hal" Smith as the third owner.

The up-and-coming Price, who already had several successful recordings by 1956, used "Crazy Arms" to establish himself as a star and to introduce fans to his new Texas shuffle sound, fiddle, pedal steel guitar, and walking electric bass, with a swinging 4/4 rhythm. Those hallmarks became part of many of Price's biggest hits throughout the mid- to late 1950s and early 1960s, and set a new standard for honky-tonk songs.

== Conflicting song origin ==
Mooney, a pedal steel player on many recordings for Waylon Jennings and Wynn Stewart for over 20 years and a member of the Strangers, said he got the idea for the song after his wife left him because of his drinking problem. In 2012, though, claims arose that relatively unknown songwriter, Paul Gilley from Kentucky (no relation to Mickey Gilley), wrote the lyrics and sold them outright to Mooney, who was living on the West Coast at the time and was a relatively unknown 22-year-old steel guitar player.

== Commercial performance ==
Price's version of "Crazy Arms" reached number one on each of the Billboard country music charts (jukebox, best sellers, and radio airplay) in June 1956 and has been credited with spending 20 weeks atop the chart; only three other songs spent longer at number one. In addition, Billboard named the song its number-one country single of 1956 in its year-end issue.

The song's run at number one (which came two years prior to the introduction of the all-encompassing Hot Country Songs chart in October 1958) was not matched until July 27, 2013, when "Cruise" by Florida Georgia Line matched its run at number one with 20 weeks. Only two songs since 1956 – "Walk On By" by Leroy Van Dyke (19 weeks, 1961–1962) and "Love's Gonna Live Here" by Buck Owens (16 weeks, 1963–1964) – had come reasonably close to matching the run of "Crazy Arms" before Florida Georgia Line.

== Cover versions ==
"Crazy Arms" has been covered many times by performers both in country music and other genres. In 1956, just weeks after its original release, the song was recorded at Sun Studios (Memphis) by a young Jerry Lee Lewis, marking the debut of the Killer's career. Some of the other notable names include Marion Worth, Bing Crosby (for his 1965 album Bing Crosby Sings the Great Country Hits), Louis Armstrong, Chuck Berry, the Andrews Sisters, Gram Parsons, Patsy Cline, Waylon Jennings, Trini Lopez, Mickey Gilley, Great Speckled Bird, Willie Nelson, Patty Loveless, Lucille Starr (RPM number five), Marie Osmond, Richard Thompson (as part of the Bunch), and the Jerry Garcia Band. In addition, Price had a cameo role on a version recorded by Barbara Mandrell, on her 1990 album Morning Sun. Karen Chandler and Jimmy Wakely directly covered the Price version in 1956. In 1996, BR5-49 covered “Crazy Arms” on their self-titled album issued on September 16, 1996. In 2000, Van Morrison and Linda Gail Lewis performed the song on their album You Win Again. Linda Ronstadt recorded a cover for her 1971 album, Linda Ronstadt. Marty Stuart recorded an instrumental version with Mooney on his 2010 album Ghost Train: The Studio B Sessions. Also recently recording "Crazy Arms" was Chris Isaak on his CD 2 of "Beyond the Sun" collection. Cajun band Kevin Naquin and the Ossun Playboys recorded the song for the 2018 album Man in the Mirror.
