= Young Blood (Jerry Lee Lewis album) =

Studio album by Jerry Lee Lewis
- Released: May 23, 1995
- Recorded: September 1993 − January 1995
- Studio: Blue Jay Recording Studio, Carlisle, Massachusetts; House of Blues Studios, Memphis, Tennessee; Lewis Ranch, Nesbit, Mississippi; Sunset Sound Factory, Los Angeles, California; Your Place or Mine Studio, Glendale, California
- Genre: Rock and roll, country
- Label: Sire
- Producer: Andy Paley

Jerry Lee Lewis chronology
Whole Lotta Shakin' Goin' On (1994)	Young Blood (1995)	Live at Gilley's (1999)

Young Blood is the thirty-eighth studio album by American musician Jerry Lee Lewis, released on Sire Records in 1995. Musicians included James Burton on lead guitar, Buddy Harman and Andy Paley on drums, and Al Anderson and Kenny Lovelace on guitar.

== Background ==
The album was released on Sire Records on May 23, 1995. It was recorded at Blue Jay Recording Studio, Carlisle, Massachusetts, House of Blues Studios, Memphis, Tennessee, Lewis Ranch, Nesbit, Mississippi, Sunset Sound Factory, Los Angeles, California, and Your Place Or Mine Studio, Glendale, California. It featured an all-star cast of musicians including James Burton, Buddy Harman, Joey Spampinato, Andy Paley and Kenny Lovelace.

The release was a comeback album which attempted to recapture the 1950s Sun Records style which Jerry Lee Lewis was most known for. There is heavy echo and a back-to-basics instrumentation with little or no reliance on synthesizers or studio effects.

The single that was released was "Goosebumps" backed by "Crown Victoria Custom '51". A music video was released that featured the song "Goosebumps". "Crown Victoria Custom '51" is played in the style of Jerry Lee Lewis' first and most iconic recording, "Whole Lotta Shakin' Goin' On" from 1957. The video also made an appearance on an episode of Beavis & Butthead, which help introduce "The Killer" to a whole new generation.

== Track listing ==
1. "I'll Never Get Out of This World Alive" (Fred Rose, Hank Williams) - 2:11
2. "Goosebumps" (Al Anderson, Andy Paley) - 2:33
3. "Things" (Bobby Darin) - 2:43
4. "Miss the Mississippi and You" (William Halley, Eric Schoenberg) - 3:37
5. "Young Blood" (Jerry Leiber, Mike Stoller) - 2:19
6. "Crown Victoria Custom '51" (Andy Paley, Jerry Lee Lewis, James Burton, Kenny Lovelace) - 3:02
7. "High Blood Pressure" (Huey Piano Smith) - 2:53
8. "Restless Heart" (Andy Paley, James Burton, Julie Richmond, Kenny Lovelace) - 2:46
9. "Gotta Travel On" (Dave Lazer, Fred Hellerman, Larry Ehrlich, Lee Hays, Paul Clayton, Pete Seeger, Ronnie Gilbert) - 2:05
10. "Down the Road a Piece" (Don Raye) - 2:28
11. "It Was the Whiskey Talkin' (Not Me)" (Andy Paley, Jonathan Paley, Michael Kernan, Ned Claflin) - 3:40
12. "Poison Love" (Elmer Laird) - 3:44
13. "One of them Old Things" (Hoy Lindsey, Joel Sonnier) - 2:49
14. "House of Blue Lights" (Don Raye, Freddie Slack) - 1:51

== Personnel ==
- Jerry Lee Lewis - vocals, piano
- James Burton - guitar
- Buddy Harman - drums
- Kenny Lovelace - guitar, fiddle
- Andy Paley - drums, backing vocals
- Joey Spampinato - bass
- Al Anderson - guitar
- Don Allen - drums
- Stuart Aptekar - horns and reeds
- Tom Ardonlino - drums
- Yoshihiro Arita - strings
- Don Baer - guitar
- Craig Ball - horns and reeds
- Jerry Byrd - bass
- Glen Colson - drums
- John Curtis - strings
- Elliot Easton - guitar
- Bob Efford - horns and reeds
- Matt Glaser - strings
- Bob Glaub - bass
- Michael Kernan - guitar, backing vocals
- Bobby B. Keyes - guitar
- Frank Macchia - horns and reeds
- Frank Marocco - accordion
- Jonathan Paley - bass
- Dave Roe Rorick - bass
- Mike Turk - harmonica
- Robby Turner - pedal steel guitar
- Stanley Watkins - horns and reeds
- Dan Weinstein - horns and reeds
- Billy West - backing vocals
- David Whitney - horns and reeds
- Mark Linett - recording and mix engineer

== Reception ==
The album was assessed favorably in The Encyclopedia of Music in the 20th Century: "Though performances in the 1980s exhibited a slightly reserved Jerry Lee Lewis, his 1995 album Young Blood showed a return to his old form."

In The Rough Guide to Rock 2003, Peter Buckley wrote: "1995's album, Young Blood, showed him potent as ever".

== Sources ==
- Bonomo, Joe (2009). Jerry Lee Lewis: Lost and Found. New York: Continuum Books.
- Bragg, Rick. (2014). Jerry Lee Lewis: His Own Story. New York: Harper.
- Tosches, Nick (1982). Hellfire. New York: Grove Press.
- Gutterman, Jimmy (1991). Rockin' My Life Away: Listening to Jerry Lee Lewis. Nashville: Rutledge Hill Press.
- Lewis, Myra; Silver, Murray (1981). Great Balls of Fire: The Uncensored Story of Jerry Lee Lewis. William Morrow/Quill/St. Martin's Press.
- Legends of American Music. Half a Century of Hits. Jerry Lee Lewis. Time-Life Music. 2006.
