= Ray Harris =

American rockabilly musician and songwriter (1927–2003)

Ray Harris (September 7, 1927 – November 13, 2003) was an American rockabilly musician and songwriter. He formed a band with Wayne Powers, and wrote the songs "Come On, Little Mama" and "Greenback Dollar, Watch and Chain". He eventually recorded these at Sun Records with Sam Phillips. He also produced artists at Hi Records. Like others such as Sonny Burgess, Hayden Thompson, Billy Lee Riley and Warren Smith, chart success largely eluded him.

Born in Tupelo, Mississippi, Harris died in November 2003 in Mooreville, Mississippi, at the age of 76.
