= Linda Gail Lewis =

American musician (born 1947)

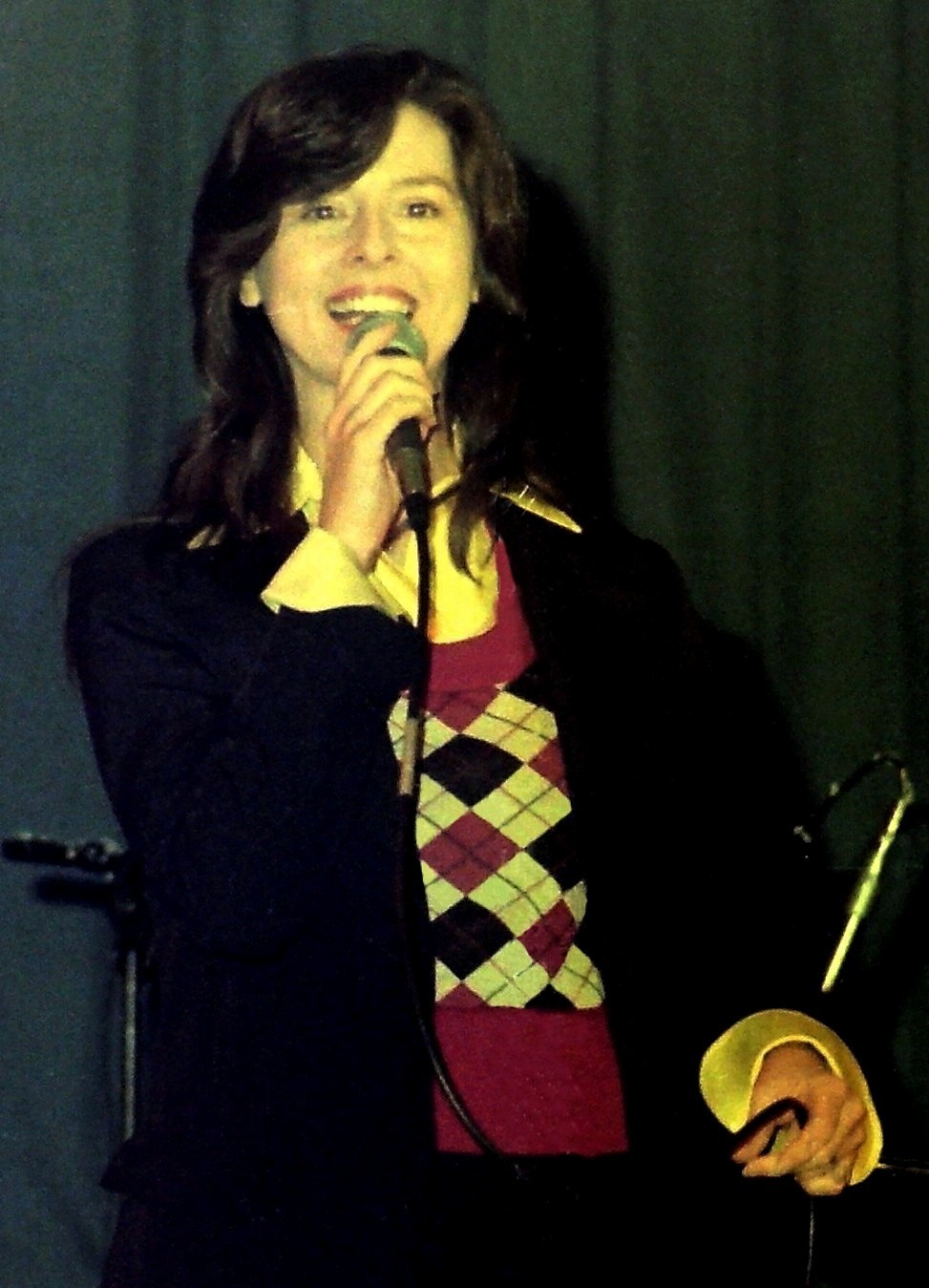
- Lewis's opening act prior to her brother's set from 1977

Background information
- Born: July 18, 1947 (age 79); Ferriday, Louisiana, U.S.
- Genres: Country; rock and roll; rockabilly
- Occupation: Musician
- Instruments: Vocals; piano
- Years active: 1963–present
- Labels: Smash; Sire; Fox; Virgin; Lantasi; Castle; Ball & Chain; Cleopatra
- Website: Official website

Linda Gail Lewis (born July 18, 1947) is an American singer, songwriter and pianist. She has recorded with her brother Jerry Lee Lewis, as well as Van Morrison, Robbie Fulks, Wanda Jackson, Melanie, Dale Watson, Mitch Ryder and Robert Gordon. She also has recorded with her two daughters, Mary Jean Ferguson and Annie Marie Lewis, in a group called the Lewis 3.

Since 2019 she has been signed with Cleopatra Records, and most of her albums have been produced by her son-in-law Danny B. Harvey, guitarist with The Rockats, Lemmy Kilmister and The Headcat along with drummer Slim Jim Phantom from Stray Cats and The Headcat. Clem Burke from Blondie is the drummer on her latest single.

She is married to former Stax promotions director Eddie Braddock.

== Discography ==
=== Albums ===
Year	Album	US Country	Label
1969	The Two Sides of Linda Gail Lewis	—	Smash
1969	Together (with Jerry Lee Lewis)	8	Smash
1990	International Affair	—	New Rose
1991	Do You Know	—	Lewis
1991	Rockin' With Linda – Recorded Live in London	—	Deep Elem
1992	I'll Take Memphis	—	Fox
1995	Love Makes the Difference	—	Icehouse
1999	Linda Gail Lewis	—	Sire/Lantasi
2000	You Win Again (with Van Morrison)	—	Virgin
2001	Rock 'n' Roll Special (with The Firebirds)	—	Rockville
2002	Out of the Shadows	—	Evine/Ten35/Lantasi
2002	Rock 'n' Roll	—	LGL
2004	Boogie Woogie Country Gal	—	Castle
2004	Lie and Deny	—	Lantasi
2005	Me and the Boys in the Band	—	Lantasi
2006	Rock, Roll & Remember	—	CB Artists
2006	Hungry Hill	—	Benlim
2007	Dazed and Confused	—	Collecting
2007	Jabalaya	—	Collecting
2007	You Were There	—	Ball and Chain
2007	The Queen of Rock 'n' Roll Live in France	—	Big Beat
2010	You & Me & Sweet Rock 'n' Roll – Best from Sweden	—	Ball and Chain
2015	Heartbreak Highway	—	Ball and Chain
2015	Gas Station Flowers	—	Raucous Records
2015	Hard Rockin' Woman	—	Lanark
2018	Wild! Wild! Wild! (with Robbie Fulks)	—	Bloodshot
2019	"Merry Christmas From Nashville (The Lewis 3)"	—	Cleopatra Records
2020	"Rockin' In England 1996"	—	LGL Records
2022	"Early Sides 1963-1973"	—	Cleopatra Records
2022	"Family Jewels Live" (with Annie Marie Lewis & Danny B. Harvey)		Cleopatra Records
2023	"A Tribute To Jerry Lee Lewis" (with Slim Jim Phantom & Danny B. Harvey)	—	Cleopatra Records

=== Singles ===
Year	Single	Chart Positions		Label
Year	Single	US Country	CAN Country	Label
1963	"Teenage Letter" (with Jerry Lee Lewis)	—	—	Sun
1963	"Nothin' Shakin' (But the Leaves on the Tree)"	—	—	Sun
1965	"Break Up the Party"	—	—	ABC
1965	"Green Green Grass of Home" (with Jerry Lee Lewis)	—	—	Smash
1967	"Jim Dandy" (as Linda Lewis)	—	—	Columbia
1968	"Good"	—	—	Smash
1969	"T-H-E E-N-D"	—	—	Smash
1969	"Don't Let Me Cross Over" (with Jerry Lee Lewis)	9	—	Smash
1969	"He's Loved Me Much Too Much"	—	—	Smash
1969	"Roll Over Beethoven" (with Jerry Lee Lewis)	71	12	Smash
1970	"My Heart Was the Last One to Know"	—	—	Smash
1970	"Before the Snow Flies"	—	—	Smash
1971	"Working Girl"	—	—	Mercury
1972	"Handwriting on the Wall" (with Jerry Lee Lewis)	—	—	Mercury
1972	"Smile Somebody Loves You"	39	—	Mercury
1972	"He's Loved Me Much Too Much"	—	—	Mercury
1974	"I Wanna Be a Sensuous Woman"	—	—	Mercury
1974	"The Joy and Love You Bring"	—	—	Mercury
1995	"Love Makes the Difference"	—	—	Bellmark
2000	"Let's Talk About Us" (with Van Morrison)	—	—	Virgin
2000	"Real Gone Lover" (with Van Morrison)	—	—	Virgin
2000	"No Way Pedro" (with Van Morrison)	—	—	Virgin
2000	"A Shot of Rhythm & Blues" (with Van Morrison)	—	—	Virgin
2002	"Baby, I'm in Love"	—	—	Lantasi
2004	"Lie and Deny"	—	—	Lantasi
2005	"Me and the Boys in the Band"	—	—	Lantasi
2023	"Down The Line (with Slim Jim Phantom & Danny B. Harvey)"	—	—	Cleopatra Records
2023	"Gilley's Last Ride EP (with Mickey Gilley)"	—	—	Cleopatra Records
2023	"Who's Bed Have Your Boots Been Under (with Wanda Jackson)"	—	—	Cleopatra Records
2023	"Diggin My Way Out of Hell (with Slim Jim Phantom)"	—	—	Cleopatra Records
2023	"I Want a Hippopotamus for Christmas (with Danny B. Harvey)"	—	—	Cleopatra Records
2023	"Seven Long Years"	—	—	Cleopatra Records
2024	"Baby Please Don't Go"	—	—	Cleopatra Records
2024	"Funnel Of Love"	—	—	Cleopatra Records
2024	"The Nickel Song (with Melanie)"	—	—	Cleopatra Records

=== Music videos ===
Year	Video
2002	"I'd Rather Stay Home And Rock 'n' Roll"

=== As "The Lewis 3" ===
- "Perfect World" (Ame Dane/Castle Music) (2006)
- "Merry Christmas From Nashville" (Benlin Music) (2006)
- "Merry Christmas From Nashville - Remastered)" (Cleopatra Records) (2019)

=== Import CDs ===
- Think Twice Before You Go (Swingin' Pig) (2001) (with Van Morrison)
- The Early Sides of Linda Gail Lewis (Smash Records) (2005)
- Early Rocking Country Days (Jukebox Records) (2005)

=== Videos and DVDs ===
- The Jerry Lee Lewis Show (various labels) guest appearance
- Jerry Lee Lewis – I Am What I Am (various labels) guest appearance
- Micke Muster – Live! (Silverrock Music) (2004) guest appearance
- Jerry Lee Lewis – Killer Piano (Alfred Publishing Co.) (2007) guest appearance
- The Queen of Rock 'n' Roll Live in France (Big Beat Records) (2007)
- The Many Sounds of Jerry Lee (ClassicCountryDVD) (2010) guest appearance
- The Family Jewels - Live Concert DVD from Crappon France on CLEOPATRA RECORDS
