= Mack Vickery =

American singer-songwriter

- The cover of Mack Vickery's album Live at the Alabama's Women Prison, 1970.

Background information
- Born: June 8, 1938; Town Creek, Alabama; United States
- Died: December 21, 2004 (aged 66); Nashville, Tennessee; United States
- Occupation(s): Songwriter, musician

Mack Vickery (June 8, 1938 – December 21, 2004), also known as Atlanta James and Vick Vickers, was an American musician, songwriter, and inductee in the Hillbilly Hall of Fame and Alabama Music Hall of Fame. His songs have been recorded by artists such as Jerry Lee Lewis, Waylon Jennings, George Thorogood, Johnny Cash, George Strait, Hank Williams Jr., and George Jones.

== Biography ==
Vickery was born in Town Creek, Alabama and moved to Memphis, Tennessee in 1957. Considered leading man material, he recorded for Sun Records, although nothing was initially released. Vickery continued to record for a number of minor labels and under various aliases, including "Vick Vickers" and "Atlanta James".

Vickery first scored a songwriting hit when Faron Young recorded Vickery's song "She Went A Little Bit Further", which reached number 14 on the Country Music charts in 1968. Vickery followed this with songs for artists like Johnny Cash, George Jones, Waylon Jennings, Johnny Paycheck, Lefty Frizzell, James Carr, John Anderson, and Tanya Tucker.

Vickery's most successful hit as a writer was co-writing "The Fireman" with Wayne Kemp, recorded by George Strait, which reached number 5 in 1985. Jerry Lee Lewis recorded a number of Vickery's songs, including "Rockin' My Life Away", "Meat Man" (described as "two minutes and forty seconds of sexual boasts, delivered furiously and convincingly") and "Ivory Tears". Vickery became known as Lewis's "speechwriter", and "In Vickery, a fan as well as a professional, Jerry Lee had found someone who could articulate his troubles better than he himself ever could." According to the book Jerry Lee Lewis - His Own Story, Vickery was one of Lewis' friends.

Waylon Jennings recorded "The Eagle" which was written by Vickery along with Hank Cochran and Red Lane. This song was used as the unofficial "official theme song" of the First Gulf War as it was easy to relate the lyrics to the F-15 Eagle fighter jet. Jennings had recorded "Cedartown Georgia" earlier in his career, a 1971 hit that was co–written by Vickery, Sammi Smith, and Charlie Cobble. Both songs are found on albums of the same names, respectively.

In 1970, Vickery recorded the album Live at the Alabama Women's Prison which included Elvis Presley impersonations. The back cover notes of the live album were penned by Waylon Jennings as he said Mack had beat him to the punch by recording a live album at a women's prison. He reached the charts as a singer (under the name "Atlanta James") for the first time in 1974 with "That Kind of Fool" (also recorded by Jerry Lee Lewis) and again in 1977 with "Ishabilly" and "Here's to the Horses".

Vickery was also friends with legendary Nashville disc jockey Ralph Emery and made numerous appearances on his early morning WSM television show. He also made several appearances on the Nashville Network (TNN) show Nashville Now.

In the 1970s, Vickery toured with comedian Hollis Champion, also known as "Elmer Fudpucker", opening shows for Jerry Lee Lewis.

In 1989, Vickery won the Music City News "Song Of The Year Award" for another song he co-wrote with Wayne Kemp, "I'll Leave This World Loving You", a hit for Ricky Van Shelton. In 2002, the Alabama Music Hall of Fame honored Vickery with a bronze star in its Walkway of Stars.

Vickery died of a heart attack in Nashville, Tennessee in 2004 at the age of 66.
