= Kenny Lovelace =

American guitarist & singer (born 1936)

- Born: Kenneth Lovelace; August 18, 1936 (age 89); Montgomery, Alabama
- Genres: Rock and roll
- Occupations: Singer-songwriter, musician, guitarist, bandleader
- Instruments: Vocals, guitar, fiddle
- Years active: 1955–present
- Website: jerryleelewis.org

Kenneth Lovelace (born August 18, 1936) is an American guitarist and singer best known for his former tenure with Jerry Lee Lewis.

== Life ==
Lovelace was born in Cloverdale, Alabama. He grew up in a small village 12 miles from Florence, where his family worked on a farm. Lovelace hooked up with a band called the Go-Go-Boys, who later changed their name to The Five Jets. He was with them for twelve years.

While playing in Monroe, Louisiana, he met rock and roll legend Jerry Lee Lewis, through Jerry's sister Linda Gail Lewis. Lewis wanted to hire the whole band, but the others had families to look after, so Jerry hired Kenny. He has been guitarist and band leader of The Memphis Beats for more than 40 years. Kenny lives in Nashville, Tennessee with his wife.

Lovelace has also recorded with artists such as Johnny Cash and Carl Perkins.
