= Guitar Gable =

American singer (1937–2017)

- Born: Gabriel Perrodin; August 17, 1937; Bellevue, Bossier Parish, Louisiana, United States
- Died: January 28, 2017 (aged 79) Opelousas, Louisiana, U.S.
- Genres: Swamp blues Louisiana blues Swamp pop
- Occupations: Singer, guitarist, songwriter
- Instruments: Vocals, guitar
- Labels: Excello, various

Gabriel Perrodin (August 17, 1937 – January 28, 2017), known as Guitar Gable, was an American Louisiana blues, swamp blues and swamp pop musician. He was best known for recording the original version of "This Should Go On Forever", and his part in the vibrant swamp blues and pop scene in Louisiana in the 1950s and early 1960s.

== Biography ==
Gable was born in Bellevue, St. Landry Parish , Louisiana, United States. His father was Creole. Guitar Gable was influenced by the music of Guitar Slim, and was self-taught in playing the guitar by his mid-teens. He formed a group called the Swing Masters, and was later introduced to King Karl (born Bernard Jolivette). "Guitar Gable had been playing jobs with some little guy out of Lafayette," Karl recalled to swamp pop historian Shane K. Bernard. "Anyhow, there was this priest, Father Millet, and one day he said, 'I was told you was fixing to be in a band. I got a good boy. I would like for you to get together with him 'cause I don't like the company he's with'." King Karl met Guitar Gable at a Swing Masters concert, and afterwards Gable left them to join King Karl, Gable's brother Clinton "Fats" Perrodin on bass guitar, and drummer Clarence "Jockey" Etienne, to form the Musical Kings.

Introduced to the record producer J. D. "Jay" Miller, the Musical Kings eventually became the heart of Miller's preferred studio musical ensemble. They backed musicians such as Lazy Lester, Classie Ballou, Skinny Dynamo, Bobby Charles and Slim Harpo. "I'm a King Bee" was written by Slim Harpo under his real name of James Moore. The song was recorded in March 1957 and was originally released that year as the B-side to his debut solo single, "I Got Love if You Want It". Its popularity led to Excello Records swapping the sides over. The other musicians on the recording were Gable (guitar); Fats Perrodin (bass); and Jockey Etienne (drums).

Guitar Gable and the Musical Kings had earlier recorded their own debut single for Excello in 1956. His first track was the pacy instrumental "Congo Mombo", which relied on the melody of "Frankie and Johnny". The A-side of the single was "Life Problem", which featured King Karl's vocals. The follow-up release included the swamp pop classic, "Irene", which later influenced Jimmy Clanton's "Just A Dream".

Subsequent releases followed a similar pattern with Gable's Caribbean-laced instrumentals such as "Congo Mombo," "Guitar Rhumbo" and "Gumbo Mombo," pitched against rock and roll tracks including "Cool, Calm, Collected" and "Walking in the Park." It was the blues influenced ballads including "Irene," "Life Problem" and "This Should Go On Forever" that caused most interest. The latter track was recorded by Gable and his band in 1958, but did not find favour with Miller. A cover version was recorded by Rod Bernard, and it reached the Top 20 of the US Billboard R&B chart. Gable's original was finally released in February 1959, but failed to match the success of Bernard's cover.

Gable and Karl left Miller and Excello in disgust, and were reduced to issuing work on the much smaller labels of La Louisianne and Tamm into the early 1960s. Gable served in the armed forces but later continued with his own band, maintaining a following in local clubs until 1968. In the 1970s, Gable performed regularly with Lil' Bob and the Lollipops, before he initially retired from performing in the 1980s.

In 1990 Gable appeared on Lil' Bob's CD Back Again for the Vidrine label. In the 1990s, Guitar Gable was tempted back to the performing stage by C.C. Adcock.

Gable's guitar work featured on Slim Harpo's 2011 compilation album, Rocks.

Gable died in hospital at Opelousas, Louisiana, on January 28, 2017, at the age of 79.

== Discography ==
=== Singles ===
Date	A-side	B-side	Label	Credit(s)
June 1956	"Life Problem" (Featuring King Karl)	"Congo Mombo"	Excello 2082	Guitar Gable and the Musical Kings
November 1956	"Guitar Rhumbo"	"Irene" (Vocal: King Karl)	Excello 2094	Guitar Gable and the Musical Kings
May 1957	"It's Hard, But It's Fair"	"Cool, Calm, Collected"	Excello 2108	Guitar Gable
October 1957	"Gumbo Mombo"	"What's The Matter With My Baby" (Vocal: King Karl)	Excello 2122	Guitar Gable
June 1958	"Walking in the Park" (Vocal: King Karl)	"Have Mercy on Me" (Vocal: King Karl)	Excello 2140	Guitar Gable
February 1959	"This Should Go On Forever"	"Please Operator"	Excello 2153	Guitar Gable

=== Albums ===
Year	Title	Label	Credit(s)
1984	Cool, Calm, Collected (The Legendary Jay Miller Series – Volume 36)	Flyright FLY-599	Guitar Gable with King Karl

=== Selected compilation albums ===
Date	Title	Label	Song by Gable
June 1960	Tunes To Be Remembered	Excello LPS-8001	"Congo Mombo"
1972	The Excello Story	Excello LPS-8025	"This Should Go On Forever"
1999	The Excello Story, Volume 2: 1955–1957	Hip-O/MCA HIPD-40150	"Congo Mombo", "Irene"
1999	The Excello Story, Volume 3: 1957–1961	Hip-O/MCA HIPD-40156	"This Should Go On Forever"
2015	The Excello Blues Story	Day One (UK) Records [5060255182833]	"Congo Mombo", "Life Problem"

== See also ==
- List of Swamp blues musicians
- List of Louisiana blues musicians
- Louisiana Creole people
