= Larry Garner =

American songwriter (born 1952)

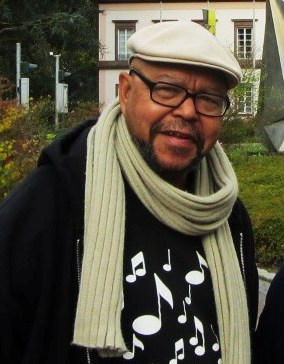
- Garner in 2013

Background information
- Born: Larry Garner; July 8, 1952 (age 74); New Orleans, Louisiana, United States
- Genres: Louisiana blues, swamp blues
- Occupations: Musician, singer, songwriter
- Instruments: Guitar, vocals
- Years active: Early 1980s–present
- Labels: Several including JSP and Ruf

Larry Garner (born July 8, 1952 in New Orleans, Louisiana, United States) is a Louisiana blues musician best known for his 1994 album Too Blues.

== Biography ==
Garner grew up in Baton Rouge, Louisiana. His first inspiration was the guitar-playing preacher Reverend Utah Smith. Garner made acquaintance with local musicians such as Lonesome Sundown, Silas Hogan, Guitar Kelley and Tabby Thomas. His musical influences include Hogan, Clarence Edwards, Jimi Hendrix, and Henry Gray. He was taught to play guitar by his uncle and two other elders. Garner completed military service in Korea and returned to Baton Rouge, working part-time in music and full-time at a Dow Chemical plant.

Garner won the International Blues Challenge in 1988. His first two albums, Double Dues and Too Blues, were released by the British JSP label. The latter album's title was in reply to a label executive who judged Garner's original demo to be "too blues". Thomas's nightclub, Tabby's Blues Box, provided Garner with a playing base in the 1980s and gave him the subject matter for the song "No Free Rides" on Double Dues.

He recorded the albums You Need to Live a Little (1994), Baton Rouge (1995), Standing Room Only (1998), and Once Upon the Blues (2000). The song "Go to Baton Rouge", from the album Baton Rouge, offered a tourist's guide to Louisiana music spots.

In 2008, Garner was treated for a serious illness that was the inspiration for his 2008 album, Here Today Gone Tomorrow.

== Discography ==
All thirteen of Garner's CDs have been released by labels in Britian, France, or Germany:

- Double Dues (1993), JSP
- Too Blues (1994), JSP
- You Need to Live a Little (1994), Gitanes Jazz/Verve
- Baton Rouge (1995 [1999]), Gitanes Jazz/Verve; Evidence
- Standing Room Only (1998), Ruf
- Once Upon the Blues (2000), Ruf
- Embarrassment to the Blues (Live in Europe) (2002), Ruf
- Here Today Gone Tomorrow (2008), Dixiefrog
- Larry Garner with Norman Beaker & Friends: Live at the Tivoli (recorded at the Tivoli Theatre, Wimborne Minster, 8 October 2009) (2010), NLB CD001
- Blues for Sale (2012), Dixiefrog
- Larry Garner & the Norman Beaker Band: Good Night in Vienna (2013), 405047
- Up Close and Personal with Michael Van Merwyk (2014), Dixiefrog
- Guilty Saints with Neal Black (2016), Dixiefrog

== See also ==
- Louisiana blues
