= Jimmy Dotson =

American singer

- Also known as: Jimmy "Louisiana" Dotson
- Born: James Dent Dotson; October 19, 1933; Ethel, Louisiana, U.S
- Died: March 26, 2017 (aged 83) Houston, Texas, U.S
- Genres: Blues
- Occupations: Singer, guitarist, drummer, songwriter
- Instruments: Vocals, guitar, drums
- Years active: 1950s–2000s
- Labels: Zynn, Rocko, Home of the Blues

James Dent Dotson (October 19, 1933 – March 26, 2017), sometimes known as Jimmy "Louisiana" Dotson, was an American blues singer, guitarist and drummer. His best known track was "I Need Your Love", a song he co-wrote with Jerry West. Over a sixty-year career, Dotson played alongside Silas Hogan, Lightnin' Slim, Slim Harpo, Lazy Lester, Albert King, O. V. Wright, Rufus Thomas, Ivory Joe Hunter, Buddy Guy, Son Seals, and Isaac Hayes. He released three singles on different record labels between 1959 and 1963.

== Life and career ==
Dotson was born in Ethel, Louisiana, on October 19, 1933. He began his music career singing in local juke joints. As a teenager he relocated to New York, where he performed in comedy shows singing pop music standards, but his fledgling solo singing career failed to take off. By the mid-1950s he had returned to Louisiana, briefly playing in an ensemble with Lazy Lester. Silas Hogan had relocated to Baton Rouge, Louisiana, by the early 1950s and, equipped with a Fender electric guitar, formed the Rhythm Ramblers. Hogan sang and played rhythm guitar with Dotson (drums), Isaiah Chapman (lead guitar), and Sylvester Buckley (harmonica). They stayed together for almost ten years and contributed to the development of the Baton Rouge blues sound. Though Hogan was the group's leader, their first recordings had Dotson on lead vocals, and the tracks were released in his name. Two singles, "I Wanna Know" backed with "Looking for My Baby" and "Oh Baby" backed with "I Need Your Love" were issued in 1959 and 1960, by Zynn and Rocko Records, respectively, which were both owned by J. D. "Jay" Miller. AllMusic noted that they were "both in an upbeat R&B vein, quite different from Hogan's down-home blues sound."

In the 1950s, Dotson also played drums behind Slim Harpo, Ivory Joe Hunter and Lightnin' Slim. Dotson moved on to Memphis, Tennessee, for several years and released another single, "Search No More" backed with "Feel Alright", which was issued by the small Memphis record company Home of the Blues. His life there was tough, as he spent some time homeless, and a proposed solo recording session for Sun Records came to nothing. He moved to Osceola, Arkansas, where he found work drumming for Albert King. During his time there, Dotson befriended Son Seals, who taught him to play the guitar. Dotson later mastered both the bass and the piano, which proved useful additions, as he then worked as a session musician. His work included sessions with O. V. Wright, Rufus Thomas, Buddy Guy, and Isaac Hayes. However, with the lack of a regular income from music, Dotson became a traveling salesman, a job he held for over 30 years.

He moved back to Baton Rouge in the early 1980s and maintained a part-time music career, performing at Tabby Thomas’ Blues Box club. By the 1990s, Dotson was living in Houston, Texas, where he started his own band, Antique Funk. They became regular performers in Houston's blues scene, before ill health started to curb his output in the early 2000s. In August 1994, at its annual gala, the Baton Rouge Blues Foundation honored Dotson and Lightnin' Slim. Dotson suffered a heart attack in 1997, and a resulting stroke and complications from diabetes took their toll. In 2014, the Houston Blues Society held a benefit event to help offset his medical bills.

Dotson died on March 26, 2017, at the age of 83.

He is not to be confused with the similarly named American soul singer (born James A. Dotson in Baltimore, Maryland, and died in 1991) who recorded for a string of labels, including Mercury, in the 1960s and early 1970s, although some sources have confused the two.

== Singles discography ==
Year	Title	Record label
1959	"I Wanna Know" / "Looking For My Baby"	Zynn Records
1960	"Oh Baby" / "I Need Your Love"	Rocko Records
1963	"Search No More" / "Feel Alright"	Home of the Blues Records
