= Moses "Whispering" Smith =

American songwriter

- Born: Moses Smith; January 25, 1932; Union Church, Mississippi, United States
- Died: April 28, 1984 (aged 52) Baton Rouge, Louisiana, United States
- Genres: Swamp blues Louisiana blues
- Occupations: Harmonicist, singer, songwriter
- Instruments: Harmonica, vocals
- Label: Excello

Moses "Whispering" Smith (January 25, 1932 – April 28, 1984) was an American blues harmonicist and singer. He recorded tracks including "A Thousand Miles from Nowhere" and "Texas Flood" and worked with Lightnin' Slim and with Silas Hogan. He was inducted into the Louisiana Blues Hall of Fame.

== Biography ==
Smith was born in Union Church, Mississippi.

In the 1960s, Smith played harmonica on recordings by the swamp blues notables Lightnin' Slim and Silas Hogan, before he was able to record some tracks of his own. At this time he worked with the record producer J. D. "Jay" Miller, based in Crowley, Louisiana, and his recordings were released by Excello Records. His singles included the songs "Mean Woman Blues", and "Don't Leave Me Baby" and the B-side instrumental tracks "Live Jive" and "Hound Dog Twist".

Although he was a powerful singer and a straight but unsophisticated harmonica player, his success was diminished by his emergence when swamp blues was declining in popularity. He recorded his final solo album for Excello, Over Easy, in 1971. Two years later, he toured Europe as part of American Blues Legends '73, contributing two tracks to the Big Bear Records album of the same name.

Smith died in April 1984 in Baton Rouge, Louisiana, at the age of 52.

== Discography ==
=== Singles ===
Year	Title	Label
1963	"Mean Woman Blues"	Excello Records
1963	"Don't Leave Me Baby"	Excello Records
1964	"Cryin' Blues"	Excello Records
1964	"Baby You're Mine"	Excello Records
1971	"Why Am I Treated So Bad"	Excello Records
1984	"Just Like a Woman"	Sunland Records

=== Albums ===
Year	Title	Label
1971	Over Easy	Blue Horizon

=== Compilation albums ===
Year	Title	Label	Song by Smith
1970	Louisiana Blues	Arhoolie Records	"On the Dark Road Crying"
1973	American Blues Legends '73	Big Bear Records	"Take Me Back Baby" and "Texas Flood"
1989	Louisiana Swamp Blues	Flyright Records	"Baby Left Me This Morning"

== See also ==
- List of Louisiana blues musicians
- List of swamp blues musicians
