= Warren Storm =

American drummer and singer (1937–2021)

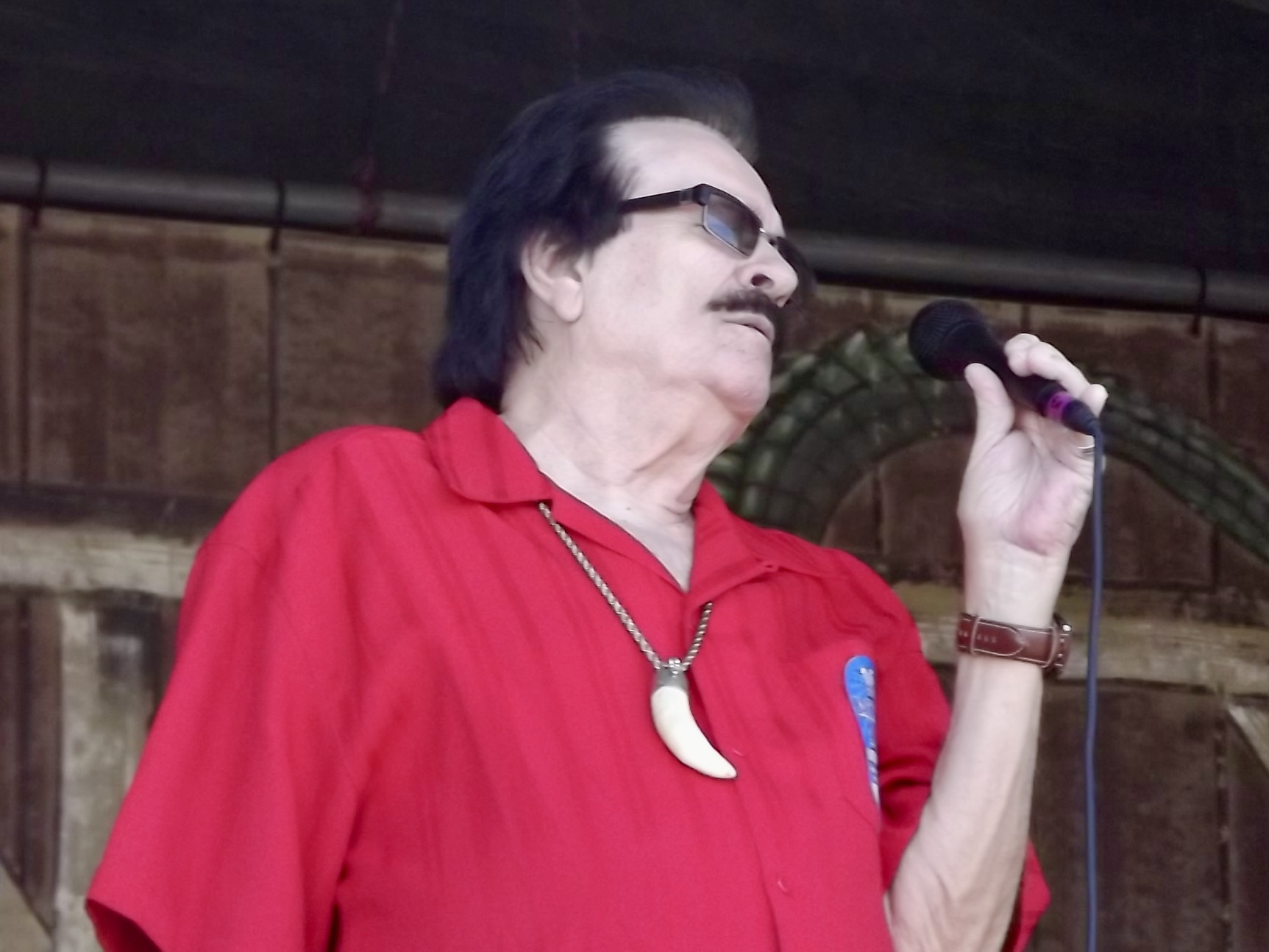
- Warren Storm (2016)

Background information
- Born: Warren Schexnider; February 18, 1937
- Origin: Abbeville, Louisiana, U.S.
- Died: September 7, 2021 (aged 84)
- Genres: Swamp pop, country
- Instruments: Drums, vocals
- Years active: 1956–2021
- Labels: Nasco, Jin, Rocko, Zynn, Top Rank, Dot, Sincere, Teardrop, La Louisianne, Premier, Showtime, Starflite, etc.

Warren Storm (né Schexnider; February 18, 1937 – September 7, 2021) was an American drummer and vocalist, known as a pioneer of the musical genre swamp pop; a combination of rhythm and blues, country and western, and Cajun music and black Creole music.

== Background and career ==
Born Warren Schexnider on February 18, 1937, in Leroy, Louisiana, he moved to nearby Abbeville, Louisiana, to attend first grade. Storm learned to play drums and guitar from his father, a Cajun musician. In the early 1950s, he began to perform publicly with Larry Brasso and the Rhythmaires.

Around this time he befriended fellow Abbeville musician Bobby Charles, and the two would travel to New Orleans to hear black rhythm and blues artists in the local nightclubs, particularly Fats Domino and drummers Earl Palmer and Charles "Hungry" Williams. These visits to New Orleans greatly influenced Storm's musical tastes and his own drumming style. Storm cites New Orleans rhythm and blues musician Charles "Hungry" Williams as a major drumming influence.

In 1956, Storm founded his own rhythm and blues/early rock and roll group, and in 1958 he began recording for Crowley, Louisiana, record producer J. D. "Jay" Miller. Miller convinced Nasco records of Nashville to release a 45 RPM record of Storm's version of the old country composition "Prisoner's Song"; the flip side was "Mama Mama Mama (Look What Your Little Boy's Done)." The release broke into the Billboard Hot 100 and both songs became lifelong standards for Storm. Storm also served as a session drummer for Miller in the late 1950s and 1960s and appeared on dozens of swamp blues sessions for Excello by artists such as Lazy Lester, Lightnin' Slim, Katie Webster, and Lonesome Sundown.

Over the following years Storm recorded swamp pop music for numerous labels, including Rocko, Zynn, American Pla-Boy, Top Rank, and Dot. In the early 1960s he teamed up with fellow swamp pop musicians Rod Bernard and Skip Stewart to form The Shondells, performing with the group and cutting tracks on the La Louisianne label until The Shondells disbanded around 1970.

Meanwhile, Storm released songs on several more labels, including ATCO, Sincere, and Teardrop, and, later, Premier, Showtime, Starflite, and Jin, among others. It was during this period that Storm recorded two more regional favorites, "Lord I Need Somebody Bad Tonight" and "My House of Memories".

During the 1980s and '90s, Storm appeared as a regular house musician at several south Louisiana danceclubs, and in 1989 recorded the Cajun Born LP for La Louisianne with fellow south Louisiana musicians Rufus Thibodeaux, Johnnie Allan, and Clint West.

== Resurgence of popularity ==
Around 2000, Storm experienced a resurgence in popularity when he joined the Lil' Band of Gold, an all-star south Louisiana band that included, among others, guitarist C. C. Adcock, accordionist Steve Riley of the Mamou Playboys; fiddler David Greely; Richard Comeaux of River Road; and pianist David Egan of Filé.

On September 5, 2010, during his performance at the "Boogie for the Bayou" fundraiser event at Paragon Casino in Marksville, Louisiana, Storm was inducted into The Louisiana Music Hall of Fame.

Storm died on September 7, 2021, at the age of 84.
