= Shake Your Hips =

1966 song by Slim Harpo

Single by Slim Harpo
- B-side: "Midnight Blues"
- Released: June 1966
- Recorded: February 1966
- Studio: J. D. Miller, Crowley, Louisiana
- Genre: Blues
- Length: 2:23
- Label: Excello
- Songwriter: James Moore a.k.a. Slim Harpo
- Producer: J. D. Miller

Slim Harpo singles chronology
"Baby Scratch My Back" (1965)	"Shake Your Hips" (1966)	"I'm Your Bread Maker, Baby" (1966)

"Shake Your Hips" (sometimes known as "Hip Shake") is a song written by Louisiana bluesman Slim Harpo. He recorded it in February 1966 for producer J. D. Miller for a follow-up single to his hugely successful "Baby Scratch My Back". Miller's Excello Records released it as a single in June 1966 and in October, the song became the lead track for Slim Harpo's 1966 album Baby Scratch My Back, which was a long-term release in Excello's catalogue.

Slim Harpo biographer Martin Hawkins describes it as a "dance-instruction song [with a] fast-paced, hypnotic shoeshine beat". He notes contributions by Lazy Lester on percussion and Katie Webster on organ.

== Reception and influence ==
A June 18, 1966, "Spotlight Singles" review in Billboard magazine included "Harpo follows up his hit 'Baby Scratch My Back' with two blues-based sides. Dance-teaching tune is backed by a solid blues weeper with harmonica backing". The review predicted that the single would reached the top 60 of the magazine's Hot 100 singles chart, however, it stalled at number 116 on the Bubbling Under Hot 100 Singles chart for July 23, 1966. Hawkins notes "It seems that 'Shake Your Hips' was a more influential disc than its chart position indicated, and it sold widely over a long period".

== The Rolling Stones version ==
"Shake Your Hips"

Song by the Rolling Stones

from the album Exile on Main St.
- Released: May 12, 1972
- Genre: Blues rock
- Length: 2:59
- Label: Rolling Stones Records
- Songwriter: Slim Harpo
- Producer: Jimmy Miller

The Rolling Stones recorded the song for their album Exile on Main St.. It was Mick Jagger's idea to record it for the album. The Stones recorded this in London, but reworked it at Keith Richards' villa in the South of France, where the band was staying on their "exile." It was recorded to sound like a '50s record.

== Other renditions ==
The song has been recorded by many artists, including Love Sculpture for their 1968 album Blues Helping. Other renditions include those by The Dream Syndicate on Out of the Grey (1997 release), the Legendary Shack Shakers on Cockadoodledon't (2003) and Joan Osborne on Bring It On Home (2012).
