= Julian Piper =

British musician (1947–2019)

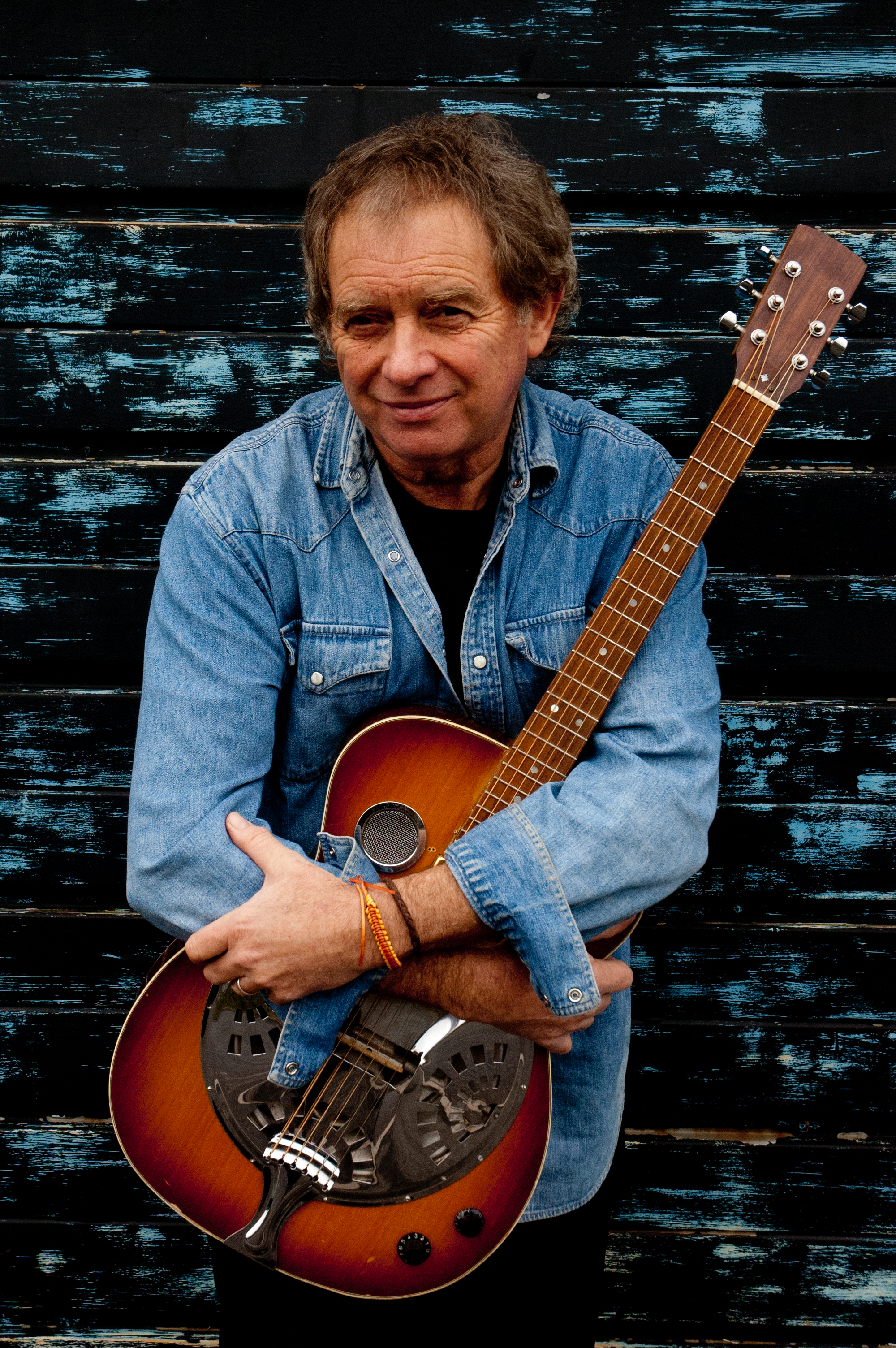

Background information
- Born: Julian Charles Piper; 10 August 1947; Topsham, Devon, England
- Died: 14 September 2019 (aged 72) Exeter, Devon, England
- Genres: Blues, R&B
- Instruments: Guitar, vocals

Julian Charles Piper (10 August 1947 – 14 September 2019) was a British blues guitarist, singer, writer, promoter and record producer, described in The Guardian as "one of the UK’s foremost champions of African-American blues".

== Life and career ==
Piper was born in Topsham, Devon, England, and as a boy decided he wanted to become a performer after seeing a show by Adam Faith in nearby Exeter. He later wrote:

"...when many of my friends were mainlining on the Beatles, my teenage years were spent thrilling to the sounds of Lightnin' Hopkins and Muddy Waters, wrestling with first a cigar box and later a guitar with a neck like a banana, trying to copy the raw Blues emanating from the scratched vinyl on my distorted Dansette record player. And one day I hoped I'd own a red Fender Stratocaster like Hank Marvin, stand on a stage, play it LOUD, and that one day I'd look out and see the girl of my dreams. I'm pleased to say that over the years it's all happened....give or take a few errors along the way."

He taught himself guitar, and in his late teens formed his own prog rock band, Flood, who supported Hawkwind on several occasions' as well as Arthur Brown and Genesis. Flood's recordings from 1973 were released as A New Way of Living in 2026.

In 1975, he formed his own R&B band, Junkyard Angels, initially with Steve Ewart (bass), Dave Eustace (drums) and Craig Milverton (keyboards). The band performed nationally as well as locally, and supported visiting American blues musicians. They also played on Paul Jones' BBC radio blues shows. Piper took a course in American Arts at Exeter University, and in 1987 spent his final year in Baton Rouge, Louisiana, where he quickly established himself as a guitarist in local blues clubs. He played there and elsewhere in the US with Carey and Lurrie Bell, Tabby Thomas, Silas Hogan, Chris Thomas King and Lazy Lester, among others, and in 2009 performed at the New Orleans Jazz Festival. In England, Junkyard Angels supported such visiting musicians as Louisiana Red, Eddie C. Campbell, Carey and Lurrie Bell, Lazy Lester, and Eddie Kirkland, and the band performed at numerous blues festivals in the UK and Europe. The band released three albums, Dirty Work at the Crossroads, Lonesome La La, and Tangled and Twisted, including some of Piper's own composition as well as blues standards.

Piper became a full-time musician, promoter and writer in England. He wrote articles on the blues for various publications including Mojo, The Guardian, and specialist guitar magazines, interviewing the likes of Buddy Guy and Peter Green, amongst many others. Between 1991 and 1998 he ran courses on blues history at Exeter University. He presented a four-part documentary, Blues on the Bayou, on BBC Radio 3 in 1991, including his field recordings, and published a book documenting his time in Baton Rouge, Blues from the Bayou, in 2016. He was also reviews editor for Acoustic magazine. He established Blues South West, to promote the music in the region, and set up local gigs by Robert Cray among others. He was involved in the release of eleven albums, mostly by his Exeter-based band Junkyard Angels, but also with Carey and Lurrie Bell, Lazy Lester, Tabby Thomas and Silas Hogan. He was the only British guitarist to have played on two albums which won the W. C. Handy Award. He produced the 2003 album Memphis....in the Meantime by 1960s star Dave Berry, and also released a solo album, Terlingua, in 2011. As well as leading Junkyard Angels, he played cajun music with Papa Gator and the Levee Breakers, and in a blues and jazz trio, Jelly Roll.

Piper died in 2019, aged 72, as a result of a cycling accident near Exeter. He had been married twice, and had two sons (one of whom predeceased him), and a daughter. Both of his surviving children are musicians.

== Discography ==
=== Junkyard Angels ===
- Dirty Work at the Crossroads (BSW, 1988)
- Lonesome La La (BSW, 1994)
- Tangled and Twisted (BSW)
- Backtracks (compilation, BSW, 2018)

=== Jelly Roll ===
- Can I Play with your Poodle (BSW)

=== Solo ===
- Terlingua (BSW, 2016)

=== As band member and/or producer ===
- Carey and Lurrie Bell, Straight Shoot (BSW, 1987)
- Lazy Lester, Lester Rides Again (Stomp, 1987)
- Tabby Thomas, King of the Swamp Blues (BSW, 1988)
- Silas Hogan, The Godfather (BSW, 1989)
- Dave Berry, Memphis in the Meantime (Blues Matters, 2003)
