= Lil' Buck Sinegal =

American guitarist and singer (1944–2019)

Paul "Lil' Buck" Sinegal
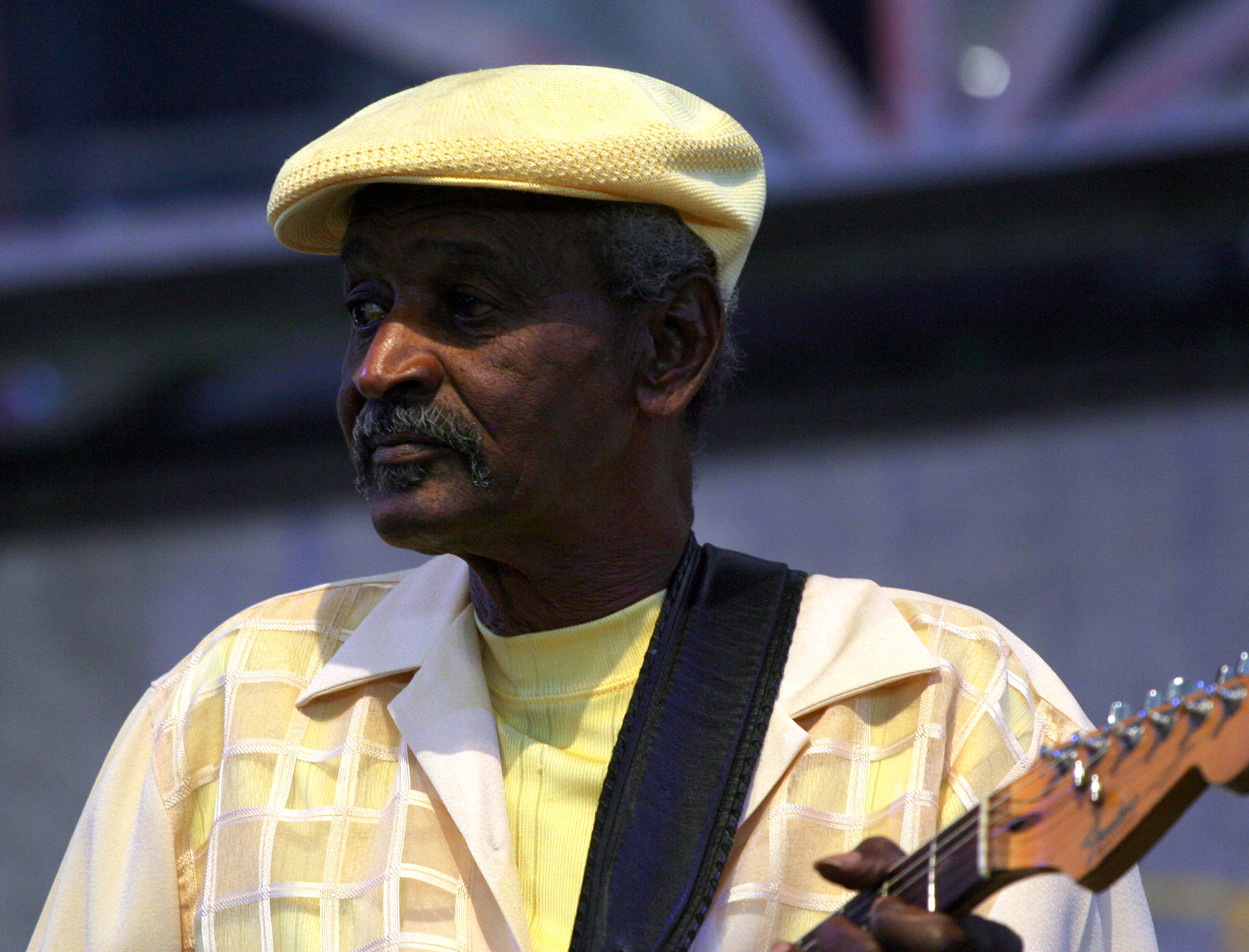
- Sinegal at Jazz Fest in 2015

Background information
- Born: Paul Alton Senegal; January 14, 1944; Lafayette, Louisiana, U.S.
- Died: June 10, 2019 (aged 75) Lafayette, Louisiana, U.S.
- Genres: Blues, zydeco
- Occupations: Guitarist, singer, songwriter
- Instruments: Guitar, vocals
- Years active: Late 1950s–2019
- Labels: La Louisianne; NYNO; Lucky Cat

Paul Alton "Lil' Buck" Sinegal (January 14, 1944 – June 10, 2019) was an American blues and zydeco guitarist and singer.

== Biography ==
=== Early years ===
Paul Alton Senegal was born in Lafayette, Louisiana. According to researchers Bob Eagle and Eric LeBlanc, the spelling "Sinegal" rather than "Senegal" was the result of a passport error, which he never corrected. Sinegal was nicknamed "Little Buck" (for buckwheat) or "Lil' Buck" because of his short stature. Fellow musicians just called him "Buckaroo. Sinegal's mother, Odette Broussard, played guitar. In the late 1950s, Sinegal began performing with other musicians, such as Carol Fran, James "Thunderbird" Davis, Lee Dorsey, and Joe Tex.

=== Career ===
Sinegal entered the music industry as a session musician at Excello Records, working with musicians such as Slim Harpo, Lazy Lester. Sinegal recorded with Rockin' Dopsie, Allen Toussaint Fernest Arceneaux, Katie Webster and Lil' Bob. In the late 1960s Sinegal recorded his own instrumentals, including "Cat Scream" and "Monkey in a Sack", for the La Louisianne record label.

Sinegal joined Clifton Chenier's band in 1969 and toured regularly with him in Europe and elsewhere over the next decade. Later, in the 1980s and 1990s, Sinegal also toured internationally with Buckwheat Zydeco and Rockin' Dopsie.

Sinegal founded the Cowboy Stew Blues Revue with C. C. Adcock. In 1999, Sinegal released the album The Buck Starts Here, featuring songs predominantly written and produced by Allen Toussaint. Critic Richie Unterberger described the record as "a fairly straight blues album with faint or nonexistent traces of zydeco", Sinegal commented: "I am probably more known as a zydeco guitarist... [but] I've always been a bluesman...Zydeco is the blues. It's basically blues played with accordion. Clifton Chenier's music was blues throughout."

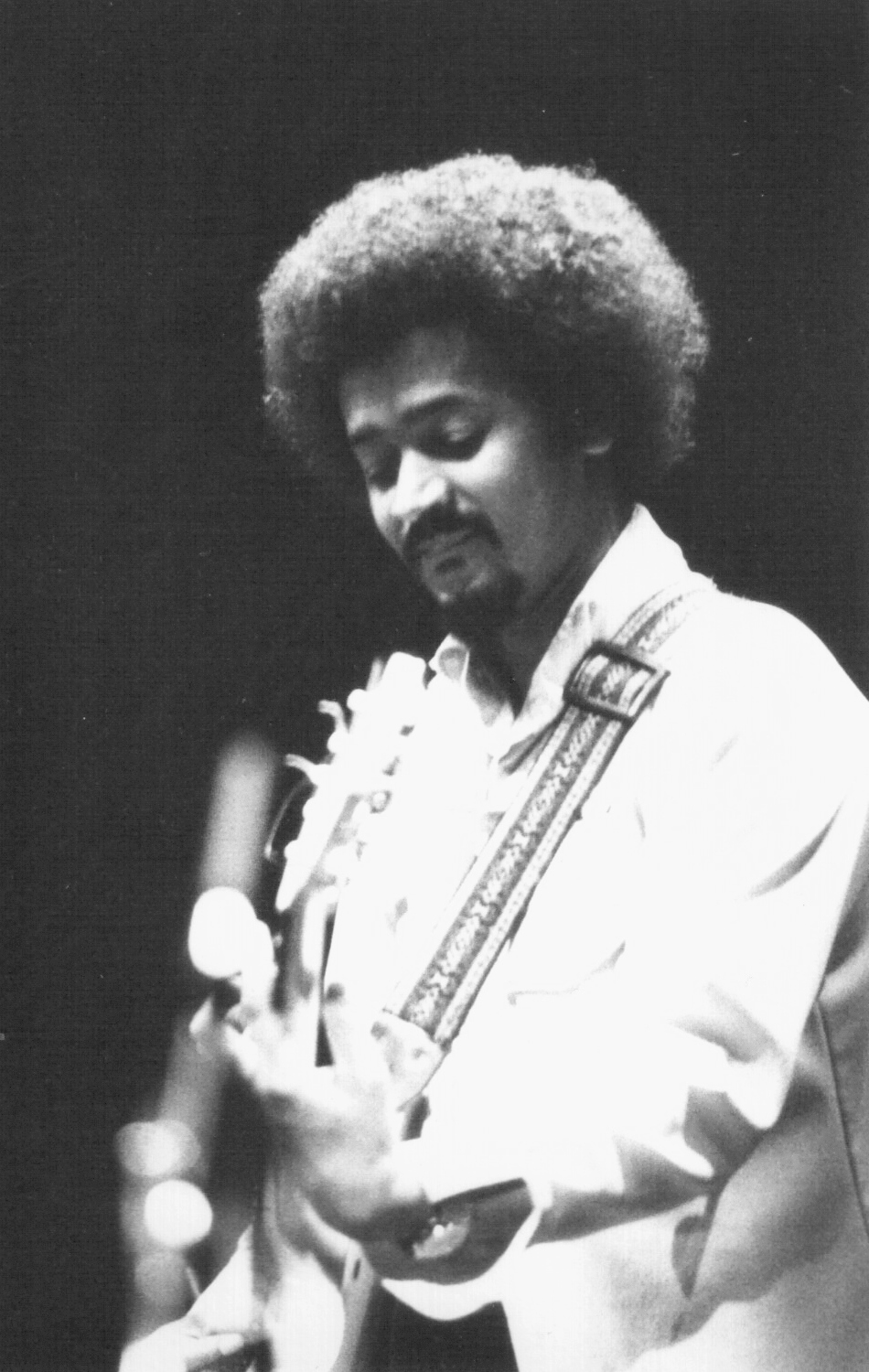
Paul Sinegal in 1977

== Documentaries ==
Sinegal appeared in the 2015 documentary film I Am the Blues.

== Death ==
Sinegal died at 75 in 2019 and his funeral was at the Immaculate Heart of Mary Church in Lafayette.

== Awards ==
Sinegal was inducted into the Louisiana Blues Hall of Fame in 1999.He was inducted into the Louisiana Music Hall of Fame on his birthday, on January 14, 2013, at the Blue Moon Cafe, Lafayette.
