= Harp & Soul =

Studio album by Lazy Lester
- Released: 1988
- Recorded: 1988
- Studio: King Snake
- Genre: Blues, swamp blues
- Label: Alligator
- Producer: Bob Greenlee

Lazy Lester chronology
| Lazy Lester Rides Again (1987) | Harp & Soul (1988) | Lazy Lester (1989) |

Harp & Soul is an album by the American musician Lazy Lester, released in 1988. He supported it with a North American tour.

== Production ==
Recorded in the summer of 1988 at King Snake Studios, in Sanford, Florida, the album was produced by Bob Greenlee. Lucky Peterson contributed on keyboards. "I'm a Man" is a cover of the Bo Diddley song. "Raining in My Heart" was written by Slim Harpo. "Bloodstains on the Wall" is a narrative about a girlfriend who delights in killing men. "Alligator Shuffle" is an instrumental.

== Critical reception ==
Professional ratings
Review scores
| Source | Rating |
|---|---|
| All Music Guide to the Blues | 4/5 stars |
| The Encyclopedia of Popular Music | 3/5 stars |
| The Grove Press Guide to the Blues on CD | 3.5/5 stars |
| MusicHound Blues: The Essential Album Guide | 5/5 stars |
| The Penguin Guide to Blues Recordings | 2.5/4 stars |
| The Rolling Stone Jazz & Blues Album Guide | 4/5 stars |
| SouthtownStar | 3/5 stars |

The Washington Post noted that "not only is his gravelly voice and soulful harmonica put to excellent use here ... but the unfussy sound mix and the contrasting but always tasteful guitar work of Kenny Neal and Pete Carr suit Lester just fine." The Philadelphia Inquirer opined that "while the harp playing is excellent—few can imply more fire or longing with simple manipulations of breath—Lester's singing, full of flying leaps and self-conscious turns, borders on lounge-lizard camp."

The SouthtownStar called Lester "a specialist in swamp boogie and keening harp crying." The News & Observer said that his vocals "are rich and gravelly, slow as molasses and sinfully delicious". The Boston Globe praised Lester's "unique tone and sense of irony". The Blade concluded that "there is a sprightliness to this LP that is lacking in many electric blues albums".

== Track listing ==
| No. | Title | Length |
|---|---|---|
| 1. | "I Done Gone Over It" |
| 2. | "Take Me in Your Arms" |
| 3. | "I'm a Man" |
| 4. | "Patrol Wagon Blues" |
| 5. | "Dark End of the Street" |
| 6. | "Raining in My Heart" |
| 7. | "Bye Bye Baby" |
| 8. | "Bloodstains on the Wall" |
| 9. | "Alligator Shuffle" |
| 10. | "Five Long Years" |
