= Baby Scratch My Back =

1965 song by Slim Harpo

Single by Slim Harpo
- B-side: "I'm Gonna Miss You (Like the Devil)"
- Released: 1965
- Recorded: 1965
- Studio: J. D. Miller, Crowley, Louisiana
- Genre: Country blues
- Length: 2:47
- Label: Excello
- Songwriter(s): James Moore a.k.a. Slim Harpo
- Producer(s): J. D. Miller

"Baby Scratch My Back" is a 1965 rhythm and blues song by blues singer Slim Harpo. It is mostly an instrumental piece with occasional monologue and harmonica fills by Harpo. Although it had some success with rock audiences (reaching number 16 on Billboard's Hot 100 chart), "Baby Scratch My Back" was a number one hit in 1966 on the magazine's Hot Rhythm & Blues Singles chart. It was Harpo's most commercially successful single and was subsequently recorded by several musicians.

== Background ==
The backing has been described as "a laconic, loping beat with tremolo laden guitar, wood block maracas, and snapping snare drum sound". The "chicken scratch" guitar was played by James Johnson.

Harpo referred to it as "an attempt at rock and roll for me". Several rock groups had recorded some of his songs, including the Rolling Stones ("I'm a King Bee") and the Kinks ("Got Love If You Want It"). Music writer Todd Everett noted "Harpo evidently figured that he had a future in rock and roll".

== Influences ==
- In 1966, juke joint blues musician Frank Frost recorded an adaptation of "Baby Scratch My Back" titled "My Back Scratcher". The session was produced by former Elvis Presley guitarist Scotty Moore for the Louisiana record label Jewel. Released as a single, it reached number 43 on the R&B chart, marking Frost's only appearance in the record charts.
