= Rainin' in My Heart (song) =

Single by Slim Harpo

from the album Slim Harpo Sings "Raining in My Heart..."
- A-side: "Don't Start Cryin' Now"
- Released: January 1961
- Recorded: November, 1960; Crowley, Louisiana, U.S.
- Genre: Swamp blues
- Length: 2:11
- Label: Excello 2194
- Songwriters: James Moore; Jerry West
- Producer: J. D. "Jay" Miller

Slim Harpo singles chronology
"Blues Hang-Over" (1960)	"Rainin' in My Heart" (1961)	"I Love the Life I'm Living" (1963)

"Rainin' in My Heart" is a song written by James Moore (aka Slim Harpo) and Jerry West (an alias used by J. D. "Jay" Miller) and performed by Harpo. It reached number 17 on the U.S. R&B chart and number 34 on the U.S. pop chart in 1961. It was featured on his 1961 album Slim Harpo Sings "Raining in My Heart..." It is not to be confused with the similarly titled Buddy Holly song, "Raining in My Heart".

== Other charting versions ==
- Hank Williams Jr. featuring The Mike Curb Congregation released a version of the song as a single in 1971 which reached number 2 on the Canadian country chart, number 3 on the U.S. country chart, and number 108 on the U.S. pop chart.
- Jo-El Sonnier released a version of the song as a single in 1989 which reached number 35 on the U.S. country chart.

== Other versions ==
- Dorsey Burnette released a version of the song entitled "Rainin'" as a single in 1961, but it did not chart.
- Pretty Things released a version of the song on their 1965 album Get the Picture?
- Ray Anthony released a version of the song on his 1968 album Ray Anthony Now.
- Ironing Board Sam released a version of the song as a single in 1968, but it did not chart.
- Living Guitars released a version of the song on their 1971 album "For the Good Times" & Other Country Favorites.
- Tom Jones released a version of the song on his 1974 album Somethin' 'Bout You Baby I Like.
- Ken Goodwin released a version of the song on his 1976 album Memories.
- Neil Young and The Shocking Pinks released a version of the song on their 1983 album Everybody's Rockin'.
- Lazy Lester released a version of the song on his 1988 album Harp & Soul.
- The Fabulous Thunderbirds released a version of the song on their 1989 album Powerful Stuff.
- James Cotton featuring C.J. Chenier released a version of the song on Cotton's 2004 album Baby Don't You Tear My Clothes.

Note: Al Green co-wrote and recorded a song called "Rainin' in My Heart" on his 2003 album, I Can't Stop (and subsequently recorded as a duet with Willie Nelson on Nelson's 2004 album, Outlaws and Angels). Certain song databases have mistakenly classified Green's song as a cover of Slim Harpo's "Rainin' in My Heart", written by James Moore (aka Slim Harpo) and Jerry West (aka J.D. Miller). The lyrics of the two songs are completely unrelated except for the title.
