= Everybody's Rockin' =

Studio album by Neil Young and the Shocking Pinks
- Released: July 27, 1983
- Recorded: April – May 1983
- Studios: Modern Recorders, Redwood City, California
- Genre: Rockabilly
- Length: 24:55
- Label: Geffen
- Producers: Elliot Mazer; Neil Young

Neil Young chronology
Trans (1982)	Everybody's Rockin' (1983)	Old Ways (1985)

Singles from Everybody's Rockin'
- 1. "Wonderin'" / "Payola Blues" Released: August 1983; 2. "Cry, Cry, Cry" / "Payola Blues" Released: November 1983

Everybody's Rockin' is the fourteenth studio album by Canadian-American musician Neil Young, released on July 27, 1983. The album was recorded with the Shocking Pinks, a band assembled just for the occasion, and features a selection of rockabilly songs, both covers and original material. Running at 25 minutes, it is Young's shortest album. Everybody's Rockin' is typical of his 1980s period in that it bears little or no resemblance to the album released before it (1982's Trans, a synth-heavy, electro-rock album), nor the one released after it (1985's Old Ways, which is pure country).

== Background ==
Having already created tension with his label, Geffen Records, with the previous year's Trans, in 1983 Young offered the label a country album he had recorded the previous fall called Old Ways. Young's music had previously shown the influence of country music, including his most successful album, Harvest (1972). Geffen, however, reeling from the commercial and critical failure of Trans, rejected Old Ways and demanded "a rock & roll album". Young explains for PBS' American Masters:

"They said, 'Hey Neil, you've got to make a rock and roll record, you just have to.' I said, 'Do you know what rock and roll is?' and there was kind of a silence and then I tried to figure out what it was. And then I thought in my mind, 'Rock and roll, what the hell is rock and roll? Let's go back in time to when rock and roll started and try to see what it is.'"

Young went into the studio and quickly produced an album with a sound reminiscent of the early period of rock & roll, including Jimmy Reed's "Bright Lights, Big City" and "Mystery Train", recorded by Elvis Presley in his early days at Sun Records. The production included 1950s-style vocal reverb and backing choruses. Most songs were Young originals, such as "Kinda Fonda Wanda" that had originally been written to amuse his wife. Young wrote the song "Wonderin'" long before the sessions for Everybody's Rockin'. It dates from at least the After the Gold Rush era, and was part of his setlist at solo acoustic shows in 1970, as well as at Woodstock with Crosby, Stills, Nash, and Young in 1969.

"Wonderin'" and "Cry, Cry, Cry" were released as singles and both featured accompanying music videos, but MTV gave them little airtime. As with Trans, Young conducted a supporting tour for Everybody's Rockin' and played material from the album live despite the poor reception and low attendance at his concerts.

According to Young, Everybody's Rockin' had been intended to be a concept album, with two additional songs, "Get Gone" and "Don't Take Your Love Away from Me", that would have "given a lot more depth to The Shocking Pinks". However, an infuriated Geffen Records cancelled the recording sessions, preventing Young from finishing the album, and released it as it was. The two songs later appeared on Young's compilation Lucky Thirteen.

Young explained the inspiration for the album in 1995, saying that "there was very little depth to the material obviously. They were all 'surface' songs. But see, there was a time when music was like that, when all pop stars were like that. And it was good music, really good music. Plus it was a way of further destroying what I'd already set up. Without doing that, I wouldn't be able to do what I'm doing now. If I build something up, I have to systematically tear it right down before people decide, 'Oh that's how we can define him.'" He also said of his rockabilly persona, "I was that guy for a year and a half, almost like being in a movie."

== Writing ==
The song "Payola Blues" satirizes the business side of the music industry and Young's troubled relationship with Geffen, suggesting that the payola scandal days of the Alan Freed era never really went away. In a 1986 interview with Bill Flanagan, Young explains: "I guess...it was kind of an embarrassment to some people. But it was all in good fun. That's the way it is anyway, everybody knows that. It's all about money, the whole thing. Anybody who thinks it isn't is kidding themselves and everybody else. Because what goes on in parking lots is nobody's business but those people who are there, and believe me they're out there. This is still America. I know what payola is and there are different kinds of payola; there is payola where the artist puts his money into it, and there is payola where the record company puts their money into it."

"Wonderin'" dates back to 1970 and the sessions for the album After the Gold Rush. Young would perform the song with Crazy Horse during their tour that year. The song would feature on the Archives release Live at the Fillmore East in 2006. Young also made an effort to record the song during the sessions for Tonight's the Night in 1973.

The music video, directed by Tim Pope, features Young driving around in a pink convertible, filmed at half-speed to show Young and the group out of touch with the world zooming by around them. Young explained in an October 1983 Rockline interview: "We played back the music at half speed and I lipped the words at half speed, then everything in the background was going at regular speed, so when we played it back at normal speed, everything in the background was going twice as fast. When we transferred it from 16mm to videotape, there is a slight jump in the transfer which gave it a slight jerky quality as well: A Keystone Cops type of quality."

== Reception and legacy ==
Professional ratings
Review scores
Source	Rating
AllMusic	2/5 stars
Christgau's Record Guide	C+

At the time of its release, Everybody's Rockin' received some of the worst critical reviews of Young's career. Robert Christgau of The Village Voice wrote that "The covers are redundant or worse, as are all but two of the originals....I hope Neil realizes that for all the horrible truth of 'Payola Blues,' nobody's three thou's gonna get this on top forty." New Musical Express added: "At least Neil Young has yet resisted rejoining Crosby, Stills and Nash, although this foray into rockabilly pastiche is hardly much less regressive than that."

Young himself expressed fondness for the album, comparing it favorably to his acclaimed 1975 album Tonight's the Night, yet also acknowledging the truth of some of its harsher criticisms: "What am I? Stupid? Did people really think I put that out thinking it was the greatest fuckin' thing I'd ever recorded? Obviously I'm aware it's not."

Everybody's Rockin' was included in Q magazine's 2006 list of the 50 worst albums ever made.

=== Lawsuit ===
In November 1983, following the commercial failure of Everybody's Rockin', Geffen Records sued Young for $3.3 million (about $10 million in 2023), on the grounds that this record and its predecessor were "not commercial", and "musically uncharacteristic of [his] previous recordings." Young filed a $21 million countersuit (about $65 million in 2023), alleging breach of contract since Young had been promised no creative interference from the label.

The suit backfired against Geffen, with label owner David Geffen personally apologizing to Young for the suit and for interference with his work. Reflecting on the album and the lawsuit on his website, Young states "No hard feelings."

The year before the lawsuit, just after Young had signed to Geffen, his longtime manager Elliot Roberts was asked why Young had changed labels, and said, "I did have a much larger offer from RCA, about $4 million more. David Geffen and I used to be partners and David has worked with Neil for a very long time. He totally relates to Neil as an artist and has no preconceived notions about Neil. He knows that he's capable of doing anything at any point, at any time... He will have the freedom to practice his art as he sees it, as opposed to when you make a deal where someone is paying you $1-2 million an album you feel obligated to give them commercial music that they can sell large numbers of. Neil's not concerned with selling large numbers of his records, he's concerned with making records that he's pleased with. Unfortunately they are not always commercial from the record company's point of view. David Geffen relates to that. He knows Neil may do a country album and then he may do an electric album because there's no rhyme or reason with Neil. It's what he's moved by."

== Track listing ==
Side one
No.	Title	Writer(s)	Length
1.	"Betty Lou's Got a New Pair of Shoes"	Bobby Freeman	3:02
2.	"Rainin' in My Heart"	Slim Harpo, Jerry West	2:11
3.	"Payola Blues"	Ben Keith, Neil Young	3:09
4.	"Wonderin'"	Young	2:59
5.	"Kinda Fonda Wanda"	Tim Drummond, Young	1:51

Side two
No.	Title	Writer(s)	Length
1.	"Jellyroll Man"	Young	2:00
2.	"Bright Lights, Big City"	Jimmy Reed	2:18
3.	"Cry, Cry, Cry"	Young	2:39
4.	"Mystery Train"	Junior Parker, Sam Phillips	2:47
5.	"Everybody's Rockin'"	Young	1:57

== Personnel ==
- Neil Young – vocals, piano, guitar, harmonica, production

The Shocking Pinks

- Larry Byrom – backing vocals, piano
- Anthony Crawford – backing vocals
- Tim Drummond – upright bass
- Karl Himmel – snare drum
- Ben Keith – alto saxophone, lead guitar
- Rick Palombi – backing vocals

Additional roles

- Elliot Mazer – production
- Dennis Keeley, Rebeca Keeley – photography
- Tommy Steele, Art Hotel – art design
- Elliot Roberts – direction
- Tim Mulligan, John Nowland, Mike Herbick – engineering
- George Horn – mastering

== Charts ==
Chart (1983)	Peak position
Canada Top Albums/CDs (RPM)	22
Dutch Albums (Album Top 100)	29
Finnish Albums (Suomen virallinen lista)	29
German Albums (Offizielle Top 100)	61
New Zealand Albums (RMNZ)	21
Norwegian Albums (VG-lista)	18
Swedish Albums (Sverigetopplistan)	15
UK Albums (Official Charts)	50
US Billboard 200	46
