= You Need to Live a Little =

Studio album by Larry Garner
- Released: 1995
- Recorded: March 1994
- Genre: Blues; swamp blues
- Length: 63:33
- Label: Gitanes; Verve
- Producer: John Snyder

Larry Garner chronology
Too Blues (1994)	You Need to Live a Little (1995)	Baton Rouge (1995)

You Need to Live a Little is an album by the American musician Larry Garner, released in 1995. Garner's contract with Gitanes/Verve Records allowed him to quit his day job in order to promote the album. He supported it with United Kingdom and North American tours.

== Production ==
Garner was signed to Gitanes/Verve after successful shows at the Parisian nightclub New Morning. You Need to Live a Little was produced by John Snyder. Willie Weeks played bass on the album. David "Fathead" Newman played a saxophone solo on "Miracles of Time"; Garner wrote a letter to Gladys Knight, his favorite singer, to ask if she had listened to the song as he wanted her to cover it. The Legendary White Trash Horns contributed to a few tracks. Garner considered his lyrics to be of an observational nature, touching on problems in his own life that were also universal. "Four Cars Running" describes the financial burden of supporting grown children. "Rats and Roaches in My Kitchen" is a cover of the Silas Hogan song, on which Sonny Landreth played slide guitar. The album is dedicated to Hogan.

== Critical reception ==
Professional ratings
Review scores
Source	Rating
AllMusic	4.5/5 stars
MusicHound Blues: The Essential Album Guide	4/5 stars

The Times Colonist wrote that "Garner's gifts for songwriting, singing, guitar playing, and arranging shine through the recording's unpretentious stance." OffBeat determined that "the moody urgings of the title track open with a minor-key arrangement that recalls the jazzy 1eanings of the Allman Brothers classic instrumental 'In Memory of Elizabeth Reed'." The Colorado Springs Gazette-Telegraph noted that "although his roots are in Louisiana swamp blues—characterized by bleak guitar grooves and shuffled backbeats—Garner's music is surprisingly fresh and soulful." The Home News & Tribune listed You Need to Live a Little among the best blues albums of 1995.

The Chicago Tribune said that You Need to Live a Little "showcases a witty, innovative writer and tasty guitarist who refuses to limit himself to standard 12-bar forms." The Michigan Chronicle opined that "Miracles of Time" "may be among the decade's most enduring songs." The Record labeled Garner "a wittier version of Albert Collins." The Miami New Times stated that "Garner's guitar playing services the song, rather than vice versa, although he squeezes off some clean B.B. King-like solos."

AllMusic called Garner "a witty, imaginative songwriter, crisply concise guitarist, and convincing singer". MusicHound Blues: The Essential Album Guide considered the title track, "Nobody's Special", and "Another Bad Day" to be "moody, minor-key masterpieces".

== Track listing ==
1. "Another Bad Day" – 4:59
2. "Someone New" – 3:20
3. "Miracles of Time" – 4:51
4. "Four Cars Running" – 5:01
5. "Live a Little" – 6:16
6. "The Preacher Man" – 7:37
7. "Shak Bully" – 5:18
8. "Rats and Roaches in My Kitchen" – 5:52
9. "Don't Run Talking" – 4:56
10. "Keep Playing the Blues" – 6:14
11. "Had to Quit Drinking" – 3:50
12. "Nobody's Special" – 5:19
