= This Should Go On Forever =

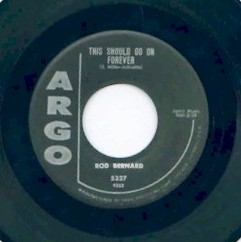

Single by Rod Bernard
- Released: October 1958
- Recorded: 1958, MasterTrak Studio, Louisiana
- Genre: Swamp pop
- Length: 2:49
- Label: Jin / Argo
- Songwriter(s): J. D. "Jay" Miller/Bernard Jolivette
- Producer(s): J. D. "Jay" Miller

"This Should Go On Forever" is a popular song of the south Louisiana rock and roll genre known as swamp pop. It was written by J. D. "Jay" Miller and Bernard Jolivette

== Background ==
King Karl (real name Bernard Jolivette), a black Creole swamp pop musician, composed the song around 1958. (Producer J. D. "Jay" Miller was listed as a co-writer even though he did not actually help to compose the tune.) Karl intended to record the song for the Excello label of Nashville, for which he, his bandmate Guitar Gable (Gabriel Perrodin), and their band the Musical Kings had recorded other swamp pop compositions. Excello did not like the song, however, and as a result Karl's version at first remained unreleased.

In the meantime, Cajun swamp pop musician Rod Bernard of Opelousas, Louisiana, heard Karl and his group perform the tune at the local Moonlight Inn nightclub. When Bernard learned that Excello had no intention of releasing the song, he asked Karl if he could record it for Floyd Soileau's newly formed Jin label of Ville Platte, Louisiana. Karl approved, and Bernard and his group, the Twisters, recorded the song that year for Jin, using the same studio — Miller's MasterTrak Studio of Crowley, Louisiana — that Karl and his band had used to record their still-unreleased original version.

In late 1958, Bernard's version became a regional hit in south Louisiana and east Texas, and, licensed to the Argo label of Chicago. In the US, it rose to the top 20 on the Billboard Hot 100 and R&B chart in 1959. Surprised by the song's success, Excello quickly released King Karl's original version. Other groups sought to record the song, by then, the general public regarded Bernard's version as the authoritative version. As a result, it was Bernard who appeared on American Bandstand, the Alan Freed Show, and elsewhere.

== Chart positions ==
Chart (1959)	Peak position
U.S. Billboard Hot 100	20
U.S. Billboard Hot R&B Sides chart	12
Canada (CHUM)	14

== Cover versions ==
Other swamp pop groups, released their own versions of the song to capitalize on Bernard's success including:

- Doug Charles and the Boogie Kings
- Gene Terry and the Downbeats
- It has also been covered by Mike Ladd on Shadow Records NR8816 and is credited only to "J. Miller" on the 45 label.

== Sources ==
- Shane K. Bernard, Swamp Pop: Cajun and Creole Rhythm and Blues (Jackson: University Press of Mississippi, 1996).
- John Broven, South to Louisiana: Music of the Cajun Bayous (Gretna: Pelican, 1983).
