= I'm a King Bee =

Song written by Slim Harpo

Single by Slim Harpo
- B-side: "Got Love If You Want It"
- Released: July 1957
- Recorded: March 1957
- Studio: J. D. Miller, Crowley, Louisiana
- Genre: Blues
- Length: 2:55
- Label: Excello
- Songwriter: James Moore a.k.a. Slim Harpo
- Producer: J. D. Miller

"I'm a King Bee" is a swamp blues song written and first recorded by Slim Harpo in 1957. It has been performed and recorded by numerous blues and other artists since. In 2008, Slim Harpo's original recording received a Grammy Hall of Fame Award.

== Original song ==
Written by Slim Harpo, whose legal name was James Moore, the song was recorded in March 1957. The recording features a spare arrangement and instrumentation typical of J. D. Miller's production approach. Accompanying Slim Harpo were Gabriel "Guitar Gable" Perrodin on guitar, John "Fats" Perrodin on bass, and Clarence "Jockey" Etienne on drums.

The song has an irregular number of bars (as opposed to the standard 12 bars). According to blues historian Gerard Herzhaft, it is derived from songs by Memphis Minnie, Bo Carter, and Muddy Waters and uses the rhythm figure from "Rockin' and Rollin'" by Lil' Son Jackson. Baton Rouge, Louisiana-based Excello Records originally released it in 1957 as the B-side to his debut solo single, "I Got Love if You Want It".

== The Rolling Stones version ==
English rock band The Rolling Stones recorded "I'm a King Bee" for their 1964 debut album. It has been identified as an early important song for The Rolling Stones, although it was not released as a single. The band's arrangement generally follows Slim Harpo's, but includes a slide-guitar break by Brian Jones. The personnel consisted of Jagger on vocals and harmonica, Jones on slide guitar, Keith Richards on acoustic guitar, Bill Wyman on bass guitar, and Charlie Watts on drums. Later, Mick Jagger commented "What's the point in listening to us doing 'I'm a King Bee' when you can hear Slim Harpo do it?"

== Grateful Dead version ==
The Grateful Dead performed "I'm a King Bee" over 40 times, with the first known at the Fillmore Auditorium in San Francisco on January 8, 1966, and the last in Ann Arbor on December 15, 1971. Sung by Ron "Pigpen" McKernan, who also played harmonica for the song, well-known performances include Fillmore West in San Francisco on February 28, 1969; Thelma Theater in Los Angeles on December 12, 1969; Capitol Theater in Port Chester on November 6, 1970 (featuring Jerry Garcia on slide); and Fillmore East in New York on February 28, 1971. After Pigpen's death in 1973, the Grateful Dead tried out an arrangement with Bob Weir on vocals in Los Angeles on December 8, 1993, and at the Omni in Atlanta on March 31, 1994, but it did not stick.

== Pink Floyd version ==
The Tea Set, which became Pink Floyd, recorded "I'm a King Bee" and several other songs in December 1964. The recording features Syd Barrett, Bob Klose, Roger Waters, Richard Wright and Nick Mason. When it was officially issued on the vinyl-only 1965: Their First Recordings (2015), it became the only cover song ever released by Pink Floyd. The song was later issued for the first time on CD as part of The Early Years 1965–1972 box set in November 2016, along with the other songs recorded in December 1964.

== John Belushi version ==
John Belushi performed "I'm a King Bee" on the January 17, 1976, broadcast of NBC's Saturday Night, with Belushi and the show's house band dressed in bee costumes and bandleader Howard Shore dressed as a beekeeper. Guest host Buck Henry introduced them as "Howard Shore and his All-Bee Band". At the end, Belushi repeated four of the song's last five words several times in different vocal styles for comic effect.

== Recognition ==
In 2008, Slim Harpo's "I'm a King Bee" received a Grammy Hall of Fame Award, which "honor[s] recordings of lasting qualitative or historical significance". The song has been recorded by a variety of musicians.
