= Red Mud (album) =

Studio album by Chris Thomas King
- Released: 1998
- Genre: Blues
- Length: 53:54
- Label: Black Top
- Producers: Hammond Scott; Chris Thomas King

Chris Thomas King chronology
Chris Thomas King (1997)	Red Mud (1998)	Me, My Guitar and the Blues (2000)

Red Mud is an album by the American musician Chris Thomas King, released in 1998. King supported the album with a North American tour. Red Mud was nominated for a W. C. Handy Award for "Acoustic Blues Album of the Year". King promoted the album on NPR, where he was heard by the casting director of O Brother, Where Art Thou?

== Production ==
King decided to make an acoustic blues album after his former label, Scotti Bros., was sold. His father, Tabby Thomas, sang on the cover of his song "Hoodoo Party" and duetted with King on "Bus Station Blues". "Rambling on My Mind" and "Come On in My Kitchen" are versions of the Robert Johnson songs. "Death Letter Blues" was written by Son House. King played a dobro or resonator guitar on many of the tracks and used sampled strings on a few. "Wanna Die with a Smile on My Face" is a rerecording of an earlier King song. The title track is about a man contemplating marriage to a twice-married woman. King employed hip hop vocalizing on "Alive".

== Critical reception ==
Professional ratings
Review scores
Source	Rating
The Age	4/5 stars
The Philadelphia Inquirer	3/4 stars
Pittsburgh Post-Gazette	3/4 stars
The Tampa Tribune	2.5/4 stars

The Pittsburgh Post-Gazette wrote that "fans of traditional blues should appreciate King's talents in interpreting the music, and his innovative efforts to stretch its limits." The Age praised the "compelling, resonant vocals and intricate guitar work." The Record said that "King tackles straight-ahead acoustic blues with power and vision." The Washington Post opined that "his latest style has seemed more a coat he's just trying on than a jacket he's lived in long enough to wear comfortably." The Philadelphia Inquirer stated that "King brings a quiet authority to this style of music."

== Track listing ==
No.	Title	Length
1.	"Red Mud"	4:09
2.	"If It Ain't One Thang, It's Two"	3:58
3.	"Soon This Morning Blues"	3:48
4.	"Come On in My Kitchen"	4:23
5.	"I'm on Fire"	3:30
6.	"Sinking Feeling"	3:01
7.	"Alive"	3:42
8.	"Dark Cloud"	3:18
9.	"Hoodoo Party"	3:42
10.	"Rambling on My Mind"	3:04
11.	"Wanna Die with a Smile on My Face"	2:52
12.	"Death Letter Blues"	5:26
13.	"Bus Station Blues"	4:04
14.	"Raining Angels"	4:57
Total length:		53:54
