= Cry of the Prophets =

Studio album by Chris Thomas
- Released: 1990
- Genre: Blues
- Label: HighTone/Sire
- Producers: Bruce Bromberg, Chris Thomas

Chris Thomas chronology
The Beginning (1986)	Cry of the Prophets (1990)	Simple (1993)

Cry of the Prophets is an album by the American blues musician Chris Thomas, released in 1990.

== Production ==
The album was written and recorded in Austin, Texas. It was produced by Bruce Bromberg and Thomas.

== Critical reception ==
Professional ratings
Review scores
Source	Rating
AllMusic	4.5/5 stars
Chicago Tribune	3/4 stars
Robert Christgau	(dud)
The Encyclopedia of Popular Music	3/5 stars
Houston Chronicle	3/4 stars
Los Angeles Times	3/5 stars
The Rolling Stone Album Guide	3/5 stars
St. Petersburg Times	2/5 stars

The Chicago Tribune wrote that Thomas's "keening guitar solos never overstay their welcome and his lyrics brim with urgency." The Los Angeles Times deemed the album "a strange brew of deep soul, country blues, modern funk, Hendrix and Marley that falls somewhere between a more rockin' Robert Cray and a Lenny Kravitz without the Lennonisms." Greil Marcus, in The Village Voice, praised the "deep soul guitar" and "deep soul crying," writing that "up against the likes of N.W.A., Thomas sounds pathetic—but also real." The Washington Post thought that Cry of the Prophets contained "some of the year's most pleasurable music," writing that it's "a groundbreaking fusion of '60s Southern soul singing, '70s rock 'n' roll guitar and '80s funk rhythms." LA Weekly said that the album "claims and revitalizes a lot of African-American heritage without any fuss."

== Track listing ==
No.	Title	Length
1.	"Angel Lady"	0:55
2.	"Heart & Soul"	4:14
3.	"Wanna Die with a Smile on My Face"	3:24
4.	"Help Us, Somebody"	5:43
5.	"Dance to the Music Till My Savior Comes"	3:59
6.	"I'm Gonna Make It"	5:00
7.	"Alpha-Omega"	4:16
8.	"All Nite Long"	3:20
9.	"Last Real Man"	4:37
10.	"I Need You"	4:04
11.	"Cry of the Prophets"	3:25
