= Silas Hogan =

American blues musician

- Born: September 15, 1911; Westover, West Baton Rouge Parish, Louisiana, United States
- Died: January 9, 1994 (aged 82) Baton Rouge, Louisiana, United States
- Genres: Blues
- Occupations: Singer, guitarist, songwriter
- Instruments: Vocals, guitar
- Labels: Excello, Arhoolie, Blue Horizon, Flyright

Silas Hogan (September 15, 1911 – January 9, 1994) was an American blues musician who played swamp blues and Louisiana blues. His most notable recordings are "Airport Blues" and "Lonesome La La". He was the front man of the Rhythm Ramblers. Hogan was inducted into the Louisiana Blues Hall of Fame.

== Biography ==
Hogan learned to play the guitar as a teenager and was performing regularly by the late 1930s. He was influenced by Jimmy Reed, as were Lazy Lester and Slim Harpo. He had relocated to Baton Rouge, Louisiana, by the early 1950s and, equipped with a Fender electric guitar, formed the Rhythm Ramblers, with Isaiah Chapman (lead guitar), Jimmy Dotson (drums), and Sylvester Buckley (harmonica). They stayed together for almost ten years and contributed to the development of the Baton Rouge blues sound,

In 1962, when Hogan was 51, Slim Harpo introduced him to J. D. "Jay" Miller, a record producer based in Crowley, Louisiana. Miller, through the offices of Excello Records, started Hogan's recording career, at a time when interest in variations of swamp blues was waning. Several singles by Hogan were nevertheless released until 1965, when Miller's disagreement with the record label's new owners brought the recording contract to an abrupt end. On some of his recordings, Hogan was backed by the harmonica player Moses "Whispering" Smith. Hogan had to disband the group and returned to his full-time job at the Exxon oil refinery. In the late 1970s, he recorded additional tracks for Arhoolie and Blue Horizon.

Hogan died in January 1994 of heart disease, at the age of 82.

== Discography ==
=== Albums ===
Year	Title	Label
1971	Trouble at Home	Blue Horizon
1972	Trouble	Excello
1989	I'm a Free Hearted Man	Flyright
1995	Trouble: Best of the Excello Masters	Excello/AVI Records
1995	So Long Blues	Ace
1999	The Godfather	Wolf Records

=== Compilation albums ===
Year	Title	Label	Song by Hogan
1976	Gonna Head for Home	Flyright	"I'm a Free-Hearted Man"
1976	Rooster Crowed for Day	Flyright	"My Baby Walked Out", "Tell Me Baby"
1999	The Excello Story, Vol. 4: 1961–1975	Hip-O Records	"Trouble at Home Blues"
2002	Genuine Excello R&B	Ace	"Go On Pretty Baby"

== See also ==
- List of Louisiana blues musicians
- List of swamp blues musicians
