= Marion James =

American blues singer (1934–2015)

Background information
- Born: Marion Agness James; October 8, 1934; Nashville, Tennessee, U.S.
- Died: December 31, 2015 (aged 81) Nashville, Tennessee, U.S.
- Genres: Blues, rhythm and blues
- Occupations: Singer, songwriter
- Years active: 1960s–2015
- Label: Various

Marion Agness James (October 8, 1934 – December 31, 2015) was an American blues singer and songwriter. She was considered Nashville's "Queen of the Blues". Her career spanned 60 years, and she had a hit with a song she wrote, "That's My Man".

A flamboyant character, James was known to sign her name adding "The Blues Queen" and often wore a tiara at her live performances.

== Life and career ==
James was born into a musical family in Nashville, Tennessee. Her mother was the pianist at her local church, her sister sang with the Clara Ward Singers, and some of her cousins were professional musicians. James herself sought inspiration in listening to blues singers at vaudeville shows and from her mother's record collection. James came to fame in the blues clubs of Jefferson Street in the early 1960s. Before she earned the title of Nashville's Queen of the Blues, she was called "House Rockin James".

Jimi Hendrix was a member of her band when he first started playing the guitar professionally, and she also had Billy Cox in her backing lineup. In 1966, James had a top ten hit single with "That's My Man", a song she composed, released by Excello Records. She continued to perform until the mid-1980s, when she took a break from traveling. By the early part of the 1990s, James had met Casey Lutton and joined his group, the Hypnotics. In 1996, Appaloosa Records released the album Marion James & the Hypnotics. After that, she shared the stage with many notable performers, including Chick Willis, Rufus Thomas, and Clarence "Gatemouth" Brown.

In 2003, her album Essence was released by Soulfood Records. Among those playing on the record were Beegie Adair, Reese Wynans, Jack Pearson (The Allman Brothers), the bassist Bob Babbitt, and the drummer Chucki Burke. Her album Northside Soul, issued by EllerSoul Records in 2012, reached number 10 on the Living Blues chart. In 2013, she recorded "Back in the Day" at Washington's Jefferson Street Sound recording studios. It recalled the time when Jefferson Street was lined with smoke-filled nightclubs, which played host to Little Richard, B.B. King, Jimi Hendrix and James.

James helped retired musicians in need, by founding the Marion James Aid Society. In addition, for more than 30 years, she organized a Musicians Reunion Benefit. She led a campaign to erect two statues, of Jimi Hendrix and Little Richard, on Jefferson Street. Her career was highlighted in an exhibit at the Country Music Hall of Fame and Museum entitled "Night Train to Nashville: Music City Rhythm & Blues 1945–1970".

James died on December 31, 2015, at the age of 81, in her hometown, from the effects of a stroke.

== Discography ==
=== Albums ===
Year	Title	Record label
1996	Marion James & the Hypnotics	Appaloosa Records
2003	Essence	Soulfood Records
2012	Northside Soul	EllerSoul Records
