= Doc Guidry =

American fiddle player

Oran "Doc" Guidry
- "Doc" Guidry - King of the Cajun Fiddlers

Background information
- Also known as: King of the Cajun Fiddlers
- Born: April 28, 1918; Lafayette, Louisiana, U.S.
- Died: November 10, 1992 (aged 74); Lafayette, Louisiana, U.S.
- Genres: Cajun
- Occupation(s): Musician, fiddle player
- Instrument: Cajun fiddle

Oran "Doc" Guidry (April 28, 1918 – November 10, 1992) was an American Cajun and country music fiddler. Some of his best known recordings include "Wondering", "Colinda", "Crowley Two Step", and "Chere Cherie".

== Biography ==
Born April 28, 1918 in Lafayette, Louisiana, Oran Guidry learned to play the fiddle from his father, Cleopha.

== Career ==
Early on, in 1936, he began recording with Happy Fats' Rayne-Bo Ramblers and Hackberry Ramblers' Joe Werner. There, they recorded a slew of recordings for Bluebird. By 1938, he had scored a chance to record with David Kapp's Decca Records and formed the "Sons of Acadians" band.

After World War II, he would continue performing, recording and broadcasting with Happy Fats forming the group "Happy, Doc and the Boys" (or sometimes listed "Hadacol Boys"). These would be featured on J. D. "Jay" Miller's new Fais Do Do label. However, other groups would also use Doc's fiddle and electric mandolin in their recordings. Bill Hutto had him playing on his recordings during the 1950s. He even toured the country with Jimmie Davis where he would make his signature 1953 recording of "Chere Cherie" with L. J. Blanc at a session in Nashville, TN. Together, they played on the Louisiana Hayride and the Grand Ole Opry. In May of that year, Billboard Magazine stated the song was a "pretty ballad, sung in English and French by the Cajun folk artist, is presented gracefully. Might earn some regional action".

In 1962, Vin Bruce had him recording at a session at the KLFT radio station. He jumped in with Aldus Roger and his Lafayette Playboys at the La Louisianne studio in 1964 and 1965. In 1966, La Louisianne had him record a solo album. By 1968 in his last recordings, he joined Vin Bruce again in New Orleans at the Cosimo Matassa recording studio. In his later years, he would play blues, jazz and even some popular lounge music. At some point in the early 1980s, he toured Asia with Cajun legend D. L. Menard.

- Chere Cherie (1966)

== Legacy ==
Guidry would eventually be entered into the Cajun French Music Hall of Fame and the Country Music Hall of Fame.

== Discography ==
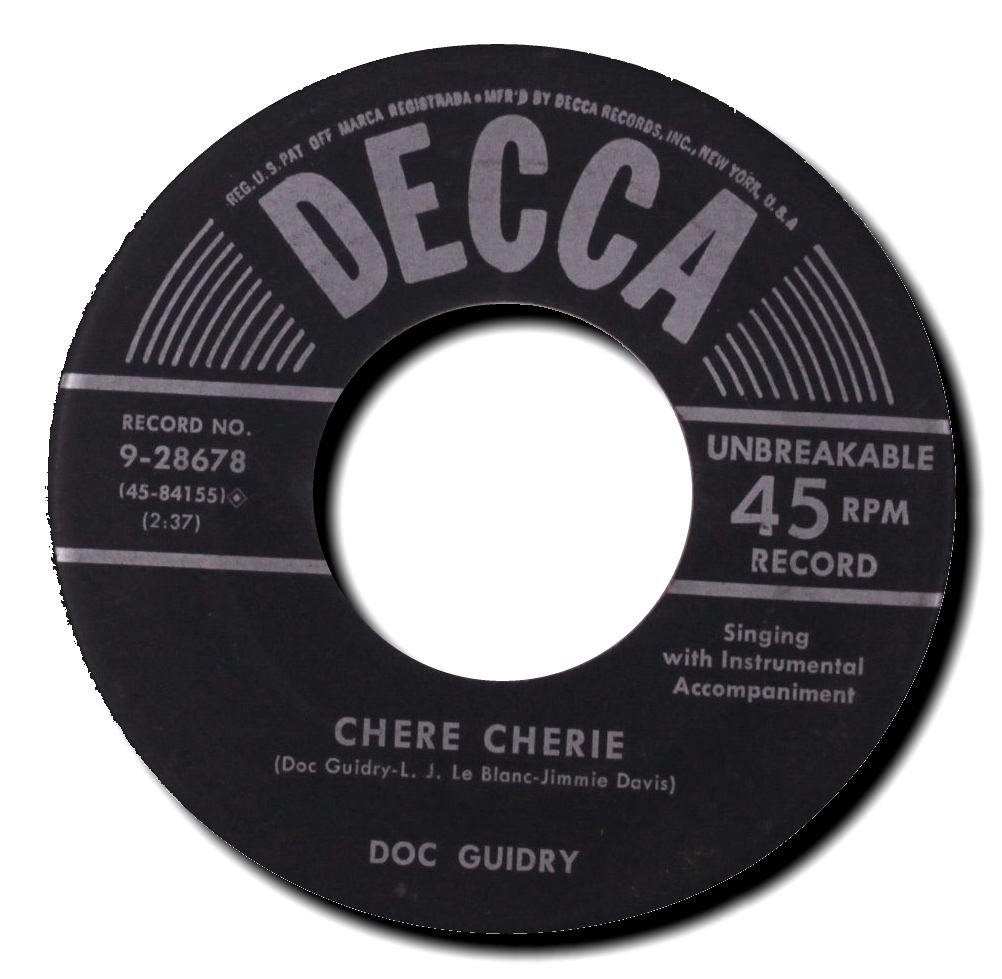
Chere Cherie, Decca Records

- Chere Cherie / The Little Fat Man (9-28678 Decca, 1953)
- Doc Guidry: King Of The Cajun Fiddlers (LL-115 LaLouisianne, ca.1966)
