= Kemah Bob =

American comedian (born 1994)

- Bob at the Edinburgh Festival Fringe in 2026
- Born: 20 March 1994 (age 32)
- Occupation: Stand-up comedian
- Years active: 2018–present
- Known for: It's a Sin: After Hours; Guessable
- Relatives: Camille Bob (grandfather)
- Website: Official website

Kemah Bob (born 20 March 1994) is an American comedian. She (Note: Bob uses she/they pronouns. This article uses she/her pronouns for consistency.) achieved fame in the United Kingdom, and is best known for hosting It's a Sin: After Hours.

== Early life ==
Bob grew up in Houston, Texas, and went to school in Waco, Texas. She has lived in California and London. Bob's grandfather was musician Camille Bob.

== Career ==
Bob started her comedy career in Los Angeles. She told Dave's Just Jokes in 2022 that she got into comedy after a theatre professor pulled her aside after a class and pointed out how talkative she was in class, but that he enjoyed some of her comments, and suggested that she audition for an improv team. She has cited The Inbetweeners and Skins as her inspiration to move to the UK.

Bob hosts a comedy night and podcast called FOC It Up, featuring comedians of colour who are not cisgender men. In 2019 she was a finalist in the Funny Women awards. She maintains a drag king persona, Lil' Test Ease, who is a conservative men's rights activist.

In 2021, she presented It's a Sin: After Hours. Later that year, she worked on the Comedy Central panel show Yesterday, Today and The Day Before, but quit after the first episode "in solidarity" with fellow comedian Sophie Duker over cuts to Duker's monologue about the conflict between Israel and Palestine. She co-hosted The Island with Tom Allen and Jason Forbes the following year. She also appeared on two weeks of Richard Osman's House of Games, both times attracting attention for her voice; she has also appeared on Don't Hate the Playaz, BBC Radio 4's Elephant in the Room, Guessable, CelebAbility, Apocalypse Wow, Sorry, I Didn't Know, and Question Team, the latter with a cameo from Lil' Test Ease, as whom she appeared on Celebrity Karaoke Club: Drag Edition.

In 2026, Bob announced she would be hosting FOC IT UP! Fest, an event celebrating women, queer, trans, and nonbinary comedians, in April at the Soho Theatre.

== Personal life ==
Bob uses she/they pronouns; in an interview with Metro, Bob said "I do identify as a woman, I use she/they pronouns, but there are so many unanswered questions that I don't feel the need to answer around my own gender identity". Bob is pansexual and queer, and mentioned in a 2022 interview that she was simultaneously dating two people. She has been outspoken about her experiences of racism, telling Dave's Just Jokes in 2022 that "there are a lot of places where I don't want to go, won't go, am fortunate to not have to go, [...] and I feel like back to Texas is one of them".

Bob has bipolar disorder, which she was diagnosed with the week of her twentieth birthday after a friend called her mother to complain that the speed of her speech had increased to the point of incomprehensibility. Her mother responded to this by driving four hours from Houston to Waco to perform a wellness check, only for Bob to swear and shout at her, which prompted her to take Bob to the emergency room.

== Awards and nominations ==
Year	Award	Category	Result	Ref.
2019	Funny Women	Funny Women 2019	Finalist	
2019	BBC New Comedy Award	BBC New Comedy Award 2019	Semi-Finalist	
