= Tivoli Theatre (Wimborne Minster) =

Theatre in Dorset, England

Coordinates: 50.8015°N 1.9888°W

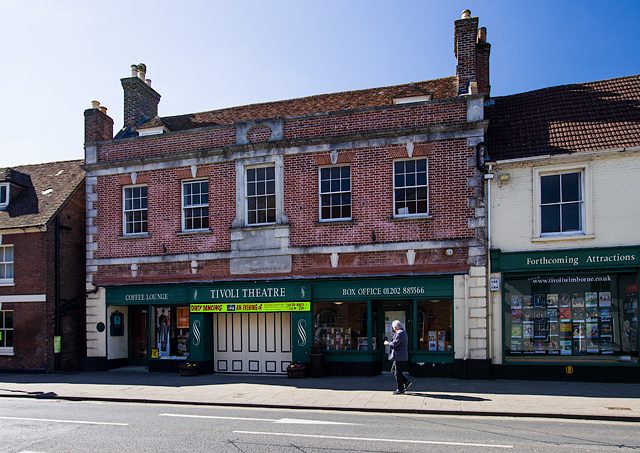
Tivoli Theatre

The Tivoli Theatre in Wimborne Minster, Dorset, England, was built in 1936 as a theatre and cinema. It has a variety of Art Deco features, including original chrome and Bakelite door handles.

Threatened with demolition in 1979 for a road-building scheme that was later abandoned, the theatre fell into disrepair and closed in April 1980. After lengthy campaigning, volunteers restored the theatre throughout 1993 and it reopened to the public in November of that year.

The theatre has since become a thriving live music venue, playing host to acts including The Searchers, Wishbone Ash, Acker Bilk, American blues artist Larry Garner, who recorded a live album there in October 2009, Charlie Watts and comedians Lee Evans, Al Murray and Eddie Izzard. The theatre also serves as the venue for the Wimborne Musical Theatre and the Wimborne Drama, who stage three productions each year.
