= Frank Hovington =

American blues musician (1919–1982)

Franklin Hovington (January 9, 1919 – June 21, 1982), also known as Guitar Frank, was an American blues musician. He played the guitar and banjo and sang in the Piedmont blues style. He lived in the vicinity of Frederica, Delaware.

Hovington was born in Reading, Pennsylvania. His style was modelled on Blind Boy Fuller, although he played the guitar using a strong thumb beat and experimented with styles of rhythm. On a tip from the folklorist Peter B. Lowry, he was recorded by Dick Spottswood and Bruce Bastin, with an album released on Flyright Records in the UK (available on CD) and on Rounder Records in the US. Selections were recorded by Axel Küstner and Siggi Christmann for German release, most recently issued by Evidence Records in the US.

He disliked travel and did not play away from his Delaware home, afraid that he would lose his welfare support payments, and so did not get the publicity from music festival appearances alone that his talent deserved.

He died in Felton, Delaware, in June 1982, at the age of 63.
