= Lonesome Sundown =

American blues musician and songwriter (1928–1995)

- Born: Cornelius Green III; December 12, 1928; Donaldsonville, Louisiana, United States
- Died: April 23, 1995 (aged 66); Gonzales, Louisiana, United States
- Genres: Blues
- Occupation(s): Musician, singer, songwriter, minister
- Instrument(s): Guitar, vocals, harmonica
- Years active: Early 1950s–1980
- Labels: Excello; HighTone

Cornelius Green III (December 12, 1928 – April 23, 1995), known professionally as Lonesome Sundown, was an American blues musician, best known for his swamp blues recordings for Excello Records in the 1950s and early 1960s.

== Early life ==
Green was born in 1928 on the Dugas Plantation near Donaldsonville, Louisiana. In 1948, at the age of 18, he moved to New Orleans and worked in various jobs, including porter at the New Southport Club, a casino in Jefferson Parish, at a hotel, a rice mill, and with a construction company. He returned to Donaldsonville by 1948 and, inspired by Muddy Waters and John Lee Hooker, began taking guitar lessons from a cousin. "Boogie Chillun," by John Lee Hooker was the first song that he learned to play.

== Music career ==
In 1953, after a brief period as a truck driver in Jeanerette, Louisiana, he moved again to work at the Gulf Oil refinery in Port Arthur, Texas. By this time he had begun to take his music more seriously, jamming at local clubs. In 1955 he was invited by Clifton Chenier to sit in with his new band, the Zydeco Ramblers, at the Blue Moon Club in Lake Charles. Chenier offered him the post of second guitarist in the band, alongside first guitarist Phillip Walker. Green toured with them as far as Chicago and Los Angeles, where Chenier's recording of "The Cat's Dreaming" was inspired by an incident in which Green fell asleep during a session and by the time Green auditioned for the producer Bumps Blackwell but failed to get a contract.

Green married later in 1955, left the Zydeco Ramblers, and moved to Opelousas, Louisiana, where he began playing with Lloyd Reynauld and writing his own songs. He recorded a demo tape and took it to the producer J. D. "Jay" Miller in Crowley. Miller was impressed, gave Green the stage name "Lonesome Sundown", and recorded his debut single, "Leave My Money Alone" backed with "Lost Without Love", which he leased to Excello Records in 1956. The follow-up, "My Home is a Prison" (later covered by Ronnie Earl and the Broadcasters featuring Kim Wilson on vocal/harmonica) backed with "Lonesome Whistler", was more successful, and Sundown became one of Miller's south Louisiana stable of musicians. He never had a chart hit, but he recorded for Miller for eight years, and his records sold in respectable quantities, his output including "Don't Say a Word" (featuring Lazy Lester on harmonica), "I'm a Mojo Man", "I Stood By (And Watched Another Man Steal My Gal)", "You Know I Love You", "Learn to Treat Me Better" (later covered by the Fabulous Thunderbirds), "My Home Ain't Here", and the much-covered "Gonna Stick to You Baby".

Sundown continued to work with Miller into the early 1960s. In 1964 he recorded "Hoo Doo Woman Blues" backed with "I've Got a Broken Heart", recordings which have been described as among "the last ethnic down-home blues 45s aimed exclusively at the Negro market". However, by 1965 Sundown had become disillusioned with his lack of success. He also endured a difficult divorce around this time, retired from the music industry to work as a laborer, and joined the Lord Jesus Christ of the Apostolic Faith Fellowship Throughout the World Church, of which he eventually became a minister. He was persuaded back to the recording studio in 1977 and recorded another blues album, Been Gone Too Long, co-produced by Bruce Bromberg and Dennis Walker, originally for Joliet Records. Despite its quality, its sales were disappointing, even after it was reissued by Alligator Records. His final single release was "I Betcha (You Gonna Do Your Thing Tonight)", in 1978.

Sundown played several concerts, including an appearance at the 1979 New Orleans Jazz & Heritage Festival and tours of Sweden and Japan with Phillip Walker, but then walked away from the music business for good. In 1994 he suffered a stroke and was no longer able to speak. He died in Gonzales, Louisiana, in April 1995, aged 66. He was posthumously inducted into the Louisiana Blues Hall of Fame in 2000.

== Musical style and influences ==
Unusually for Louisiana musicians, Sundown's style of the blues was more in keeping with the sound of Muddy Waters than that of Jimmy Reed. His sombre and melancholic recordings and instantly recognizable style were described by Miller as "the sound of the swamp". Reviewing the Been Gone Too Long LP in Christgau's Record Guide: Rock Albums of the Seventies (1981), Robert Christgau said:

"With his rounded rhythms, entertaining arrangements, good-hearted vocals, and Slim Harpo guitar, he is to Johnny Shines what the bayous are to the Delta—not as deep, but more fun."

== Selected discography ==
- Lonesome Sundown (AKA Lonesome Lonely Blues) (1970), Excello Records
- Been Gone Too Long (1977), Joliet; Alligator; HighTone
- I'm a Mojo Man: Best of the Excello Singles (1995), Excello/AVI Records
- Mojo Man: The Complete 1956–1962 Excello Singles (2020), Soul Jam [EU] Records

== See also ==
- List of swamp blues musicians
