= Flyright Records =

Record label

Flyright Records is a British record label incorporated in 1970 by Mike Leadbitter, Simon Napier, and Bruce Bastin. It specializes in reissues of American blues artists, but has issued some jazz by British musicians and some American jazz discs, including Ralph Sutton and Hoagy Carmichael.

One of the label’s most celebrated projects is The Legendary Jay Miller Sessions. This is a long-running series that has systematically reissued and compiled recordings produced by J.D. “Jay” Miller at his Crowley, Louisiana studio. Key artists have been Lightning Slim, Slim Harpo, Lazy Lester, Lonesome Sundown and Silas Hogan.

Piedmont and Southeastern blues have received special attention and includes field and studio recordings by artists such as Guitar Shorty, Lum Guffin, Frank Hovington, Peg Leg Sam, and various North Carolina and Virginia performers.

Chicago and postwar electric blues is also well represented. Including material from Magic Sam, Otis Rush and Junior Wells.

== See also ==
- Lists of record labels
