= Chris Thomas King =

American blues musician & actor (born 1962)

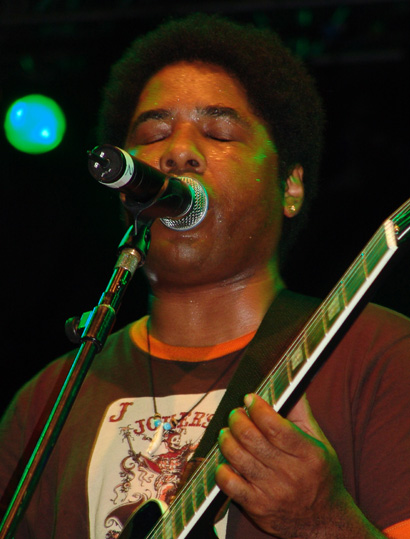
- Chris Thomas King at the Koh Samui Music Festival, 2005

Background information
- Born: Durwood Christopher Thomas; October 14, 1962 (age 64); Baton Rouge, Louisiana, United States
- Origin: New Orleans, Louisiana, United States
- Genres: Blues; hip hop; progressive soul
- Occupations: Musician, singer, actor
- Instruments: Guitar, piano
- Years active: 1984–present
- Labels: Black Top Records, 21st Century Blues Records, Scotti Bros. Records
- Website: ChrisThomasKing.com

Chris Thomas King (born Durwood Christopher Thomas, October 14, 1962) is an American blues musician, book author, and actor based in New Orleans, Louisiana.

== History ==
King was born in Baton Rouge, Louisiana, United States. He is the son of blues musician Tabby Thomas. His early recordings were released under the name Chris Thomas. He has won awards including "Album of the Year" for both Grammy Award and Country Music Awards. King has sold more than 10 million records in the United States. He is featured playing the part of Tommy Johnson in the Coen brothers' 2000 film O Brother, Where Art Thou?. He is also featured in Down from the Mountain and More Music from Ray soundtracks.

In June 2021, King's book The Blues: The Authentic Narrative of My Music And Culture was published by Chicago Review Press. The book posits that the blues and related genres derive from the urban and urbane Creole culture of New Orleans. He further argues that the received narrative of blues' genesis in the Mississippi Delta is both incorrect and that the narrative derives from erasure of New Orleans Creole accomplishments.

== Artistic career ==
King is a pioneer of rap/blues fusion. He conceived the first sample-based blues concept album in the early 1990s by writing and producing the first all-rap/blues album for RCA Records titled 21st Century Blues… from da Hood.

As an entrepreneur King took control of his master recordings in the early 1990s, forming 21st Century Blues Records. He also established a publishing company, Young Blues Rebel, LLC. 21st Century Records signed the New Orleans Ninth Ward rap/blues duo the 21C-B-Boyz and the London, England-based NuBlues, to 21st Century Blues Records in 2003.

King's acting career includes prominent roles in several films, including two music-related films. In the Oscar-winning film Ray he plays band leader and blues guitar player Lowell Fulson. During production he collaborated with Ray Charles in scoring the film. In O Brother, Where Art Thou?, he portrays a skilled blues guitarist who claims he sold his soul to the devil in exchange for his skill on guitar. The character is based on blues musicians Tommy Johnson and Robert Johnson, both of whom have been linked to selling their soul to the devil at a rural Mississippi crossroads. King also accompanies the film's band the Soggy Bottom Boys on guitar; his rendition of Skip James's "Hard Time Killing Floor Blues" was recorded live during filming and included on the film's Grammy Award-winning soundtrack.

King also starred in the Wim Wenders art house film The Soul of a Man, as Blind Willie Johnson and Kill Switch as Detective Storm with Steven Seagal.

== Filmography ==
- O Brother, Where Art Thou? (2000), as Tommy Johnson
- The Soul of a Man (2003), as Blind Willie Johnson
- Ray (2004), as Lowell Fulson
- Kill Switch (2008) as detective Storm Anderson
- Imagination Movers (2010) as T-Bone Crosby
- Treme (2011) HBO series.
- Quarry (2016) as Blues Musician

== Documentary appearances ==
- Last of the Mississippi Jukes (2003)
- Lightning in a Bottle (2004)
- The Soul of a Man (2003)
- 22nd Annual W.C. Handy Blues Awards (2001)
- Down from the Mountain (2000)
- Inside Look: Down from the Mountain (2000)

== Discography ==
- Blue Beat (1984) as Chris Thomas
- The Beginning (1986) as Chris Thomas
- Cry of the Prophets (1990) as Chris Thomas
- Help Us, Somebody single (1993) as Chris Thomas (also on Just Say Da compilation)
- Where the Pyramid Meets the Eye: A Tribute to Roky Erickson (1990)
- Simple (1993) as Chris Thomas
- 21st Century Blues... from da Hood (1994) as Chris Thomas
- Chris Thomas King (1997)
- Red Mud (1998)
- Whole Lotta Blues: The Songs of Led Zeppelin (1999)
- Me, My Guitar and the Blues (2000)
- O Brother, Where Art Thou? soundtrack (2000)
- Down from the Mountain (2001)
- The Legend of Tommy Johnson, Act 1: Genesis 1900s-1990s (2001)
- It's a Cold Ass World: The Beginning (2001)
- Dirty South Hip-Hop Blues (2002)
- A Young Man's Blues (2002)
- The Roots (2003)
- Along the Blues Highway (2003) with Blind Mississippi Morris
- Johnny's Blues: A Tribute to Johnny Cash (2003)
- Why My Guitar Screams & Moans (2004)
- Ray soundtrack (2004)
- Rise (2006)
- Live on Beale Street (2008)
- Antebellum Postcards (2011)
- Bona Fide (2012)
- Hotel Voodoo (2017)
- ANGOLA (2020)
