= Camille Bob =

American singer and musician

- Also known as: Lil 'Bob, Little Bob
- Born: November 7, 1937; Arnaudville, Louisiana, U.S.
- Died: July 6, 2015 (aged 77); Opelousas, Louisiana, U.S.
- Genres: Rhythm and blues
- Occupation(s): Singer, drummer, bandleader
- Years active: 1950s-2000s
- Labels: Goldband, Jin, La Louisianne
- Formerly of: Lil' Bob and the Lollipops

Camille Bob (November 7, 1937 – July 6, 2015), also known as Lil' Bob or Little Bob, was an American rhythm and blues singer and musician who led the dance band Lil' Bob and the Lollipops.

== Biography ==
He was born in Arnaudville, Louisiana, and started his music career in the mid-1950s as drummer in a band led by the unrelated Good Rockin' Bob. He soon formed his own dance band, The Lollipops, and first recorded for Goldband Records in Lake Charles in 1957.

As a singing drummer, Lil' Bob's band played Louisiana's dance halls and clubs in the 1960s. They recorded for various small local labels during the early and mid-1960s, before beginning a longer relationship with the La Louisianne label in 1965. The band became best known for their 1965 single "I Got Loaded", and the 1966 album Nobody But You. Many of their 1960s recordings have remained popular on the Northern soul circuit in Britain.

Lil' Bob joined the Jin label in 1968, releasing several singles and an album, Sweet Soul Swinger. From 1971, he recorded as Camille Bob for several local labels. His 1960s recordings for the La Louisianne label were compiled on the CD Little Bob & The Lollipops, issued in 2004. He was still active as a performer in Louisiana in the mid-2000s, but died of cancer in Opelousas General Hospital in 2015, aged 77. Bob was the grandfather of comedian Kemah Bob.

== Discography ==
=== Singles ===
- "Take It Easy Katy" (Goldband, 1958)
- "You Don't Have To Cry" (Carl, 1962)
- "Help Me Somebody" (Big Wheel, 1963)
- "Are You Ever Coming Home" / "Please Believe Me" (High-Up 101, 1963)
- "Mule Train" / "Please Don't Leave" (Tamm T-2005, 1964)
- "Nobody But You" / "I Got Loaded" (La Louisianne LL-8067, 1966)
- "So In Need" / "My Heart's On Fire" (La Louisianne LL-8075, 1966)
- "Life Can Be Lonely" / "Song For My Father" (La Louisiana LL-8078, 1966)
- "I Can't Take It" / "The High Road" (La Louisianne LL-8087, 1966)
- "We're In Love" / "Look Out Mr. Heartaches" (La Louisianne LL-8091, 1967)
- "Stop" / Soul Woman" (La Louisianne LL-8122, 1969)
- "I Don't Wanta Cry" / "Who Needs You So Bad" (Jin 45-222, 1969)
- "You Know It Ain't Right" / "Trouble In Mind" (Jin 45-225, 1969)
- "Peaches (You Got Love)" / "I Found Someone" (Jin 45-227, 1970)
- "I Wake Up Crying" / "Got To Get Away" (Whit 6906, 1971)
- "Brother Brown" / "2 Weeks, 2 Days, Too Long" (Soul Unlimited 102, 1972)
- "Kill That Roach" / "Harry Hippy" (Master Trak 3010, 1980)

=== Albums ===
- Nobody But You (La Louisianne, 1966)
- Sweet Soul Swinger (Jin, 1968)
- I Got Loaded (La Louisianne, 2004)
