= Lightnin' Slim =

American blues musician (1913–1974)

- Born: Otis Verries Hicks; March 13, 1913; Good Pine, Louisiana, U.S.
- Died: July 27, 1974 (aged 61) Detroit, Michigan, U.S.
- Genres: Louisiana blues; swamp blues
- Occupations: Musician; songwriter
- Instruments: Guitar; vocals
- Years active: 1940s–1973
- Labels: Excello; Stateside; Flyright Ace

Otis Verries Hicks (March 13, 1913 – July 27, 1974), known as Lightnin' Slim, was an American blues musician who played Louisiana blues and swamp blues for Excello Records.

== Biography ==
According to most sources, Otis Hicks was born on a farm outside St. Louis, Missouri, but the researchers Bob Eagle and Eric LeBlanc stated, on the basis of his draft card, that he was born in Good Pine, Louisiana. Prison records from Louisiana State Penitentiary discovered by researcher Gene Tomko also corroborate his birthplace as Good Pine, Louisiana. He moved to Baton Rouge at the age of 13. Taught the rudiments of guitar playing by his father and older brother Layfield, Slim was playing in bars in Baton Rouge by the late 1940s. In the 1930s and early 1940s, Lightnin' Slim served time in Louisiana State Penitentiary (often known as 'Angola') for manslaughter.

His first recording was "Bad Luck" ("If it wasn't for bad luck, I wouldn't have no luck at all"), released by J. D. "Jay" Miller's Feature Records in 1954. Miller gave him the stage name "Lightnin' Slim". Slim then recorded for Excello Records for 12 years, starting in the mid-1950s, often collaborating with his brother-in-law Slim Harpo and with the harmonica player Lazy Lester.

Slim stopped performing the blues for a time and eventually worked in a foundry in Pontiac, Michigan, as a result of which his hands were constantly exposed to high temperatures. He was rediscovered by Fred Reif in 1970, in Pontiac, where he was living in a rented room at Slim Harpo's sister's house. Reif soon got him back performing again and a new recording contract with Excello, this time through Bud Howell, then the president of the company. His first engagement was a reunion concert in 1971 at the University of Chicago Folk Festival with Lazy Lester, whom Reif had brought from Baton Rouge in January of that year.

In the 1970s, Slim performed on tours in Europe, including the Montreux Jazz Festival in Switzerland, for which he was often accompanied by Moses "Whispering" Smith on harmonica. He last toured the UK in 1973, with the American Blues Legends package organised by Big Bear Records.

In July 1974, Slim died of stomach cancer in Detroit, Michigan, aged 61. He was interred at Oak Hill Cemetery in Pontiac, Michigan.

== Discography ==
=== Singles ===
Year of release	A-side	B-side	Record label
1954	"Bad Luck"	"Rock Me Mama"	Feature Records
1954	"New Orleans Bound"	"I Can't Live Happy"	Feature Records
1954	"Bugger Bugger Boy"	"Ethel Mae"	Feature Records
1955	"Bad Feeling Blues"	"Lightnin' Slim Boogie"	Ace Records
1955	"I Can't Be Successful"	"Lightnin' Blues"	Excello Records
1956	"Sugar Plum"	"Just Made Twenty-One"	Excello Records
1956	"Goin' Home"	"Wonderin' and Goin'"	Excello Records
1957	"Bad Luck and Trouble"	"Have Your Way"	Excello Records
1957	"Mean Ole Lonesome Train"	"I'm Grown"	Excello Records
1957	"I'm a Rollin' Stone"	"Love Me Mama"	Excello Records
1957	"Hoo-Doo Blues"	"It's Mighty Crazy"	Excello Records
1958	"My Starter Won't Work"	"Long Meanie Mama"	Excello Records
1959	"I'm Leavin' You Baby"	"Feelin' Awful Blue"	Excello Records
1959	"Sweet Little Woman"	"Lightnin's Troubles"	Excello Records
1959	"Rooster Blues"	"'G.I.' Slim"	Excello Records
1959	"Tom Cat Blues"	"Bed Bug Blues"	Excello Records
1960	"Too Close Blues"	"My Little Angel Chile"	Excello Records
1960	"Cool Down Baby"	"Nothin' but the Devil"	Excello Records
1961	"I Just Don't Know"	"Somebody's Knocking"	Excello Records
1961	"I'm Tired Waitin' Baby"	"Hello Mary Lee"	Excello Records
1962	"Mind Your Own Business"	"You're Old Enough to Understand"	Excello Records
1962	"I'm Warning You Baby"	"Winter Time Blues"	Excello Records
1963	"I'm Evil"	"If You Ever Need Me"	Excello Records
1963	"Loving Around the Clock"	"You Know You're So Fine"	Excello Records
1963	"Blues at Night"	"Don't Mistreat Me Baby"	Excello Records
1964	"The Strangest Feeling"	"You Give Me the Blues"	Excello Records
1964	"She's My Crazy Little Baby"	"Greyhound Blues"	Excello Records
1964	"Baby Please Come Back"	"You Move Me Baby"	Excello Records
1964	"Have Mercy on Me Baby"	"I've Been a Fool for You Darlin'"	Excello Records
1965	"Can't Live This Life No More"	"Bad Luck BLues"	Excello Records
1965	"Don't Start Me Talkin'"	"Darling, You're the One"	Excello Records
1965	"Love is Just a Gamble"	"I Hate to See You Leave"	Excello Records
1965	"Just a Lonely Stranger"	"Goin' Away Blues"	Excello Records
1972	"My Babe"	"Good Morning Heartaches"	Excello Records
1972	"Just a Little Bit"	"You're Old Enough to Understand" / "Mind Your Own Business"	Blue Horizon Records

=== Albums ===
- Rooster Blues, Excello LPS-8000 (1960); CD release: Hip-O/MCA 40134, with three bonus tracks (1998)
- Authentic R & B, three tracks, with various artists, Stateside SL-10068 (1963)
- The Real R & B, two tracks, with various artists, Stateside SL-10112 (1964)
- A Long Drink of Blues, six tracks (all of side one), compilation album with Slim Harpo, Stateside SL-10135 (1964)
- Lightnin' Slim's Bell Ringer, Excello LPS-8004 (1965); CD release: Ace Records #CDCHD-517 (1994)
- The Real Blues, one track, with various artists, Excello LPS-8011 (1969)
- High & Low Down, Excello LPS-8018 (1971) and Sonet SNTF-770 (1978); CD release: Ace Records #CDCHD-578 (1994)
- That's All Right, Quicksilver QS-5062 (1983), reissue of Excello LPS-8018
- London Gumbo, Excello LPS-8023 (1972) and Sonet SNTF-757 (1978)
- The Excello Story, three tracks, with various artists, Excello LPS-8025 (1972), Two-LP set
- Montreux Blues Festival, 10 tracks, with various artists, Excello LPS-8026 (1972), Two-LP set
- American Blues Legends '73, two tracks, with various artists, Big Bear Records BEAR20; Polydor 2460 186 (1973)
- The Early Years, Flyright FLYLP-524 (1976)
- Trip to Chicago, Flyright FLYLP-533 (1978)
- The Feature Sides 1954, Flyright FLYLP-583 (1981)
- We Gotta Rock Tonight, Flyright FLYLP-612 (1986)

=== CD compilations ===
- Rollin' Stone, Flyright FLYCD-08 (1989)
- King of the Swamp Blues 1954–1961, Flyright FLYCD-47 (1992)
- Blue Lightning, Indigo Records IGOCD-2002 (1992)
- I'm Evil: Rare & Unissued Excello Masters, Volume One, Excello/AVI 3002 (1994)
- It's Mighty Crazy!, Ace Records CDCHD-587 (1995)
- Nothin' but the Devil, Ace Records CDCHD-616 (1996)
- Winter Time Blues (The Later Excello Sessions 1962–1965), Ace Records CDCHD-674 (1998)
- The Best of Lightnin' Slim, Hip-O/MCA 12010 (1999)
- I'm a Rolling Stone: The Singles As & Bs 1954–1962 Centenary Edition, Jasmine JASMCD-3045 (2015), Two-CD set
