= Tabby Thomas =

American blues musician (1929–2014)

- Born: Ernest Joseph Thomas; January 5, 1929; Baton Rouge, Louisiana, U.S.
- Died: January 1, 2014 (aged 84) Baton Rouge, Louisiana, U.S.
- Genres: Blues, swamp blues
- Occupations: Musician, singer
- Instruments: Piano, guitar, vocals
- Years active: before 1960s–2013
- Labels: Excello Records, Blue Beat, Maison de Soul

Ernest Joseph "Tabby" Thomas (January 5, 1929 – January 1, 2014), also known as Rockin' Tabby Thomas, was an American blues musician. He sang and played the piano and guitar and specialized in swamp blues, a style of blues indigenous to southern Louisiana.

== Life and career ==
Thomas was born and grew up in Baton Rouge, Louisiana, United States. After graduating from high school he served in the U.S. Air Force, and while serving won a talent contest on KSAN radio in San Francisco in 1959. He made a few unsuccessful recordings for Hollywood Records and then he returned to Baton Rouge. He recorded for several small local labels, before he became more successful with Excello Records, based in Crowley, Louisiana; his records for Excello included "Hoodo Party" in 1961. He also worked in various jobs, including a time with Ciba Geigy, when he was a union steward.

He became one of the best-known blues musicians in Baton Rouge with his band, the Mellow, Mellow Men, but briefly retired from performing in the late 1960s to set up his own record label, Blue Beat, which released his recordings and those of other local musicians. In 1978, with other members of his family, including his son Chris Thomas King, he reopened a rundown building on North Boulevard. He ran the venue as an authentic blues club, Tabby's Blues Box and Heritage Hall. The club moved in 2000 and eventually closed in November 2004. Thomas also became a popular performer in the UK and Europe, where he made regular appearances.

In 1986, his single "Bad Luck and Trouble" backed with "I Can't Hold Out", released on the Maison de Soul record label, was nominated for a W.C. Handy Music Award in the Blues Single of the Year category.

Thomas had a serious automobile accident in 2002 and a stroke in 2004, which affected his playing but not his singing. He later hosted the radio show Tabby's Blues Box on the Baton Rouge stations WBRH-FM and KBRH-AM. He died in the early hours of January 1, 2014, and was interred at Port Hudson National Cemetery.
