= Louisiana blues =

Genre of blues music

- Stylistic origins: Blues; Dixieland; rhythm and blues; zydeco
- Cultural origins: 1940s–1950s, New Orleans and Baton Rouge, Louisiana, U.S.

Subgenres
- New Orleans blues; swamp blues

Other topics
- New Orleans rhythm and blues

Louisiana blues is a genre of blues music that developed in the period after World War II in the state of Louisiana. It is generally divided into two major subgenres, with the jazz-influenced New Orleans blues based on the musical traditions of that city and the slower tempo swamp blues incorporating influences from zydeco and Cajun music from around Baton Rouge.

Major artists in the New Orleans tradition include Professor Longhair and Guitar Slim and for swamp blues Slim Harpo and Lightnin' Slim. Both genres peaked in popularity in the 1960s; interest declined in the later 1960s, but there have been occasional revivals since the 1970s.

== New Orleans blues ==
The blues that developed in the 1940s and 1950s in and around the city of New Orleans was strongly influenced by jazz and incorporated Caribbean influences, it is dominated by piano and saxophone but has also produced major guitar bluesmen. Major figures in the genre include Professor Longhair and Guitar Slim, who both produced major regional, national R&B chart and even mainstream hits.

== Swamp blues ==
Swamp blues developed around Baton Rouge in the 1950s and which reached a peak of popularity in the 1960s. It generally has a slow tempo and incorporates influences from other genres of music, particularly the regional styles of zydeco and Cajun music. Its most successful proponents included Slim Harpo and Lightnin' Slim, who enjoyed a number of rhythm and blues and national hits and whose work was frequently covered by bands of the British Invasion.
