= J. D. "Jay" Miller =

American record producer (1922–1996)

J.D. "Jay" Miller
- Miller with a gold record awarded to Kitty Wells

Background information
- Born: Joseph Denton Miller; May 5, 1922; Iota, Louisiana, U.S.
- Died: March 23, 1996 (aged 73) Lafayette, Louisiana, U.S.
- Genres: Cajun, country, swamp blues, swamp pop
- Occupations: Record producer, songwriter, musician
- Years active: 1940s–1990s
- Labels: Fais Do Do Records, Feature Records

Joseph Denton "Jay" Miller (May 5, 1922 – March 23, 1996) was an American record producer and songwriter from Louisiana, whose Cajun, swamp blues, and swamp pop recordings influenced American popular culture.

== Biography ==
Miller was born in Iota, Louisiana, on May 5, 1922, and spent many childhood years in El Campo, Texas. He lived most of his life in Crowley, where in the late 1930s he played guitar with several Cajun bands, including the Four Aces, the Rice City Ramblers, and the Daylight Creepers. In 1946, he began to record Cajun musicians, using a studio belonging to the record producer Cosimo Matassa, in New Orleans. In 1946, his new label, Fais-Do-Do Records, recorded most notably the string band 'Happy, Doc & The Boys' (Leroy "Happy Fats" Leblanc and Oran "Doc" Guidry). After a few records, in 1947, he changed the name of the label to Feature Records, which recorded Cajun musicians such as Amidie Breaux, Aldus Roger, Austin Pete and various other country musicians. Later, Miller would create smaller labels and record for different genres of music: French "Hits", Zynn Records, Rocko Records, Kry Records, Swade Records, Rocket Records, Kajun Records, Action Records, Kay Records, Savior Records, Tribute Records, Spot Records, Ringo Records, Reb Rebel Records, Cajun Classics, Par T Records, Blues Unlimited Records, Soul Unlimited Records, and Showtime Records.

In the 1950s he began to record swamp pop artists, including King Karl, Guitar Gable, Warren Storm, Rod Bernard, and Johnnie Allan, among others. In 1952, Miller wrote the lyrics to "It Wasn't God Who Made Honky Tonk Angels" (an answer song to the recent Hank Thompson hit "The Wild Side of Life"). The song, as recorded by Kitty Wells, became gold and stayed number 1 for several weeks.

Around this time he also began to record swamp blues artists, such as Lightnin' Slim, Lazy Lester, Lonesome Sundown and Slim Harpo. Miller produced Harpo's "I'm a King Bee" and "Rainin' in My Heart", significant swamp blues recordings later covered, respectively, by the Rolling Stones and by Neil Young. From 1962 to 1965, Miller also recorded sides by Silas Hogan, until Miller argued with the new owners of Excello Records and his input to that label dried up.

Miller's recording studio attracted a handful of mainstream recording artists, including Paul Simon, who used the studio to record "That Was Your Mother", a track from his acclaimed album Graceland, and John Fogerty, who traveled to Crowley to record a cover of "My Toot Toot", by the zydeco musician Rockin' Sidney.

Miller's songwriting credits include "It Wasn't God Who Made Honky Tonk Angels".

Although he claimed to be a segregationist, Miller nonetheless used interracial studio bands during the Jim Crow era, when black and white musicians in the South were not permitted to mingle onstage or elsewhere in public. He professed to enjoy African-American blues music more than any other musical genre, and he wrote blues songs under the pseudonym "Jerry West" (a name he used to disguise his race). Yet in the 1960s he also produced and released several racist recordings on his own Reb Rebel label, most notably those of Johnny Rebel (the pseudonym of a local Cajun/country musician, Clifford "Pee Wee" Trahan).

Miller died in Crowley, on March 23, 1996, after complications following quadruple bypass surgery. The Jay D. Miller Award, granted by the Louisiana Blues Hall of Fame, is named for him.

Fais-Do-Do
- Genre: Cajun, country, swamp blues, swamp pop
- Country of origin: United States
- Location: Iota, Louisiana, United States

Feature
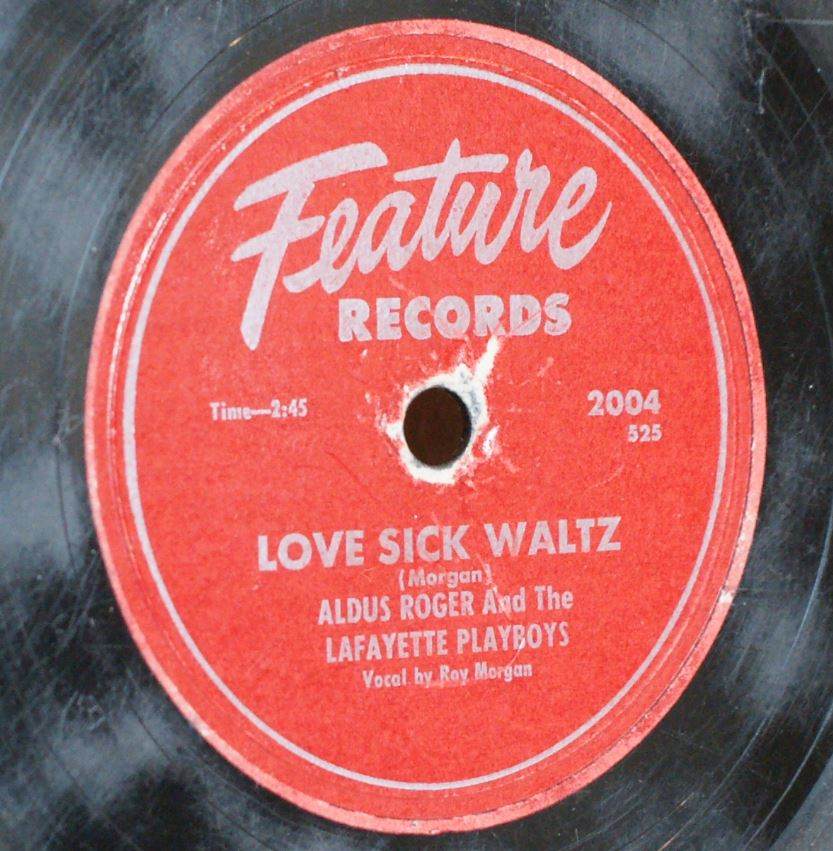
- Feature logo
- Genre: Cajun, country, swamp blues, swamp pop
- Country of origin: United States
- Location: Iota, Louisiana, United States

== Select recorded songs ==
Songs written by Miller, covered by other artists:

- "I Made A Big Mistake" – covered by Iry LeJeune.
- "Diggy Liggy Lo" – covered by Doug Kershaw, and many others.
- "I Hear You Knockin'" – covered by The Fabulous Thunderbirds, and Dwight Yoakam.
- "Sugar Coated Love" – covered by Freddy Fender, The Fabulous Thunderbirds, Roomful of Blues, Lou Ann Barton, and Johnny Winter.
- "Tell Me Pretty Baby" – covered by The Fabulous Thunderbirds.
- "You're Humbuggin' Me" – covered by The Fabulous Thunderbirds, and Darrell Nulisch.
- "Tag Along" – covered by The Juke Jumpers, and The Blasters.
- "Big Time Operator" – covered by The LeRoi Brothers, and The Dead Milkmen.
- "My Home Is A Prison" – covered by Ronnie Earl and the Broadcasters.
- "My Starter Won't Start"– covered by John Hammond, and Hank Williams, Jr.
- "Rooster Blues" – covered by Delbert McClinton, and Sleepy LaBeef.
- "Nothin' But The Devil" – covered by Rory Gallagher.
- "Rainin' In My Heart" – covered by Hank Williams, Jr., and Neil Young and the Shocking Pinks.
- "Blues Hang-Over" – covered by George Thorogood and the Destroyers.
- "I Would Be A Sinner" – covered by Roomful of Blues.
- "This Should Go On Forever" – covered by Anson Funderburgh and the Rockets.
- "Hoodoo Party" – covered by Anson Funderburgh and the Rockets.
- "Wild Cherry" – covered by Anson Funderburgh and the Rockets.
- "Blues Stop Knockin'" – covered by Mark Hummel.
- "Learn To Treat Me Better" – covered by Denny Freeman and the Cobras.
- "Don't Start Crying Now" – covered by Them featuring Van Morrison.
- "I'm A Lover, Not A Fighter" – covered by The Kinks, and Dave Edmunds.

== Compilation discography ==
- Acadian All Star Special: The Pioneering Cajun Recordings of J.D. Miller (Bear Family BCD 17206-1/2/3 CK, 2011)

== Sources ==
- John Broven, South to Louisiana: The Music of the Cajun Bayous (Gretna, La.: Pelican, 1983).
