= Lazy Lester =

American blues harmonica player (1933–2018)

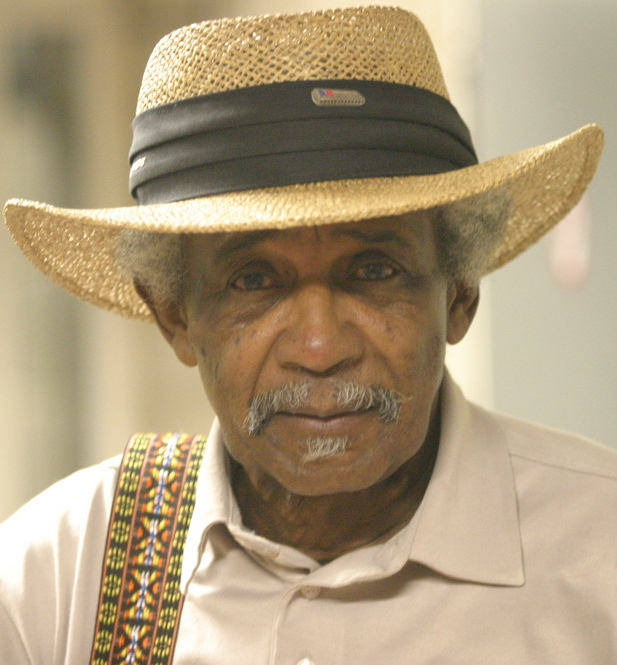
- Lester in 2004

Background information
- Born: Leslie Johnson; June 20, 1933; Torras, Louisiana, U.S.
- Died: August 22, 2018 (aged 85) Paradise, California, U.S.
- Genres: Swamp blues; Louisiana blues
- Occupation: Musician
- Instruments: Harmonica; vocals; guitar
- Years active: 1950s–2018
- Labels: Excello; Alligator; Ace

Leslie Johnson (June 20, 1933 – August 22, 2018), known as Lazy Lester, was an American blues musician who sang and played the harmonica and guitar. In a career spanning the 1950s to 2018, he pioneered swamp blues, and also played harmonica blues, rhythm and blues and Louisiana blues.

Best known for regional hits recorded with Ernie Young's Nashville-based Excello Records, Lester also contributed to songs recorded by other Excello artists, including Slim Harpo, Lightnin' Slim, and Katie Webster. Cover versions of his songs have been recorded by (among others) the Kinks, the Flamin' Groovies, Freddy Fender, Dwight Yoakam, Dave Edmunds, Raful Neal, Anson Funderburgh, and the Fabulous Thunderbirds. In the comeback stage of his career (since the late 1980s), he recorded new albums backed by Mike Buck, Sue Foley, Gene Taylor, Kenny Neal, Lucky Peterson, and Jimmie Vaughan.

== Biography ==
Leslie Johnson started playing the guitar around age 11 and began performing in his teens around Baton Rouge with Raful Neal, later co-founding the Rhythm Rockers. In the mid-1950s, Lester was on the margins of the Louisiana blues scene. According to Rolling Stone (February 2006), Buddy Guy, before moving to Chicago, had played in Louisiana with some of the old masters: Lightnin' Hopkins, Lazy Lester, and Slim Harpo. When Guy left for Chicago, in 1957, Lester replaced him, on guitar, in a local band – even though Lester, at that time, did not own such an instrument.

Lester's career took off when he found a seat next to Lightnin' Slim on a bus transporting Slim to an Excello recording session. At the studio, the scheduled harmonica player did not appear. Slim and Lester spent the afternoon unsuccessfully trying to find him, when Lester volunteered that he could play the harmonica. Lester's work on that first Lightnin' Slim session led the producer, Jay Miller, to record Lester as solo artist and also to use him as a multi-instrumentalist on percussion, guitar, bass, and harmonica in sessions headlined by other artists whose recordings were produced by Miller, including, notably, Slim Harpo. 'Percussion' on these sessions went beyond the traditional drum kit and included a rolled-up newspaper striking a cardboard box. Miller dubbed Lester "Lazy Lester" because of his laconic, laid-back style.

More than his vocal delivery, Lester is best remembered for songs that were later covered by a wide range of rock, country, blues, and Tex-Mex stars, chiefly, "I'm a Lover Not a Fighter," "I Hear You Knockin'," and "Sugar Coated Love".

Lester stated that he wrote these songs, but almost all are credited to Miller or to Lester and Miller. Lester also stated he received few royalties, which embittered him and made him skeptical of the music industry. By the late 1960s, he had given up on the music industry, working manual labor and pursuing his favorite hobby – fishing. Lester eventually moved to Pontiac, Michigan, living with Slim Harpo's sister.

In 1971, Fred Reif set up a Lightnin' Slim concert at the University of Chicago Folk Festival, and Lester was brought up from Louisiana to accompany him. A few weeks after that performance, Lester was back in Louisiana. Years later, Reif and Lester were both in Michigan, from where Reif orchestrated a comeback. Lester recorded and played around the United States and abroad, backed by blues bands, including, frequently, Loaded Dice.

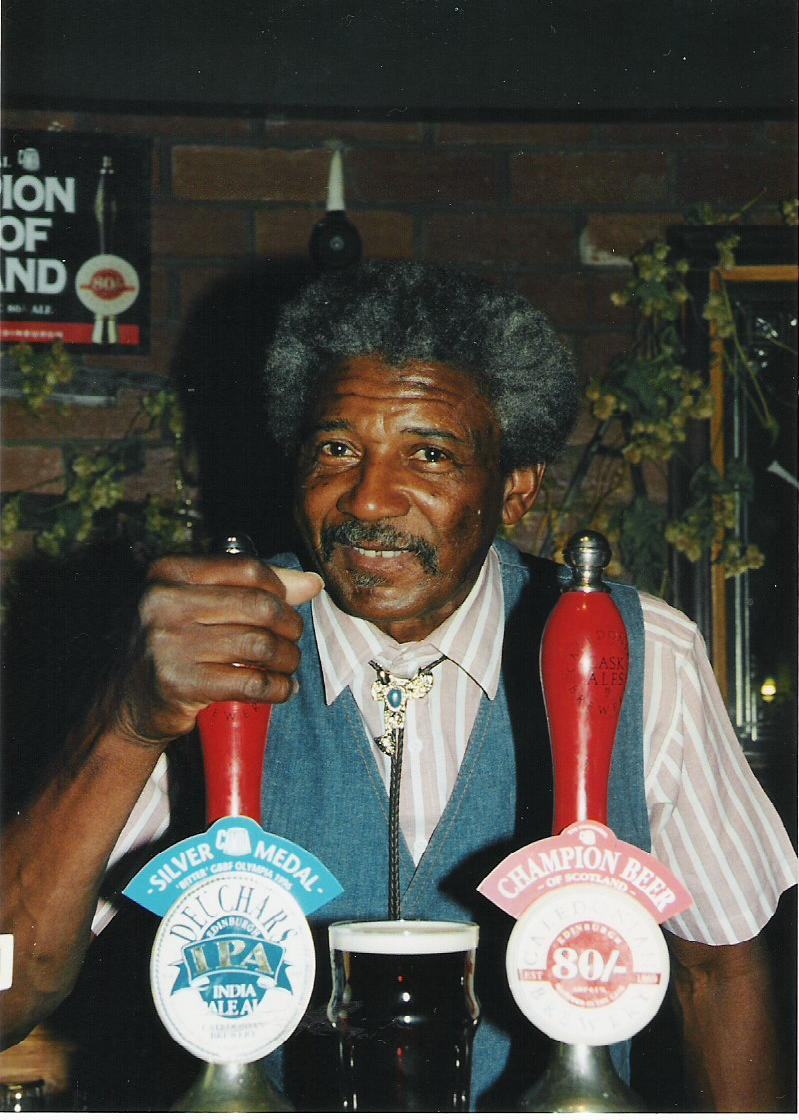
Lester in 1997

Lester's recordings in this period were on blues labels Alligator and Telarc, alongside releases in Europe (primarily on the British label, Flyright Records).

In September 2002, he was presented with a Lifetime Achievement Award by the Boston Blues Society.

In 2003, Martin Scorsese included Lester in his blues tribute concert at Radio City Music Hall, a record of which was released as the film and album Lightning in A Bottle. The group photograph inside the album depicted Lester grinning, dead-center among peers and musical progeny including B.B. King, Solomon Burke, Clarence "Gatemouth" Brown, Buddy Guy, Levon Helm, Chuck D, the Neville Brothers, Dr. John, John Fogerty, and Aerosmith.

Lester lived in Paradise, California, with his girlfriend, and appeared in the 2015 documentary film I Am the Blues.

Lester continued to perform nationally and abroad into 2018, often returning to Louisiana where he regularly shared the stage with Lil' Buck Sinegal, Carol Fran, and Kenny Neal. In the same year, he appeared and performed in a television commercial aired nationally for Geico Insurance.

Lester died of cancer on August 22, 2018, at the age of 85.

== Selected discography ==
- True Blues – 1967, Excello
- Lazy Lester Rides Again – 1987, King Snake
- Harp & Soul – 1988, Alligator (featuring Lucky Peterson, Kenny Neal)
- Lazy Lester – 1989, Flyright (previously unreleased Excello session takes from the 1960's)
- I'm a Lover Not a Fighter – 1994, Ace Records
- I Hear You Knockin': Best of the Excello Singles – 1994, Excello/AVI Records
- All Over You – 1998, Antone's (recorded 1997; featuring Derek O'Brien, Sue Foley, Sarah Brown, Mike Buck)
- Lazy Lester – 2000, APO (6-song audiophile 12" EP; recorded October 12–13; featuring Henry Gray, Jimmy D. Lane)
- Superharps II – 2001, Telarc (co-billed with Carey Bell, Raful Neal, Snooky Pryor)
- Blues Stop Knockin' – 2001, Antone's (featuring Jimmie Vaughan)
- Blues On My Radio – 2004, SWMAF (featuring Louisiana Red)
- Blues Harp Meltdown Vol. 3: Legends – 2004 (co-billed with Mark Hummel, Carey Bell, Cephas & Wiggins) (Mountain Top Records)
- Family Meeting – 2008, Ruf – double album by Wentus Blues Band
- One More Once – 2010, Karonte/Cambaya (produced by Mike Vernon)
- You Better Listen – 2011, Bluestown (recorded in Notodden, Norway)
- "New Orleans" – 2011, (featuring Maurice 'Big Mo' Huffman) on Huffman's album Torn

== See also ==
- Blues harp
- List of harmonica blues musicians
- List of harmonicists
- List of swamp blues musicians
- Music of Louisiana
- San Francisco Blues Festival
- The Southern Legends Entertainment & Performing Arts Hall of Fame
