= Swamp blues =

Music genre; form of Louisiana blues

- Stylistic origins: Blues; Cajun music; Creole music; country blues; Louisiana blues; zydeco
- Cultural origins: 1950s, Louisiana, U.S.
- Derivative forms: Swamp pop; swamp rock

Swamp blues is a type of Louisiana blues that developed in the Black communities of Southwest Louisiana in the 1950s. It incorporates influences from other genres, particularly zydeco and Cajun. Its most successful proponents include Slim Harpo and Lightnin' Slim, who enjoyed national rhythm and blues hits.

== Characteristics ==
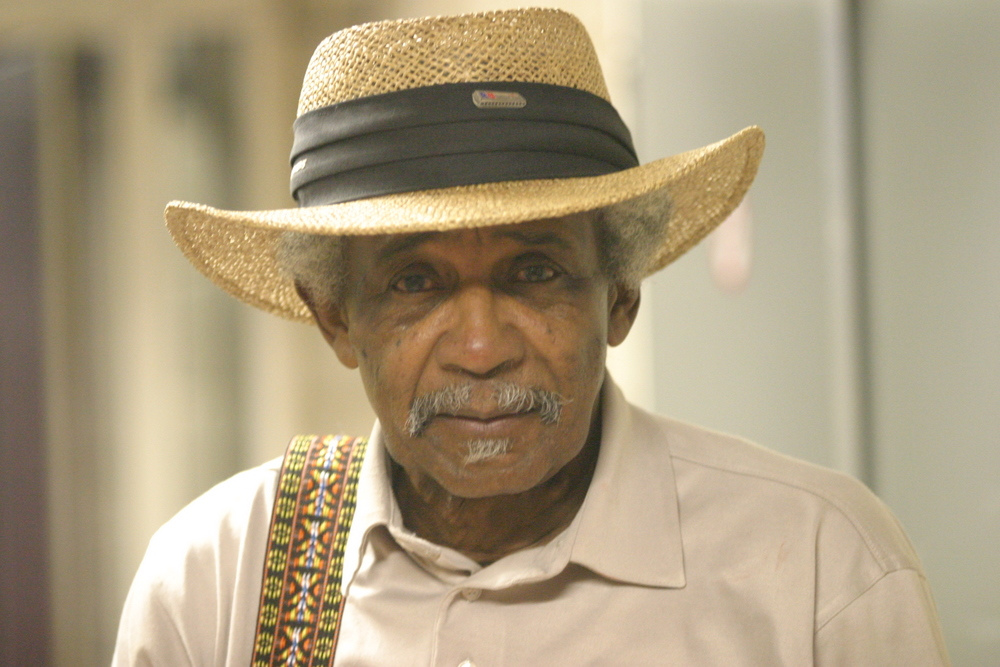
Lazy Lester in 2004

Swamp blues has a laid-back, slow tempo, and generally is a more rhythmic variation of Louisiana blues, incorporating influences from New Orleans blues, zydeco, soul music and Cajun music. It is characterized by simple but effective guitar work and is influenced by the boogie patterns used on Jimmy Reed records and the work of Lightnin' Hopkins and Muddy Waters. The sound of swamp blues was characterized by "eerie echo, shuffle beats, tremolo guitars, searing harmonica and sparse percussion".

== History ==
Swamp blues originated in the Black communities of Southwest Louisiana in the 1950s and was particularly associated with record producer J. D. "Jay" Miller. In the 1950s, Miller recorded many blues artists around the city, distributing their recordings through Excello Records in Nashville, Tennessee. The most successful and influential artist with whom he worked was guitarist and harmonica player Slim Harpo. Other major artists included Lightnin' Slim, Lazy Lester, Silas Hogan, Lonesome Sundown, and piano player Katie Webster. A number of their songs, particularly those of Slim Harpo, were covered by British Invasion bands, including the Rolling Stones, The Kinks and the Yardbirds. The popularity of the genre faded in the 1970s, with many swamp bluesmen turning to zydeco which remained popular with black audiences.
