= Slim Harpo =

American blues guitar and harmonica player (1924–1970)

Background information
- Born: Isiah Moore or James Isaac Moore; February 11, 1924; Lobdell, Louisiana, U.S.
- Died: January 31, 1970 (aged 45) Baton Rouge, Louisiana, U.S.
- Genres: Blues; swamp blues
- Occupation: Musician
- Instruments: Harmonica; guitar; vocals
- Years active: c. 1950–1970
- Labels: Excello; Stateside

Slim Harpo (born either Isiah Moore or James Isaac Moore; February 11, 1924 (Note: Researcher Martin Hawkins has stated, based on his birth certificate (as Isiah [sic] Moore) and an affidavit from his sister, that Harpo was born on February 11, 1924, as stated on his gravestone. However, other published sources state that he was born on January 11, 1924.) – January 31, 1970) was an American blues musician, a leading exponent of the swamp blues style, and "one of the most commercially successful blues artists of his day". He played guitar and was a master of the blues harmonica, known in blues circles as a "harp". His most successful and influential recordings included "I'm a King Bee" (1957), "Rainin' in My Heart" (1961), and "Baby Scratch My Back" (1966), which reached number one on Billboard's R&B chart and number 16 on its broader Hot 100 singles chart.

== Life and career ==
Moore was born in Lobdell, Louisiana, the eldest child in his family. After his parents died he worked as a longshoreman and construction worker in New Orleans in the late 1930s and early 1940s. Influenced in style by Jimmy Reed, he began performing in Baton Rouge bars using the name "Harmonica Slim", and also accompanied his brother-in-law Lightnin' Slim in live performances.

He started his recording career in March 1957, working with the A&R man and record producer J. D. "Jay" Miller in Crowley, Louisiana. To differentiate himself from another performer called Harmonica Slim he took his wife's suggestion and adopted the name Slim Harpo. His first solo release, for Excello Records, based in Nashville, Tennessee, was "I'm a King Bee", backed with "I Got Love If You Want It" in 1957. Harpo played guitar in his live shows, but he usually used other guitarists when recording. The record was a regional hit, but failed to make the national charts. He followed up with several more singles for Excello before having his first chart hit, "Rainin' in My Heart", in early 1961. The record reached number 17 on Billboard's R&B chart and number 34 on its Hot 100, and it was followed soon after with an album of the same name and additional singles. Many of his songs were co-written with his wife, Lovelle Moore, although she never received credit.

Never a full-time musician, Harpo owned a trucking business during the 1960s. According to writer Ryan Whirty, "Harpo and his band needed to tour constantly and play as much as possible; times were frequently lean financially, and the men had to scrape up whatever they could get." But, by 1964, several of his songs had been released on albums and singles in the UK, and British rock bands began to include versions of his songs in their early repertoires. British Merseybeat/R&B group The Moody Blues reportedly took their name from an instrumental track of Slim's called "Moody Blues". Critic Cub Koda wrote of his appeal:

Harpo was more adaptable than [Jimmy] Reed or most other bluesmen. His material not only made the national charts, but also proved to be quite adaptable for white artists on both sides of the Atlantic ... A people-pleasing club entertainer, he certainly wasn't above working rock & roll rhythms into his music, along with hard-stressed, country & western vocal inflections ... By the time his first single became a Southern jukebox favorite, his songs were being adapted and played by white musicians left and right. Here was good-time Saturday-night blues that could be sung by elements of the Caucasian persuasion with a straight face.

He had his biggest commercial success in 1966, when the predominantly instrumental "Baby Scratch My Back" reached number one on the R&B chart and number 16 on the broader chart. Harpo described it as "an attempt at rock & roll for me" and was again produced by Miller. However, disagreements with Miller and a change in the record company's ownership led to two follow-ups, "Tip On In" and "Tee-Ni-Nee-Ni-Nu", being recorded in Nashville with new producer Robert Holmes. Both made the R&B chart.

He recruited Lightnin' Slim for his touring band in 1968, and toured widely in the late 1960s, mainly reaching rock audiences. With his first scheduled tour of Europe and recording sessions already planned, "one of the cleanest living bluesmen of his era" (Note: According to Louisiana music historian John Broven, his death was due to complications from a punctured lung. Notes to Slim Harpo, The Excello Singles Anthology. Hip-O/Universal Music Enterprises, 2003.) died suddenly of a heart attack in Baton Rouge. He was buried in Mulatto Bend Cemetery in Port Allen, Louisiana.

== Influence ==
Music critic Cub Koda noted that his songs "also proved to be quite adaptable for white artists on both sides of the Atlantic, including the Rolling Stones, Yardbirds, Kinks, Dave Edmunds with Love Sculpture, Van Morrison with Them, Sun rockabilly singer Warren Smith, Hank Williams, Jr., and the Fabulous Thunderbirds". The Slim Harpo Music Awards, awarded annually in Baton Rouge, are named in his honor. Proceeds from the awards benefit the "Music in the Schools" outreach program.

A biography, titled Slim Harpo: Blues King Bee of Baton Rouge, by UK blues scholar Martin Hawkins was published in 2006. David Fricke of Rolling Stone magazine described the book as "a passionate, encyclopedic triumph, bringing the enigmatic Harpo to life and tracing his remarkable mainstream ascension – from the rich central-Louisiana blues scene to gigs at the Fillmore East – with deep local research and detailed portraits of the singer's peers, sidemen and record-business associates."

== Discography ==
=== Singles ===
- 1957 - "I'm a King Bee" / "I Got Love if You Want It" (Excello 2113)
- 1958 - "Wondering and Worryin'" / "Strange Love" (Excello 2138)
- 1959 - "You'll Be Sorry One Day" / "One More Day" (Excello 2162)
- 1960 - "Buzz Me Babe" / "Late Last Night" (Excello 2171)
- 1960 - "Blues Hang-Over" / "What a Dream" (Excello 2184)
- 1961 - "Rainin' in My Heart" / "Don't Start Cryin' Now" (Excello 2194) - R&B chart number 17, US pop chart number 34
- 1963 - "I Love the Life I'm Living" / "Buzzin'" (Excello 2239)
- 1964 - "I Need Money (Keep Your Alibis)" / "My Little Queen Bee (Got a Brand New King)" (Excello 2246)
- 1964 - "Still Rainin' in My Heart" / "We're Two of a Kind" (Excello 2253)
- 1964 - "Sittin' Here Wondering" / "What's Goin' on Baby" (Excello 2261)
- 1965 - "Harpo's Blues" / "Please Don't Turn Me Down" (Excello 2265)
- 1966 - "Baby Scratch My Back" / "I'm Gonna Miss You (Like The Devil)" (Excello 2273) - R&B chart number 1, US pop chart number 16
- 1966 - "Shake Your Hips" / "Midnight Blues" (Excello 2278)
- 1966 - "I'm Your Bread Maker, Baby" / "Loving You (The Way I Do)" (Excello 2282)
- 1967 - "Tip On In (Part 1)" / "Tip On In (Part 2)" (Excello 2285) - R&B chart number 37
- 1967 - "I'm Gonna Keep What I've Got" / "I've Got To Be With You Tonight" (Excello 2289)
- 1968 - "Te-Ni-Nee-Ni-Nu" / "Mailbox Blues" (Excello 2294) - R&B chart number 36
- 1968 - "Mohair Sam" / "I Just Can't Leave You" (Excello 2301)
- 1969 - "That's Why I Love You" / "Just For You" (Excello 2305)
- 1969 - "Folsom Prison Blues" / "Mutual Friend" (Excello 2306)
- 1969 - "I've Got My Finger on Your Trigger" / "The Price Is Too High" (Excello 2309)
- 1970 - "Rainin' in My Heart" (reissue w/over-dubs) / "Jody Man" (Excello 2316)

=== Albums ===
- 1960 - Tunes to Be Remembered (one track; various artists - Excello LPS-8001)
- 1961 - Rainin' in My Heart (Excello LPS-8003) (CD release: Hip-O/MCA 40135, 1998 - with three bonus tracks)
- 1963 - Authentic R & B (three tracks; various artists - Stateside SL-10068)
- 1964 - The Real R & B (three tracks; various artists - Stateside SL-10112)
- 1964 - A Long Drink of Blues (six tracks...all of side 2; compilation album shared with Lightnin' Slim - Stateside SL-10135)
- 1966 - Baby Scratch My Back (Excello LPS-8005)
- 1968 - Tip On In (Excello LPS-8008)
- 1968 - Saturday Night Function: Rural Blues, Vol. 2 (two tracks; various artists - Imperial LM-94001)
- 1969 - The Best of Slim Harpo (compilation album - Excello LPS-8010)
- 1969 - The Real Blues (one track; various artists - Excello LPS-8011)
- 1970 - Slim Harpo Knew the Blues (Excello LPS-8013)
- 1970 - He Knew the Blues (Blue Horizon 7-63854; UK version of Excello LPS-8013 with two extra tracks: "Shake Your Hips" and "I'm Your Bread Maker Baby")
- 1971 - Trigger Finger (Blue Horizon/Polydor 2431 013)
- 1972 - The Excello Story (three tracks; various artists - Excello LPS-8025) 2LP
- 1976 - Slim Harpo...Knew the Blues (Vol. 2) (Excello/Nashboro 28030) 2LP/25 tracks compilation of LPS-8008, LPS-8013, and four singles: Excello 2301, 2305, 2306, 2309; plus one previously unreleased track: "Stick Your Chest Out Baby".
- 1978 - Slim Harpo...He Knew the Blues (Sonet SNTF-769) single LP/14 tracks sampler of Excello 28030.

=== Compilation albums ===
- 1989 - I'm a King Bee (Flyright FLYCD-05)
- 1989 - The Best of Slim Harpo (The Original King Bee) (Rhino R2-70169)
- 1993 - The Best of Slim Harpo (Ace Records CDCHM-410)
- 1994 - I'm a King Bee (The Early Swamp Blues Classics) (Ace CDCHD-510)
- 1995 - Hip Shakin': The Excello Collection (Excello/AVI 2001) 2CD
- 1995 - Shake Your Hips (Ace CDCHD-558) includes the four songs Harpo recorded for Imperial in 1968
- 1996 - Tip On In (Ace CDCHD-606)
- 1996 - The Scratch: Rare and Unissued, Volume 1 (Excello/AVI 3015)
- 1997 - Sting It Then! (Ace CDCHD-658) note: live recording from 1961
- 1997 - The Best of Slim Harpo (Hip-O/MCA 40072)
- 2003 - The Excello Singles Anthology (Hip-O/UMe B0000583 02) 2CD
- 2011 - Slim Harpo Rocks (Bear Family BCD-17129)
- 2015 - Buzzin' the Blues: The Complete Slim Harpo (Bear Family BCD-17339) 5-CD box set
- 2015 - I'm A King Bee 1957-1961 (Jasmine JASMCD-3047)
- 2015 - Buzz Me Babe: Excello Sides 1957-1962 (Soul Jam 600866)
