= Excello Records =

American record label

Excello Records was an American blues independent record label, started by Ernie Young in Nashville, Tennessee, United States, in 1953 as a subsidiary of Nashboro, a gospel label.

== History ==
It recorded such artists as Louis Brooks, Lightnin' Slim, Slim Harpo, Roscoe Shelton, Lazy Lester, the Kelly Brothers, Lonesome Sundown, Silas Hogan, Arthur Gunter, Marion James, Carol Fran, Warren Storm, Tabby Thomas, Guitar Gable, and a spoken word sermon by Martin Luther King Jr.

Arthur Gunter recorded an answer song to Eddy Arnold's country and western song, "I Wanna Play House With You". His song, "Baby Let's Play House", was covered by Elvis Presley. By 1966, the label's owner Ernie Young was old and infirm, so he sold the business and retired.

In 2018, a 170-page book written by Randy Fox, Shake Your Hips: The Excello Records Story was released, out-lining the entire history of the label. ISBN 978-1-947026-22-3

== See also ==
- List of record labels
- Sound Stage 7
- Dial Records
- Nashboro Records
- Stax Records
- Hi Records
- Goldwax Records
- Fame Studios
