= Captain Gumbo =

Dutch zydeco and Cajun music band

- Origin: Netherlands
- Genres: Zydeco and Cajun music
- Years active: 1987 – at least 2013
- Label: MW Records
- Members: Gerard de Braconier; Jan de Ligt; Mark Söhngen; Jan van den Berg; Joost Witte
- Website: www.captaingumbo.nl

Captain Gumbo is a Dutch band formed in 1987, which plays mostly zydeco and Cajun music; that is, music in the French traditions of the U.S. state of Louisiana, based around the diatonic accordion. In 1990, their version of "Allons à Lafayette" (a song first recorded in 1928 by Joe Falcon and Cléoma Breaux) reached No. 30 in the Dutch singles chart. The band was still active as of 2013.

== History ==
Captain Gumbo was formed by Mark Söhngen (diatonic accordion and vocals), Hans Soeteman (bassist in the band RoToR), Joost Witte (drummer) and Gerard de Braconier (guitarist) (two members of the band Toontje Lager). Soeteman was soon replaced by Leon Giesen (who later became known as a filmmaker); who was later replaced by Nico Heilijgers; who was himself later replaced by Jan van den Berg. Keyboard player Roel Spanjers (of the band Normaal) has often played with the band, as has saxophonist Jan de Ligt.

Gumbo is a type of stew from Louisiana. It is the official cuisine of that state, which is also the heartland of zydeco and Cajun music. In 1980, Queen Ida released the album Queen Ida and the Bon Temps Zydeco Band in New Orleans. It includes a song called "Capitaine Gumbo", co-written by her and her brother Al Lewis (AKA Al Rapone). Captain Gumbo covered the song: it is the second track on their first album, 1 More 2 Step. That suggests a possible origin for the band's name.

In 1990, Captain Gumbo released their first CD, 1 More 2 Step. The opening track is their version of the song "Allons à Lafayette", first recorded in 1928 by Joe Falcon and Cléoma Breaux. It was released as a single, and in 1991 it peaked at No. 30 in the official Dutch music singles chart. On the back of that success, the band toured Louisiana, performing at Breaux Bridge, Baton Rouge and New Orleans, meeting their musical heroes such as D. L. Menard, Eddie LeJeune, Rockin' Dopsie, Marc Savoy, Boozoo Chavis, Chubby Carrier, Walter Mouton and Harry LaFleur, and supporting Steve Riley and the Mamou Playboys.

Neither 1 More 2 Step nor the band's next album Back à la maison (1992) (whose liner notes included an approving endorsement by record producer Floyd Soileau, who is Cajun) was a commercial success. Their third album, Chank-a-Chank (1994), peaked in the official Dutch album chart at #79. Their more recent releases have been commercially unsuccessful.

The band toured widely in the Netherlands, playing both large and small venues, and supported Fats Domino at a concert in Rotterdam Ahoy. They also performed in Belgium, Germany and Switzerland. Since 2001, their live appearances have been less frequent.

== Discography ==
- 1990 – 1 More 2 Step, MW Records MWCD/MWMC 2001
  - 1991 – "Allons à Lafayette"
- 18 November 1992 – Back à la maison, MW Records MWCD 2006
- 1 March 1994 – Chank-a-Chank, MW Records MWCD 2012
- 5 May 1997 – Midlife Two-Step, MW Records
- 6 July 2001 – Gumbo No. 5
- 2013 – Vive le Capitain (live album, recorded at Café XL in Wageningen), MW Records MW 2032

== Personnel ==
Band members have included:

=== As of 2013 ===
- Gerard de Braconier, guitar and backing vocals, from 1987, formerly in the band Toontje Lager
- Jan de Ligt, saxophonist, from c. 2001
- Mark Söhngen, diatonic accordion and vocals, from 1987, formerly in the duo Kruis & Mol
- Jan van den Berg, bass guitar and backing vocals, from c. 1994
- Joost Witte, drummer and vocals, from 1987, formerly in the band Toontje Lager

=== Formerly ===
- Leon Giesen, bass guitar, c. 1990 - c. 1994
- Nico Heilijgers, bass guitar, c. 1994
- Hans Soeteman, bass guitar, 1987 - c. 1990, formerly in the band RoToR
- Roel Spanjers, keyboards, c. 1994 - unknown date, of the band Normaal
- Rens van der Zalm, violinist, guest artist on Back à la maison (1992)

== Cover versions by Captain Gumbo ==
Many of the numbers performed by Captain Gumbo are their own interpretations (i.e. cover versions) of earlier recordings. One writer claims to have identified more than 70 of them. Such interpretations include:

- "Allons à Lafayette" – Joe Falcon and Cléoma Breaux (1928) – 1 More 2 Step, Vive le Capitain
- "Bayou Pon Pon" – Jimmie Davis and Hank Williams (1951) – 1 More 2 Step
- "Bosco Stomp" – Lawrence Walker (1951) – 1 More 2 Step
- "Capitaine Gumbo" – Queen Ida, on the album Queen Ida and the Bon Temps Zydeco Band in New Orleans (1980) – 1 More 2 Step
- "Diggy Liggy Ly" – Rusty and Doug (1961) – Chank-a-Chank
- "Do Re Mi" – Woody Guthrie (1956) – Chank-a-Chank
- "Down Yonder" – (instrumental) Gid Tanner (1931), (with lyrics) unidentified – Midlife Two-Step
- "Et La Bas" – The Creole Stompers (1944) – Midlife Two-Step, Vive le Capitain
- "Flemmes d'enfer" (original title, "Les flammes d'enfer) – Austin Pitre & The Evangeline Playboys (1979) – Vive le Capitain
- "J'étais aul bal" – The Balfa Brothers (before 1974) – 1 More 2 Step, Vive le Capitain
- "Jole Blonde" – Breaux Brothers (1929) – 1 More 2 Step, Vive le Capitain
- "Jolie Catin" – Boozoo Chavis (1989) – Midlife Two-Step
- "La danse à limonade" (original title, "La danse de la limonade") – Garolou (1980), on the album Romancero – Midlife Two-Step
- "Mamou Two Step" – Lawrence Walker (1951) – 1 More 2 Step
- "Maybellene" – Chuck Berry (1955) – Vive le Capitain
- "Parlez-nous à boire" – The Balfa Brothers (1981) – 1 More 2 Step
- "P'tit galop pour la pointe aux pins" – Adam Hebert (before 2002) – Back à la maison
- "Sugar Bee" – Cleveland Crochet (1960) (covered by Canned Heat on Future Blues (1970)) – Vive le Capitain
- "Sweet Liza Jane" – Trad. – Midlife Two-Step
- "Toot Toot" – Rockin' Sidney (1984) – 1 More 2 Step, Vive le Capitain
- "Walk of Life" – Dire Straits – Back à la maison, Vive le Capitain
- "Walkin' to New Orleans – Fats Domino (1960) – Chank-a-Chank
- "Wooly Booly" – Sam the Sham and the Pharaohs (1965) – Chank-a-Chank
