= Boozoo =

Boozoo may refer to:

- Boozoo Chavis (1930-2001), American zydeco musician
- Boozoo Bajou, German musical duo
- Boozoo Chavis (album), 1991 album by musician Boozoo Chavis

== See also ==
- Bozo
