= Japanese Girl (disambiguation) =

"Japanese Girl" is a 2005 song by Hitomi.

Japanese Girl may also refer to:

- The Japanese Girl, a 1971 collection of short stories by Winston Graham
- Japanese Girl, a 1976 album by Akiko Yano
- "Japanese Girl", a 1963 single by Lloyd Clarke
- "Japanese Girl", a 1985 single by Max-Him
- "Japanese Girl", a 1989 single by Akiko Ikuina
