= Fool's Day (disambiguation) =

Fool's Day is an annual custom on 1 April consisting of practical jokes and hoaxes.

Fool's Day may also refer to:

- "Fool's Day" (song), a song by English rock band Blur
- "Fool's Day", a song by Lloyd Clarke

== See also ==
- April Fool's Day (disambiguation)
