= Call the Police =

Call the Police may refer to:

== Radio program ==
- Call the Police (radio program), an old-time radio crime drama

== Songs ==
- "Call the Police" (G Girls song)
- "Call the Police" (LCD Soundsystem song)
- "Call the Police", a song by Ivi Adamou
- "Call the Police", a song by James Morrison from Undiscovered
- "Call the Police", a song by Thin Lizzy from Shades of a Blue Orphanage
- "Call the Police", a song by Twista from The Perfect Storm
- "Call the Police", a Nat King Cole song from season 3 of Theme Time Radio Hour
