= Straight Street (disambiguation) =

Straight Street is an ancient Roman road, in Damascus, Syria, referred to in the Bible.

Straight Street may also refer to:

- Straight Street (album), a 1989 album by pianist Harold Mabern
- "Straight Street", a 1955 song by The Pilgrim Travelers played on Theme Time Radio Hour in 2008
- "Straight Street", a song by John Coltrane on his 1957 album Coltrane
- "Straight Street", a song on the 2004 album Blueberry Boat by The Fiery Furnaces
- "Straight Street", a song on Ry Cooder’s 2018 album The Prodigal Son

== See also ==
- Straight Street Bridge, a historic bridge over the Passaic River in Paterson, New Jersey, US
- The Straight Road, a 1914 American drama silent film
