= Theme Time Radio Hour season 2 =

Radio show season

The second season of the Theme Time Radio Hour began on September 19, 2007, and ended April 2, 2008.

== Overview ==
=== The missing shows of Season 2 ===
In early September 2007, XM Radio announced the return of TTRH, beginning September 19. The press release read in part..."Future shows will center on such motifs as "Young & Old", "California", "Dreams", "Fruit," "Something", "Nothing", "Streets", "Parties" and "Mail..." The highlighted shows were not aired during Season 2.

=== Caller on Line 2 ===
The theme of the first episode of Season 2 was "Hello." As in Season 1, Ellen Barkin opened the show, announcing the "Hello" episode with the lines: "It's night time in the big city. Something isn't quite right. Nobody will answer the phone."

The show followed the same general format as Season 1, and introduced a new segment that would continue intermittently through the season, the "Caller on Line 2" (occasionally on "Line 3" and "Line 6"). This was a comedy segment featuring a listener call, supposedly as Dylan broadcast the show live from "Studio B." In this first call, a "Rob Harrison" requested that Dylan play The Doors' "Hello, I Love You." Dylan politely demurred.

=== Battle of the TTRH CDs ===
In early October 2007, ISIS magazine and UK-based oldies label Chrome Dreams announced its release of The Best of Bob Dylan's Theme Time Radio Hour, an unauthorized 2-CD compilation featuring selections - out of copyright in the EU - from the TTRH Season 1 playlist. The UK label Ace Records, released its own TTRH 2-CD compilation, Theme Time Radio Hour with Your Host, Bob Dylan, in March 2008, publicizing its set as "authorized", and compiled by TTRH producer, Eddie Gorodetsky and Dylan factotum, Jeff Rosen. In the summer of 2008, ISIS magazine released The Best of Bob Dylan's Theme Time Radio Hour: Volume 2. As with the first compilation, Volume 2 is a 2-CD set containing 52 selections from Season One of TTRH. The Ace set features a broader - and a better representative - mix of music from TTRH than either of the ISIS/Chrome Dreams compilations, including selections from The White Stripes and The Clash.

None of the sets include any commentary from Dylan or other material from Theme Time Radio Hour.

=== Commercial affiliations ===
During the "Days of the Week" show broadcast in October 2007, Dylan received a supposed email from listener, "Jackie Vann" who wrote in part, "...what is your take on Sheryl Crow using Buddy Holly's great Not Fade Away for a TV hair dye commercial? I felt the most awful, stinging disappointment when I first heard it. I felt betrayed by Crow, as I'm almost sure Buddy would have. He was such a stickler for controlling his own material. I can't imagine his liking this commercial adaptation." Dylan responded with a list of artists "proud of commercial affiliation", including Sonny Boy Williamson, Jimmie Rodgers, and himself.

Later in October 2007, the Cadillac luxury car and SUV division of General Motors and XM Radio released a cross-promotional advertising campaign featuring Bob Dylan and Theme Time Radio Hour. Elements of the campaign included Dylan appearing in a television commercial for the 2008 Cadillac Escalade hybrid, and a TTRH episode dedicated to the theme, "Cadillac". At approximately the same time, Cadillac became a formal sponsor of Theme Time Radio Hour, acknowledged with a brief announcement at the beginning of the show, as well as with a branded badge on the show's web page.

As could be expected, Dylan's participation was greeted with almost universal criticism from both the mainstream press and Web commentators.

Cadillac and XM Radio also published a web page in 2007 featuring a promotional version of the first half of the TTRH "Cadillac" show, as well as different versions of Dylan's television commercial. That page was removed from the XM Radio site in late 2009.

=== The Theme Time Radio Hour poster ===
In late October 2007, the pop-culture web site Boing Boing posted an article on a promotional poster TTRH producer Eddie Gorodetsky commissioned from artist/illustrator Jaime Hernandez. Each of the scenes illustrated in the poster refer to Ellen Barkin's "It's Night in the Big City," introductions from Season 1 of TTRH. Fan Simon Nielsen (aka "ukulele.elvis") would later create a multimedia walkthrough of the TTRH poster, using Ellen Barkin's introductions as the voiceover. The walkthrough was also featured on BoingBoing, and Nielsen received a congratulatory email from XM Chief Creative Officer, Lee Abrams, on his initiative.

The poster was available as a free high-resolution download at bobdylan.com from October 2007 through July 2008. However, that link was discontinued upon the relaunch of the bobdylan.com site on July 29, 2008. A print version of the poster was offered to the first 5,000 people to order any one of the three Bootleg Series Volume 8: Tell Tale Signs packages being sold through the site.

=== Leftovers again? ===
To the disappointment of many fans, the "Halloween" episode for Season 2 was a re-run from Season 1, rather than original programming. Season 2 would include two other Season 1 re-runs, both also holiday shows - the "Thanksgiving Leftovers" show and the "Christmas/New Years" episode. As Season 2 began midway through the month of September, it would not be until January 2008 before TTRH would air a complete month of original programming.

=== TTRH on and off AOL Radio ===
In November 2007, AOL Radio removed XM Radio's "Deep Tracks" station from its free online playlist. An XM Radio representative responded to an email inquiry that AOL Radio rotated XM Radio channels, and that the "Deep Tracks" channel could be expected to eventually return. The channel did reappear on the AOL Radio playlist in January 2008, but later in the year XM Radio announced that it was ending its relationship with AOL Radio and that no XM Radio channels would be available through AOL Radio after April 30, 2008.

=== Notable shows ===
In October 2007, TTRH aired the series' long-promised "Classic Rock" episode, with the music featuring rocks of the mineral sort. Later that year TTRH would do a second "Countdown" show, with all-new material, the series first theme to cross two seasons.

In February 2008, The "President's Day" episode was a surprise two-hour show. It showcased both music with a "presidential" theme as well as music relating to earlier themes, similar to the "Thanksgiving Leftovers" and "Spring Cleaning" shows from Season One. Dylan remarked in explanation that Theme Time Radio Hour was "having a President's Day Sale" of music that hadn't been included in their original theme shows.

Two themes extended over two weeks: "Around the World" Parts 1 and 2, and "Birds" and "More Birds."

=== Starbucks and "Tim Ziegler" ===
During the "Lock & Key" show broadcast in January 2008, Dylan lectured a supposed telephone caller, "Tim Ziegler", arguing that Theme Time Radio Hour "isn't a classroom," after Ziegler complained that Dylan had gotten a record label wrong. Later in the year, the Starbucks coffee house chain released a Bob Dylan Artist's Choice CD, featuring music chosen by Dylan. The credits noted that the compilation was produced by "Tim Ziegler".

=== Abrupt end to Season 2? ===
In March 2008, Lee Abrams, XM Radio Chief Creative Officer and the person who brought Dylan to the station, announced that he was moving to a new job at the Tribune Company beginning April 1, 2008. Also that month, the U.S. Department of Justice announced that it had approved the buyout of XM Radio by Sirius Satellite Radio, removing one major roadblock to the proposed merger which was eventually completed in late July 2008.

While apparently unrelated to those announcements, Bob Dylan closed the "Cold" show on April 2, 2008, with the news that it was the last show of Season 2, noting that "...This is our final show of the season. We’re gonna go away for a little while, but not for too long. Just long enough to look for some more themes and records to go along with them. In the meantime, you try to stay warm. Be careful, 'cause I'll be counting heads when we come back for Season 3. You better be there! See you soon."

There was some fan speculation in online forums that Season Two came to an unplanned, early close possibly caused by Abrams departure, the Sirius merger, or some other, unknown reason. Supporters of this theory point to the facts that Season One had aired 50 original shows broadcast over a year; that unlike Season One there was no pre-announcement of the final show of Season Two; that announced Season Two shows never aired; and that Dylan's closing statement appeared to be a last-minute addition to the "Cold" show, as no closing credits were read.

On the other hand, Season Two of TTRH had exactly half - 25 - of the original shows broadcast in Season One. Season Two also ended almost six months to the day after beginning, and Season Three started almost exactly six months after the close of Season Two. All this lends credence to the theory that after a successful first season, the Theme Time Radio Hour producers negotiated a new contract requiring less original material and fewer episodes than Season One.

== Season 2 - Episodes 51 to 75 ==
=== Episode 51: Hello ===
First aired on September 19, 2007.

1. "Hello" – Sherman Williams Orchestra (1948)
2. "Hello Mary Lou" – Ricky Nelson (1961)
3. "Hello It's Me" – Nazz (1968)
4. "Hello Darlin'" – Conway Twitty (1970)
5. "Hello Josephine" – Luke "Long Gone" Miles (1969)
6. "I Wanna Say Hello" – Pee Wee King (195 ?)
7. "Hello, Mello Baby" – The Mardi Gras Loungers (1955)
8. "Hello Trouble (Come on In)" – Buck Owens (1964)
9. "Hello, Aloha! How Are You?" – The Radiolites (1926)
10. "Hello Walls" – Willie Nelson (1962)
11. "Hello Stranger" – The Carter Family (1939)
12. "Hello Stranger" – Barbara Lewis (1963)
13. "Hello In There" – John Prine (1971)
14. "Hello I Must Be Going" – Groucho Marx (1972)
15. "Hello, Goodbye" – The Beatles (1967)

=== Episode 52: Young and Old ===
First aired on September 26, 2007.

1. "As the Years Go Passing By" – Albert King (1959)
2. "Smells Like Teen Spirit" – The Bad Plus (2003)
3. "Young Man Blues" – Mose Allison (1957)
4. "Small Fry" – Hot Lips Page (1938)
5. "Stardust" – Hoagy Carmichael
6. "Like Young" – Linda Lawson (1960)
7. "I Don't Want To Grow Up" – The Ramones (1995)
8. "Enjoy Yourself (It's Later than You Think)" – Guy Lombardo & His Royal Canadians (1949)
9. "Enjoy Yourself (It's Later than You Think)" – Prince Buster (1968)
10. "Separation Line" – Laura Lee (1970)
11. "Older Guys" – The Flying Burrito Brothers (1970)
12. "Young Fashioned Ways" – Muddy Waters (1955)
13. "We Live A Long Long Time To Get Old" – Jimmy Murphy (1951)
14. "Elderly Man River" – Stan Freberg (1957)
15. "Old And Only In The Way" – Charlie Poole (1928)
16. "Aged And Mellow" – Esther Phillips (1952)
17. "Old Man" – Neil Young (1972)
18. "Happy Birthday Everybody" – Ray Barretto (1967)

=== Episode 53: Days of the Week ===
First aired on October 3, 2007.

1. "Seven Days" – Sterling Harrison (2007)
2. "Sunday Bloody Sunday" – U2 (1983)
3. "Lucy Mae Blues" – Frankie Lee Sims (1953)
4. "Blue Monday" – Smiley Lewis (1954)
5. "Ruby Tuesday" – The Rolling Stones (1967)
6. "Blowin' in the Wind" – played on recorder by Bob Dylan (2007)
7. "Tomorrow Night" – Lonnie Johnson (1947)
8. "Wednesday Week" – The Undertones (1980)
9. "Thursday" – Morphine (1993)
10. "Old Fashioned Morphine" – Jolie Holland (2004)
11. "Friday on My Mind" – The Easybeats (1966)
12. "Lonely Weekends" – Charlie Rich (1960)
13. "(Looking For) The Heart of Saturday Night" – Tom Waits (1974)
14. "Wasted Days and Wasted Nights" – Doug Sahm (1971)
15. "You Are My Sunshine" – Jimmie Davis (1940)
16. "Sunday Mornin' Comin' Down" – Kris Kristofferson (1970)
17. "Nights in White Satin" – Ramsey Lewis (1973)

=== Episode 54: California ===
First aired on October 10, 2007.

1. "Dragnet" Theme – Ray Anthony Orchestra (1953)
2. "California, Here I Come" – Al Jolson (1924)
3. "California" – Joni Mitchell (1971)
4. "California Blues" – Webb Pierce (1951)
5. "When You Wish Upon a Star" – Glenn Miller (1940)
6. "Go West" – Geraint Watkins (2004)
7. "The Ecstasy of Gold" – Ennio Morricone (1966)
8. "Do You Know the Way to San Jose" – Dionne Warwick (1968)
9. "Mendocino" – Sir Douglas Quintet (1969)
10. "California Blues" – Webb Pierce (1951)
11. "Whittier Boulevard" – Thee Midniters (1965)
12. "Mambo Del Pachuco" – Don Tosti Y Su Conjunto (1948)
13. "Surfer Girl" – Dave Alvin (2006)
14. "San Francisco Bay Blues" – Jesse Fuller (1963)
15. "Going Hollywood" – Original soundtrack (1933)
16. "I’ve Been To Hollywood" – Dorothy Shay (1946)
17. "California Dreamin'" – Bobby Womack (1968)
18. "Goodbye California" – Jolie Holland (2004)
19. "This Land Is Your Land" – ?

=== Episode 55: Classic Rock ===
First aired on October 17, 2007.

1. "Third Stone from the Sun" – Jimi Hendrix (1967)
2. "Be Careful Of The Stones That You Throw" – The Staple Singers (1964)
3. "Rude Rude Rudee" – Prince Buster (1965)
4. "Rock Around The Rock Pile" – Ray Anthony Orchestra (1956)
5. "Rollin' Stone" – Muddy Waters (1950)
6. "Rock of Ages" – The Stanley Brothers and The Clinch Mountain Boys (1958-1961)
7. "Sticks and Stones" – Ray Charles (1960)
8. "Gonna Dance All Night" – Hardrock Gunter (1954)
9. "Chinese Rocks" – The Heartbreakers feat. Johnny Thunders (1977)
10. "Rocky Top" – The Osborne Brothers (1967)
11. "A Tombstone Every Mile" – Dick Curless (1965)
12. "Rollin' Stone" – The Marigolds (1955)
13. "Uranium Rock" – Warren Smith (1958)
14. "Gonna Fly Now" – Bill Conti (1977)
15. "Your Love Belongs Under A Rock" – The Dirtbombs (2001)
16. "Sam Stone" – Swamp Dogg (1972)

=== Episode 56: Cadillac ===
First aired on October 24, 2007.

1. "A Pretty Girl (A Cadillac And Some Money)" – Buddy Johnson & his Orchestra (1954)
2. "Brand New Cadillac" – Vince Taylor and his Playboys (1959)
3. "Pink Cadillac" – Paul Bascomb (1952)
4. "Cadillac In Model ‘A’" – Bob Wills & His Texas Playboys (1954)
5. "Cadillac" – Bo Diddley (1961)
6. "Real Gone Daddy" – Howie Stange (1958)
7. "Mr Thrill" – Mildred Jones (1954)
8. "Cadillac Jack" – Andre Williams (1968)
9. "Jeannie With The Light Brown Cadillac" – Red Simpson (1967)
10. "Courtin’ In Cadillac" – Jerry McCain (1965)
11. "Long White Cadillac" – The Blasters (1990)
12. "Speedoo" – The Cadillacs (1955)
13. "Geronimo's Cadillac" – Michael Martin Murphey (1972)
14. "Swing Low, Sweet Cadillac" – Dizzy Gillespie (1959)
15. "Be Thankful for What You Got" – William DeVaughn (1974)

=== Episode 57: Head to Toe ===
First aired on November 7, 2007.

1. "From Head To Toe" – Smokey Robinson & The Miracles (1965)
2. "Dry Bones" – The Delta Rhythm Boys (1953)
3. "I've Got You Under My Skin" – Louis Prima & Keely Smith (1959)
4. "I Wan'na Be Like You (The Monkey Song)" – Louis Prima (1967)
5. "A Fistful Of Dollars" – Ennio Morricone (1964)
6. "Fist City" – Loretta Lynn (1968)
7. "Down On Bended Knee" – Johnny Copeland (1962)
8. "Heart Of Glass" – Blondie (1978)
9. "Ten Tiny Toes, One Baby Nose" – Sol Hoʻopiʻi and His Novelty Quartet (1933)
10. "Finger Poppin' Time" – Hank Ballard & The Midnighters (1960)
11. "Roll In My Sweet Baby's Arms" – The Monroe Brothers (1936)
12. "Big Legs" – Gene Phillips (1947)
13. "Moulty" – The Barbarians (1966)
14. "She's Scattered Everywhere" – Archibald (1950)
15. "If I Only Had a Brain (The Wizard Of Oz)" – Shorty Rogers (1959)
16. "Brain Cloudy Blues" – Bob Wills & His Texas Playboys (1946)
17. "Waist Deep in the Big Muddy" – Pete Seeger (1967)
18. "With Arms Outstretched" – Rilo Kiley (2002)

=== Episode 58: Smoking ===
First aired on November 14, 2007.

1. "Smoke Gets In Your Eyes" – Coleman Hawkins (1962)
2. "Smokin'" – Howard Roberts (1963)
3. "Smoke! Smoke! Smoke! (That Cigarette)" – Tex Williams & His Western Caravan (1947)
4. "Lipstick Traces (on a Cigarette)" – The O'Jays (1965)
5. "Dim Lights, Thick Smoke (And Loud, Loud Music)" – Joe Maphis & Rose Lee Maphis (1952)
6. "Reefer Man" – Baron Lee & The Mills Blue Rhythm Band (1942)
7. "The Weed" – Steve Purdy & The Studs (1962)
8. "More Cigarettes" – The Replacements (1981)
9. "Smoking Woman On The Street" – Reverend J. M. Gates (approx 1934–41)
10. "Smoke Rings" – Sam Cooke (1962)
11. "Chew Tobacco Rag" – Billy Briggs (1951)
12. "Nicotine" – Paul Chaplain & His Emeralds (1960)
13. "Theme from The Magnificent Seven" – Elmer Bernstein (1960)
14. "Smokin' in the Boys Room" – Brownsville Station (1973)
15. "Let It All Hang Out" – The Hombres (1967)
16. "Cigareets, Whuskey And Wild, Wild Women" – Red Ingle & The Natural Seven (1947)
17. "Cigarette" – The Visions (1963)
18. "Tobacco Road" – John D. Loudermilk (1960)

=== Episode 59: Dreams ===
First aired on November 28, 2007.

1. "Darn That Dream" – Harold Land (1954)
2. "Darn That Dream" – Dinah Washington (1954)
3. "All I Have to Do Is Dream" – The Everly Brothers (1958)
4. "Mr. Sandman" – Chet Atkins (1955)
5. "The Boulevard of Broken Dreams" – Tony Bennett (1950)
6. "I’ve Got Dreams To Remember" – Otis Redding (1968)
7. "In Dreams" – Roy Orbison (1963)
8. "Weird Nightmare" – Charles Mingus (1946)
9. "Sh-Boom" – The Chords (1954)
10. "When I Stop Dreaming" – The Louvin Brothers (1955)
11. "Daydream" – The Lovin' Spoonful (1966)
12. "Do You Keep On Dreaming?" – The Cherry Pies (1963)
13. "Just A Dream (On My Mind)" – Big Bill Broonzy (1939)
14. "When I Grow Too Old To Dream" – Arnett Cobb (1947)
15. "Innocent When You Dream" – Tom Waits (1987)

=== Episode 60: Party ===
First aired on December 5, 2007.

1. "All Tomorrow's Parties" – The Velvet Underground (1967)
2. "Ain’t Nothin’ But A House Party" – The Show Stoppers (1968)
3. "Hot Barbeque" – Brother Jack McDuff (1965)
4. "Let's Have a Party" – Wanda Jackson (1958)
5. "Let's Party" – Jesse Allen (1952)
6. "Baby Gotta Party" – Don & Dewey (1957)
7. "It's My Party" – Lesley Gore (1963)
8. "Soul Bossa Nova" – Quincy Jones & His Orchestra feat. Rahsaan Roland Kirk (1962)
9. "Party Doll" – Buddy Knox (1957)
10. "Caldonia's Party" – Smiley Lewis (1953)
11. "I Paid For The Party" – The Enchanters (1965)
12. "Party Lights" – Claudine Clark (1962)
13. "Carnival Time" – Al Johnson (1960)
14. "House Party" – Louis Jordan & His Tympany Five (1953)
15. "The Party" – Dolly Parton & Porter Wagoner (1968)
16. "After The Bacchanal" – Lord Beginner (1939)
17. "Party Girl" – Elvis Costello & The Attractions (1979)
18. "The Party's Over" – Blossom Dearie (1959)

=== Episode 61: Second Countdown ===
First aired on December 12, 2007.

1. "Eve's Ten Commandments" – Helen Fleming (1966)
2. "Rocket No. 9" – Sun Ra & His Outer Space Arkestra (1968)
3. "Nine Have Tried (And Nine Have Died)" – The Carlisles (1955)
4. "Beat Me Daddy, Eight to the Bar" – The Andrews Sisters (1940)
5. "7 Heures Du Matin" – Jacqueline Taïeb (1967)
6. "007 (Shanty Town)" – Desmond Dekker & The Aces (1967)
7. "James Bond 007 Theme" – John Barry (1963)
8. "Six Days on the Road" – Dave Dudley (1963)
9. "Five O’Clock Whistle" – Duke Ellington & Ivie Anderson (1940)
10. "Four Five Or Six" – Milton Brown & His Musical Brownies (1934)
11. "Three Hearts in a Tangle" – James Brown (1962)
12. "Cocktails for Two" – Spike Jones & His City Slickers (1944)
13. "I Want Two Wings" – Rev. Utah Smith (1944)
14. "One Bad Stud" – The Honey Bears (1954)
15. "One Hand Loose" – Charlie Feathers (1956)
16. "Less Than Zero (Dallas Version)" – Elvis Costello (1978)

=== Episode 62: Number One ===
First aired on January 2, 2008.

1. "One" – Harry Nilsson (1968)
2. "First Time I Met The Blues" – Buddy Guy (1960)
3. "The One You Slip Around With" – Jan Howard with Wynn Stewart's Band (1959)
4. "Dedicated to the One I Love" – The "5" Royales (1957)
5. "One Night" – Smiley Lewis (1956)
6. "One Night" – Elvis Presley (1958)
7. "First I Look at the Purse" – The Contours (1965)
8. "Johnny One Note" – Anita O'Day (1960)
9. "One Meat Ball" – Josh White (1944)
10. "I'm The One Who Loves You" – The Impressions (1963)
11. "Make Us One" – Miriam Makeba & The Skylarks (1959)
12. "One Time, One Night" – Los Lobos (1987)
13. "Just One More Time" – Billy Gayles with Ike Turner's The Kings of Rhythm (1956)
14. "One Step Beyond" – Prince Buster (1964)
15. "Just One More" – George Jones (1956)
16. "One More Mile To Go" – Otis Spann (1964)

=== Episode 63: Walking ===
First aired on January 9, 2008.

1. "The Way I Walk" – Jack Scott & The Chantones (1959)
2. "Walkin’ With Frankie" – Frankie Lee Sims (1957)
3. "Walk Right In" – Gus Cannon's Jug Stompers (1930)
4. "Walk Away Renée – Left Banke (1966)
5. "Walk 'Em" – Buddy Johnson & His Orchestra (1945)
6. "I'm Walkin’" – Fats Domino (1957)
7. "Walking By Myself" – Jimmy Rogers & Walter Horton (1956)
8. "Walk on the Wild Side" – Lou Reed (1972)
9. "Only Daddy That'll Walk the Line" – Waylon Jennings (1968)
10. "Walkin’ Slow Behind You" – Jimmy Rushing with Count Basie & his Orchestra (1949)
11. "Walkin’ With Mr. Lee" – Lee Allen (1958)
12. "Jake Walk Blues" – The Allen Brothers (1930)
13. "My Walking Stick" – The Mills Brothers with Louis Armstrong (1938)
14. "The Walk" – Jimmy McCracklin (1958)
15. "Walk, Don't Run" – Johnny Smith (1954)
16. "Why I'm Walkin'" – Stonewall Jackson (1960)
17. "You'll Never Walk Alone" – Nina Simone (1957)

=== Episode 64: Around the World I ===
First aired on January 17, 2008.

1. "Rhode Island Is Famous For You" – Blossom Dearie (1959)
2. "Down in Mexico" – The Coasters (1956)
3. "Acapulco Rock" – Freddy Fender (1961)
4. "Werewolves of London" – Warren Zevon (1978)
5. "Werewolf" – The Frantics (1960)
6. "Dark Streets of London" – The Pogues (1984)
7. "Sous Le Ciel De Paris" – Édith Piaf (1954)
8. "Istanbul (Not Constantinople)" – The Four Lads (1953)
9. "A Sambe Siye E Guli (Let's Go To Johannesburg)" – Shoba (1983)
10. "She Never Spoke Spanish To Me" – Joe Ely (1977)
11. "Aquarela do Brasil" – Toots Thielemans & Elis Regina (1969)
12. "Blue Canadian Rockies" – The Byrds (1968)
13. "Hunting Tigers Out In India" – Hal Swain & His Band (1930)
14. "Made In Japan" – Buck Owens (1972)
15. "How Are Things in Glocca Morra?" – Sonny Rollins (1947)
16. "Hail, Hail Freedonia" – The Marx Brothers (1933)
17. "Back in the U.S.S.R." – The Beatles (1968)
18. "Theme Around The World In 80 Days" – (1956)

=== Episode 65: Around the World II ===
First aired on January 23, 2008.

1. "Theme Around The World In 80 Days" – Victor Young & His Orchestra (1956)
2. "All Around The World" – Little Willie John (1955)
3. "Nuevo Laredo" – Sir Douglas Quintet (1970)
4. "Ferry Cross the Mersey" – Gerry & The Pacemakers (1964)
5. "Apache" – The Shadows (1960)
6. "A Night in Tunisia" – Charlie Parker & Dizzy Gillespie (1945)
7. "Africa" – Celia Cruz (1997)
8. "When the Swallows Come Back to Capistrano" – The Ink Spots (1940)
9. "I Come From Jamaica" – Chris Powell & His Blue Flames (1952)
10. "Japanese Girl" – Lloyd Clarke (1963)
11. "Going To Germany" – Gus Cannon's Jug Stompers (1929)
12. "Ubangi Stomp" – Warren Smith (1956)
13. "Rockin’ In The Congo" – Hank Thompson (1957)
14. "Loch Lomond" – Maxine Sullivan (1937)
15. "The Irish Rover" – The Clancy Brothers (1962)
16. "Travelin' Man" – Ricky Nelson (1961)
17. "I Don't Intend To Die In Egyptland" – Josh White (1933)
18. "Arrivederci Roma" – Dean Martin (1962)
19. "Whole Wide World" – Wreckless Eric (1978)

=== Episode 66: Lock & Key ===
First aired on January 30, 2008.

1. "Lock And Key" – Bessie Smith (1927)
2. "The Key (To Your Door)" – Sonny Boy Williamson II (1956)
3. "Ouvre Cette Porte (Open This Door)" – Adam Hebert & The Country Playboys (1964)
4. "Unlock The Lock" – Jimmy Nelson (1951)
5. "Changed the Locks" – Lucinda Williams (1988)
6. "When Jimmy Valentine Gets Out" – Bing Crosby (1939)
7. "Somebody Changed The Lock On My Door" – Wynonie Harris (1945)
8. "Open the Door, Richard" – Dusty Fletcher (1945)
9. "Open the Door, Richard" – Jack McVea and His All Stars (1946)
10. "Open The Door" – Clive and Naomi (1965)
11. "Key to the Highway" – Little Walter (1958)
12. "Ten Long Fingers" – Groovey Joe Poovey (1958)
13. "Who Stole the Lock on the Henhouse Door" – Henry "Red" Allen (1932)
14. "You're Bound To Look Like a Monkey" – Milton Brown & His Musical Brownies (1935)
15. "You Don't Knock" – The Detroit Cobras (2004)

=== Episode 67: Mail ===
First aired on February 6, 2008.

1. "I Wrote You A Letter" – John Worthan (1958)
2. "Please Mr. Postman" – The Marvelettes (1961)
3. "Write Me A Letter" – The Ravens (1947)
4. "The Letter" – The Box Tops (1967)
5. "Mailman's Sack" – Tiny Bradshaw & His Orchestra (1952)
6. "Take a Letter Maria" – R.B. Greaves (1969)
7. "Mail Myself To You" – Earl Robinson (1972)
8. "The Letter" – The Medallions (1954)
9. "A Letter Home" – Memphis Slim (1949)
10. "A Dear John Letter" – Jean Shepard & Ferlin Husky (1953)
11. "That's All She Wrote" – Eddy Arnold (1959)
12. "I'm Gonna Sit Right Down and Write Myself a Letter" – Fats Waller (1935)
13. "No Mail Today" – Gene Terry and The Downbeats (1958)
14. "Tear-Stained Letter" – Jo-El Sonnier (1987)
15. "Air Mail Special On The Fly" – Jim & Jesse McReynolds & The Virginia Boys (1952–55)
16. "The Glory of Love" – The Velvetones (1957)
17. "A Letter To Heaven" – Sister Wynona Carr (1949-54 released in 1992)

=== Episode 68: President's Day ===
First aired on February 13, 2008 and rebroadcast in Season Three.

1. "White House Blues" – Charlie Poole & The North Carolina Ramblers (1926)
2. "Hello Sundown" – Johnnie Taylor (1967)
3. "Hello Little Boy" – Ruth Brown with The Rhythmakers (1954)
4. "James K. Polk" – They Might Be Giants (1996)
5. "Polk Salad Annie" – Tony Joe White (1969)
6. "Charles Guiteau" – Kelly Harrell & the Virginia String Band (1927)
7. "I Don't Want To Be President" – Percy Mayfield (1974)
8. "I Feel That Old Age Coming On" – Wynonie Harris (1949)
9. "Lincoln And Liberty Too" – Pete Seeger (1960)
10. "Living In The White House" – J. B. Lenoir (1953)
11. "Don't Smoke in Bed" – Nina Simone (1958)
12. "Roosevelt's In Trinidad" – Attila (1933)
13. "Why I like Roosevelt" – The Soul Stirrers (1947)
14. "It's All in the Game" – Tommy Edwards (1958)
15. "Walkin’" – Joe Liggins & His Honeydrippers (1946)
16. "When You Walk in the Room" – Jackie DeShannon (1964)
17. "High Hopes" – Frank Sinatra (1960)
18. "Mr. Moon" – Clover (1971)
19. "Superbird" – Country Joe & The Fish (1967)
20. "Funky President (People It's Bad)" – James Brown (1974)
21. "Gloomy Sunday" – Billie Holiday (1941)
22. "That Was The President" – Phil Ochs (1965)
23. "(Gotta Go) Upside Your Head" – Buddy & Ella Johnson (1954)
24. "Dead Presidents" – Little Walter (1964)
25. "Impeach the President" – Roy C & The Honeydrippers (1973)
26. "Politics" – Hank Penny (1948)
27. "Richard Nixon" – Rod Rogers & The MSR Singers (1969)
28. "Jimmy Carter Says Yes" – Gene Marshall (1977)
29. "Mr. President (Have Pity On The Working Man)" – Randy Newman (1974)
30. "If I Can Dream" – Elvis Presley (1968)

=== Episode 69: Doctors ===
First aired on February 20, 2008.

1. "U.M.M.G. (Upper Manhattan Medical Group)" – Duke Ellington & His Orchestra (1967)
2. "Dear Doctor" – The Rolling Stones (1968)
3. "Saint James Infirmary" – Snooks Eaglin (1959)
4. "Operation Blues" – Homer Clemons & His Texas Swingbillies (1947)
5. "Send For The Doctor" – Doc Pomus (1950)
6. "Doctor, My Eyes" – Jackson Browne (1972)
7. "Long John Blues" – Dinah Washington (1948)
8. "Dr. Kinsey Report" – Lord Lebby (1955)
9. "Drinkin’ Hadacol" – Little Willie Littlefield (1949)
10. "Valse De Hadacol" – Leroy ‘Happy Fats’ LeBlanc (1950)
11. "Hadacol Bounce" – Professor Longhair (1949)
12. "Hadacol Boogie" – Bill Nettles & The Dixie Blue Boys (1949)
13. "Walking Dr. Bill" – B.B. King (1961)
14. "The Great Medical Menagerist" – Harmonica Frank (1954)
15. "Would You Believe It (I Have A Cold)" – Huey "Piano" Smith and Clowns (1959)
16. "Girl You Have No Faith In Medicine" – The White Stripes (2002)
17. "You Done What The Doctor Couldn't Do" – Archie Brownlee and The Five Blind Boys of Mississippi (1948-59)

=== Episode 70: Danger ===
First aired on February 27, 2008.

1. "Danger Zone" – The Sunshine Boys (1949)
2. "Better Beware" – Esther Phillips (1951)
3. "Eye Of Danger" – Michigan & Smiley (1979)
4. "You're The Dangerous Type" – Bob Dorough (1956)
5. "Be Careful What You Do" – John Brim (1952)
6. "Diesel Smoke (Dangerous Curves)" – Doye O'Dell (1952)
7. "Crawling from the Wreckage" – Dave Edmunds (1979)
8. "Hey Mr Caution" – Eddie Constantine (1965)
9. "D Is for Dangerous" – Arctic Monkeys (2007)
10. "Armed and Extremely Dangerous" – First Choice (1973)
11. "Dangerous Crossing" – Cousin Keith Loyd (1955)
12. "Danger Zone" – Mercy Dee Walton (1951)
13. "Shake Hands With Danger" – Charles Oldfather (1980)

=== Episode 71: Birds ===
First aired on March 5, 2008.

1. "The Rooster Song" – Fats Domino (1957)
2. "Chicken Rhythm" – Slim Gaillard (1939)
3. "Cooing to the Wrong Pigeon" – Merrill Moore (1956)
4. "Bluebird" – Buffalo Springfield (1967)
5. "Chicken" – Mississippi John Hurt (1966)
6. "The Coo Coo Bird" – Clarence Ashley (1961)
7. "Serenade to a Cuckoo" – Rahsaan Roland Kirk (1964)
8. "Bird on the Wire" – Leonard Cohen (1969)
9. "When the Red, Red Robin (Comes Bob, Bob, Bobbin' Along)" – Al Jolson (1926)
10. "Buzzard Pie" – Rudy Green & His Orchestra (1947)
11. "Daffy Duck's Rhapsody" – Mel Blanc (1950)
12. "Ice Cream for Crow" – Captain Beefheart and The Magic Band (1982)
13. "The Great Speckled Bird" – Roy Acuff & his Crazy Tennesseans (1936)
14. "Night Owl" – Tony Allen & The Champs (1955)
15. "Wings of a Dove" – The Blues Busters (1965)
16. "Shake a Tail Feather" – The Five Du-Tones (1963)

=== Episode 72: More Birds ===
First aired on March 12, 2008.

1. "The Red Rooster" – Howlin' Wolf (1961)
2. "Little Wing" – The Jimi Hendrix Experience (1967)
3. "Bye Bye Blackbird" – Miles Davis (1957)
4. "Bye Bye Blackbird" – Charlie & His Orchestra (1942)
5. "Skylark" – Anita O'Day with Gene Krupa & his Orchestra (1942)
6. "Little Bluebird" – Johnnie Taylor (1966)
7. "Listen to the Mocking Bird" – Light Crust Doughboys (1936-41)
8. "Mockingbird" – Inez Foxx with Charlie Foxx (1963)
9. "Bluebirds over the Mountain" – Ersel Hickey (1958)
10. "Why Is Woody Sad?" – Bobby Pauneto (1960)
11. "The Chicken And The Hawk" – Big Joe Turner (1956)
12. "The Bird's The Word" – The Rivingtons (1963)
13. "Surfin' Bird" – The Trashmen (1963)
14. "Big Bird" – Eddie Floyd (1968)
15. "Yellow Bird" – Arthur Lyman (1961)
16. "Bird Gets the Worm" – Charlie Parker (1947)
17. "White Dove" – The Stanley Brothers (1949)
18. "When Doves Cry" – Prince and The Revolution (1984)

=== Episode 73: Joe ===
First aired on March 19, 2008.

1. "Killer Joe" – Toots Thielemans (1978)
2. "Ragtime Cowboy Joe" – Foy Willing and the Riders of the Purple Sage (1946)
3. "Take the "A" Train" – Duke Ellington & His Orchestra (1941)
4. "Hold ‘Em Joe" – Andre Toussaint (194 ?)
5. "Cotton-Eyed Joe" – Bob Wills & His Texas Playboys (1946)
6. "No, No, Joe" – Hank Williams Sr (1950)
7. "Joe Louis Is A Fightin’ Man" – The Dixieaires (1947)
8. "Joe Hill" – Joan Baez (1970)
9. "Diamond Joe" – The Georgia Crackers (1927)
10. "Ride On Josephine" – Bo Diddley (1961)
11. "Subway Joe" – Joe Bataan (1968)
12. "Chicago" – Quintet of the Hot Club of France feat. Django Reinhardt & Stéphane Grappelli (1937)
13. "Old Black Joe" – Jerry Lee Lewis (1960)
14. "Where's Joe?" – Blue Lu Barker (1946)
15. "Diamond Joe" – Cisco Houston (1952)
16. "Get That Communist, Joe" – The Kavaliers (1954)
17. "I'm Tired Joey Boy" – Van Morrison (1989)

=== Episode 74: Heat ===
First aired on March 26, 2008.

1. "There'll Be a Hot Time in the Old Town Tonight" – Bessie Smith (1927)
2. "Jump into the Fire" – Harry Nilsson (1972)
3. "Go Ahead And Burn" – Bobby Moore & the Rhythm Aces (1966)
4. "There's A Fire" – The Gaylads (1969)
5. "Fever / Comin' Home Baby (Medley)" – Ernie Freeman Combo
6. "Play with Fire" – The Rolling Stones (1965)
7. "Soul On Fire" – LaVern Baker (1953)
8. "Hot And Cold" – Marvin Rainwater (1956)
9. "Let's Have Some Heat" – Pigmeat Markham (1968)
10. "Red Hot" – Billy "The Kid" Emerson (1955)
11. "Red Hot" – Billy Lee Riley (1957)
12. "Baby It's Hot" – The Olympics (1962)
13. "Burn The Honky Tonk Down" – George Jones (1986)
14. "Hot Pants" – James Brown (1971)
15. "Great Balls of Fire" – Jerry Lee Lewis (1957)
16. "Hot Little Mama" – Johnny "Guitar" Watson (1955)
17. "Fuego d’Amor" – Johnny Cash (1963)

=== Episode 75: Cold ===
First aired on April 2, 2008.

1. "Cold Sweat" – James Brown (1967)
2. "Cold Cold Feeling" – T-Bone Walker (1952)
3. "The Cold Hard Facts of Life" – Porter Wagoner (1967)
4. "Baby, It's Cold Outside" – Ray Charles & Betty Carter (1961)
5. "Cold Turkey" – John Lennon (1969)
6. "Winter Time Blues" – Lightnin' Slim (1962)
7. "When the Tingle Becomes a Chill" – Loretta Lynn (1976)
8. "The Chill Is On" – Big Joe Turner (1951)
9. "Chilly Winds (Lonesome Road Blues)" – Doc Watson & Clarence Ashley (1961)
10. "Warm To Cool To Cold" – Willie Walker (1968)
11. "Defrost Your Heart" – Charlie Feathers (1956)
12. "Stone Cold Man" – The Charmer (1953)
13. "So Cold, So Dead, So Soon" – Roy Hogsed (1947)
14. "I Can Feel The Ice Melting" – The Parliaments (1967)
15. "Cold Cold Ground" – Tom Waits (1987)
