= Who Stole My Monkey? =

Studio album by Boozoo Chavis
- Released: 1999
- Recorded: September 1998
- Studio: Dockside
- Genre: Zydeco
- Label: Rounder
- Producer: Scott Billington

Boozoo Chavis chronology
Hey Do Right! (1996)	Who Stole My Monkey? (1999)	Johnnie Billy Goat (2000)

Who Stole My Monkey? is an album by the American musician Boozoo Chavis, released in 1999. He is credited with his band, the Majic Sounds (billed on the cover as the Magic Sounds). Who Stole My Monkey? was the first zydeco album to include a Parental Advisory label. Chavis supported the album with a North American tour.

== Production ==
Recorded at Dockside Studio, in Maurice, Louisiana, the album was produced by Scott Billington. Chavis's son Charles sang lead on "Sock It to Me" and "Marksville Slide". The album packaging advises that the concluding two songs, "Uncle Bud" and "Deacon Jones", are not suitable for airplay due to their X-rated lyrics; the songs were originally released as "under-the-counter" 45s. "Lucille" is a version of the Clifton Chenier song.

== Critical reception ==
Professional ratings
Review scores
Source	Rating
AllMusic	3.5/5 stars
Orlando Sentinel	4.5/5 stars
The Penguin Guide to Blues Recordings	2.5/4 stars
Tucson Citizen	A

The Charleston Daily Mail wrote that Chavis's "chugging, circular, single-chord style has proved to be all but inimitable." The Orlando Sentinel said that "Boozoo, [bassist Classie] Ballou and guitarist Carlton 'Guitar' Thomas create complicated harmonic structures with Thomas sometimes echoing Boozoo's phrases, sometimes embellishing them, sometimes supporting them with simple chords and sometimes developing miniature counter-melodies." The Wall Street Journal determined that Chavis's "in-your-face style marks a throwback to a day when musical intensity mattered more than pristine technique or production values."

The Chicago Tribune stated that Chavis "bypasses familiar verse-chorus-verse structures and 4/4 tempos for old-fashioned, cycling riffs and off-kilter, two-step grooves." The San Diego Union-Tribune determined that "his earthy, no-fuss music combines Creole and Cajun traditions with blues, without diluting any of them." The Washington Post opined that the title track gets "mired in the same old drum-bass-rubboard boom-scratcha boom-scratcha of a dozen other zydeco songs." The Tucson Citizen praised the "reedy squeezebox, good-time vocal delivery and playful way with the lyric."

AllMusic wrote that "Boozoo lays down tunes just like he was working a dance in Louisiana rather than making a record in the sterile confines of a recording studio."

== Track listing ==
No.	Title	Length
1.	"Dance All Night"
2.	"Who Stole My Monkey?"
3.	"Marksville Slide"
4.	"I'm Going Away to Stay"
5.	"I Went to the Dance"
6.	"Oh Yeah"
7.	"I Want to Go Home"
8.	"Lucille"
9.	"Ay, Cayenne"
10.	"Baby Please Don't Go"
11.	"Valse de Derniere Fois"
12.	"Sock It to Me"
13.	"Bottle Up and Go"
14.	"Allons a Lafayette"
15.	"Uncle Bud"
16.	"Deacon Jones"
