= April Fool (disambiguation) =

April fool is a phrase associated with April Fools' Day, celebrated on April 1.

April fool or April fools may also refer to:

== Film ==
- April Fool (1926 film), a romantic comedy starring Diana Serra Cary
- April Fool (1964 film), an Indian Hindi-language film
- The April Fools, a 1969 romantic comedy film
- April Fools (2007 film), a 2007 horror film by Fred Walton
- April Fool (2010 film), an Indian Malayalam-language film
- April Fool (2014 film), an Indian Telugu-language film
- April Fools (2015 film), a 2015 Japanese film

== Music ==
- Apryl Fool, a Japanese psychedelic rock band
- "April Fool" (song), a 1986 song by Chalk Circle
- "April Fools" (song), a 1998 song by Rufus Wainwright
- April Fools, a 2016 album by the Scary Jokes
- "April Fool", a 2002 song by Slash from 4
- "April Fool", a 1992 song by Soul Asylum from their album Grave Dancers Union
- "April Fools (He Had the Change Done at the Shop)", a 1996 song on the Frogs' album My Daughter the Broad

== Other ==
- April Fool (spy), the codename for a double agent who allegedly played a key role in the downfall of Saddam Hussein
- The April Fool, a character of The Fairly OddParents animated series
- April Fool (Checkers) 1943, a painting by Norman Rockwell

== See also ==
- April Fool's Day (disambiguation)
- "Fools in April", an episode of SpongeBob SquarePants, that aired along with "Neptunes Spatula" on April 1, 2000
