= La Valse de Madame Sosten =

Single by Joe Falcon
- A-side: "La Valse de Madame Sosten (Mrs. Sosten Waltz)"
- Recorded: December 22, 1934
- Genre: Cajun
- Length: 3:09
- Label: Decca Records 17000-A

"La Valse de Madame Sosten" is the A-side of the 78-RPM single #17000, recorded by Joe Falcon and Cléoma Breaux in 1934. Side B contains "Mes Yeux Bleus" sung by his wife, Cleoma Falcon.

== Content ==
Madame Sosten or "Sosthene" refers to Sosthene Falcon's wife Josephine Trahan. Sosthene Falcon is Joe's older uncle. The song deals with Josephine's daughter, Alida, who is the love interest of a much older man. He begs her parents to have her, even at the point of elopement (taking her through the window).

== Lyrics ==
Cajun French

Oh Madame Sosthène, mais donnez moi Alida,
cette la j'ai aime depuis l'age de quatorze ans
Quand même tu ne veux pas, faudra toujours toi tu viens,
Faudra toi tu viens, mais (z)un beau jour avant d'mourir.

Au jour d'aujourd'hui, mais c'que j'voudrais m'la promène,
ça s'rait tu m'voirais, comment mais moi j'fais pitié.
Tu sais dans toi-même, j'ai plus personne pour m'aimer,
Faudra moi j'l'endure jusqu'à à l'âge de quatorze ans.

C'est dur de me voir, mais m'en aller moi tout seul,
J'suis obligé d'm'en aller, mais par rapport à ça t'as dit.
T'aurais donc voulu, mais m'écouter tu voirais,
Tu voirais pour toi-même mais quoi t'as fais (z)avec moi.

English

Oh Madame Sosthène, let me have Alida,
She's the one I've loved since the age of 14.
Even though you do not want me to, I'll come visit,
Just need to one more time before I die.

Today's the day if you want to come with me,
You will see for yourself, how pitiful I am,
You know this yourself, I have no one to love me,
I've endured this since the age of 14.

It's hard for me to leave by myself,
I have to leave, but, it's because of what you've done,
You should have wanted to listen, but, you'll see,
You'll see for yourself what you've done to me.
