= Theme Time Radio Hour season 3 =

The third season of the Theme Time Radio Hour premiered on Wednesday, October 8, 2008, the same week that saw the release of a new edition of the Bootleg Series, Tell Tale Signs. Somewhat eerily, given that it aired during the week of a worldwide financial crisis caused by the collapse of the credit markets, the first show's theme was "Money: Part 1".

Season Three concluded on Wednesday, April 15, 2009, with the airing of the show's 100th original episode. The theme of that show was "Goodbye".

== Episodes ==
=== Episode 1 (76): Money: Part 1 ===
First aired October 8, 2008

Show track listings:

1. "That's What They Want" – Jerry McCain & His Upstarts
2. "Pennies From Heaven" – Louis Prima
3. "You Put It In, I'll Take It Out" – Papa Charlie Jackson
4. "Blue Money" – Van Morrison
5. "Greenbacks" – Ray Charles
6. "Money" – Mel Blanc
7. "It's The Gold" – The Buddy Johnson Orchestra with Ella Johnson
8. "Farewell To The Gold" – Nic Jones
9. "My Baby's Just Like Money" – Lefty Frizzell
10. "100 Dollar Bill" – Buddy Guy
11. "It's All About The Benjamins" – Puff Daddy and the Family
12. "Your Cash Ain't Nothin' But Trash" – The Clovers
13. "You Can't Take It With You" – Jesse Price

=== Episode 2 (77): Money: Part 2 ===
First aired October 15, 2008

Show track listings:

1. "Gimme My Dime Back, Give Me My Money" – Moon Mullican & His Blue Ridge Playboys
2. "I've Got Money" – James Brown
3. "Penny Reel-O" – Eric "Monty" Morris & Baba Brooks (Harmony by Stranger Cole)
4. "Money Honey" – Clyde McPhatter & The Drifters
5. "Lookin' For Money" – Johnny Dove & His Magnolia Playboys
6. "I Need Money (Keep Your Alibis)" – Slim Harpo
7. "Man With Money" – The Everly Brothers
8. "Clean Money" – Elvis Costello & The Attractions
9. "Last Two Dollars" – Johnnie Taylor
10. "Down To My Last Dime" – Donny Young (Johnny Paycheck)
11. "Romance Without Finance (Is a Nuisance)" – Tiny Grimes Quintette (with Charlie Parker)
12. "For the Love of Money" – The O'Jays
13. "You Can't Take It With You" – Young John Watson (Johnny "Guitar" Watson)

=== Episode 3 (78): Night ===
First aired October 22, 2008

Show track listings:

1. "All Night Long" – Joe Houston & His Rockets (1956)
2. "Such a Night" – Dr. John (1973)
3. "Another Night With The Boys" – The Drifters (with Rudy Lewis – lead vocals) (1962)
4. "When The Sun Goes Down" – Leroy Carr (with Scrapper Blackwell) (1931)
5. "The Way You Look Tonight" – Fred Astaire (with the Oscar Peterson Group) (1936)
6. "Night Life" – Willie Nelson (1960)
7. "In The Night" – Chick Carbo (1962)
8. "Midnight Shift" – Buddy Holly (1959)
9. "Why Don't You Eat Where You Slept Last Night?" – Zuzu Bollin (1951)
10. "Night Time" – The Strangeloves (1965)
11. "In the Night" – Professor Longhair (1954)
12. "Forever Night Shade Mary" – Latin Playboys (1994)
13. "Black Night" – Charles Brown (1951)
14. "Help Me Make It Through the Night" – Kris Kristofferson (1970)

=== Episode 4: President's Day ===
Aired October 29, 2008 as a repeat of the Season 2 episode, which was first broadcast in February 2008.

=== Episode 5 (79): Beginnings, Middles, and Ends ===
First aired November 5, 2008

Show track listings:

1. "I Can't Get Started" – Anita O'Day (with the Buddy Bregman Orchestra)
2. "Don't Start Me To Talkin'" – Sonny Boy Williamson
3. "Start All Over Again" – The J. Geils Band
4. "I'm Beginning to See the Light" – Peggy Lee
5. "Begin the Beguine" – Artie Shaw and His Orchestra (excerpt)
6. "In The Middle Of The Night" – Amos Milburn
7. "The One in the Middle" – Manfred Mann
8. "Smack Dab in the Middle" – Ray Charles
9. "In the Middle of a Heartache" – Wanda Jackson
10. "Half A Boy and Half A Man" – Nick Lowe and His Cowboy Outfit
11. "At The End Of The Lane" – Jimmie Revard and His Oklahoma Playboys
12. "The End of the World" – Skeeter Davis
13. "The End of the Rainbow" – Richard and Linda Thompson
14. "This Is The End" – Buddy Guy

=== Episode 6 (80): Blood ===
First aired November 12, 2008

Show track listings:

1. "Flesh, Blood and Bones" – Little Esther
2. "Are You Washed In The Blood Of The Lamb?" – Da Costa Woltz's Southern Broadcasters
3. "Cold Blooded Woman" – Memphis Slim
4. "Lust Of The Blood" – Jerry Lee Lewis
5. "She Made My Blood Run Cold" – Ike Turner & The Kings of Rhythm
6. "Transfusion" – Nervous Norvus
7. "Bloodstains On The Wall" – Honeyboy
8. "Go Down You Blood Red Roses" – Paul Clayton
9. "Blood On The Moon" – Danny Barker
10. "Bucket O' Blood" – Big Boy Groves
11. "Bloodshot" – The String Kings
12. "The Blood" – Zion Travelers
13. "I've Got Blood In My Eyes For You" – Mississippi Sheiks

=== Episode 7 (81): War ===
First aired November 19, 2008

War was an unusual episode in several respects. Although TTRH has aired three 2-hour specials and the unique Time episode ran slightly over an hour, War was the show's first 90-minute episode. War was the second episode not to feature Ellen Barkin's voice in the opening intro, and the first not to use the "Night in the Big City" introduction. Instead, the show replaced the usual opening with a collage of audio war-related clips. War was also the second episode not to have any closing credits in its premiere broadcast, although the credits were added in later rebroadcasts.

Show track listings:

1. "G.I. Jive" – Louis Jordan and His Tympany Five (1944)
2. "Fightin' In The War With Spain" – Wilmer Watts & The Lonely Eagles (1929)
3. "Searching For A Soldier's Grave" – The Bailes Brothers (1946)
4. "The Horrors Of War" – Atilla The Hun
5. "And the Band Played Waltzing Matilda" – Eric Bogle (1971)
6. "The Battle of New Orleans" – Johnny Horton (1959)
7. "Was My Brother In The Battle?" – Kate & Anna McGarrigle (2010)
8. "Drive Soldiers Drive" – Little Maxie Bailey (1953)
9. "This Cold War With You" – Floyd Tillman (1949)
10. "Universal Soldier" – Buffy Sainte-Marie (1964)
11. "I Believe I'm Gonna Make It" – Joe Tex (1966)
12. "Let A Soldier Drink" – Jerry Lee Lewis (1968)
13. "Buffalo Soldier" – Bob Marley & The Wailers (1983)
14. "The Forgotten Soldier Boy" – The Monroe Brothers (1936)
15. "Day After Tomorrow" – Tom Waits (2004)
16. "Bring the Boys Home" – Freda Payne (1971)
17. "Peace" – Los Lobos (1992)

=== Episode 8 (82): Fruit ===
First aired November 26, 2008

Fruit was an announced but unaired Season Two episode, and was probably recorded during that season, as Dylan refers to another Season Two show in his commentary, Trains.

Show track listings:

1. "Tutti Frutti" – Little Richard (1955)
2. "Peaches In The Springtime" – Memphis Jug Band (1928)
3. "Don't Squeeze The Peaches" – Jack Costanzo (Mr. Bongo) & Gerrie Woo (1968)
4. "Lemon 'N Ice" – Latin Playboys (1999)
5. "Cherry Oh Baby" – Eric Donaldson (1971)
6. "Where the Sweet Old Oranges Grow" – Sam Montgomery (1936)
7. "Cherry Pink and Apple Blossom White" – Perez Prado (1955)
8. "W-P-L-J" – The Four Deuces (1956)
9. "Strawberry Fields Forever" – The Beatles (1967)
10. "I'm Gonna Bring A Watermelon To My Girl Tonight" – The Savoy Havana Band (1924)
11. "Eatin' Watermelon" – Crown Prince Waterford (1949)
12. "Yes, We Have No Bananas" – Johnny Mercer and The Pied Pipers featuring June Hutton (1948)
13. "The Banana Boat Song (Day-O)" – Harry Belafonte (1957)
14. "Strange Fruit" – Billie Holiday (1939)

=== Episode 9 (83): Street Map ===
First aired December 3, 2008

Show track listings:

1. "14th Street" – Laura Cantrell (2005)
2. "Straight Street" – The Pilgrim Travelers (1955)
3. "Streets of Gold" – The Skatalites (excerpt)
4. "King of the Road" – Roger Miller (1965)
5. "Lonely Avenue" – Ray Charles (1956)
6. "Hit the Road, Jack" – Percy Mayfield (1961)
7. "Boulevard of Broken Dreams" – Green Day (2004)
8. "61 Highway" – Mississippi Fred McDowell (1959)
9. "Lost Highway" – Hank Williams (1949)
10. "Willin'" – Little Feat (1971)
11. "(Get Your Kicks on) Route 66" – Nat King Cole (1942)
12. "Route 90" – Clarence "Bon Ton" Garlow (1954)
13. "The Dark End of the Street" – Mud Boy and the Neutrons (1993)
14. "Going Down the Road Feeling Bad" – Woody Guthrie with Cisco Houston & Sonny Terry (1944)

=== Episode 10 (84): Famous People ===
First aired December 10, 2008

Show track listings:

1. "Jack Palance" – Mighty Sparrow (1956)
2. "My Boy Elvis" – Janis Martin (1956)
3. "Sweet Gene Vincent" – Ian Dury & the Blockheads (1977)
4. "Lee Van Cleef" – King Stitt (1969)
5. "Meet James Ensor" – They Might Be Giants (1994)
6. "Christopher Columbus" – Dinah Washington (1957)
7. "Hey Liberace!" – Charlie Adams (1953)
8. "The Beatles Got To Go" – Ken Lazarus & Keith Lyn (1966)
9. "Fate of Will Rogers & Wiley Post" – Bill Cox (ca. 1935)
10. "The Right Profile" – The Clash (1979)
11. "Jean Harlow" – Lead Belly (1944)
12. "So Long, Frank Lloyd Wright" – Simon & Garfunkel (1970)

=== Episode 11 (85): Numbers Eleven and Up ===
First aired December 17, 2008

Show track listings:

1. "36-22-36" – Bobby 'Blue' Bland (1962)
2. "30 Pieces Of Silver"" – Prince Buster (1964)
3. "Forty Days and Forty Nights" – Muddy Waters (1956)
4. "100,000 Women Can't Be Wrong" – Lattie Moore (1957)
5. "Girl Fifteen" – Floyd Dixon (1951)
6. "36 Inches High" – Jim Ford (1969)
7. "Ninety Nine" – Sonny Boy Williamson II (1957)
8. "54-46 Was My Number" – Toots & the Maytals (1969)
9. "39-21-46" – The Showmen (1967)
10. "Rocket 69" – Connie Allen with Todd Rhodes & His Orchestra (1952)
11. "A Man With One Million Dollars" – Joe Mooney Quartet (1947)
12. "99 Lbs." – Ann Peebles (1971)
13. "Three Hundred Pounds of Joy" – Howlin' Wolf (1966)
14. "12 Bar Blues" – NRBQ (1969)
15. "C'mon Sixty Five" – Merle Haggard (2007)

=== Episode 12: Christmas & New Year ===
Aired December 24, 2008 as a repeat of the Season 1 episode, which was first broadcast in December 2006.

=== Episode 13: Number One ===
Aired December 31, 2008, as a repeat of the Season 2 episode, which was first broadcast in January 2008.

=== Episode 14 (86): Work ===
First aired January 7, 2009

Show track listings:

1. "First, You've Got to Recognize God" – The Burnadettes (1963)
2. "Call It Stormy Monday (But Tuesday Is Just as Bad)" – T-Bone Walker (1947)
3. "Workin' Man Blues" – Merle Haggard (1969)
4. "Big Boss Man" – Jimmy Reed (1960)
5. "Nice Work If You Can Get It" – Sarah Vaughan (with Miles Davis) (1950)
6. "Payday" – Jesse Winchester (1970)
7. "Gotta Find a Job" – Lee Dorsey (1967)
8. "The Coat and the Pants Do All the Work" – Six Jumping Jacks (Harry Reser & His Orchestra with Tom Stacks (vocal)) (1926)
9. "I Can't Work No Longer" – Billy Butler & The Enchanters (1965)
10. "I'll Do Anything But Work" – Ray Charles (1950)
11. "Payday Blues" – Dan Hicks & His Hot Licks (1973)
12. "Want Ads" – Honey Cone (1971)
13. "Whistle While You Work" – Adriana Caselotti (1937)
14. "Call My Job" – Detroit Junior (1965)
15. "I Can't Wait To Get Off Work (and See My Baby on Montgomery Avenue)" – Tom Waits (1976)
16. "You Got to Have a Job (If You Don't Work, You Can't Eat)" – Marva Whitney & The J.B.'s (1969)

=== Episode 15 (87): Nothing ===
First aired January 14, 2009

Show track listing:

1. "Nothing" – The Fugs (1965)
2. "Don't Say Nothin' Bad (About My Baby)" – The Cookies (1963)
3. "There Is Nothing Like a Dame" – Sammy Davis Jr. (1963)
4. "Sweet Nothin's" – Brenda Lee (1959)
5. "I Got Plenty o' Nuttin'" – Frank Sinatra (1957)
6. "It's Nothing To Me" – Harry Johnson (Sanford Clark) (1967)
7. "Nothin' But the Wheel" – Peter Wolf (with Mick Jagger) (2002)
8. "No Love, No Nothin'" – Marlene Dietrich (1949)
9. "Nothing Takes The Place Of You" – Toussaint McCall (1967)
10. "I Ain't Got Nothin' but the Blues" – Mose Allison (1962)
11. "That Ain't Nothin' But Right" – Mac Curtis (1956)
12. "You Ain't Nothing But Fine" – Rockin' Sidney (1963)
13. "Nothin'" – Townes Van Zandt (1971)
14. "Oh! Sweet Nuthin'" – The Velvet Underground (1970) (Excerpt)

=== Episode 16 (88): Something ===
First aired January 21, 2009

Show track listing:

1. "Something" – The Beatles (1969)
2. "I'm into Something Good" – Earl-Jean McCrea (1964)
3. "Something's Coming!" – Vic Damone (1964)
4. "Do Something For Me" – Billy Ward and his Dominoes (with Clyde McPhatter, lead vocal) (1950)
5. "She's Got Something" – Jimmy Ballard (1952)
6. "This Could Be The Start Of Something Big" – Steve Allen (Background excerpt)
7. "He Was Really Sayin' Somethin'" – The Velvelettes (1964)
8. "Somethin' Else" – Eddie Cochran (1959)
9. "Something's Goin' On In My Room" – Daddy Cleanhead (1954)
10. "When Something Is Wrong With My Baby" – Charlie Rich (1966)
11. "Something Cool" – June Christy (with Pete Rugolo) (1953)
12. "There's Something On Your Mind Part 2" – Bobby Marchan (1960)
13. "Something Different" – The Carlisles (with Jumpin' Bill Carlisle) (1953)
14. "Something In The Air" – Thunderclap Newman (1969)

=== Episode 17 (89): Cats ===
First aired January 28, 2009

Show track listing:

1. "The Pink Panther Theme" – Brother Jack McDuff with the Big Band of Benny Golson
2. "Three Cool Cats" – The Coasters (1959)
3. "Tom Cat Blues" – Cliff Carlisle (1936)
4. "Leave My Kitten Alone" – Little Willie John (1959)
5. "I've Got a Tiger By the Tail" – Buck Owens and His Buckaroos (1964)
6. "Sell The Puss-y" – The Mighty Sparrow (1970)
7. "Put A Nickel In The Kitty" – Ocie Stockard & His Wanderers (1941)
8. "Dead Cats On The Line" – Tampa Red & Georgia Tom (1934)
9. "The Lion Sleeps Tonight" – The Tokens (1961)
10. "The Cat's Got The Measles, The Dog's Got The Whooping Cough" – Walter "Kid" Smith and Norman Woodlief (1929)
11. "A Fish House Function (For A Cross Eyed Cat Named Sam)" – Emmy Oro and Her Rhythm Escorts (1961)
12. "My Woman Has A Black Cat Bone" – Hop Wilson & His Buddies (1961)
13. "Stray Cat Blues" – The Rolling Stones (1968)
14. "The Theme From Top Cat" – Joseph Barbera (Hanna-Barbera Cartoons) (1961)

=== Episode 18 (90): Madness ===
First aired February 4, 2009

Show track listing:

1. "Crazy" – Patsy Cline (1961)
2. "I’m Nuts About Screwy Music" – Jimmie Lunceford and His Orchestra (1935)
3. "Nervous Breakdown" – Eddie Cochran (1961)
4. "I’ll Go Crazy" – James Brown and The Famous Flames (1960)
5. "Relaxin' at Camarillo" – Charlie Parker and Dizzy Gillespie (1947) (excerpt)
6. "Madness" – Prince Buster (1962)
7. "Manic Depression" – The Jimi Hendrix Experience (excerpt) (1967)
8. "You're Driving Me Crazy" – Peggy Lee (1949)
9. "Crackin’ Up" – Bo Diddley (1959)
10. "(Like Me) You’ll Recover in Time" – Johnny Paycheck (1967)
11. "Twisted" – Annie Ross (1952)
12. "I’m Going Crazy" – The Tibbs Brothers (1956)
13. "The Mad Bomber" – The Mighty Sparrow (excerpt) (1958)
14. "Crazy Mixed Up World" – Little Walter (1958)
15. "Blow Top Blues" – Dinah Washington (1952)
16. "The Rubber Room" – Porter Wagoner (1972)
17. "They're Coming to Take Me Away, Ha-Haaa!" – Napoleon XIV (excerpt) (1966)
18. "Hooray, Hooray, I’m Goin’ Away" – Beatrice Kay w/ Mitchell Ayres & His Orchestra (1947)
19. "It’s Fun to Be Livin’ in the Crazy House" – Redd Foxx (1957)
20. "Lost Mind" – Mose Allison (1957)
21. "Psycho" – Jack Kittel (1974)
22. "Frances Farmer Will Have Her Revenge on Seattle" – Nirvana (1993)

=== Episode 19 (91): Happiness ===
First aired February 11, 2009

Show track listing:

1. "Feelin' High and Happy" – Hot Lips Page (1938)
2. "Love and Happiness" – Al Green (1972)
3. "(I Wanna Go Where You Go) Then I'll Be Happy" – Jimmy Heap and The Melody Masters (1953)
4. "Happy Home" – Elmore James (1955)
5. "Happy" – The Rolling Stones (1972)
6. "I Want To Be Happy" – Ella Fitzgerald with Chick Webb & His Orchestra (1937)
7. "Happy" – Jenny Lewis with The Watson Twins (2006)
8. "You've Made Me So Very Happy" – Brenda Holloway (1967)
9. "Happy Rovin' Cowboy" – The Sons of the Pioneers (1935-36)
10. "Everybody's Happy Nowadays" – Buzzcocks (1979)
11. "Smile" – Judy Garland (1963) – (Music written by Charlie Chaplin, from the movie "Modern Times")
12. "Happy Trails" – Roy Rogers & Dale Evans with Frank Worth & His Orchestra (1950)

=== Episode 20 (92): Cops and Robbers ===
First aired February 18, 2009

Show track listing:

1. "Call The Police" – Nat King Cole Trio (1949)
2. "The Highway Patrol" – Red Simpson (1966)
3. "Dupree Blues" – Blind Willie Walker (1930)
4. "Against Th' Law" – Billy Bragg & Wilco (1998)
5. "I Fought The Law" – The Crickets (1959)
6. "This Crooked World" – Freddie "Bama Boy" Hall and His Gadsden Band (1954)
7. "Poor Jesse James" – Bascom Lamar Lunsford (1949)
8. "Pretty Boy Floyd" – The Byrds (1968)
9. "Bad Detective" – The Coasters (1963)
10. "La Muerte De Fred Gómez Carrasco" – Los Socios De San Antonio (1974)
11. "Police on My Back" – The Equals (1967)
12. "Dirty People" – Smiley Lewis (1950)
13. "I'm a Lonesome Fugitive" – Merle Haggard (1966)

=== Episode 21 (93): Sugar and Candy ===
First aired February 25, 2009

Show track listing:

1. "The Honeydripper" – Joe Liggins and The Honeydrippers (1945)
2. "Shake Sugaree" – Elizabeth Cotten & Brenda Evans (1965)
3. "Sugar Magnolia" – The Grateful Dead (1970)
4. "My Boy Lollipop" – Millie Small (1964)
5. "Sugar Coated Love" – Lazy Lester (1958)
6. "Stealin' Sugar" – Ray Batts (1954)
7. "Sugar Town" – Lara & The Trailers (1966)
8. "If Sugar Was As Sweet As You" – Joe Tex (1966)
9. "I Want Candy" – The Strangeloves (1965)
10. "The Big Rock Candy Mountains" – Harry "Haywire Mac" McClintock (1928)
11. "Candy" – The Astors (1965)
12. "So Like Candy" – Elvis Costello (1991)
13. "Sugar Bee" – Cleveland Crochet (1961)
14. "Candy Man" – Dave Van Ronk (1964)

=== Episode 22 (94): Questions ===
First aired March 4, 2009

Show track listing:

1. "Who Do You Love? – Bo Diddley (1959)
2. "Whadaya Want? – The Robins (1955)
3. "What Do You Want the Girl to Do? – Allen Toussaint (1975)
4. "When Will I Be Loved? – The Everly Brothers (1959)
5. "Where You At? – Lloyd Price (1953)
6. "I Wonder Where You Are Tonight – Bill Monroe & his Bluegrass Boys (1967)
7. "$64,000 Question (Do You Love Me?) – Bobby Tuggle (1955)
8. "Who's That Guy? – The Kolettes (1964)
9. "Who's That Lady? – The Isley Brothers (1964)
10. "How Can I Miss You When You Won't Go Away? – Dan Hicks & his Hot Licks (1969)
11. "What's Going On – Marvin Gaye (1971)
12. "The Old Philosopher" – Eddie Lawrence (1956)
13. "What Is This Thing Called Love?" – Billie Holiday (1945)
14. "(What's So Funny 'Bout) Peace, Love and Understanding?" – Brinsley Schwarz (1974)

=== Episode 23 (95): Truth and Lies ===
First aired March 11, 2009

Show track listing:

1. "Tell A Lie" – The Chromatics (1955)
2. "Don't Play That Song" – Aretha Franklin (1970)
3. "Don't Lie To Me" – Fats Domino (1951)
4. "True Blue Papa" – Leon Chappel (1950)
5. "How Much I've Lied" – Gram Parsons (1973)
6. "Twenty Five Lies" – Guitar Slim (1954)
7. "Your True Love" – Carl Perkins (1957)
8. "I'll Be True" – Faye Adams (1954)
9. "True Confession" – Duke Reid & The Silvertones (1966)
10. "He Lied" – Willie Mabon (1955)
11. "It's Only Make Believe" – Conway Twitty (1958)
12. "It Was A Lie" – Bobby Moore & The Fourmost (1964)
13. "La-La-La-Lies" – The Who (1966)

=== Episode 24 (96): Family ===
First aired March 18, 2009

Show track listing:

1. "I'm My Own Grandpa" – Lonzo and Oscar (1948)
2. "Aunt Caroline Dyer Blues" – Memphis Jug Band (1931)
3. "Two Sisters" – Clannad (1976)
4. "Shame and Scandal (In The Family)" – Peter Tosh & The Wailers (1965)
5. "I Wish I Could Shimmy Like My Sister Kate" – The Olympics (1960)
6. "Little Sister" – Elvis Presley (1961)
7. "LA Women Love Uncle Bud" – Boozoo Chavis (1987)
8. "Second Cousin" – The Flamin' Groovies (1970)
9. "Brother John" – The Wild Tchoupitoulas (1976)
10. "A Better Son/Daughter" – Rilo Kiley (2002)
11. "The Seventh Son" – Willie Mabon (1955)
12. "Bring it On Home to Grandma" – Cliff Bruner & His Texas Wanderers (1938)
13. "Family Affair" – Sly & The Family Stone (1971)
14. "Will the Circle Be Unbroken?" – Jimmy Martin (1981)

=== Episode 25 (97): Noah's Ark: Part 1 ===
First aired March 25, 2009

Show track listing:

1. "King of Kings" – Jimmy Cliff (1963)
2. "Ground Hog" – Cousin Emmy with Frank Moore and His Log Cabin Boys
3. "Grizzly Bear" – Cousin Emmy with Frank Moore and His Log Cabin Boys Rolf Cahn & Eric Von Schmidt
4. "The Monkey Speaks His Mind" – Dave Bartholomew
5. "Rattlesnake Daddy" – Joe D. Johnson
6. "Too Many Fish in the Sea" – The Marvelettes (1964)
7. "Hold That Critter Down" – Sons of the Pioneers
8. "Baby Mine" – Bonnie Raitt
9. "Tie Me Kangaroo Down, Sport" – Rolf Harris (1960, 1963)
10. "Froggy Went A Courtin'" – Tex Ritter
11. "Barnyard Boogie" – Louis Jordan & His Tympany Five
12. "Will The Wolf Survive?" – Waylon Jennings (1986)
13. "Fattening Frogs for Snakes" – Sonny Boy Williamson II
14. "Jollity Farm" – Leslie Sarony with Jack Hylton & His Orchestra (1929)
15. "Animal Farm" – The Kinks (1968)

=== Episode 26 (98): Noah's Ark: Part 2 ===
First aired April 1, 2009

Show track listing:

1. "They All Ask'd for You (The Audobon [sic] Zoo Song)" – The Meters
2. "There's a Moose on the Loose" – Roddy Jackson
3. "White Rabbit" – Jefferson Airplane
4. "Carried Water For The Elephant" – Leroy Carr & Scrapper Blackwell
5. "Simon Smith and the Amazing Dancing Bear" – Randy Newman
6. "Fox on the Run" – The Country Gentlemen
7. "See-Line Woman" – Nina Simone
8. "Coyote" – Joni Mitchell (1976)
9. "Possum Song" – Johnny Mercer with Paul Weston and his Orchestra
10. "Monkey Man" – The Maytals
11. "Bert the Turtle (The Duck and Cover Song)" – Dick 'Two Ton' Baker
12. "Calling All Cows" – Lazy Bill Lucas & the Blues Rockers
13. "Black Rat Swing" – Memphis Minnie and Little Son Joe
14. "On the Wings of a Snow White Dove" – Ferlin Husky
15. "United We Stand" – Bob and Marcia

=== Episode 27 (99): Clearance Sale ===
First aired April 8, 2009

Show track listing:

1. "Little Sadie" – Clarence Ashley
2. "Bon Ton Roula" – Clarence Garlow
3. "You Got to Go to Work" – Rex Griffin
4. "When You're Smiling" – Billie Holiday with Teddy Wilson & His Orchestra
5. "Ain't Got No Home" – Clarence 'Frogman' Henry
6. "Big Balls In Cowtown" (We'll Dance Around) – Bob Wills & His Texas Playboys
7. "My Evolution Girl" – Walter 'Kid' Smith
8. "Copperhead Road" – Steve Earle
9. "End of the Road" – Jerry Lee Lewis
10. "Raglan Road" – Van Morrison & The Chieftains
11. "Bury Me Beneath the Willow" – Clarence White & Roger Bush
12. "Son of a Preacher Man" – Dusty Springfield
13. "A Nickel and A Nail" – O.V. Wright
14. "Somebody's In My Orchard" – Anita Harris
15. "Boogie Uproar" – Clarence 'Gatemouth' Brown
16. "Rock of Gibraltar" – Big Joe Turner
17. "Strut That Thing" – Cripple Clarence Lofton
18. "Bing Crosby" – The Lion
19. "Jerry Lewis in France" – Ben Vaughn Combo
20. "You're Nothing But a Nothin' – Jimmy Heap & The Melody Masters
21. "You Can't Miss Nothing That You Never Had" – Ike & Tina Turner
22. "Go Through Sunday" – Jim Ford
23. "Too Weak to Fight" – Clarence Carter
24. "Fujiyama Mama" – Annisteen Allen
25. "Fujiyama Mama" – Wanda Jackson
26. "15" – Rilo Kiley
27. "Mean Eyed Cat" – Johnny Cash
28. "Fools Are Not Born" – Clarence Reid
29. "Candy Man" – Mississippi John Hurt
30. "Sugar Sugar" – The Wailers
31. "Bad Boy" – Clarence Palmer & the Jive Bombers
32. "'Round Midnight" – Betty Carter
33. "Let it Bleed" – The Rolling Stones

=== Episode 28 (100): Goodbye ===
First aired April 15, 2009

Show track listing:

1. "Goodbye Baby" – Elmore James
2. "Goodbye Sweet Liza Jane" – Charlie Poole
3. "Go Now" – Bessie Banks
4. "The Leaving Of Liverpool" – The Clancy Brothers
5. "Adios Senorita" – The Ovations
6. "(If It Don't Work Out) Then You Can Tell Me Goodbye" – Slim Smith
7. "Vaya Con Dios" – Les Paul and Mary Ford
8. "If This Is Goodbye" – Mark Knopfler and Emmylou Harris
9. "Goodbye Baby" – Little Caesar
10. "So Long, Good Luck and Goodbye" – Weldon Rogers and The Teen Kings
11. "Let's Say Goodnight" – Los Lobos
12. "Troubles Goodbye" – Jimmy Liggins
13. "Go and Say Goodbye" – Buffalo Springfield
14. "Splogham" – Slim Gaillard
15. "See You Later Alligator" – Bobby Charles
16. "Much Later For You Baby" – Jackie Brenston
17. "So Long, I'm Gone" – Warren Smith
18. "Bye Bye, Fare Thee Well" – Peppermint Harris
19. "Jamaica Farewell" – Jamaican Duke
20. "I'm Checkin' Out Go'om Bye" – Ivie Anderson and Duke Ellington
21. "Goodnight Irene" – Lead Belly
22. "So Long" – Lee Dorsey
23. "Dusty Old Dust (So Long, It's Been Good To Know You)" – Woody Guthrie (1940)
