= April Fool's Day (disambiguation) =

April Fools' Day is a notable day celebrated on April 1, when many people play practical jokes and hoaxes on each other.

April Fool's Day or April Fools' Day may also refer to:

- April Fools' Day (1954 film), a 1954 French film
- April Fool's Day (1986 film), a 1986 horror film directed by Fred Walton
  - April Fool's Day (2008 film), a remake of this film
- April Fool's Day, the original title of the horror film Slaughter High (1986)
- April Fool's Day, a 1997 TV film starring Bill Bailey
- April Fool's Day (novel), 1993 novel by Bryce Courtnay
- "April Fool's Day" (Hey Arnold), an episode of Hey Arnold
- "April Fool's Day" (Roseanne), an episode of Roseanne

== See also ==
- April Fool (disambiguation)
- Fool's Day (disambiguation)
- April Fools' Day Request for Comments
- "Fools in April", an episode of SpongeBob SquarePants
- All Fools Day (album), a 1985 album by the Saints
- April 1 Vidudala, a 1991 Indian film by Vamsy
