= Boozoo Chavis (album) =

Studio album by Boozoo Chavis
- Released: 1991
- Genre: Zydeco
- Label: Elektra/Nonesuch
- Producer: Terry Adams

Boozoo Chavis chronology
Zydeco Trail Ride (1990)	Boozoo Chavis (1991)	Boozoo's Breakdown (1991)

Boozoo Chavis is an album by the American musician Boozoo Chavis, released in 1991. It was part of the Elektra/Nonesuch American Explorer series. The album was the culmination of a comeback for Chavis that had begun in 1984. Chavis supported the album by playing the Newport Folk Festival.

== Production ==
Boozoo Chavis was produced by Terry Adams; Adams and NRBQ had recorded a song titled "Boozoo, That's Who!" The album was recorded in Louisiana over the course of four days, a long period of studio time for a Chavis album. Two of Chavis's sons played on the album; Chavis's band used rubboard, bass, two guitars, and drums. Chavis did not always enjoy recording in a professional studio setting, even though Adams took a hands-off approach. Chavis performed a few solo numbers with just his accordion and vocals.

Chavis first recorded some of the songs, such as "Tee Black", in the 1950s. On "Forty One Days", he acknowledges his sometimes shaky sense of cadence: "If it's wrong, do it wrong." "Bernadette" is performed as a ballad. "Dog Hill" is about Chavis's neighborhood in Lake Charles, Louisiana. Chavis sang some songs in a French-English dialect.

== Critical reception ==
Professional ratings
Review scores
Source	Rating
AllMusic	2.5/5 stars
Calgary Herald	B
Entertainment Weekly	B−
Houston Chronicle	4.5/5 stars
MusicHound World: The Essential Album Guide	4/5 stars

Entertainment Weekly wrote that Chavis's "shuffling snare drum is a mark of an authentic (even exemplary) excursion into zydeco." The Austin American-Statesman noted that the production "gives the music the benefit of modern studio clarity without diminishing the rough-hewn immediacy that makes it sizzle." The Calgary Herald concluded: "This is zydeco music without any of the slickness that has affected it in recent years, but with all the infectious joy that the music brings to listeners."

The New York Times stated that "the tempos shuffle and jive, the melodies swagger; it's pure and primitive, with just a hint of down-home blues." The Vancouver Sun deemed the album "a must for zydeco fans," writing that "he's got a knack for hilarious song titles ... is a masterful accordion player and can whoop it up with the best of them." The Fort Worth Star-Telegram opined: "The difference between Chavis and many of his contemporaries, however, is how well he works within the rather limited boundaries of zydeco; he constantly varies the tempos and instrumentation, and his accordion lines are much more interesting than the usual easygoing zydeco oom-pah."

AllMusic wrote that "the call and response can get a bit overly burdensome in the slow numbers, but there's an element of the rural sounds of zydeco throughout."

== Track listing ==
No.	Title	Length
1.	"Boozoo's Theme Song"
2.	"I'm Ready Me"
3.	"Dog Hill"
4.	"Keep Your Dress Tail Down"
5.	"Johnnie Billy Goat"
6.	"Gilton"
7.	"Goin' to La Maison"
8.	"Forty One Days"
9.	"Oh Yae Yae"
10.	"Tee Black"
11.	"Zydeco Hee Haw"
12.	"Don't Worry About Boozoo"
13.	"Bernadette"
