= Allons à Lafayette =

Song performed by Joe Falcon

"Allons à Lafayette (Lafayette)"

Single by Joe Falcon
- A-side: "La valse qui m'a porter à ma fosse"
- Recorded: April 27, 1928
- Genre: Cajun
- Length: 2:55
- Label: Columbia Records 15275-D, Okeh Records 90018
- Songwriter(s): Traditional

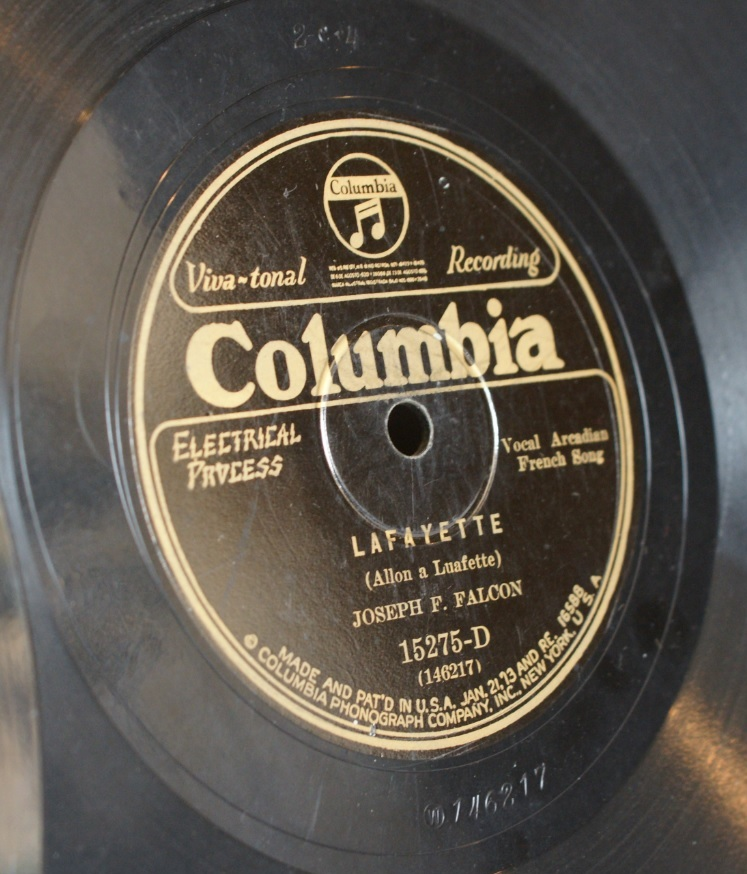
Columbia Records. "Lafayette (Allon a Luafette)"

"Allons à Lafayette" is the B-side of a 78rpm single recorded by Joe Falcon and Cléoma Breaux in 1928. The song is based on an older traditional tune called "Jeunes gens campagnard". While there is some mystery on the reason Okeh Records didn't release Dr. James F. Roach's songs in 1925, "Allons à Lafayette" is officially known as the first commercial Cajun song to be recorded. It was included in the reference book "1001 Songs You Must Hear Before You Die."

== Content ==
The song deals with a man asking his partner to go to Lafayette, Louisiana and change her name to something more scandalous, Mrs. Mischievous Comeaux. The singer is upset they are both far apart and thinks her beauty is far better than her character.

== Lyrics ==
Cajun French

Allons à Lafayette, c'est pour changer ton nom.
On va t’appeler Madame, Madame Canaille Comeaux.
Petite, t’es trop mignonne pour faire ta criminelle.
Comment tu crois que moi, je peux faire comme ça tout seul.
Mais toi, mon joli Coeur, regarde donc ce que t’as fait.
Je suis si loin de toi, mais ça, ça m' fait pitié
Petite, t’es trop mignonne pour faire ta criminelle.
Observe moi bien mignonne, tu vas voir par toi même.
Que moi je n'mérite pas c'que t'es en train d' faire.
Pourquoi tu fais tout ça, c'est bien pour m'faire fâcher!

English

Let's go to Lafayette, to change your name.
We will call you Mrs. Mischievous Comeaux.
Honey, you're too pretty to act like a tramp.
How do you think I am going to manage without you?
But you, my pretty heart, look at what you've done.
We are so far apart and that is pitiful.
Honey, you're too pretty to act like a tramp.
Look at me honey, you will see yourself
that I do not deserve what you are doing.
Why are you doing all this, clearly to make me angry.

== Versions ==
Several musicians recorded the song. After 1957, Randy and The Rockets released the swamp pop song "Lets Do the Cajun Twist" using the same theme and melody.

In 1990, a version by Dutch band Captain Gumbo reached No. 30 in the official Dutch music singles chart.
