= Max-Him =

- Genres: Italo disco
- Past members: Florian Fadinger; Mauro Farina; Giuliano Crivellente; Romano Trevisani; Guido Felicani; Massimo Vaccari

Max-Him was an Italo disco project fronted by Florian Fadinger (May 6, 1960 – January 16, 2013), the former manager of German DJ/producer Sven Väth. All of the singing on Max-Him's albums was allegedly done by Italian musician Massimo Vaccari, whilst Fadinger was the public image.

In 1985, Max-Him reached the No. 21 position in Germany with the song "Lady Fantasy".

Fadinger died on January 16, 2013, in Munich, Germany from unknown causes. He left behind a wife and six children. His body was cremated on January 24, 2013; He was buried the same day.

== Discography ==
=== Albums ===
- Danger Danger (1986)

=== Singles ===
- "Roadhouse Blues" (1983)
- "No Escape" (1984)
- "Lady Fantasy" (1985) — GER No. 21
- "Japanese Girl" (1985) — GER No. 45
- "Melanie" (1986)
- "Danger, Danger" (1986)
- "Just a Love Affair" (1987)
- "Lady Fantasy 2003" (2003)
