= Joe Falcon =

American accordionist (1900–1965)

Joe Falcón
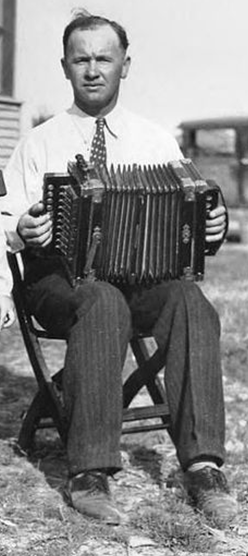
- Joe Falcón in 1934

Background information
- Born: Joseph Falcón; September 28, 1900; Roberts Cove, Louisiana, United States
- Died: November 19, 1965 (aged 65) Crowley, Louisiana
- Genres: Cajun
- Occupations: Musician, Accordionist
- Instruments: Vocals, Accordion
- Labels: Columbia, Okeh, Bluebird, Decca, Cajun Classics, Arhoolie

Joseph Falcón (September 28, 1900 – November 19, 1965) was an accordion player from southwest Louisiana, best known for producing the first recording of a Cajun song, "Allons à Lafayette," in 1928. He and his wife Cléoma Breaux left for New Orleans to record the first Cajun record and went on to perform across southern Louisiana and Texas.

== Early life ==
Joe was born in Roberts Cove, Louisiana located nearby Bayou Plaquemine Brule and began playing accordion at the age of seven. He was the fifth child of Pierre Illaire Falcón and Marie Arvilia Boudreaux. His family farmed cotton and sugarcane, and they made syrup. He shares both Cajun and Isleño ancestry as his paternal great-grandparents, José Félix Falcón and María Antonia Damasa Falcón, were descendants of the Canary Islander colonists who settled in Valenzuela along Bayou Lafourche. His ancestors Cristóbal Falcón and Gaspar Falcón were born in Telde, Gran Canaria. His mother Marie was of Acadian descent.

== Music career ==
His career as a professional musician began some years later at a fais-do-do hall called the "Blue Goose" (Oneziphore Guidry's dance hall) in Rayne, Louisiana when the regular band didn't show up and the dance hall owner insisted that Joe take their place.

As a young man, Joe was friends with accordionist Amédée Breaux of the legendary Breaux family and sometimes accompanied him on triangle. Amédée's sister, Cléoma, a gifted guitarist and singer, became Joe's frequent accompanist and they married not long after the onset of their recording career.

In April 1928, a jeweler from Rayne, Louisiana and native New Orleanian, George Burrow, persuaded Columbia records to record Joe and his wife Cléoma and their friend, Leon Meche, by agreeing to purchase 500 records. However, in the hotel recording studio, Meche backed down; scared he would mess up the recording. Joe stepped up and sang instead. In a 1962 interview with Mike Seeger, Columbia executive, Frank Buckley Walker, recalls recording the duo:

So I went up to Lafayette for a weekend. I happened to know something of the story of the Cajuns and was astounded at the interest that there was in their little Saturday night dances. A single singer would have a little concertina-type instrument and a one-string fiddle and a triangle, those were the instruments, but they would always have a singer and of course they sang in Cajun. And to me it had a funny sound. So I brought down a little group. I think his name was Joe Falcon. I brought him down to New Orleans, and we recorded just to have something different. We put it on the market, and it had tremendous sales.

Recorded on April 27, 1928, in New Orleans, "Lafayette" caused a sensation when it was released by Columbia Records in the summer of 1928. Thousands of copies were sold and Falcón became the first Cajun-recording star, playing to packed dance halls in Louisiana and neighboring Texas. Joe and Cleoma recorded more material at sessions in New York City in August 1928 and Atlanta in April 1929. After a hiatus caused by the onset of the Great Depression, the couple resumed their recording career in 1934, recording again in New York, then at New Orleans in 1936 and San Antonio in 1937. Cléoma died suddenly on April 9, 1941, but Joe continued to perform as leader of Joe Falcon and His Silver Bell String Band, which included his second wife, Theresa Meaux, on drums.

Despite this success, Joe's career flagged in the late 1930s with the increasing popularity of fiddle-based country-and-western influenced bands. His music came to be considered old-fashioned and he stopped recording after his last session in 1937. Though Joe continued to play local dances into the 1960s, he declined to make further recordings, maintaining he had been cheated by record companies. His final recording session was a live performance in 1963 at the Triangle Club in Scott, Louisiana; he died two years later in Crowley, Louisiana at the age of 65.

- Allons a Lafayette Listen (MP3)
- Madame Sosthene Listen (MP3)
- La Valse Crowley Listen (MP3)

== Discography ==
- "Allons à Lafayette"/"Waltz That Carried Me To My Grave" (Columbia 15275-D, Okeh 90018) April 27, 1928 in New Orleans, LA
- "Fe Fe Poncheaux" / "Le Vieux Soulard Et Sa Femme (The Old Drunkard And His Wife)" (Columbia 15301-D) August 27, 1928 in New York, NY.
- "A Cowboy Rider" / "Marie Buller" (Columbia 40502-F, Okeh 90002) August 27, 1928 in New York, NY.
- "Vieux Airs (Old Tunes)" / "La Marche De La Noce (Wedding March)" (Columbia 15325-D) August 27, 1928 in New York, NY.
- "Prenez Courage (Take Courage)" / "Quand Je Suis Partis Pour Le Texas(Columbia 40503-F, Okeh 90003) April 18, 1929 in Atlanta, GA.
- "C'Est Si Triste Sans Lui (It Is So Blue Without Him)" / "Elle M'A Oublie (She Has Forgotten Me)" (Columbia 40508-F, Okeh 90008) April 18, 1929 in Atlanta, GA.
- "Poche Town" / "Ossun" (Columbia 40506-F, Okeh 90006) April 18, 1929 in Atlanta, GA.
- "Madame Sosten" / "Mes Yeux Bleus" (Decca Records 17000)
- "Joseph Falcon: Cajun Music Pioneer" (Arhoolie ARHO 970459, 1963)
- "Jai Passe Devant Ta Porte" / "Corrina Corrina" (Crazy Cajun Records 514)
- "La Jolie Fille N'en Veut Plus de Moi" / "Ne Buvez Plus Jamais" (Decca Records)
- "Pas La Belle De Personne Que Moi (Nobody's Darling But Mine)" / "Jeuste Parcque (Just Because)" (Decca Records 17015, March 12, 1936)
- "Je Suis Laissee Seule" / "Blues de Leebou" (Decca Records 17057, December 15, 1937)

=== Compilations ===
- "Joseph Falcon And His Silver Bell String Band - Louisiana Cajun Music" (F 5005 Arhoolie, 1968)
- "Pioneers of Cajun Accordion 1926-1936" (LPOT128 Old Timey / Arhoolie, 1989)
- "Cajun Vol. 1 - Abbeville Breakdown: 1929-1939" (CK 46220 Columbia Records, 1990)
- "Cajun Dance Party: Fais Do-Do" (CK 46784 Columbia Legacy, 1994)
- "Joe Falcon - Cajun Music Pioneer" (CD 459 Arhoolie, 1997)
- "Cajun: Early Recordings" (JSP7726 JSP, 2004)
- "Cajun - Rare & Authentic" (JSPCD77115 JSP, 2008)

== Photographs ==
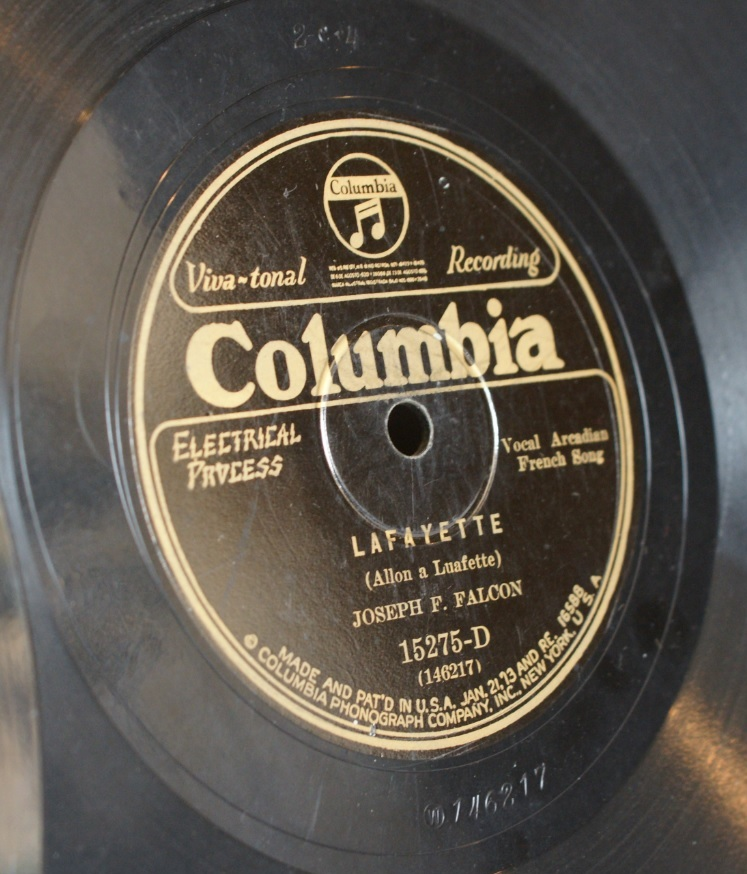
Columbia Records. "Lafayette (Allon a Luafette)"

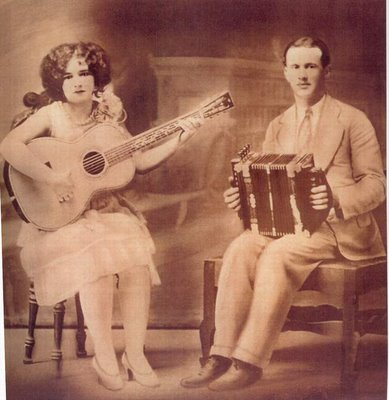
Joe and Cleoma after recording in New Orleans

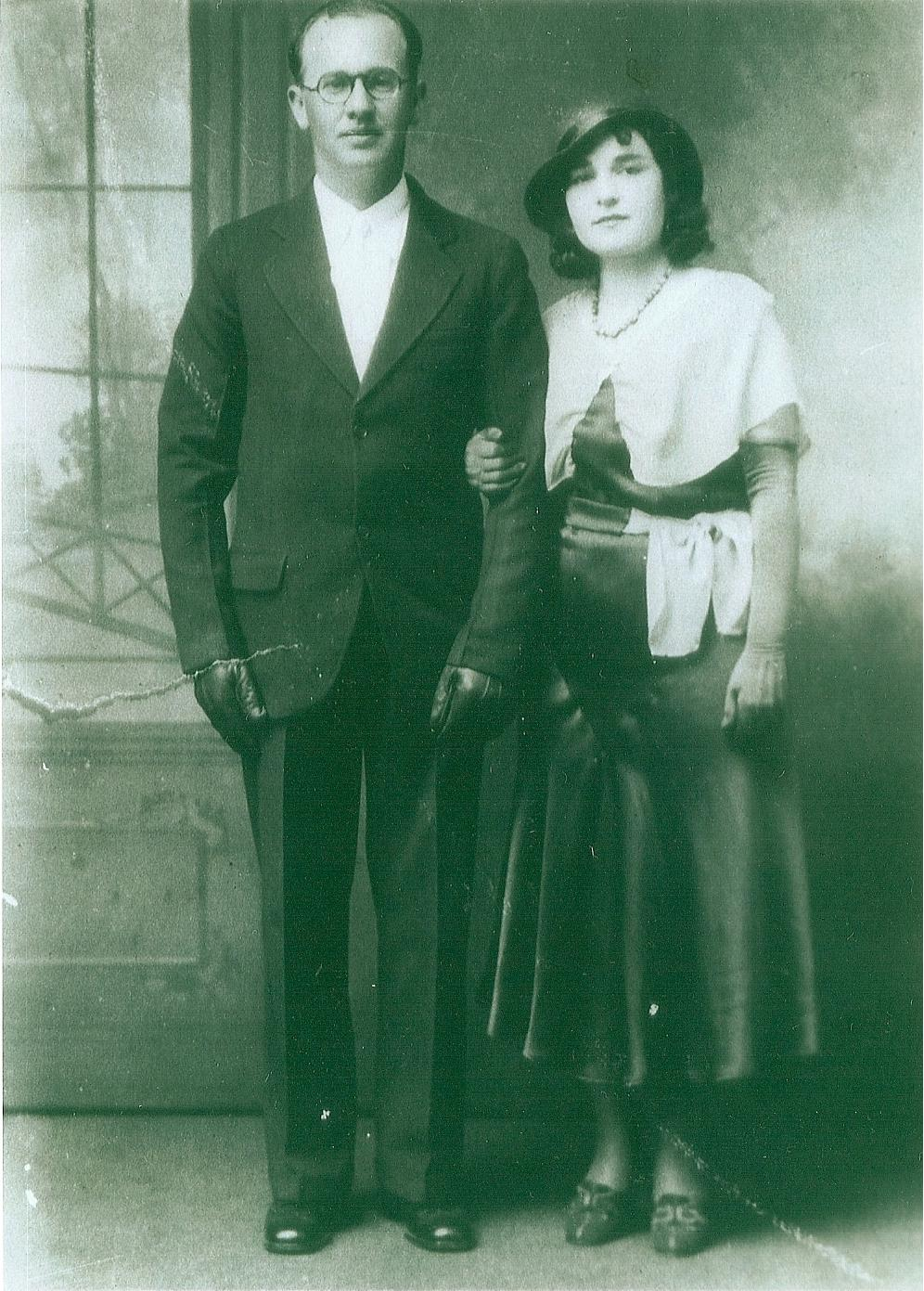
Joe Falcón and Cléoma Breaux on their wedding day April 27th, 1932

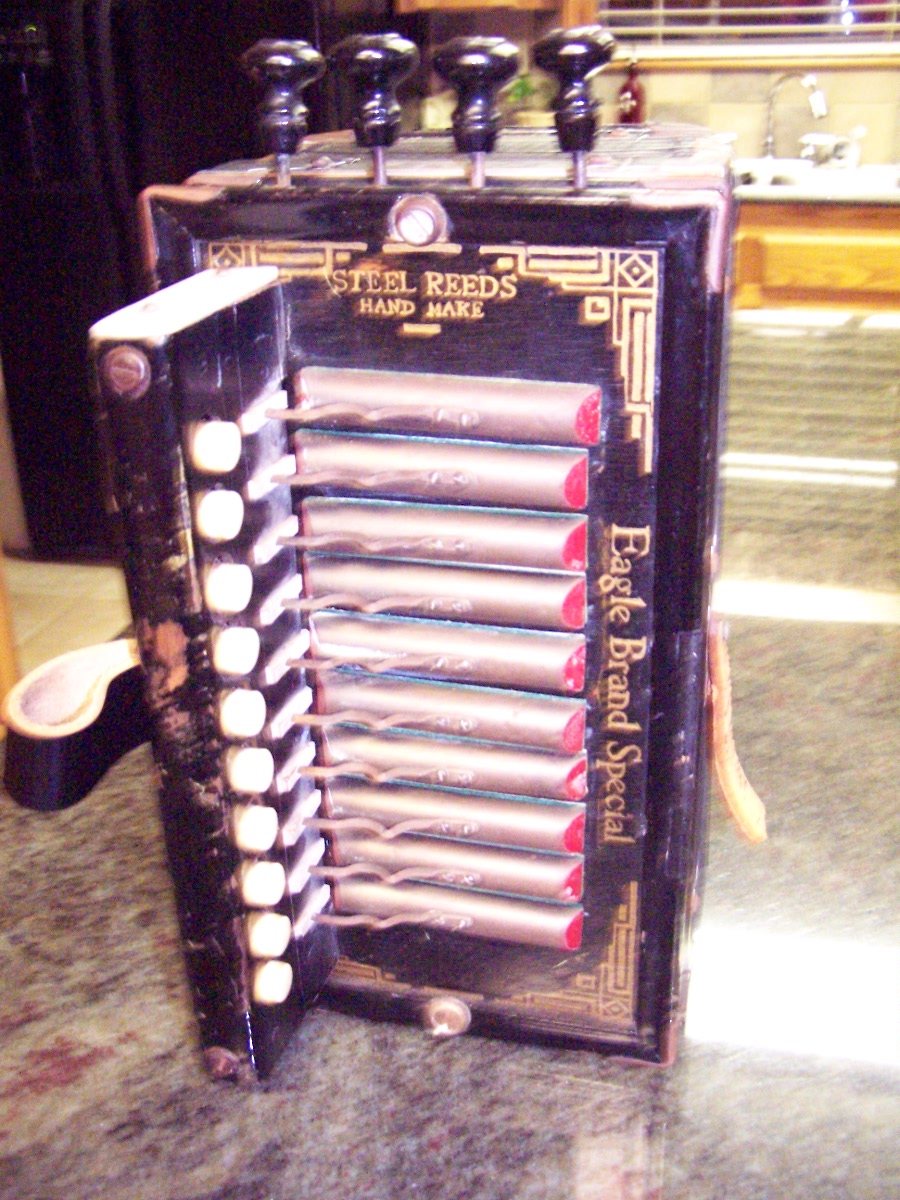
Joe Falcón's last accordion, a pre-WWII German "Eagle" brand.

== See also ==
- List of people related to Cajun music
- History of Cajun music
- Isleños
- Canarian Americans
