= Lloyd Clarke =

Jamaican ska musician

Lloyd Clarke is a Jamaican ska musician. He had a series of hits in the early 1960s. "Japanese Girl" was featured on Theme Time Radio Hour (season 2).

== Singles ==
- "Fool's Day"
- "You're a Cheat"
- "Love You the Most"
- "Japanese Girl" (1963)
- "Girl Rush"
- "ParapintoBoogie"
