= Boozoo Chavis =

American zydeco musician (1930–2001)

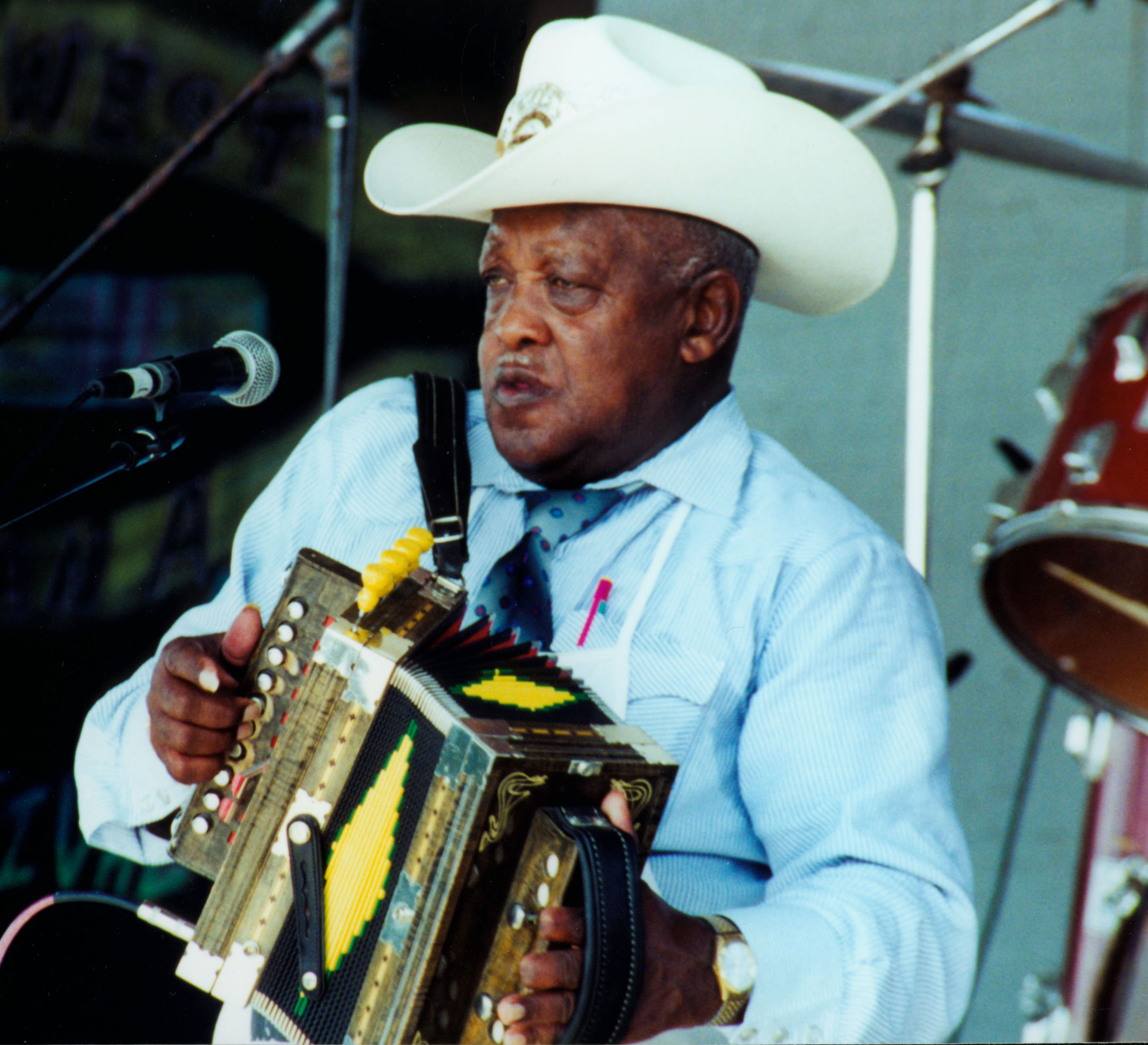
- Chavis at the 2000 Original Southwest Zydeco Festival

Background information
- Born: Wilson Anthony Chavis; October 23, 1930; Lake Charles, Louisiana, U.S.
- Died: May 5, 2001 (aged 70) Austin, Texas, U.S.
- Genres: Zydeco
- Occupations: Musician, accordionist, singer, songwriter
- Instruments: Cajun accordion, vocals
- Years active: 1954–2001
- Labels: Goldband, Maison de Soul, Elektra, Rounder, Sonet

Wilson Anthony "Boozoo" Chavis (pronounced CHAY-viss) (October 23, 1930 – May 5, 2001) was an American accordion player, singer, songwriter and bandleader. He was one of the pioneers of zydeco, the fusion of Louisiana Creole and blues music developed in southwest Louisiana.

== Early life ==
Chavis was born to parents Arthur and Marceline Chavis in a Creole settlement called Pied des Chiens (Dog Hill), in Lake Charles, Louisiana. He was the son of tenant farmers, and acquired the nickname "Boozoo" in his childhood, although the origin of the nickname is unknown. When asked by a reporter about his nickname, Chavis replied "Man, I hate that question".

Accounts vary as to when and how Chavis obtained his first accordion. A Living Blues magazine story says that at age 9, he traded a small riding horse for his first accordion, a little single-row model, and taught himself to play. An article in OffBeat Magazine claims that Chavis bought his first accordion with money earned from riding in a horse race when he was a teenager; similarly, Sing Out! claims that he bought the accordion at 13 with horse race bet winnings. He was exposed to music within his family; his father, some uncles and cousins all played accordion. His great uncle was Sidney Babineaux, a popular accordionist from Rayne who played in the "La La" style. Boozoo played washboard and harmonica prior to obtaining his first accordion, and his father taught him early accordion lessons. Chavis credits his mother as being especially enterprising, as she took on cleaning jobs and selling barbeque at informal horse races to raise extra money, with which she bought three acres of land. When he was 14, the Chavis family moved "across the highway".

Later, Chavis bought a button accordion and began performing regularly at a dance club that his mother opened, often sitting in on performances with Clifton Chenier, his father, Morris Chenier, and brother, Cleveland Chenier. Chavis also played music as a side job at house dances on weekends and evenings. As well as developing the playing style that came to be known as zydeco, Chavis worked as a farmer, jockey, and horse trainer.

== Career ==
=== First era: 1950s ===
Chavis made his first recording in 1955, "Paper in My Shoe", based on a song he heard performed by Creole accordionist Ambrose "Potato" Sam. Chavis's version was an uptempo tune with a dance beat about being too poor to afford new shoes or socks, so he placed a paper in his shoes to keep his feet warm when the holes in the sole got too large. The song, sung in both French and English, was originally released on the Folk-Star label, a subsidiary of Goldband, before being reissued by Imperial Records. This recording was among the first commercially released zydeco songs and a regional hit, and was subsequently acknowledged as a zydeco standard. The song was recorded at the instigation of local entrepreneur Eddie Shuler, who teamed Chavis up with a rhythm and blues band named Classie Ballou's Tempo Kings. The first recording session was not successful, so Shuler brought whiskey in for subsequent takes, and the band lost their inhibitions. An inebriated Chavis fell off of his chair at the end of the released version of "Paper in My Shoe", so the song fades out, which was one of the first records to use that technique. Chavis denied this widely shared anecdote.

Chavis was convinced that the recording was more successful than the record companies claimed, later saying: "I got gypped out of my record. I get frustrated, sometimes. I love to play, but, when I get to thinking about 1955... They stole my record. They said that it only sold 150,000 copies. But, my cousin, who used to live in Boston, checked it out. It sold over a million copies. I was supposed to have a gold record." As a result, Chavis lost trust in the music business, and over the next thirty years only released three more singles: "Forty-One Day's" (Folk-Star 1201, 1955), "Hamburger's & Popcorn" (Goldband 1161, 1965), and "Mama! Can I Come Home" (Crazy Cajun 813, 1974 [credited to the Dog Hill Playhouse Band]). He found difficulty booking gigs without steady record releases.

He performed rarely during the 1960s and 1970s, except for friends and family events, devoting most of his time to farming and raising racehorses on his property in Dog Hill, on the outskirts of Lake Charles, Louisiana. The area derived its name because it is where people traditionally went to dump unwanted pets. During those years, zydeco's popularity was limited mainly to Louisiana. By the early 1980s however, zydeco was gaining recognition outside of Louisiana in the United States, as well developing as a strong following in Europe, thanks largely to the popularity of artists such as Clifton Chenier, Buckwheat Zydeco, and Rockin' Dopsie. Those artists were performing as main attractions at music festivals, were included in magazine stories, and were getting the attention of major record labels.

=== Second era: 1984–2001 ===
In the early 1980s, Chavis was making a meager living with his race horses, and earned only a small amount of money performing at occasional house parties or dances. Chavis's family, and in particular his wife Leona, encouraged him to resume his music career. Chavis returned to performing music regularly in 1984 after discovering that another musician was impersonating him. He and his wife were driving to a horse race and heard an advertisement on the radio for a dance featuring Boozoo Chavis, after which he realized that there was enough name recognition for him to return to performing.

He signed a five-year contract with the Maison de Soul label, and released a locally successful single, "Dog Hill" (on the ZBC label) and four albums: Louisiana Zydeco Music (1986), Boozoo Zydeco! (1987), Zydeco Homebrew (1989), and Zydeco Trail Ride (1990). Louisiana Zydeco Music included a re-recording of "Paper In My Shoe" that was included on many jukeboxes in Louisiana and became a regional hit for a second time. These four albums were frequently played on local zydeco radio shows. In addition, Rounder Records released a live album Zydeco Live! in 1989, and a compilation of his 1950s recordings, The Lake Charles Atomic Bomb, in 1990. He also recorded two albums for Sonet Records in the early 1990s. During this time period, many of his songs also appeared on compilation albums issued by labels in both the US and Europe that featured many of the most well-known zydeco performers.

Chavis earned the nickname "The Creole Cowboy" because of his background raising horses, as well as his habit of wearing a white Stetson hat during performances. In addition, the subject matter of some of his songs was explicitly rural, such as "Zydeco Hee Haw", "Johnnie Billy Goat", and "Motor Dude Special" named for his prized thoroughbred horse. Chavis also routinely wore an apron while on stage, to keep his sweat from damaging his accordion. Stylistically, Chavis provided a rural contrast, with fewer instruments and more repetitive (yet unpredictable and energetic) compositions, with la la roots, compared to the urban zydeco developed and popularized by Clifton Chenier, which featured a broad instrumental lineup, standardized compositions, and electric influences from soul and rock.

Chavis was a prolific writer of zydeco songs, some including references to his friends and acquaintances and others too raunchy to be sold openly. The release of X-rated versions of his songs "Uncle Bud" and "Deacon Jones" on his 1999 album Who Stole My Monkey? resulted in a parental advisory sticker, the first for a zydeco recording. Many of his songs have become standards of the zydeco repertoire, in spite of, or perhaps because of, their generally idiosyncratic and quirky construction and subject matter. "If it's wrong, do it wrong, with me," he would tell his band. "If I'm wrong, you wrong, too!"

Until 1990, Chavis was notoriously afraid of flying. He told record producer Floyd Soileau that if Soileau wanted him to fly to performances, he'd have to get him drunk to get on an airplane. Over a prior five-year period, Chavis made just one trip to California, and he drove there from Louisiana. But after Chavis's mother died in May 1990, he decided he had to overcome his flying phobia in order to advance his music career. His first flight was to New York City to perform at a club called Tramps, and he claimed to have enjoyed the experience.

During the 1990s, having overcome his fear of flying, Chavis performed widely with his band, the Magic Sounds (also credited as the Majic Sounds), and was crowned "The King of Zydeco" in New Orleans in 1993, after Clifton Chenier's death. His style, using a button rather than piano accordion, was more traditional than that of Chenier. He switched between single-, double-, and triple-row accordions and played in "cross position" and in relative minor keys to make a bluesy sound on the diatonic instruments. Around this time, he would stage battles with Beau Jocque, who was a young rival, but the two were in fact friends.

According to The New York Times, "with his rough-hewn voice and hefty accordion riffs, his band's one-chord grooves had a mesmerizing intensity that kept dance floors packed". He appeared at the New York Jazzfest for ten consecutive years as well as appearances at the Newport Folk Festival and the New Orleans Jazz and Heritage Festival, and in 2000 he was a featured act at the San Francisco Jazz Festival. Chavis was featured in a 1994 documentary film titled The Kingdom of Zydeco.

=== Death ===
Chavis died on May 5, 2001, from complications resulting from a heart attack after a performance a week earlier in Austin, Texas. He was funeralized at Our Lady Queen of Heaven Catholic Church and interred at Highland Memorial Gardens, both in Lake Charles, Louisiana.

== Awards and honors ==
Chavis was inducted into the Zydeco Hall of Fame in 1998. In 2001, he was awarded a National Heritage Fellowship by the National Endowment for the Arts, which is the highest honor in the folk and traditional arts in the United States.

== Personal life ==
Chavis married Leona Predium who often accompanied Chavis on tour, and on breaks between sets would sell records, T-shirts, and panties with his photo printed on them. Leona died in 2009.

Boozoo and Leona had six children, Wilson Jr. ("Poncho"), Margaret ("Do-Right"), Louann, Charles, Licia, and Rellis Chavis, as well as 21 grandchildren, and many great-grandchildren. Two of his sons (Charles on washboard and Rellis on drums) were full-time band members, and a grandson occasionally performed with the Magic Sounds.

In 1995, Chavis had the tips of two fingers on his left hand amputated after an accident involving a barbeque pit. With his hand wrapped up in bandage tape, he played a gig the following night.

== Legacy ==
Chavis had completed the recording of what would be his final album only a few weeks before his death. Tentatively titled I'm Still Blinkin' the album was released on Rounder Records later in 2001 under the title Down Home On Dog Hill. AllMusic wrote of the album: "Chavis may have been at the peak of his musical form when this album was recorded….[It] is a worthy legacy for a sorely missed star of Louisiana music."

After his father's death, his son Charles took on the role of bandleader for the Magic Sounds. However, Charles died of a heart attack at age 45, only eight months after his father's death. Charles is buried in the same Lake Charles cemetery as his father.

Following Charles' death, Poncho Chavis kept the Magic Sounds band going, including a tribute performance to his father at the 2002 New Orleans Jazz and Heritage Festival, just four months after his brother's death and less than a year after his father's death. Photos of both Boozoo and Charles graced the stage at the Jazz Fest show. Poncho Chavis and the Magic Sounds continued to perform at festivals until at least 2008.

In 2005, five of Boozoo Chavis' grandsons started a band named The Dog Hill Stompers, partly to keep their grandfather's legacy alive. They released their debut album Keeping the Tradition in 2007, and also performed for the first time at Boozoo's Labor Day Festival in 2007. As of 2017, the Dog Hill Stompers continue to play clubs and festivals in Louisiana as well as around the United States.

Chavis founded the "Labor Day Dog Hill Festival" in 1989 as a fan appreciation party, but also to showcase zydeco musicians and to keep the zydeco tradition alive. Originally held in a field near the Chavis family home, the popularity and growth of the festival required a move to larger venues, with the festival location varying between the Knights of Columbus Hall in Iowa, Louisiana and the Lake Charles Civic Center. The event was always a family-friendly affair, with Leona cooking Creole dishes for the crowds, ranging from red beans and rice to crawfish étouffée.

After Boozoo's death, the festival was renamed as Boozoo's Labor Day Festival to celebrate his legacy and love of zydeco music. His widow Leona managed the festival until her death in 2009, after which their children have been determined to continue the tradition in honor of their father, with daughter Margaret acting as festival promoter. In 2015 the Southeast Tourism Society, which has 12 states as members, named Boozoo's Labor Day Festival a "Top 20 Event". The festival celebrated its thirty-second anniversary in 2016.

Other musicians have acknowledged Chavis's influence and legacy by writing songs about him. Rock band NRBQ included a tribute song titled "Boozoo, That's Who" on their 1989 album Wild Weekend, on which both Boozoo and Charles Chavis also performed. In the song, Chavis is described as "the king of zydeco". Younger zydeco musician Jo Jo Reed released a song he wrote titled "Got It From Boo" on his 1995 album Funky Zydeco.

Several zydeco, Cajun, and musicians from other genres appeared on a tribute album titled Boozoo Hoodoo!: The Songs of Boozoo Chavis released in 2003 on the Fuel 2000 record label.

== Discography ==
=== Studio and live albums ===
Album title	Record label	Stock number	Release year
Louisiana Zydeco Music	Maison de Soul	LP-1017	1986
Paper In My Shoe [reissue]	Ace (U.K.)	CHD 214	1987
Boozoo Zydeco!	Maison de Soul	LP-1021	1987
Zydeco Homebrew	Maison de Soul	LP-1028	1989
Zydeco Trail Ride	Maison de Soul	MdS 1034-2	1990
The Lake Charles Atomic Bomb (Original Goldband Recordings)	Rounder	CD 2097	1990
Boozoo Chavis	Elektra Nonesuch	9 61146-2	1991
Boozoo's Breakdown	Sonet	SNTCD 1042	1991
Zydeco Hee Haw	Sonet	SNTCD 1043	1991
Boozoo, That's Who	Rounder Select	ROUCD 2126	1993
Live! At the Habibi Temple, Lake Charles, Louisiana	Rounder Select	ROUCD 2130	1994
Hey Do Right!	Antone's/Discovery	74707	1996
Who Stole My Monkey?	Rounder	11661 2156-2	1999
Johnnie Billy Goat	Rounder	RRCD 11594	2000
Down Home on Dog Hill	Rounder	11661-2166-2	2001
Festival Stage 1989: Festival Acadiens et Créoles	Valcour	VAL-CD-0022	2013

=== Singles ===
Song title(s)	Album title	Record label	Stock number	Release year	Note(s)
"Boozoo Stomp" / "Paper In My Shoe"	<not applicable>	Folk-Star	GF-1197	1955	10", 78 RPM
"Paper In My Shoe" / "Boozoo Stomp" [reissue]	<not applicable>	Imperial	5374	1955	10", 78 RPM
"Forty-One Day's" / "Bye Bye Catin"	<not applicable>	Folk-Star	GF-1201	1955	10", 78 RPM
"Hamburger's & Popcorn" / "Tee Black"	<not applicable>	Goldband	G-1161	1965	7", 45 RPM
"Deacon Jones" / "LA. Women Love Uncle Bud"	<not applicable>	Kom-A-Day	45-304	1986?	7", 45 RPM
"Monkey And The Baboon" / "Boozoo's Blue Balls Rap"	<not applicable>	Kom-A-Day	45-306	1989?	7", 45 RPM
"Dog Hill" / "Goin' To My House"	<not applicable>	ZBC (Zydeco, Blues, Country)	45-1002	1984	7", 45 RPM
"Paper In My Shoe" / "Leona Had A Party"	Louisiana Zydeco Music	Maison de Soul	45-1036	1986	7", 45 RPM
"Make Up Your Mind" / "Dancin' The Sassy One-Step"	Boozoo Zydeco	Maison de Soul	45-1044	1987	7", 45 RPM
"Zydeco Mardi Gras" / "Make It To Me"	<not applicable>	Maison de Soul	45-1057	1988	7", 45 RPM

=== Various artist compilation albums ===
Album title	Record label	Stock number	Release year	Song title(s)
Rural Blues, Vol 2: Saturday Night Function	Imperial	LM-94001	1968	"Paper In My Shoe"
Rural Blues, Vol 2: Saturday Night Function	Imperial	LM-94001	1968	"Boozoo Stomp"
Nothing But The Blues	CBS (U.K.)	66278	1970	"Forty One Days"
Bluesville	Goldband	GLP 7774	1976	"Paper In My Shoe"
American French Music From The Bayous of Louisiana, vol. 2	Goldband	LP 7777	1978 (re-released on CD in 1995)	"Forty One Days"
Zydeco Birth	Folk-Star	GFCL 103	1987	"Calcasieu Zydeco Blues"
Zydeco Birth	Folk-Star	GFCL 103	1987	"Paper In My Shoe"
Zydeco Birth	Folk-Star	GFCL 103	1987	"Gonna Boogie"
Zydeco Birth	Folk-Star	GFCL 103	1987	"Forty One Days"
Zydeco Birth	Folk-Star	GFCL 103	1987	"Long Black Curly Hair"
Zydeco Birth	Folk-Star	GFCL 103	1987	"Oh! Babe"
Zydeco Birth	Folk-Star	GFCL 103	1987	"Bye Bye Catin"
Zydeco Festival	Maison de Soul	MdS CD-101; MdS LP 1024	1988	"You Act Sick When Your Man Is Home"
Zydeco Festival	Maison de Soul	MdS CD-101; MdS LP 1024	1988	"Deacon Jones"
Kings of Zydeco: Black Creole Music from the Deep South	Trikont (Germany)	CD-0158-2	1989	"Paper In My Shoe"
Kings of Zydeco: Black Creole Music from the Deep South	Trikont (Germany)	CD-0158-2	1989	"Jealous Two Man Step"
Kings of Zydeco: Black Creole Music from the Deep South	Trikont (Germany)	CD-0158-2	1989	"My Toot Toot"
Zydeco Live!: Direct from Richard's Club, Lawtell Louisiana	Rounder	CD 2069	1989	"Dog Hill"
Zydeco Live!: Direct from Richard's Club, Lawtell Louisiana	Rounder	CD 2069	1989	"Jolie Catin"
Zydeco Live!: Direct from Richard's Club, Lawtell Louisiana	Rounder	CD 2069	1989	"I'm Driftin' "
Zydeco Live!: Direct from Richard's Club, Lawtell Louisiana	Rounder	CD 2069	1989	"Make It To Me"
Zydeco Live!: Direct from Richard's Club, Lawtell Louisiana	Rounder	CD 2069	1989	"Boozoo on Boozoo"
Zydeco Live!: Direct from Richard's Club, Lawtell Louisiana	Rounder	CD 2069	1989	"Gone a la Maison"
Zydeco Live!: Direct from Richard's Club, Lawtell Louisiana	Rounder	CD 2069	1989	"Deacon John"
Alligator Stomp: Cajun & Zydeco Classics	Rhino	R2 70946	1990	"Uncle Bud"
Alligator Stomp: Cajun & Zydeco Classics	Rhino	R2 70946	1990	"Paper In My Shoe"
Best of Louisiana Cajun Classics, Vol. II: Cajun & Zydeco's Greatest Artists	Mardi Gras Records	MG 1010	1990	"Zydeco He Haw"
Best of Louisiana Cajun Classics, Vol. II: Cajun & Zydeco's Greatest Artists	Mardi Gras Records	MG 1010	1990	"Zydeco Homebrew"
J'ai Eté au Bal (I Went to the Dance), Vol. 2	Arhoolie	CD-332	1990	"Johnny Ain't No Goat"
101 Proof Zydeco	Maison de Soul	MdS 1030	1990	"Zydeco Hee Haw"
101 Proof Zydeco	Maison de Soul	MdS 1030	1990	"Do It All Night Long"
Alligator Stomp, Vol. 2: Cajun & Zydeco Classics	Rhino	R2 70740	1991	"Deacon Jones"
American Explorer Series: Selections From Debut Releases	Elektra Nonesuch	PR8379	1991	"Boozoo's Theme Song"
American Explorer Series: Selections From Debut Releases	Elektra Nonesuch	PR8379	1991	"Dog Hill"
Swampland Jewels	Goldband	GRLP 7763	1991	"Paper In My Shoe"
Cajun & Zydeco Mardi Gras	Maison de Soul	MdS-CD-1044	1992	"Zydeco Mardi Gras"
Cajun Music and Zydeco	Rounder	CD 11572	1992	"Paper In My Shoe (Papier Dans Mon Soulier)"
Highway 61: The Soundtrack	Intrepid (Canada)	N21S 0009	1992	"Zydeco Heehaw"
Kings of Cajun: 22 Stomps from the Swamps	Music Club (U.K.)	MCTC 066	1992	"Zydeco Hee-Haw"
Kings of Cajun: 22 Stomps from the Swamps	Music Club (U.K.)	MCTC 066	1992	"Jolie Catan"
Stomp Down Zydeco	Rounder	CD 11566	1992	"Sugar Bee"
Zydeco Party	Ace (U.K.)	CDCHD 430	1992	"Zydeco Hee Haw"
Zydeco Party	Ace (U.K.)	CDCHD 430	1992	"Do It All Night Long"
Zydeco Party	Ace (U.K.)	CDCHD 430	1992	"Deacon Jones"
Zydeco Party	K-Tel International	60592	1992	"Dog Hill"
Folk Masters: Great Performances Recorded Live...	Smithsonian Folkways	SF 40047	1993	"Jolie Catin"
Kings of Cajun Vol II: 21 More Stomps From The Swamp	Music Club (U.K.)	MCCD 116	1993	"Uncle Bud"
Kings of Cajun Vol II: 21 More Stomps From The Swamp	Music Club (U.K.)	MCCD 116	1993	"Deacon Jones"
Kings of Cajun, Vol III: 25 More Stomps from the Swamps	Music Club (U.K.)	MCCD 171	1994	"Paper In My Shoe"
Rockin' Zydeco Party!	Maison de Soul	MdS 1049-2	1994	"Boozoo's Trail Ride Breakdown"
Best of Louisiana Music: Sampler	Mardi Gras Records	MG 5015	1995	"Zydeco Hee Haw"
Legends of Zydeco: The Old School Strikes Back	Trikont (Germany)	US-0203	1995	"Boozoo That's Who"
Legends of Zydeco: The Old School Strikes Back	Trikont (Germany)	US-0203	1995	"Deacon Jones"
Legends of Zydeco: The Old School Strikes Back	Trikont (Germany)	US-0203	1995	"Blues All Around My Bed"
Legends of Zydeco: The Old School Strikes Back	Trikont (Germany)	US-0203	1995	"Leona Had A Party"
Legends of Zydeco: The Old School Strikes Back	Trikont (Germany)	US-0203	1995	"Dog Hill"
Legends of Zydeco: The Old School Strikes Back	Trikont (Germany)	US-0203	1995	"Big Leg Woman"
Legends of Zydeco: The Old School Strikes Back	Trikont (Germany)	US-0203	1995	"Grand Mary's Two Step"
Legends of Zydeco: The Old School Strikes Back	Trikont (Germany)	US-0203	1995	"Tell Me What's The Matter"
Legends of Zydeco: The Old School Strikes Back	Trikont (Germany)	US-0203	1995	"Johnny Billy Goat"
Louisiana Spice: 25 Years of Louisiana Music on Rounder Records	Rounder	AN 18/19	1995	"Lula Lula Don't You Go To Bingo"
More Cajun Music and Zydeco	Rounder	CD 11573	1995	"Johnny Billy Goat"
The Real Music Box: 25 Years of Rounder Records	Rounder	CD AN 25	1995	"Lula Lula Don't You Go To Bingo"
Cajun & Zydeco Classics	Flashback	R2 72887	1996	"Uncle Bud"
Zydeco's Greatest Hits	EasyDisc	ED CD 7025	1996	"Uncle Bud"
Louisiana Swamp Blues	Capitol (Europe)	7243 8 52046 2 3	1997	"Boozoo Stomp"
Louisiana Swamp Blues	Capitol (Europe)	7243 8 52046 2 3	1997	"Paper In My Shoe"
Zydeco Dance Hall	EasyDisc	ED CD 7035	1997	"Motor Dude Special"
Zydeco Barnyard	EasyDisc	367070	1998	"Johnnie Billy Goat"
Zydeco Barnyard	EasyDisc	367070	1998	"Sugar Bee"
Zydeco Barnyard	EasyDisc	367070	1998	"Billy Goat Number Three"
Zydeco Barnyard	EasyDisc	367070	1998	"Dog Hill"
Zydeco Fever!: A Sizzling Hot Louisiana Combo of Cajun and R&B	Nascente (U.K.)	NSCD 029	1998	"Paper In My Shoe"
Zydeco Fever!: A Sizzling Hot Louisiana Combo of Cajun and R&B	Nascente (U.K.)	NSCD 029	1998	"I'm Going To The Country To Get Me A Mojo Hand"
Zydeco Fever!: A Sizzling Hot Louisiana Combo of Cajun and R&B	Nascente (U.K.)	NSCD 029	1998	"Lula Lula Don't You Go To Bingo"
Zydeco Party	EasyDisc	ED CD 7045	1998	"I'm Going to the Country to Get Me a Mojo Hand"
Zydeco Stomp: All Instrumental	EasyDisc	ED CD 7065	1998	"Boozoo's Shuffle"
Absolutely The Best Cajun & Zydeco	Fuel 2000; Varèse Sarabande	FLD1041	1999	"Paper In My Shoe"
Allons en Louisiane: The Rounder Records Guide to Cajun Music, Zydeco and South Louisiana	Rounder	11661-6093-2	1999	"Who Stole My Monkey?"
Blues Routes: Heroes & Tricksters	Smithsonian Folkways	SFW CD 40118	1999	"Uncle Bud"
Hot Cajun & Zydeco Music From Tabasco	Flat Town Music Company	11201-0346-2	1999	"Motor Dude Special"
Kings of Cajun: 15 Stomps from the Swamps	Music Collection International (U.K.)	50105	1999	"Paper In My Shoe"
Zydeco Essentials	Hip-O Records	40161	1999	"Paper In My Shoe"
Zydeco Essentials	Hip-O Records	40161	1999	"Dance All Night (Stay a Little Longer)"
Absolutely The Best Of Cajun & Zydeco, Vol. 2	Fuel 2000; Varèse Sarabande	061114	2000	"Uncle Bud"
If It Ain't A Hit, I'll Eat My ... Baby!: The Dirtiest Of Them Dirty Blues	Zu-Zazz (Germany)	ZCD 2009	2000	"Deacon Jones"
If It Ain't A Hit, I'll Eat My ... Baby!: The Dirtiest Of Them Dirty Blues	Zu-Zazz (Germany)	ZCD 2009	2000	"LA. Women Love Uncle Bud"
Music from the Zydeco Kingdom	Rounder Select	CD 11579	2000	"Grand Mary's Two Step"
Putumayo Presents Zydeco	Putumayo World Music	PUT 160-2	2000	"Lula Lula Don't You Go To Bingo"
The Ultimate Anthology of Blues & Jazz: Volume Three, Louisiana/New Orleans	Weltbild Edition (Germany)	CR 6602	2000	"Paper In My Shoe"
Cajun & Zydeco: Alligator Walk	ARC Music (U.K.)	EUCD 1657	2001	"Zydeco Hee Haw"
Roots Music: An American Journey	Rounder	11661-0501-2	2001	"Oh Bye Mon Neg"
The Blues Foundation Presents Blues Greats: Featuring Nominees from the W.C. Handy Awards, 2002	BRG Records	BRG0100	2002	"Keep Your Dress Tail Down"
The Blues Foundation Presents Blues Greats: Featuring Nominees from the W.C. Handy Awards, 2002	Tornado	1313	2002	"Keep Your Dress Tail Down"
Dat's Zydeco: The Best Old-Skool Zydeco	Maison de Soul	MdS 1079	2002	"Dog Hill"
Dat's Zydeco: The Best Old-Skool Zydeco	Maison de Soul	MdS 1079	2002	"Johnnie Ma Cabri"
Deep Blues Story	EMI Music Distribution	5396012	2002	"Paper In My Shoe"
The Louisiana Party Collection: Cajun & Zydeco Classics	Time-Life Music	M18851	2002	"Paper In My Shoe"
The Louisiana Party Collection: 30 Cajun & Zydeco Classics	Time-Life Music	R154-36	2002	"Uncle Bud"
The Louisiana Party Collection: 30 Cajun & Zydeco Classics	Time-Life Music	R154-36	2002	"Paper In My Shoe"
Southern Style: Zydeco	Southern Style (Netherlands)	641920	2002	"Make It To Me"
Southern Style: Zydeco	Southern Style (Netherlands)	641920	2002	"Uncle Bud"
Southern Style: Zydeco	Southern Style (Netherlands)	641920	2002	"Sugar Bee"
Southern Style: Zydeco	Southern Style (Netherlands)	641920	2002	"Zydeco Homebrew"
Zydeco: The Essential Collection	Rounder	1166-11605-2	2002	"Lula Lula Don't You Go to Bingo"
Zydeco: The Essential Collection	Rounder	1166-11605-2	2002	"Keep Your Dress Tail Down"
Zydeco Hot Tracks: Volume One	Maison de Soul/ValueDisc	VMS-7006	2002	"Make It To Me"
The Best In Cajun & Zydeco Homebrew	ARC Music (U.K.)	EUCD1814	2003	"Zydeco Homebrew"
Doctors, Professors, Kings, & Queens: The Big Ol' Box Of New Orleans	Shout! Factory	D4K 37441	2004	"Dog Hill"
Gulf Coast Beach Blast	Texas Music Group/Antone's	TMG-ANT 0062	2004	"Hey Do Right"
The Greatest Mardi Gras Concert Ever!	Fuel 2000	302 061 521 2	2005	"Uncle Bud"
Rough Guide to Zydeco	World Music Network (U.K.)	RGNET 1145 CD	2005	"Johnnie Billy Goat"
Eat To The Beat: The Dirtiest Of Them Dirty Blues	Bear Family Records (Germany)	BCD 16816AS	2006	"LA. Women Love Uncle Bud"
Down Home Saturday Night	Smithsonian Folkways	SFW CD 40182	2006	"Uncle Bud"
American Routes with Nick Spitzer: Hugh Masekela & Joshua Allen	Public Radio International	AR 06-42	2008	"Uncle Bud"
The Best of Bob Dylan's Theme Time Radio Hour: Volume 2	Chrome Dreams (U.K.)	CDCD 5021	2008	"Paper In My Shoes"
Zydeco: The Essential Pulse Series	Mirana	8502	2008	"Zydeco Mardi Gras"
Zydeco: The Essential Pulse Series	Mirana	8502	2008	"Zydeco Hee Haw"
Good Music, Good Times: Spicy Bon Temps Cajun and Zydeco Music from Opelousas, Louisiana	Swallow; City of Opelousas Tourism	<unknown>	2009	"Motor Dude Special"
Radio Radio: Theme Time Radio Hour: Volume 2	Mischief Music (Europe)	MMLTDBOX2	2009	"Paper In My Shoes"
The Best Of Cajun & Zydeco	Not Now Music (U.K.)	NOT2CD358	2010	"Paper In My Shoe"
Hypnotic Cajun & Obscure Zydeco	Moi J'Connais Records (Switzerland)	MJCR 002	2010	"Oh Oh She's Gone"
Simply America	Simply	SIMPLYCD 094	2011	"Paper In My Shoe"
50 Classics of Louisiana Sounds, 1953-1960	Jasmine	JASCD 170	2012	"Paper In My Shoe"
Bluesin' By The Bayou	Ace (U.K.)	CDCHD 1368	2013	"Forty One Days"
The History of New Orleans Rhythm & Blues, Vol. 3, 1953-1955	Rhythm & Blues	RANDB 029	2013	"Forty One Days"
Bluesin' By The Bayou: Rough 'n' Tough	Ace (U.K.)	CDCHD 1403	2014	"Paper In My Shoe"
Bluesin' By The Bayou: Rough 'n' Tough	Ace (U.K.)	CDCHD 1403	2014	"Got Me A Brand New Mojo Hand"
Louisiana Swamp Blues (Remastered)	JSP Records (U.K.)	JSP77180	2014	"Paper In My Shoe"
Louisiana Swamp Blues (Remastered)	JSP Records (U.K.)	JSP77180	2014	"Gonna Boogie"
Louisiana Swamp Blues (Remastered)	JSP Records (U.K.)	JSP77180	2014	"Bye Bye Catin"
Louisiana Swamp Blues (Remastered)	JSP Records (U.K.)	JSP77180	2014	"Calcasieu Zydeco Blues"
Louisiana Swamp Blues (Remastered)	JSP Records (U.K.)	JSP77180	2014	"Boozoo Stomp"
Louisiana Swamp Blues (Remastered)	JSP Records (U.K.)	JSP77180	2014	"Forty One Days"
Louisiana Swamp Blues (Remastered)	JSP Records (U.K.)	JSP77180	2014	"Long Black Curly Hair"
Louisiana Swamp Blues (Remastered)	JSP Records (U.K.)	JSP77180	2014	"Oh! Babe"
Zydeco: Black Creole, French Music & Blues, 1929-1972	Frémeaux & Associés (France)	FA 5616	2015	"Paper In My Shoe"
Zydeco: Black Creole, French Music & Blues, 1929-1972	Frémeaux & Associés (France)	FA 5616	2015	"Forty One Days"
Zydeco: Black Creole, French Music & Blues, 1929-1972	Frémeaux & Associés (France)	FA 5616	2015	"Bye Bye Catin"
Bluesin' By The Bayou: I'm Not Jiving	Ace (U.K.)	CDCHD 1471	2016	"Oh Yeah She's Gone"
Bluesin' By The Bayou: I'm Not Jiving	Ace (U.K.)	CDCHD 1471	2016	"Bye Bye Catin"
Shake 'Em On Down: Vol. 2	Flat Top (U.K.)	FTB-069	<unknown>	"Deacon Jones"
Shake 'Em On Down: Vol. 3	Flat Top (U.K.)	FTB 070	<unknown>	"Jolie Catan"
Shake 'Em On Down: Vol. 4	Flat Top (U.K.)	FTB 1932	<unknown>	"Zydeco Hee-Haw"
Shake 'Em On Down: Vol. 4	Flat Top (U.K.)	FTB 1932	<unknown>	"Uncle Bud"

=== Guest appearance credits ===
Album title	Artist(s)	Record label	Stock number	Release year	Role
Wild Weekend	NRBQ	Virgin Records	91291-2	1989	Accordion
Zydeco Louisiana Stomp	Clifton Chenier with Clarence Garlow	JSP	JSP4212	2009	Accordion, vocals
Aly Meets the Cajuns: Aly Bain [DVD and CD]	Aly Bain	Whirlie (U.K.)	DVDWHIRLIE 201	2012	Rubboard (frottoir), vocals
