= Arthur Adams (singer) =

American blues guitarist (born 1943)

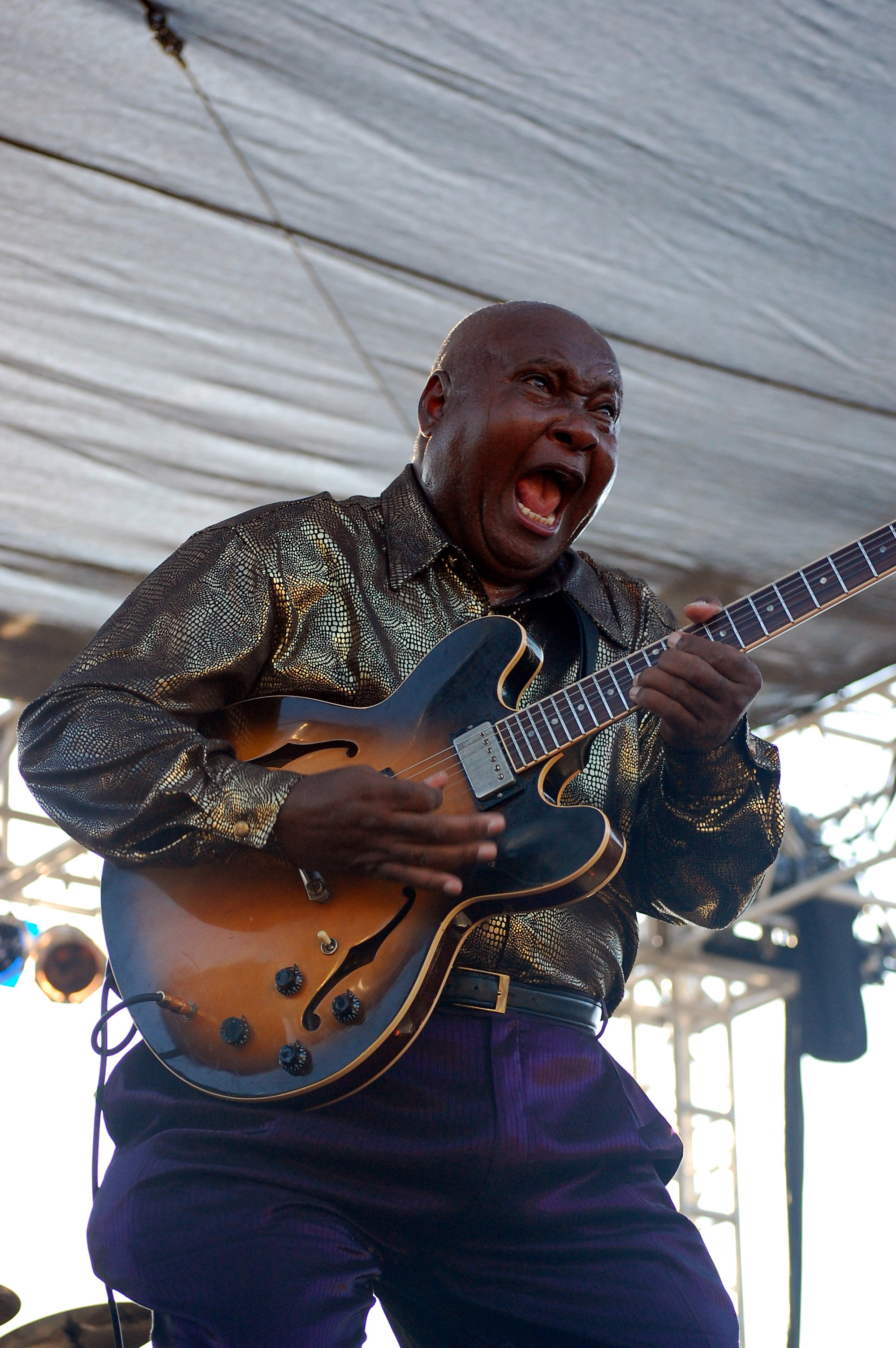
- Adams performing on stage in 2008

Background information
- Also known as: Arthur K. Adams
- Born: December 25, 1943 (age 82); Medon, Tennessee, United States
- Genres: Blues, R&B
- Occupations: Musician, composer, bandleader, film score
- Instruments: Vocals, guitar, bass guitar
- Years active: 1957–present
- Labels: Cleopatra Blues, a division of Cleopatra, RCA, Kent, Jamie, Modern, Blind Pig, Blue Thumb, Fantasy, Utopia, A&M, Dutchess, Chisa, Valdot, Kind of Blue Music
- Website: arthuradamsband.com

Arthur Adams (born December 25, 1943) is an American blues guitarist from Medon, Tennessee. Inspired by B.B. King and other 1950s artists, he played gospel music before attending college. He moved to Los Angeles, and during the 1960s and 1970s he released solo albums and worked as a session musician. In 1985 he was tapped to tour on bass guitar with Nina Simone, and he staged a comeback in the 1990s when he released Back on Track, and became a respected Chicago blues player and bandleader in B.B. King's clubs.

A songwriter, with a blues style that incorporated a variety of genres, and a vocalist with a funky, soul-driven sound, Adams is known for his collaboration with many of blues' elite and continues to perform to date.

== Early life ==
Arthur Adams was born on December 25, 1943, in Medon, Tennessee. At the age of six, he sang in the church choir, but did not begin playing the guitar until he was a teenager. In the mid-1950s, he learned the instrument from his mother, by copying her finger positions. He was inspired by artists such as B.B. King, Howard Carroll of Dixie Hummingbirds, Elmore James and Muddy Waters, which he listened to on the radio.

Adams formed a group with his cousins, called the Gospel Travelers, who toured Tennessee and Arkansas. The group was disbanded when he moved to Tennessee to attend the State University, where he studied music and played in the school's resident jazz and blues band.

== Professional career ==
Adams began playing the blues professionally at a local student bar called the Club Baron. He toured with Gene Allison's band as a backup singer. Allison had success in 1957 with "You Can Make It If You Try" on the Vee-Jay label. Adams was stranded by Allison in Dallas after a tour. He remained there from February 1959 until April 1964, working in local nightclubs including the Clubhouse and the Empire Room, playing with Lightnin' Hopkins, Chuck Berry, Elmore James, and Lowell Fulson. On one occasion, Adams supported Buddy Guy. Tenor saxophonist Jimmy Beck, who had a hit record, the instrumental "Pipe Dream" (on the Champion Records label), hired Arthur in 1959. During his early career, he played gospel and blues.

In the early 1960s, he produced several singles, including "If It Ain't One Thing It's Another"/"Willin' To Die" on Philadelphia-based Jamie Records, which was produced in Dallas by Al Klein, who went on to become a Motown representative.

On the Dutchess record label, he released "I Had A Dream" in 1961. He also released "The Same Thing"/"Tend To Your Business" on the Valdot label, which was owned by Nashville songwriter Ted Jarrett.

On some of Adams' records, up until the late 1960s, he was credited as Arthur K. Adams – the "K" being a marketing device, with no particular significance. It was the idea of promoter/singer Scotty McKay (Max Karl Lipscomb).

In 1964, Adams moved to Los Angeles, California, after a DJ in Fort Worth recommended Adams as a session player to Vee-Jay Records. Although he recorded a session, it was never released. That same year, he began working as a session musician full-time, working with Quincy Jones, and recording singles for the notorious Bihari Brothers (on the Kent Records label), and for Hugh Masekela on the Chisa label. The move was lucrative for Adams, who not only made a name for himself in the clubs, but also became a prolific studio musician, contributing to movies and soundtracks, playing on hundreds of sessions with artists ranging from Lou Rawls to Henry Mancini.

He produced both blues and soul music on the Modern label, and with Edna Wright (later lead singer of Honey Cone), he sang a duet called "Let's Get Together", using the name Arthur & Mary. Upon recommendation from Bobby Womack, Adams appeared in the house band for a TV program hosted by NFL defensive tackle Rosey Grier, who was also a singer. This led to further studio work in Los Angeles; he played on recordings by the Jackson 5, Henry Mancini, Lou Rawls, Willie Hutch, Sonny Bono, Nancy Wilson, Kim Weston, the Ballads (on their 1968 single "God Bless Our Love"), Sonny Charles & the Checkmates, Ltd. (on the 1969 single "Black Pearl", produced by Phil Spector), and others. In 1967, Adams performed in a cameo appearance for the made-for-television movie, The Outsider, which starred Darren McGavin, playing a rendition of "She Drives Me Out of My Mind", later released on the Bihari brothers' Modern Records label.

In the late 1960s he recorded several Rhythm and blues records with members of The Crusaders, co-produced by Stewart Levine. In 1969 he released the single "It's Private Tonight" on the Motown-distributed Chisa Records label. He then joined Bob Krasnow's Blue Thumb Records, and released his 1972 debut album, It's Private Tonight. It was co-produced by Bonnie Raitt and Tommy LiPuma. This featured artists such as The Crusaders' keyboardist Joe Sample and saxist Wilton Felder. Conversely, Adams played on many of the Crusaders' 1970 jazz and funk LPs, including The Crusaders 1, The Second Crusade, Unsung Heroes, Those Southern Knights, and Free As the Wind. In February, 1972, he recorded a live album with organ player Jimmy Smith, which was released as Root Down later that year and became one of his most acclaimed albums.

He released four more albums during the decade. Adams' style became progressively more funk-oriented, with the release of three further albums, Home Brew (1975, Fantasy Records), Midnight Serenade (the follow-up, also Fantasy Records), and I Love Love Love My Lady on A&M. He also co-wrote "Truckload of Lovin'" with Jimmy Lewis, which was the eponymous track on Albert King's 1976 Utopia Records album.

During the latter 1970s, Adams changed style and played soul. In 1981 he had a surprise hit called "You Got the Floor" which reached number 1 in the UK disco chart that year and number 38 in the UK singles chart. He also recorded more solo albums, but in the 1980s he returned to his blues roots, occasionally working as a session guitarist for various groups. After tiring of session work, in 1985 Adams became the bassist for Nina Simone on her 1985 European tour as well as recording on and contributing songs to the Nina's Back album.

In 1986, he recorded a session for a Church's Fried Chicken commercial, with harpist Chris Smith. By 1987, Adams was fronting his own blues band, and again performing live. He wrote two songs, which appeared on for B.B. King's 1992 album There is Always One More Time. Adams became a bandleader at B. B. King's blues club in Los Angeles, often performing with drummer James Gadson.

Adams recorded a version of Ann Peebles soul classic "I Can't Stand the Rain" for the movie Town And Country. He performed at the St. Louis Blues Heritage Festival in August 1997, and in November at the Utrecht Blues Estafette in The Netherlands.

In 1999, he released the album Back on Track, his first solo release in 20 years. B.B. King guested on the album on guitar. This was his first release on the Blind Pig record label. Adams wrote eight out of the eleven tracks, combining the three styles of gospel, blues and soul. Tracks include two duets with King ("Got You Next To Me" and "The Long Haul") – both composed by Adams and Will Jennings.

In 2004, he released Soul of the Blues.

In September 2012, he released an EP called Feet Back in the Door, which was produced by Keb' Mo'. In 2019, he released an album called To Make You Feel Good. In 2023, Adams released Kick Up Some Dust. In 2023, he also released a single "Last Night", which was produced by Fernando Perdomo and was a cover of the hit song by Morgan Wallen.

== Discography ==
=== Albums ===
Title	Year	Label
It's Private Tonight	1972	Blue Thumb
Home Brew	1975	Fantasy
Midnight Serenade	1977	Fantasy
I Love Love Love My Lady	1979	A&M
Back on Track	1999	Blind Pig
Soul of the Blues	2004	PM
Stomp the Floor	2009	Delta Groove
Feet Back in the Door (EP)	2012	Kind of Blue Music
Kick Up Some Dust	2023	Cleopatra Blues
"Last Night" (single)	2023	Cleopatra Blues

=== Charted singles ===
- "You Got the Floor" (1981) – UK #38
