= Al Brown (disambiguation) =

Al Brown (1902–1951) was a Panamanian boxer.

Al Brown may also refer to:

- Al Brown's Tunetoppers
- Al Brown (actor) (1939–2023), American actor who played Stan Valchek
- Al Brown (baseball); see Lester Barnard
- Al Brown (basketball) in 1986 NCAA Men's Division I Basketball Tournament
- Al Brown (chef), from New Zealand
- Al Brown (Canadian football) in 1952 IRFU college draft
- Al Brown, an alias used by gangster Al Capone during his early days in the Chicago underworld
- Alfred Radcliffe-Brown (1881–1955), English social anthropologist

== See also ==
- Albert Brown (disambiguation)
- Alan Brown (disambiguation)
- Alfred Brown (disambiguation)
- Alvin Brown (disambiguation)
