= Herbert Brown =

Herbert Brown may refer to:

- Herbert Brown (Australian politician) (1839–1929), New South Wales politician
- Herbert Brown (footballer) (fl. 1928–1932), English football left back
- Herbert Brown (cricketer) (1867–?), English cricketer
- Herbert Brown (ornithologist) (1848–1913), American ornithologist
- Herbert C. Brown (1912–2004), American chemist and Nobel Prize laureate
- Herbert Charles Brown (public servant) (1874–1940), Australian public servant
- Herbert D. Brown (1870–1963), head of the United States Bureau of Efficiency
- Herbert R. Brown (born 1931), lawyer and author from the U.S. state of Ohio
- Herbert Brown, character in Buck Privates Come Home
- Herb Brown (born 1936), American basketball coach

== See also ==
- Bert Brown (disambiguation)
- Herbert Browne (disambiguation)
