= Jimmy Sweeney =

American singer-songwriter (1922–1992)

- Sweeney on a cover of a greatest hits album issued in 2017

Background information
- Also known as: Jimmy Bell; Jimmy Destry
- Born: James Sweeney Jr. March 15, 1922; Nashville, Tennessee, U.S.
- Died: October 6, 1992 (aged 70) Nashville, Tennessee, U.S.
- Genres: Rhythm and blues; soul; pop
- Occupation: Singer
- Years active: 1947–1962

James Sweeney Jr. (March 15, 1922 – October 6, 1992) was an American singer, songwriter, and self-taught guitarist. He was a member of the Nashville African-American music scene, and a veteran of World War II. As a pop singer, he was known professionally as Jimmy Sweeney a.k.a. Jimmy Bell. Jimmy was born, raised, and died in Nashville, Tennessee.

His recordings span country, rhythm and blues, soul, and doo wop. He was an early influence on Elvis Presley.

== Early life ==
Sweeney was born in Nashville, Tennessee, the second of thirteen children. He was named after his father. A gifted American football player as a boy, he was a self-taught guitarist. He was born, raised, and based in Nashville, Tennessee all of his life. In 1943, he was drafted as Private into the US Army, at Camp Forrest, Tennessee, and was eventually honourably discharged. He married his wife Elsie in Jan 1941, and made ends meet as a carpenter.

== Career ==
Sweeney recorded under various names; Jimmy Sweeney, Jimmy Bell, and Jimmy Destry. He was the lead singer of "The Five Bars", who later changed their name to "The Varieteers".

On July 8, 1948, The Varieteers appeared as guests on Appointment With Music (an NBC radio show originating from WSM, Nashville). The Varieteers, sang "All Dressed Up With A Broken Heart"... The host was Snooky Lanson, with Dorothy Dillard & Beasley Smith and his orchestra.

In Oct 53, the Varieteers were at Ciro's in Hollywood. They performed in the intermissions between sets of Xavier Cugat and Abbe Lane.

He travelled throughout the U.S. and Canada promoting his recordings gathering a legion of fans. However great success was to elude him.

For a time he worked in Western Canada for C.P.Rail.

"She Wears My Ring" charted at No. 5 on CHUM, Toronto, in May 1961.

Then, at the height of it all in 1962, aged 40, he opted out and returned home to Nashville; for a state government job.

A period of inactivity followed, before he started again to write, penning songs for Columbia. Marty Robbins in particular recorded his songs.

Most of his recordings were with the Hickory label.

Associated labels were:

- Bullet Records a "country and western" label owned by Jim Bulleit and located in Nashville, from 1946. Another artist on the Bullet label was B.B. King.
- Buckley label, Louis Buckley's tiny Buckley label, Louis operated Buckley's Records (shop) in Nashville.
- Chic Records of Thomasville, Georgia. Label owned by Chic (Chick) Thompson, active 1956 to 1957.
- Hickory Records of 2510 Franklin Road, Nashville
- Republic Records of Nashville
- Tennessee Records of Nashville

Most of Sweeney's music writing was published by Acuff-Rose Music.

== Jimmy and Marty Robbins ==
He contributed songs regularly for Marty Robbins. This is an incomplete list, the dates are the years the songs were issued by Marty:

- Don't Go Away Senor – 1957
- No Tears, No Regrets – 1965
- "Will There Be Stars in My Crown?" (George Jones, Jimmy Sweeney, Edmond Hewitt) – 1965
- My Wonderful One – 1969
- When My Turn comes around – 1969
- You Say It's Over – 1971
- You're an Angel disguised as a Girl – 1987

== Jimmy and Elvis ==
Sweeney's main claim to fame is as an influence to the young Elvis and that he was the mystery singer on a demo disk played to Elvis by Sam Phillips.

A myth from the 1950s is that Elvis was daunted by the performance on record of an (unknown) singer. The story is that Elvis as a 19-year-old was introduced to a demo record of "Withut You" by Sam Phillips on 24 June 1954. (Elvis had already visited Sun before that, and Marion Keisker had taken note of his potential).

Sam had a stack of demos that had been sent into him, one was a disk of an unknown ballad "Without You", by an unknown singer with guitar. The song began: "Always at twilight I wish on a star, I ask the lord "to keep you wherever you are..." Sam had been impressed by it, but was unable to ascertain the name of the singer; nevertheless he toyed with releasing it as a single. Marion (Sam's business associate) intervened with the idea to get Elvis to sing it as a debut record. Despite a spirited attempt at recording it, Elvis felt he could not better the performance on the demo, and went on to work on "That's All Right", released in July 1954.

The Sweeney demo remained privately in Marion's hands, its existence became an urban myth. The singer was not identified, till heard by Christopher Kennedy in early 2017, his suspicions were confirmed by Jimmy's daughter Eugenia, among others. The demo disc label identifies it as "Without You", "Audiodisc 3324", recorded at 78 rpm. The writer of the song has never been identified. Earlier to these events in January 1954, Elvis had, in the second of two (self-paid) private sessions, cut a second acetate at Sun Records of "I'll Never Stand In Your Way" and "It Wouldn't Be the Same Without You", the latter a Fred Rose, Jimmy Wakely song. That song and the Sweeney demo have no similarity. There is thus no substance to the claim that Sweeney was an influence.

Later in 1960, Jimmy Sweeney made an original recording of "She Wears My Ring", a F. Bryant, B. Bryant adaptation of an old Mexican song, "La Golondrina". This particular record had been Jimmy's most successful, reaching number 5 on the Canadian Billboard, and, in July 1962, number 24 on the American chart.

Coincidentally, Elvis was to cover it in 1973 on the Good Times album on RCA Records, issued in 1974. It was a long-time favourite of his, he had also (again coincidentally) made a home recording of it in November 1960 at 565 Perugia Way in Los Angeles, officially released on "Follow That Dream Records" label, In a Private Moment album. Roy Orbison recorded it for Monument Records in 1964.

== Death ==
Sweeney died in Nashville from cancer at the age of 70. He was buried at Nashville National Cemetery.

== Legacy ==
An influence on Elvis Presley, he left behind many (now rare) collectible recordings which regularly surface on YouTube, under the names: Jimmy Sweeney, Jimmy Bell, Jimmy Destry, The Five Bars, and The Varieteers.

== Discography ==
45 RPM singles

- "I'm All Dressed Up With A Broken Heart" (Val-Reese-Patrick) b/w "To Make A Long Story Shorter" (Ellis) – Bullet 1009, 1947 (recorded as the "Five Bars")
- "Bars Boogie" b/w "Deep In My Heart" – Bullet 1010, 1947 (recorded as "The Five Bars")
- "(It's) Needless" (Vaughan) b/w "It's Goodbye Again" – Tennessee 809, 1950 (recorded as Jim Sweeney and The Dinning Brothers)
- "Boogie Woogie Jockey" (Sweeney) b/w "I Gotta Leave This Town" – Tennessee 714, May 1950 (recorded as Jimmy Sweeney; A side with Gene Nobles WLAC, Nashville)
- "I'll Try To Forget I've Loved You" b/w "You Don't Move Me No More" – MGM 10888-A/B, January 1951 (recorded as The Varieteers)
- "Tobacco Road" (Edward B. Marks/Arranged Anita Kerr) b/w "The Song Of The Wind" – Tennessee 715, 1952 (recorded as Jimmy Sweeney With (Choir) Accompaniment)
- "Believe In Me" b/w "Desire" – Republic 7054, October 1953 (recorded as Jimmy Sweeney; Republic a subsidiary of Tennessee Records)
- "Deep Blues" (Rose, McAlpin) b/w "I've Got a Womans Love" (Robbins) – Hickory 1004, February 1954 (recorded as Jimmy Sweeney and The Varieteers)
- "I Pay With Every Breath" (Sweeney) b/w "If You And I Could Be Sweethearts" – Hickory 1014, August 1954 (recorded as The Varieteers, vocals by Jimmy Sweeney)
- "Memories Of You" b/w "When Did You Leave Heaven?" – Republic 7101, November 1954 (recorded as The 4 Bars; Republic a subsidiary of Tennessee)
- "Danny Boy" b/w "Your Gonna Be Sorry" – Hidus Records issued 2009, recorded May 1955 (recorded as Jimmy Destry)
- "Call My Gal, Miss Jones" (Jimmy Sweeney) b/w "Minnie, Come Home" (Jimmy Sweeney) – Hickory 1025, May 1955 (recorded as The Varieteers)
- "The Question" (Chick Thompson) b/w "These Tears" (Jimmy Sweeney) – CHIC 1002 December 1956 (recorded as Jimmy Sweeney; Chic Records of Thomasville, Georgia. CHIC active 1956–1957. Label owned by Chic (Chick) Thompson.)
- "Tica Boo" (Ted Edlin) b/w "Bongo Olay" (Jimmy Sweeney) – Chic Records March 1957 (recorded as Jimmy Sweeney)
- "The Midnight Hour" (Jimmy Sweeney) b/w "Till The Right One Comes Along" (Jimmy Sweeney) – DATE 1001 – January 1958 (recorded as Jim Sweeney; Date, a subsidiary of Columbia. This record released in New Zealand and the UK)
- "Sick, Sick, Sick" ((B. Bryant, F. Bryant) b/w "Gonna Find My Sweetheart" (Jimmy Sweeney) – COLUMBIA 4-41201|Columbia Records, June 1958 (recorded as Jim Sweeney)
- "It Wouldn't Be The Same (Without You)" ((Jimmy Wakely/Fred Rose) b/w "Afraid" (Fred Rose) – COLUMBIA 4-41262, November 1958 (recorded as Jim Sweeney)
- "(Where You Lead Me) I'll Follow You" b/w "The Buzzard And The Owl" – COLUMBIA 4-41454, 8/59 (recorded as Jim Sweeney)
- "Prayin' For Someone To Love" b/w "What'cha Gonna Do About Me" (Jimmy Sweeney) – Hickory 1115, February 1960 (recorded as Jimmy Bell)
- "She Wears My Ring" (F. Bryant, B. Bryant) b/w "Going Down To The River" (Jimmy Sweeney) – Hickory 1136, November 1960 (recorded as Jimmy Bell)
- "Lunch In A Bucket" (John D. Loudermilk) b/w "(Yes) Here I Go Again" (Don Gibson) – Hickory 1146, April 1961 (recorded as Jimmy Bell)
- "The Poorest Boy In Town" (Tobias, Pockriss) b/w "Honey Bee" (Jimmy Sweeney) – Hickory 1156, October 1961 (recorded as Jimmy Bell)
- "Your Skies Of Blue (Will Turn Gray On You) (Fred Neil)" b/w "Tomorrow is a Comin" (Gene Pitney) – Hickory 1168, April 1962 (recorded as Jimmy Bell)
- "She Wears My Ring" (Boudleaux and Felice Bryant) b/w "What'cha Gonna Do About Me" (Jimmy Sweeney) – Buckley 1101 NBOW 2937/2938, July 1962 (issued as Jimmy Sweeney; from Jimmy Bell, Hickory masters)
- "Endless" (Chic Thompson, Gwen Boyd) b/w "Beloved" (Chic Thompson, Gwen Boyd) – Parthenon, 1967 (Recorded 1956 at Chic Records)

MP3

- "At His Best" Released 12 June 2017 by E.N. Digital. ASIN: B0721Y9ZVG. Tracks: 9. Length: 21:40. (issued as Jimmy Sweeney)

Record Store Day 2020 Special Release

On September 26, 2020, a special limited edition retrospective of Jimmy Sweeney's music entitled "Without You" was released on Org Music. A limited run of 1300 copies was released. The track listing included the first commercially available release of "Without You" as well as other prior unreleased recordings. The release was produced by Christopher Kennedy. Andrew Rossiter was the executive producer.
