= Club Baron =

Defunct nightclub in Nashville, Tennessee, US

Club Baron was a nightclub in Nashville, Tennessee. Built in 1955 in an African-American commercial district on Jefferson Street, the club was owned by local pharmacist Jackson H. Brown. Ithosted notable artists such as Jimi Hendrix, Ray Charles, and Joe Henderson. Patrons were primarily from Fisk University, Tennessee State University, and Meharry Medical College. After its heyday, the club became an Elks lodge. It survived demolition in the 2010s. The building was listed on the National Register of Historic Places in 2026.

== Performances ==
Notable performances
Artist	Music genre	Date(s) performed
Fats Domino	Rock & Roll / Blues	7/25/1955, 7/26/1955, 5/4/1959
Sonny Thompson	Rhythm & Blues	9/4/1955
The "5" Royales	Rhythm & Blues	10/11/1955, 12/25/1955
Muddy Waters	Blues	10/27/1955
Roy Brown	Blues	11/23/1955, 11/24/1955
Etta James	Gospel, Blues, Jazz, Rhythm & Blues, Rock & Roll, Soul	12/13/1955, 12/14/1955
Bill Doggett	Jazz, Blues	2/29/1956
Ray Charles	Soul, Rhythm & Blues	10/24/1956
Little Walter	Blues	12/12/1956
Jay Hawkins	Blues & Rock	6/5/1960
The Isley Brothers	Rhythm & Blues, Soul	6/5/1960
Jimmy Jones	Pop, Rhythm & Blues, Rock & Roll	6/5/1960
Al Brown's Tune Toppers	Rhythm & Blues, Rock & Roll	6/5/1960
Ruth McFadden	Rhythm & Blues, Soul, Pop	7/21/1960
Jackie Wilson	Rhythm & Blues, Soul, Pop	7/21/1960
Arthur Prysock	Rhythm & Blues, Jazz	7/21/1960
Chris Colombo & Orchestra	Jazz	7/21/1960
Larry Birdsong	Rhythm & Blues	12/7/1961
Joe Henderson	Jazz	7/15/1962

== Other notable occurrences ==
- On September 16, 1963, Cassius Clay visited Club Baron while traveling from Miami, FL to his hometown of Louisville, KY. He engaged with reported outside of the Club Del Morocco, and read them a poem about his upcoming fight with Sonny Liston in 1964.
- Jimi Hendrix was a frequent patron of Club Del Morocco. However, in 1963 he visited Club Baron to challenge renowned Nashville guitarist Johnny Jones to a guitar duel. While Jones beat Hendrix, Jones covered "Purple Haze" in 1969 as a tribute to Hendrix.
- On September 25, 1963, Joel Vradenberg, the operator of the Club Baron at the time, was forced to forfeit $100 in bonds due to charges of disorderly conduct. He was said to have a "disorderly house" and allowing minors and intoxicated persons to loiter on his property.
- On April 29, 1965, the Davidson Country Grand Jury pushed for the closing of the Club Baron, calling it the "crossroads of crime in our city".
- On May 2, 1965, a woman from North Nashville was stabbed to death at the club.
- On August 5, 1965, the Club Baron reopened after closing in June for remodeling. The owner, Jackson H. Brown, chose to begin personally running the club.
- On October 11, 1966, the Club baron was auctioned off by Jim Stevens Realty and Auction Associates.

== Danger of demolition ==
Club Baron went into disrepair due to neglect and storm damage, raising concerns about its demolition. The structure, which had hosted the Elks Lodge #1102 since the 1960s. However, its deteriorating condition, which included a falling roof and considerable water damage, earned it a spot on Historic Nashville, Inc.'s endangered property list. Given the loss of numerous historic landmarks along Jefferson Street, there was growing concern that Club Baron, like others before it, would be destroyed.

Efforts to save the building gained traction when Butch Spyridon, CEO of the Nashville Convention and Visitors Corp., became involved. The neighborhood was skeptical at first since prior promises of assistance had not been delivered. However, Spyridon quickly raised over $300,000 through personal outreach and online campaigns, securing cash for critical repairs. The roof and awning were repaired and electrical and plumbing issues were addressed. The project aimed not only to save the building, but also to restore its use as a community place.
