= Back on Track =

Back on Track may refer to:

- Back on Track (Arthur Adams album), 1999
- Back on Track (Billy Craddock album), 1989
- Back on Track (DeBarge Family album), 1991
- Back on Track (Humble Pie album), 2002
- Back on Track (Lulu album), 2004
- Back on Track (film), a 2013 German comedy film
