= Louis Brooks =

American R&B saxophonist (1911–1993)

Louis Brooks, born Louie O'Neal Brooks (March 19, 1911 – May 5, 1993) was an American R&B saxophonist and bandleader, whose recording of "It's Love Baby (24 Hours a Day)", featuring vocalist Earl Gaines, reached no.2 on the US Billboard R&B chart in 1955.

Brooks was born in Nashville, Tennessee, United States into a musical family; his father was a saxophonist in a New Orleans-style jazz band. He formed a small band in the 1940s and played in local clubs in the Nashville area. As Louis Brooks and the Downbeats, the group first recorded for Tennessee Records in the early 1950s, supporting vocalists including Christine Kittrell and Helen Foster as well as recording under their own name. They recorded several instrumentals featuring pianist Lovell "Knot" Phillips. Renamed as Louis Brooks and his Hi-Toppers, the group began recording for the Excello label in 1954. The following year they had their biggest hit, "It's Love Baby (24 Hours a Day)", featuring Earl Gaines. The record entered the R&B chart in July 1955 and reached no.2. The song was also covered successfully by Ruth Brown and Hank Ballard and The Midnighters.

Brooks and his band continued to perform regularly in the Nashville area in the 1950s; their vocalists included Larry Birdsong and Helen Hebb, the sister of Bobby Hebb. Brooks also played as a session musician in Nashville, as well as working full-time at the First National Bank in the city.

He died in Nashville in 1993, at the age of 82.
