= Ecko Records =

- Founded: 1995
- Founder: John Ward
- Genre: Blues, soul blues
- Country of origin: United States
- Location: Memphis, Tennessee
- Official website: eckorecords.com

Ecko Records is an American blues and soul blues record label, founded in 1995 by John Ward in Memphis, Tennessee.

Ecko Records has released albums by Rufus Thomas, Barbara Carr, Denise LaSalle, Lee "Shot" Williams, Bill Coday, Earl Gaines, O.B. Buchana, Ollie Nightingale, Carl Sims, Quinn Golden, and numerous others. Ecko Records continues to operate in Memphis.
