= Destination Unknown =

Destination Unknown may refer to:

- Destination Unknown (1933 film), an American pre-Code drama film
- Destination Unknown (1942 film), an American film directed by Ray Taylor
- Destination Unknown (novel), a 1954 novel by Agatha Christie
- Destination Unknown, 2001 album by Mest
- Destination Unknown (Ron Sexsmith album), 2005
- Destination Unknown (Vibe Tribe album), 2009
- "Destination Unknown" (song), a 1982 song by Missing Persons
- "Destination Unknown", 2003 song by Crystal Waters and Alex Gaudino
- "Destination Unknown", 1986 song by Electric Light Orchestra (single B-side also included on 2007 re-release of the album Balance of Power)
- "Destination Unknown", 1986 song by Marietta from the Top Gun soundtrack
- "Destination Unknown", 1984 song by Pseudo Echo from the album Autumnal Park
