= Albert Brown =

Albert Brown may refer to:

== Politicians ==
- Albert A. Brown (1895–1971), Canadian politician, lawyer and football player
- Albert G. Brown (1813–1880), Governor of Mississippi and U.S. Senator
- Albert Joseph Brown (1861–1938), Canadian lawyer and politician
- Albert O. Brown (1852–1937), American lawyer, banker and Republican politician from New Hampshire

== Sportspeople ==
- Albert Brown (footballer, born 1862) (1862–1930), English footballer and top scorer for Aston Villa in the 1890–1891 season
- Albert Brown (footballer, born 1879) (1879–1955), English footballer, The Tamworth Sprinter
- Albert Brown (Australian cricketer) (1890–1954), Australian cricketer
- Dick Brown (footballer) (1911–1985), Albert Richard Brown, English footballer
- Albert Brown (snooker player) (1911–1995), English cricketer and snooker player
- Albert Brown (Canadian football) (born 1963), Canadian football player
- Albert Kedrick Brown (born 1981), American basketball player

== Others ==
- Albert Grant Brown (1881–1924, American architect and educator
- Albert Greenwood Brown (born 1954), American convict sentenced to death in San Quentin, California
- Albert Joseph Brown III (born 1968), American performer known as Al B. Sure!
- Albert Brown (American veteran) (1905–2011), survivor of the Bataan Death March
- Albert Oldfield Brown (1872–1945), American actor
- Albert E. Brown (1889–1984), United States Army general
- USS Albert Brown (SP-1050) (1875–1920), tug boat commissioned by the U.S. Navy during World War I

== See also ==
- Bert Brown (disambiguation)
- Al Brown (disambiguation)
