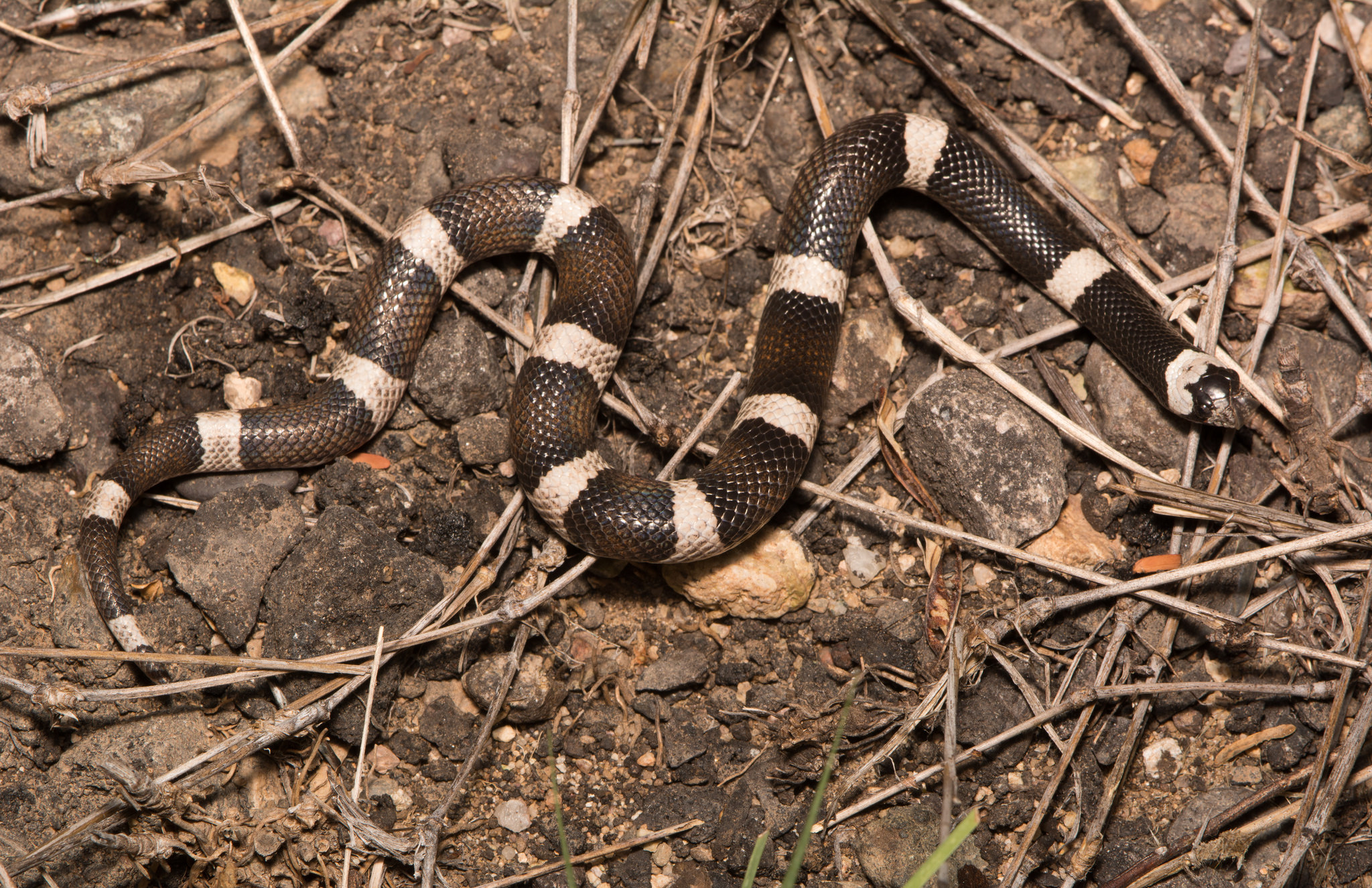

Conservation status
- Least Concern (IUCN 3.1)

Scientific classification
- Kingdom: Animalia
- Phylum: Chordata
- Class: Reptilia
- Order: Squamata
- Suborder: Serpentes
- Family: Colubridae
- Genus: Phyllorhynchus
- Species: P. browni

Binomial name
- Phyllorhynchus browni Stejneger, 1890
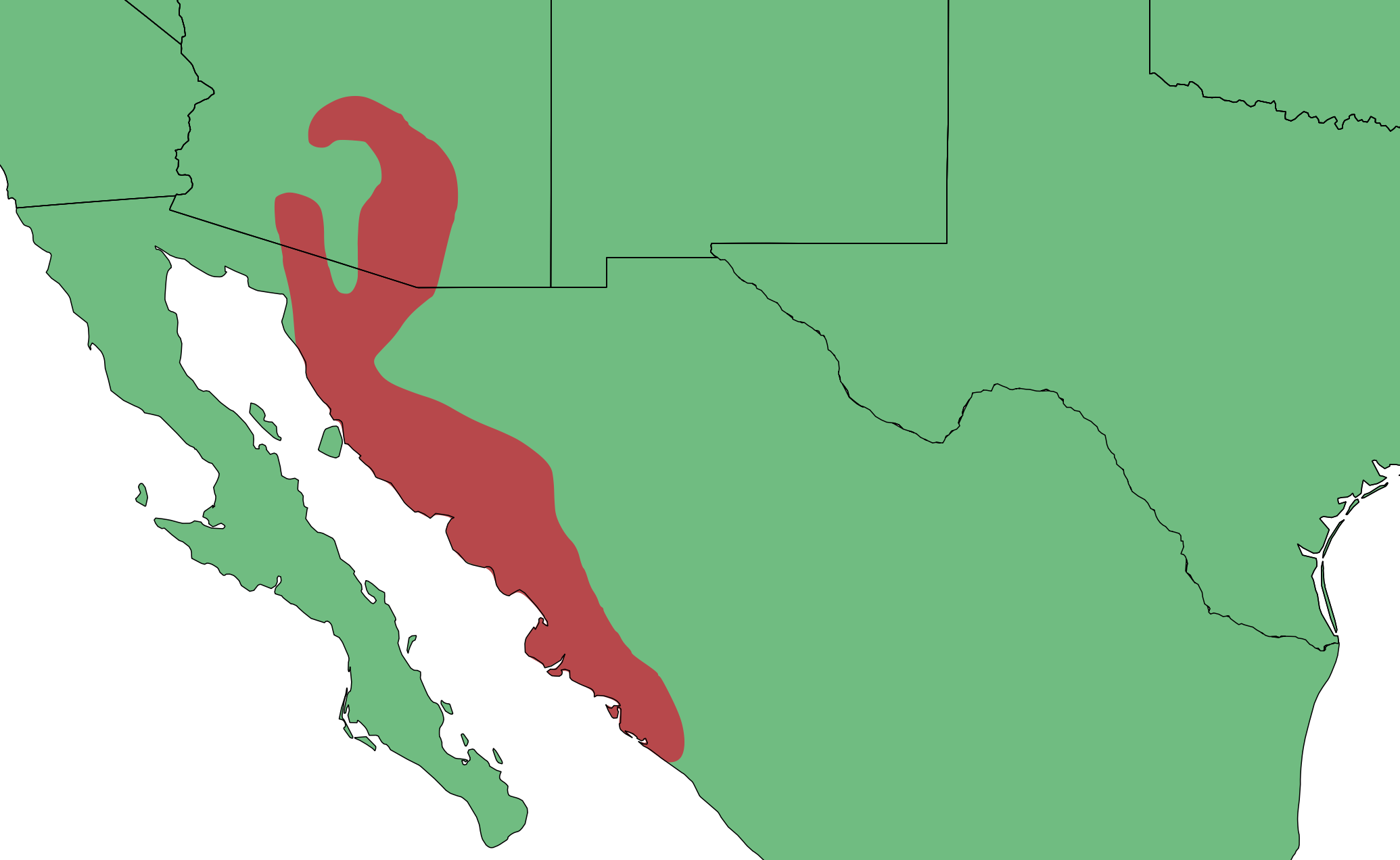

= Phyllorhynchus browni =

Species of snake

Phyllorhynchus browni, the saddled leafnose snake, is a species of snake of the family Colubridae.

The snake is found in Arizona in the United States and Mexico.

== Etymology ==
The specific name, browni, is in honor of American ornithologist Herbert Brown (1848–1913), who collected the holotype.
