= Bert Brown (disambiguation) =

Bert Brown (1938–2018) was a Canadian politician.

Bert Brown may also refer to:

- Bert Brown (footballer) (fl. 1922–1926), English footballer for York
- Sailor Brown (1915–2008), English footballer for Charlton, Nottingham and Aston Villa, sometimes known as Bert

== See also ==
- Albert Brown (disambiguation)
- Robert Brown (disambiguation)
- Herbert Brown (disambiguation)
- Hubert Brown (disambiguation)
- Bertram Brown (disambiguation)
- Bertie Brown, artist, see Freddie Adkins
