= O.B. Buchana =

American singer

- Born: Mound Bayou, Mississippi, United States
- Genres: Blues
- Occupation(s): Singer, musician
- Labels: Ecko Records

O.B. Buchana is an American blues singer and musician.

He was born in Mound Bayou, Mississippi, and grew up in Clarksdale, Mississippi, beginning singing gospel songs from the age of eight.
