= Clifford Curry =

American R&B singer (1936–2016)

Background information
- Also known as: The King Of Beach Music
- Born: November 3, 1936; Knoxville, Tennessee, U.S.
- Died: September 7, 2016 (aged 79) Knoxville, Tennessee, U.S.
- Genres: beach music, soul music, R&B
- Occupation: Singer
- Instrument: Vocals

Clifford Curry Jr. (November 3, 1936 – September 7, 2016) was an American beach music, soul music, and R&B singer.

== Early life and career ==
Curry was born on November 3, 1936, in the Bearden neighborhood of Knoxville, Tennessee.

Curry's career began in high school and he was a member of several groups, including The Echoes, The Five Pennies (for whom he wrote a 1956 release, "Mr. Moon"), Hollyhocks (1957), and the Bubba Suggs Band (1957–1964). As Sweet Clifford he recorded for the Nashville-based Excello Records label, before beginning work with the Fabulous Six and the Contenders. In 1967, he had a hit on the US R&B chart with "She Shot A Hole In My Soul", which Buzz Cason produced. The song was written by Mac Gayden and performed by Gayden and his bandmates Kenny Buttrey and Norbert Putnam.

Despite its commercial failure at the time, his 1968 single "I Can't Get A Hold Of Myself" became a Northern soul anthem from the start of that scene, being played extensively at the Twisted Wheel Club and Wigan Casino.

Known as "The King Of Beach Music," Curry continued to play in the Southeastern United States with his brand of Carolina Beach Music, and was inducted into the Beach Music Hall of Fame in 1995, along with his peers Maurice Williams and Bill Pinkney.

In 1997, Curry recorded an album titled Tennessee R&B Live with Earl Gaines and Roscoe Shelton.

Curry joined and backed Faye Adams on her number one R&B smash "Shake a Hand".

== Personal life ==
Curry resided in Knoxville, Tennessee. In 2010, he was hospitalized for blood clots in his lungs. He suffered a stroke on August 29, 2016. Curry died, after being taken off of life support, in Knoxville at the University of Tennessee Medical Center on September 7, 2016, at the age of 79. He had also suffered from prostate cancer and diabetes.
