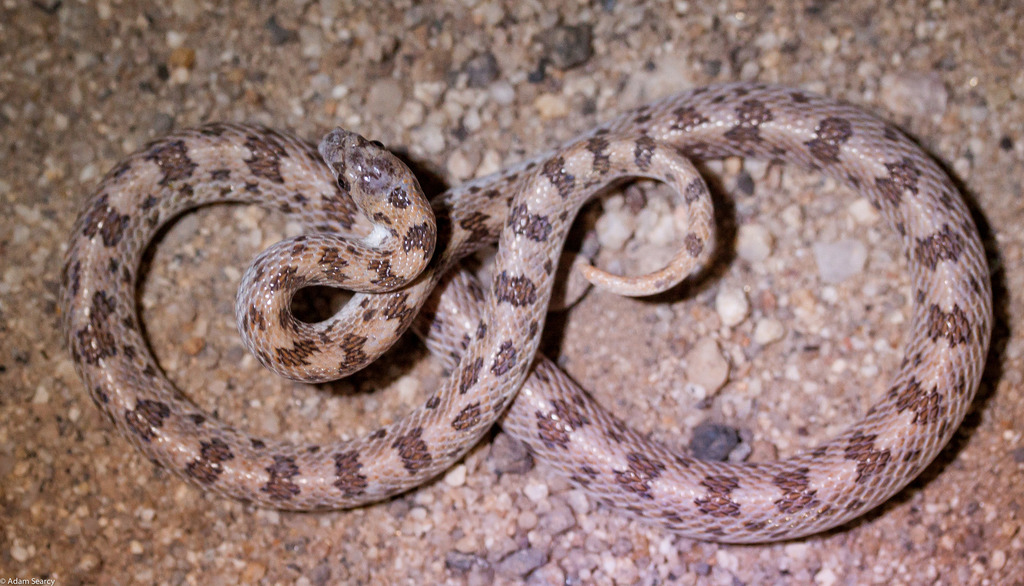
- Spotted leafnose snake in Imperial County, California

Conservation status
- Least Concern (IUCN 3.1)

Scientific classification
- Kingdom: Animalia
- Phylum: Chordata
- Class: Reptilia
- Order: Squamata
- Suborder: Serpentes
- Family: Colubridae
- Genus: Phyllorhynchus
- Species: P. decurtatus

Binomial name
- Phyllorhynchus decurtatus (Cope, 1868)
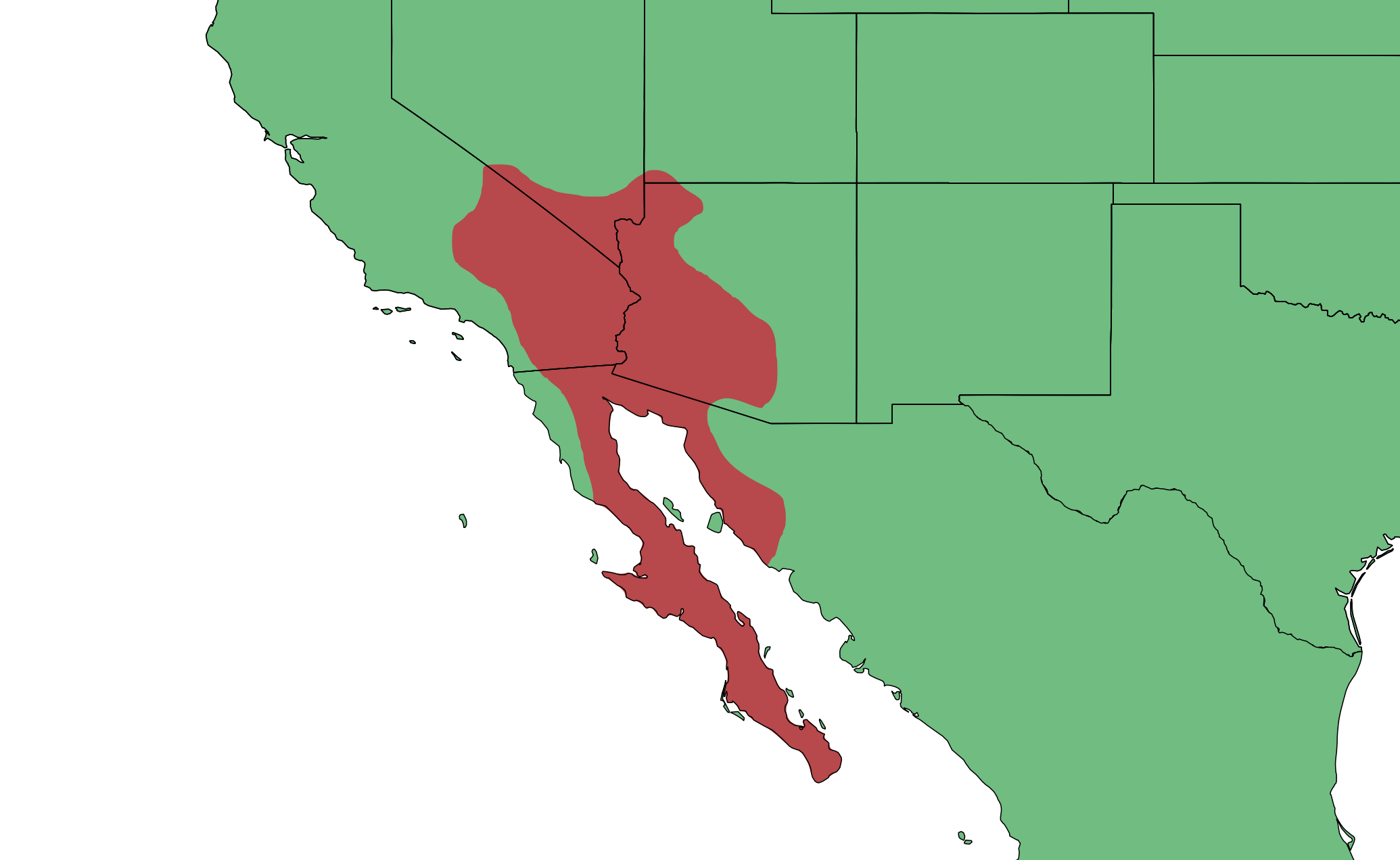

= Phyllorhynchus decurtatus =

Species of snake

Phyllorhynchus decurtatus, the spotted leafnose snake, is a species of snake in the family Colubridae. The snake is found in the United States and Mexico.

== Description ==
Phyllorhynchus decurtatus is a small snake ranging from around 150–450 mm (5.9–17.7 in) in length. The dorsal half of its body varies in color but is generally light brown, with some individuals appearing more cream, pink, or grey colored. Its patterning consists of dark, irregular blotches down the length of its back, and the amount of spots varies between individuals and populations. Markings come in various shades of brown, and are darker along their borders. The amount of blotches on the body range from 18 to 60, and the amount on the tail ranges from 2-15. This species has a dark band running across both of the eyes, which have vertical pupils. It also has a large rostral scale, hence the common name leafnose snake.

== Distribution and habitat ==
The range of Phyllorhynchus decurtatus extends throughout the southwestern United States in the states of California, Nevada, and Arizona, with a single specimen having been spotted in southern Utah. In Mexico it can be found along the coastline of the Gulf of California. Its range overlaps with much of the Sonoran and Mojave deserts.

This species can be found in desert flatlands dominated by the creosote bush.

== Behavior ==
Phyllorhynchus decurtatus is a nocturnal snake, and can be easily spotted near roadways after dark. During the day it has been known to hide underneath rocks or in the burrows of other animals. This species is most active at temperatures of 28–30 °C (82–86 °F), and is unable to survive blood temperatures of 39.3 °C (102.7 °F). This species is reported to be non-aggressive and tends to flee or mock-strike when approached. It also has the ability to secrete musk as a deterrent, and often does so when captured.

=== Diet ===
The diet of P. decurtatus is believed to consist predominantly of lizard eggs, with the tails of banded geckos making up a small portion of their diet.

=== Predators ===
Phyllorhynchus decurtatus are preyed upon by other snakes, they are also frequently killed by vehicle strikes.

=== Reproduction ===
The reproductive period takes place from June to July, although specific breeding behaviors are unknown. During this period, it is suspected that males will travel in search of females, as they are often spotted more abundantly during that time. Female snakes generally lay a small clutch of three to four eggs. Hatchlings are patterned the same as adults.

== Subspecies ==
Phyllorhynchus decurtatus has five recognized subspecies:

- The Baja California leaf-nosed snake, P. d. decurtatus (Cope, 1868).
- The Monserrate leaf-nosed snake, P. d. arenicola (Savage and Cliff, 1954).
- The Sonoran leaf-nosed snake, P. d. norrisi (Smith and Langebartel, 1951).
- The cloudy leaf-nosed snake, P. d. nubilus (Klauber, 1940).
- The desert leaf-nosed snake, P. d. perkinsi (Klauber, 1935).
