= Barbara Carr =

American blues singer (1941–2026)

- Born: Barbara Jean Crosby; January 9, 1941; St. Louis, Missouri, U.S.
- Died: April 15, 2026 (aged 85) Maryville, Illinois, U.S.
- Genres: Blues, soul-blues
- Occupation: Singer

Barbara Jean Carr (née Crosby; January 9, 1941 – April 15, 2026) was an American soul blues singer.

== Life and career ==
Barbara Jean Crosby was born in St Louis, Missouri, on January 9, 1941. Like many blues musicians, she got her start in church, performing with her two sisters. At age 16, she formed the Comets, a band that performed cover tunes. Her break came when a brother-in-law working in Gaslight Square said bandleader Oliver Sain was looking for a female vocalist to replace Fontella Bass. Carr got the job, which eventually led to her first solo recording contract with Chess Records in Chicago, Illinois, in 1966.

Carr and husband, Charles Carr, soon started their own record label, Bar-Car. Their first recordings included Good Woman Go Bad and Street Woman. She continued to record intermittently and performed with Sain until 1972, when she temporarily retired to raise a family. A widow, she married, secondly, to Bill Greensmith, who survived her.

After returning to perform with local bands around St Louis, she again began recording. With her husband, she set up her own record label, Bar-Car, in 1982, and recorded a number of singles at Muscle Shoals, Alabama, which provided the basis for her first album, Good Woman Go Bad, in 1989. A second album, Street Woman, followed in 1992. In 1996, Carr signed with Ecko Records, which produced such songs as "Footprints on the Ceiling", "The Bo Hawg Grind", "If You Can't Cut The Mustard", "The Right Kind Of Love", and "Bone Me Like You Own Me". While still with Ecko Records, Carr recorded "What A Woman Wants", "Let A Real Woman Try", "Rainbow", "The Best Woman", and "Stroke It". Carr has recorded nine albums with Ecko, including two best of compilations, The Best of Barbara Carr, and The Best of Barbara Carr, Vol. 2.

She was honored twice with the Living Blues Readers Award as 'Female Blues Artist of the Year'. Her 2012 release, Keep The Fire Burning, on Catfood Records, reached top ten on both the Living Blues Report and the Roots Music Report. It was selected one of Down Beat magazine's Best Albums of the Year. Carr was on the cover of the November–December 2012 issue of Living Blues and was featured in that issue.

In 2013 and 2014, Carr was nominated for a Blues Music Award in the 'Soul Blues Female Artist' category.

Carr died on April 15, 2026, at the age of 85, in Maryville, Illinois.

== Albums ==
- Good Woman Go Bad - Bar-Car Records, 1989
- Street Woman - Bar-Car, 1992
- Footprints on the Ceiling - Ecko Records, 1997
- Bone Me Like You Own Me - Ecko, 1998
- What a Woman Wants - Ecko, 1999
- Stroke It - Ecko, 2000
- The Best Woman - Ecko, 2001
- On My Own - Bar-Car/Hollister Entertainment Group, 2002
- Talk to Me - Mardi Gras Records, 2003
- The Best of Barbara Carr - Ecko, 2003 (compilation)
- Down Low Brother - Ecko, 2006
- It's My Time... - Ecko, 2007
- Savvy Woman - CDS Records, 2009
- Southern Soul Blues Sisters (with Uvee Hayes) - Aviara Music, 2009
- The Best of Barbara Carr, Vol. 2 - Ecko, 2011 (compilation)
- Keeps the Fire Burning - Catfood Records, 2012
