= Christine Kittrell =

- Also known as: Christine Furlough
- Born: Christine Joygena Porter; August 11, 1929; Nashville, Tennessee, U.S.
- Died: December 19, 2001 (aged 72) Columbus, Ohio, U.S.
- Genres: R&B
- Instrument: Vocals
- Years active: 1951–1968
- Labels: Tennessee, Republic, Champion, Vee-Jay, Federal, King Records

Christine Kittrell (August 11, 1929 – December 19, 2001) was an American R&B singer, who first recorded tracks in 1951 with Louis Brooks and his Band.

Kittrell was born Christine Joygena Porter in Nashville, Tennessee, United States, and as a child was adopted by Fred and Roberta Pennington. She made her professional debut as a singer with Louis Brooks and his Band in 1945. She also toured with Big Joe Turner's band. Her first record, "Old Man You're Slipping", was made with Brooks in 1951 for the Tennessee record label, and one of her most successful records, "Sittin' Here Drinking" in 1952, featured members of Fats Domino's band.

She sang in clubs in New Orleans as well as Nashville, and became the featured singer with Paul "Hucklebuck" Williams's band in late 1952. In 1953, she started recording as a solo singer for Republic Records, with some regional success; two tracks featured Little Richard on piano and a third had Richard as backing vocalist. The following year, she worked on the west coast with Johnny Otis and Earl Bostic, and also worked with Louis Armstrong, B. B. King, and John Coltrane.

On June 20, 1954, Kittrell played at the tenth Cavalcade of Jazz concert held at Wrigley Field in Los Angeles, which was produced by Leon Hefflin, Sr. She performed along with The Flairs, Count Basie and his Orchestra, Lamp Lighters, Louis Jordan and His Tympany Five, Ruth Brown, and Perez Prado and his Orchestra.

In late 1954, it was reported that she had left the recording industry to sing with the Simmons Akers gospel singers. However, she made further records after 1959 for the Champion, Vee-Jay, Federal and King labels. One of her recordings for Vee-Jay was the original version of the Leiber and Stoller song "I'm a Woman", later recorded by Peggy Lee. In the 1960s, she spent several years touring U.S. Army bases in Southeast Asia to entertain the troops; in 1967, she was wounded while performing in Vietnam. She made her last recordings in 1968, but continued to perform occasionally in clubs and at blues festivals until the 1990s.

Kittrell later settled in Columbus, Ohio. As Christine Furlough, she died at the Riverside Methodist Hospital in 2001, of emphysema. A compilation CD of her recordings was subsequently issued by Bear Family Records.
