= Mississippi Slim (country singer) =

American singer-songwriter (1923–1973)

Background information
- Born: Carvel Lee Ausborn; September 24, 1923; Smithville, Mississippi, United States
- Died: December 1, 1973 (aged 50) United States
- Genres: hillbilly
- Occupations: Singer-songwriter, musician
- Instruments: Guitar, vocals
- Years active: 1940s–1957
- Label: Tennessee Records

Carvell Lee Ausborn (September 24, 1923 – December 1, 1973), better known by his stage name, Mississippi Slim, was a hillbilly singer who had a radio show on Tupelo's WELO during the later 1940s and recorded for Tennessee Records. Ausborn also gained fame among Elvis Presley historians because he was one of the earliest musical influences of the young Presley and once let him sing on his radio show.

== Biography ==
Ausborn was born in Smithville, Mississippi. According to Peter Guralnick, he had taken up guitar at the age of 13 to pursue a career in music. He was inspired by Jimmie Rodgers, Hank Williams, Ernest Tubb and Ausborn's cousin Rod Brasfield, a then prominent country comedian who toured with Hank Williams.

Slim travelled all over the country with Goober and His Kentuckians and the Bisbee's Comedians tent show and even joined the Grand Ole Opry once or twice, largely on the strength of his cousin's connections. He also became known as one of Elvis Presley's first musical heroes and critics.

According to Bill Mitchell, Slim "was a good entertainer" who put on a "pretty lively show," primarily "love songs with comedy. The people really enjoyed it."

According to his brother, James Ausborn: "[Elvis] would always say 'Let's go to your brother's program today. Can you go up there with me? I want him to show me some more chords on the guitar.' We'd walk into town on Saturday, go down to the station on Spring Street [this was the broadcast before the Jamboree], a lot of times the studio would be full but my brother would always show him some chords."

== Discography ==
- 1951 – "You’re Gonna Be Sorry" b/w "Memory Of You" (Tennessee 738)
- 1951 – "Beer Drinkin’ Blues" b/w "I'm Through Cryin' Over You" (Tennessee 745)
- 1953 – "I’m A Long Gone Doggie" b/w "I Know You Can't Be True" (Tennessee 794)
- 1953 – "Tired Of Your Lies" b/w "Queen For A Day" (Tennessee 827)
