= You Got the Floor =

"You've Got the Floor"

Single by Arthur Adams
- Genre: Jazz-funk
- Label: RCA

"You Got the Floor" is a single by American guitarist and singer Arthur Adams. It entered the UK Singles Chart on 24 October 1981, reaching a peak position of number 38 and remaining on the chart for five weeks.

The record originally appeared on the small US label Inculcation, owned by actor Bernie Hamilton, who produced the track.
