= Earl Gaines =

American singer (1935–2009)

- Also known as: Earl Gains
- Born: Earl Gaines Jr. August 19, 1935; Decatur, Alabama, U.S.
- Died: December 31, 2009 (aged 74) Nashville, Tennessee, U.S.
- Genres: Soul blues, electric blues, R&B
- Occupation: Singer
- Years active: 1954–2009

Earl Gaines Jr. (August 19, 1935 – December 31, 2009) was an American soul blues and electric blues singer. Born in Decatur, Alabama, he sang lead vocals on the hit single "It's Love Baby (24 Hours a Day)", credited to Louis Brooks and his Hi-Toppers, before undertaking a low-key solo career. In the latter capacity, he had minor success with "The Best of Luck to You" (1966) and "Hymn Number 5" (1973). Noted as the best R&B singer from Nashville, Gaines was also known for his lengthy career.

== Biography ==
Gaines was born in Decatur, Alabama, in 1935. After moving from his hometown in his teenage years, and relocating to Nashville, Tennessee, he found employment as both a singer and occasional drummer. Via work, he did for local songwriter Ted Jarrett, Gaines moved from singing in clubs to meeting Louis Brooks. Brooks led the instrumental Hi-Toppers group, who had a recording contract with the Excello label. Their subsequent joint recording, "It's Love Baby (24 Hours a Day)," peaked at No. 2 on the US Billboard R&B chart in 1955. It was Gaines' biggest hit, but his name was not credited on the record.

Breaking away from the confines of the group, Gaines became part of the 1955 R&B Caravan of Stars, with Bo Diddley, Big Joe Turner, and Etta James. Their tour culminated with an appearance at New York's Carnegie Hall. Without any tangible success, Gaines recorded for the Champion and Poncello labels for another few years, as well as joining Bill Doggett's band as lead vocalist. In 1963, he joined Bill "Hoss" Allen's repertoire of artists, and by 1966 had issued the album The Best of Luck to You, seeing the title track reach the Top 40 in the US R&B chart. He appeared on the television program The !!!! Beat, and later released material for King and Sound Stage 7, including his cover version of "Hymn Number 5". Recordings made between 1967 and 1973 for De Luxe were reissued in 1998. On many of his De Luxe recordings in the late 1960s and early 1970s, Gaines was backed by Freddy Robinson's orchestra.

In 1975, Gaines recorded "Drowning On Dry Land" for Ace, before leaving the music industry for almost a decade and a half, to work as a truck driver. He finally re-emerged in 1989 with the album House Party.

In the 1990s Gaines worked with Roscoe Shelton and Clifford Curry. On Appaloosa Records, Gaines issued I Believe in Your Love (1995), and in 1997 he reunited with Curry and Shelton for a collaborative live album. He released Everything's Gonna Be Alright in 1998. Gaines work was on the 2005 Grammy Award-winning Night Train to Nashville: Music City Rhythm & Blues, 1945–1970, an exhibit at the Country Music Hall of Fame and Museum. His own albums The Different Feelings of Blues and Soul (2005) and Nothin' But the Blues (2008) followed, the latter released on the Ecko label.

In late 2009 Gaines had to cancel a concert tour of Europe due to ill health, and he died in Nashville on the last day of that year, at the age of 74.

== Discography ==
=== Albums ===
- The Best of Luck to You (1966) – HBR Records
- Lovin' Blues (1970) – De Luxe Records
- That's How Strong My Love Is (1979) – Vivid Sound Records
- Yearning and Burning (1986) – Charly Records
- House Party (1989) – Meltone Records
- I Believe in Your Love (1995) – Appaloosa Records
- Tennessee R&B Live (1997) – Appaloosa Records (with Roscoe Shelton and Clifford Curry)
- Everything's Gonna Be Alright (1998) – Black Top Records
- 24 Hours a Day (1999) – Black Magic Records
- Let's Work Together (2000) – Cannonball Records (with Roscoe Shelton)
- The Different Feelings of Blues and Soul (2005) – Blue Fye Records
- The Lost Soul Tapes (2006) – Aim Records
- Crankshaft Blues (2007) – SPV Records
- Nothin' But the Blues (2008) – Ecko Records
- Good To Me (2010) – Ecko Records – Released posthumously

=== Chart singles ===
- "The Best of Luck to You" (1966) – HBR Records – US R&B #28

== See also ==
- List of soul-blues musicians
