= Madison (dance) =

Novelty dance popular in the 1950s-60s

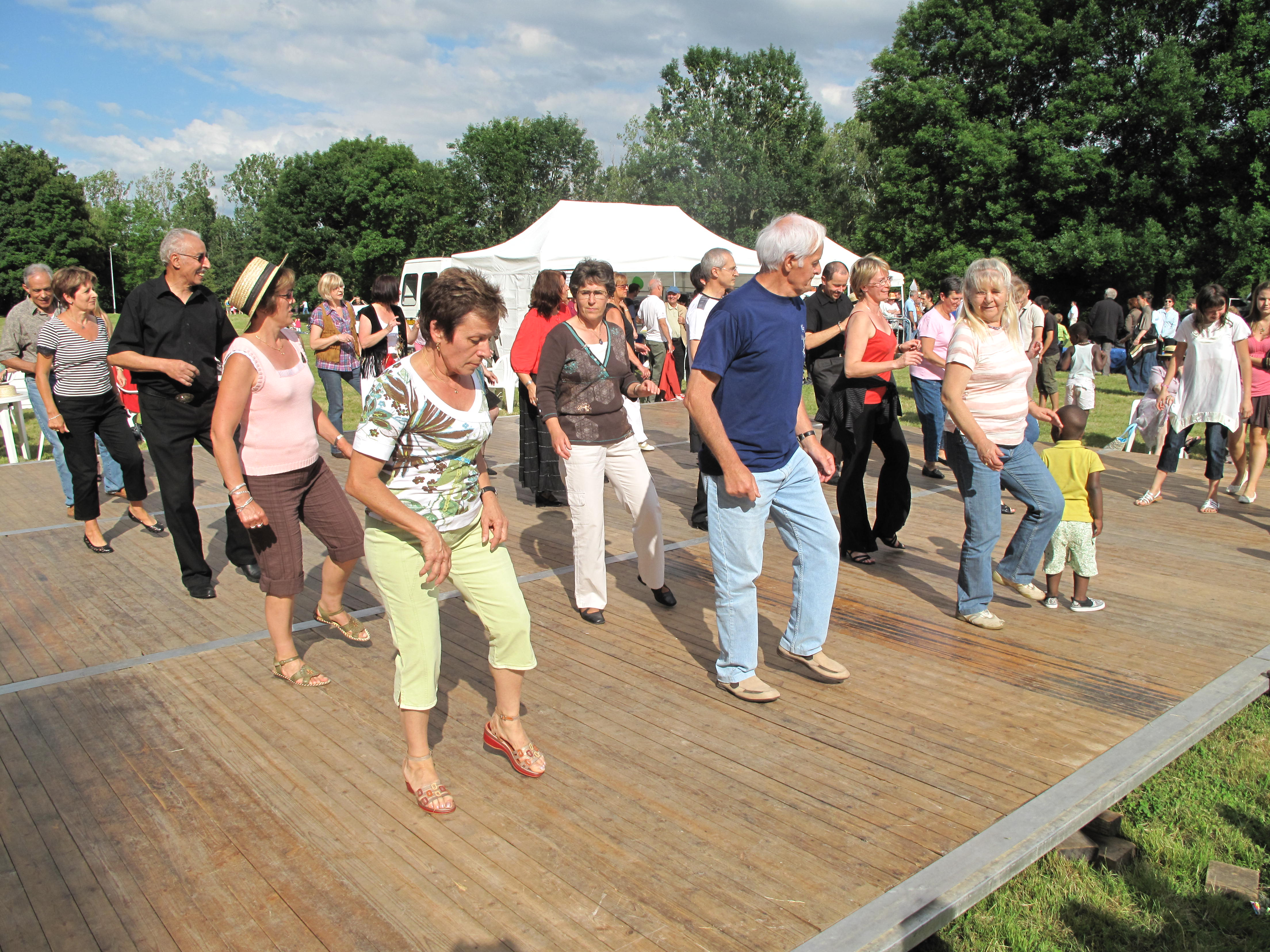
Madison dancers before quarter of turn

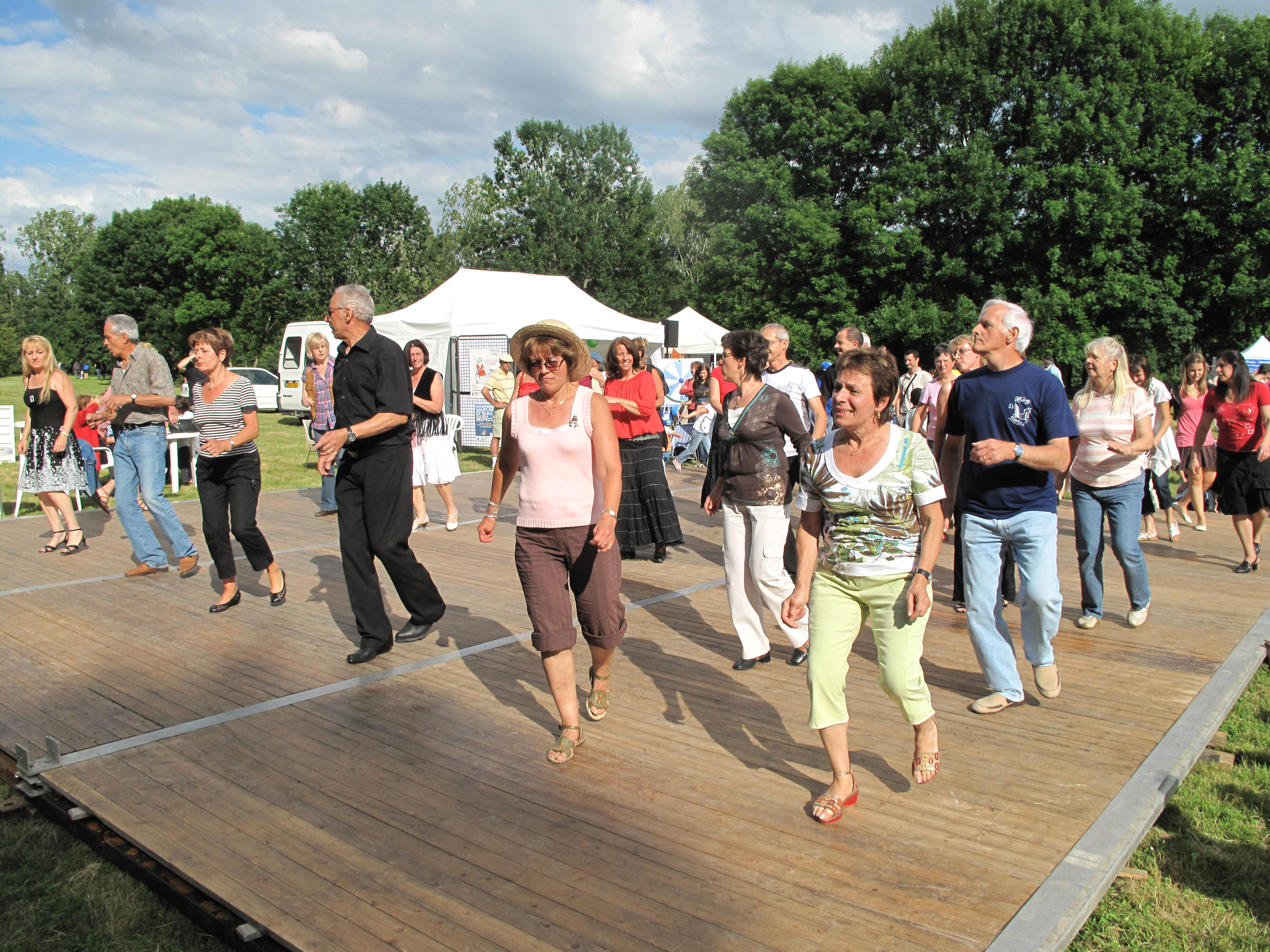
The same, after the quarter of turn on the right

The Madison is a novelty dance that was popular in the late 1950s to mid-1960s.

== Description and history ==
It was created and first danced in Columbus, Ohio, in 1957. The local popularity of the dance and record in Baltimore, Maryland, came to the attention of the producers of The Buddy Deane Show in 1960, which led to other dance shows picking it up.

The Madison is a line dance that features a regular back-and-forth pattern interspersed with called steps. Its popularity inspired dance teams and competitions, as well as various recordings, and today it is still sometimes performed as a nostalgic dance. The Madison is featured in the John Waters movie Hairspray (1988), and it continues to be performed in the Broadway musical Hairspray. Both the film and the musical feature one of many songs released during the Madison "craze" in the US.

The jazz pianist Ray Bryant recorded "Madison Time" for Columbia Records in 1959. Billboard stated that "The footwork for the Madison dance is carefully and clearly diagrammed for the terpers." The Ray Bryant version was the version featured in the film Hairspray. The other popular version was by Al Brown & The Tunetoppers. Another version was recorded by radio presenter Alan Freeman for Decca Records in 1962.

An example of an album featuring music for the Madison is The Madison Dance Party (1960) by Al Brown's Tunetoppers with calls by Al Brown. It includes a song titled "The Madison" as well as several other songs to which the Madison can be danced, including "Madison Party", "Mo' Madison", "Madison Jr.", and "Madison Jam", among others.

The Madison basic, danced in the film Hairspray, is as follows:

1. Step left forward
2. Place right beside left (no weight) and clap
3. Step back on right
4. Move left foot back and across the right
5. Move left foot to the left
6. Move left foot back and across the right

Called steps included the Double Cross, the Cleveland Box, The Basketball (with Wilt Chamberlain), the Big "M", the "T" Time, the Jackie Gleason, the Birdland, and The Rifleman. "The Jackie Gleason" is based on a tap dance movement known as "Shuffle Off to Buffalo". Additional called sequences are: Two Up and Two Back, Big Boss Cross in Front, Make a "T", the Box, Cuddle Me, and Flying High. "Away We Go" may be the same as "The Jackie Gleason".

Time magazine noted the Madison in April 1960.

The Madison dance has become very popular in the Kingdom of Cambodia and Kampuchea Krom (Mekong delta). It was introduced to Cambodia in the 1960s and remains a very popular dance at wedding banquets and other parties. The largest Madison dance in the world took place in Siem Reap, Cambodia, on 15 April 2023 during the Cambodian New Year celebrations. The event, organized by the Union of Youth Federations of Cambodia (UYFC), involved 4,999 participants breaking their own previous record set in 2015 with 2,015 participants.

== Gallery ==
Concatenation of 4 photos :

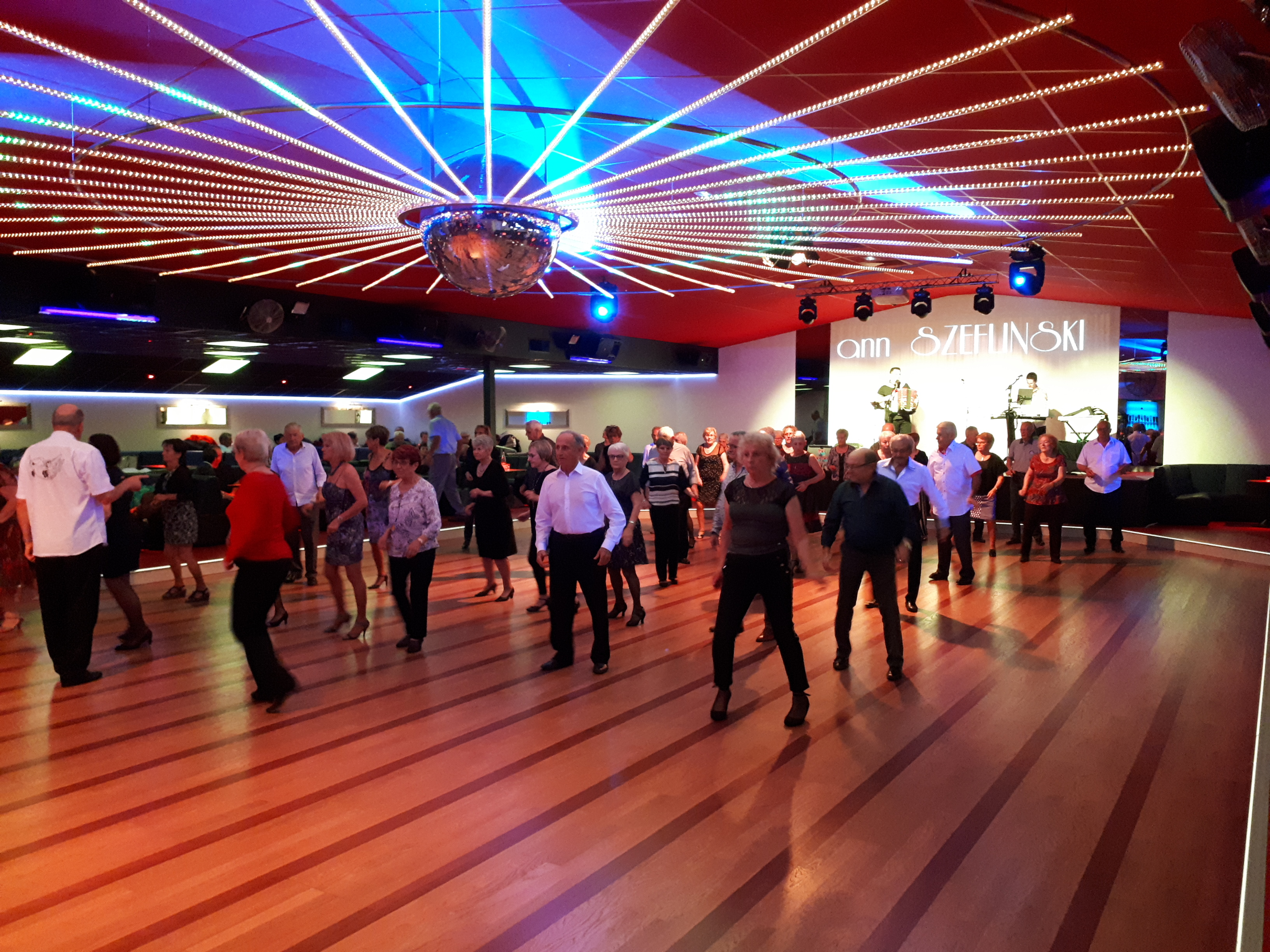
1 of 4

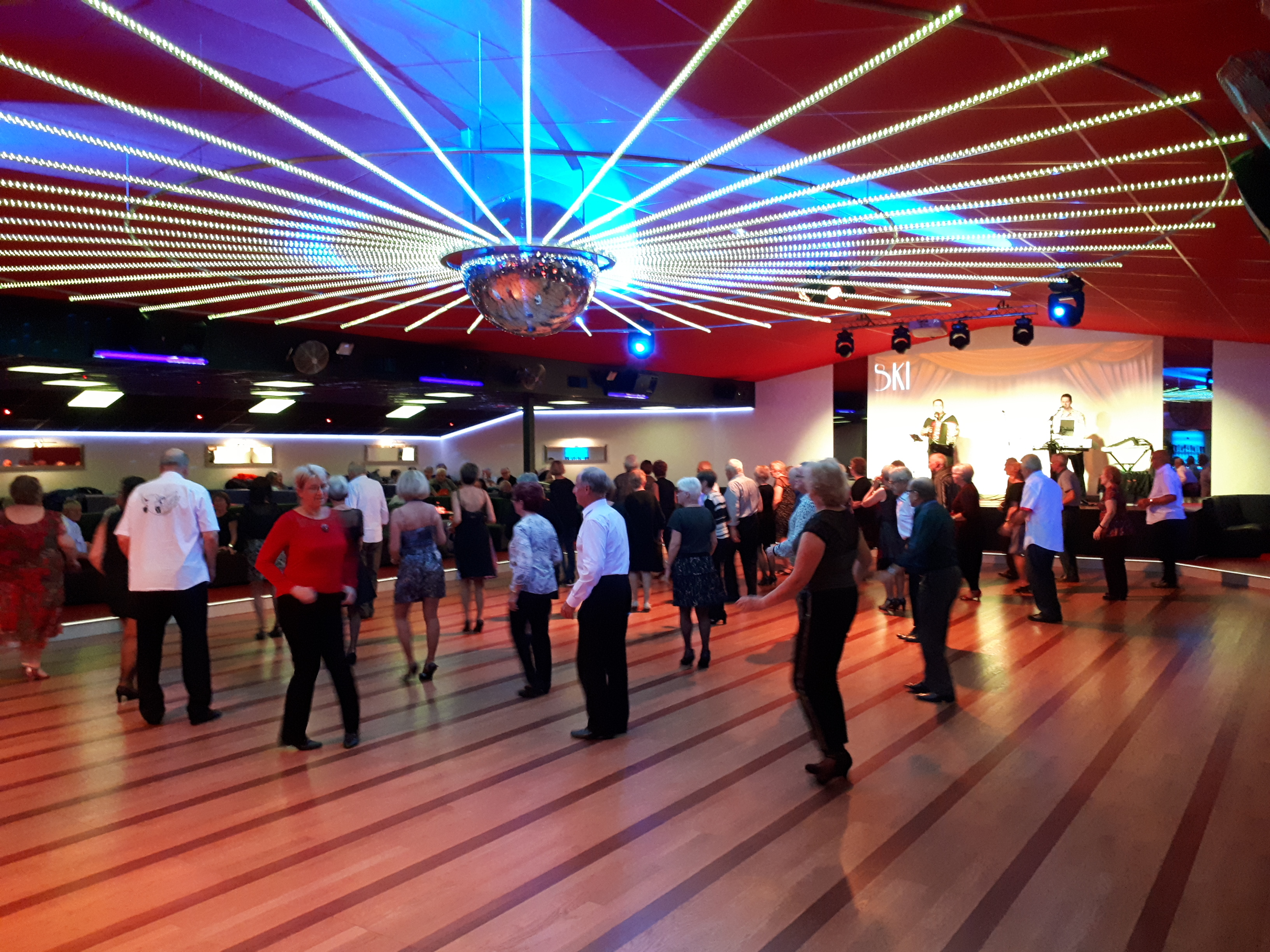
2 of 4

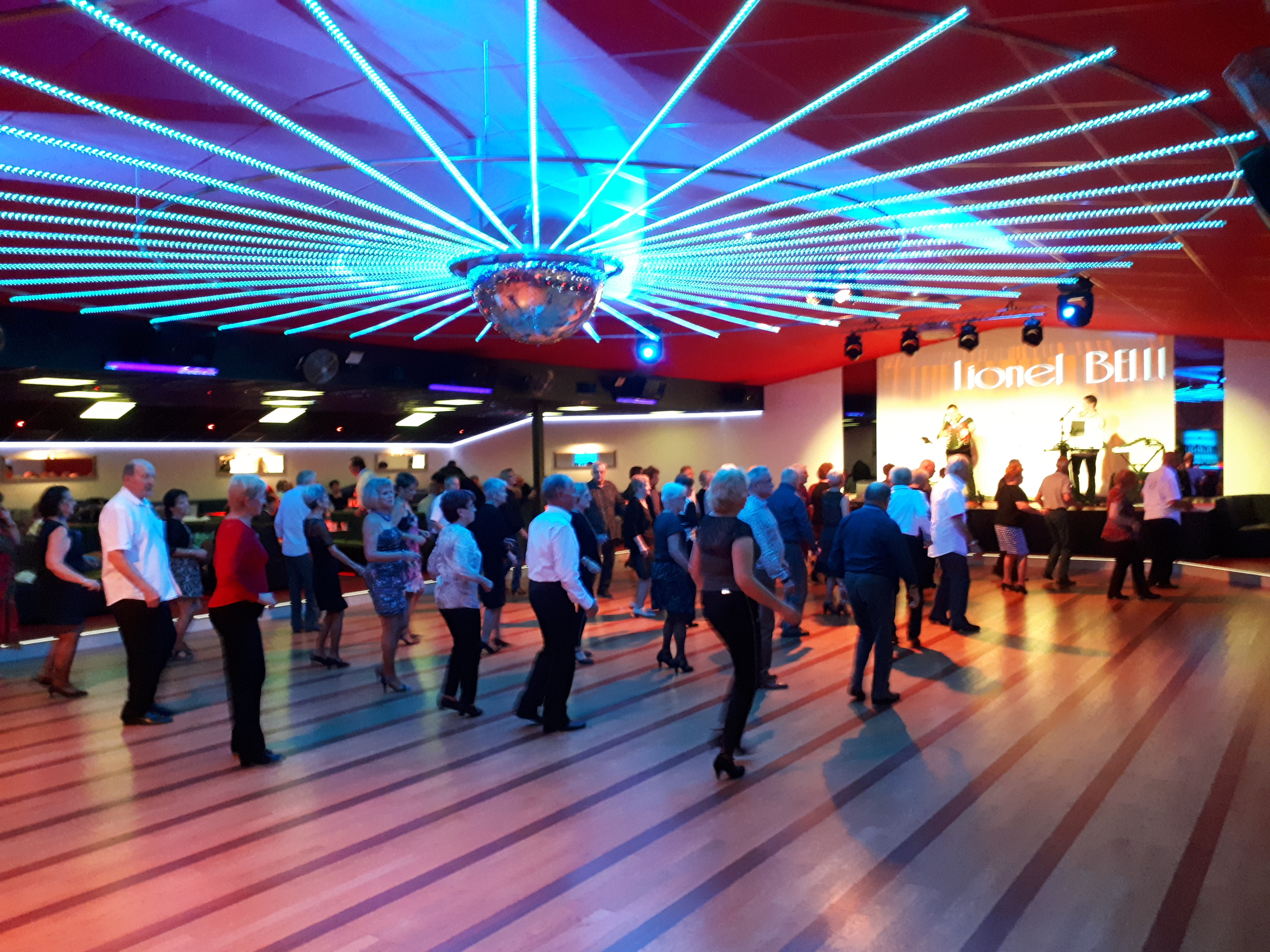
3 of 4

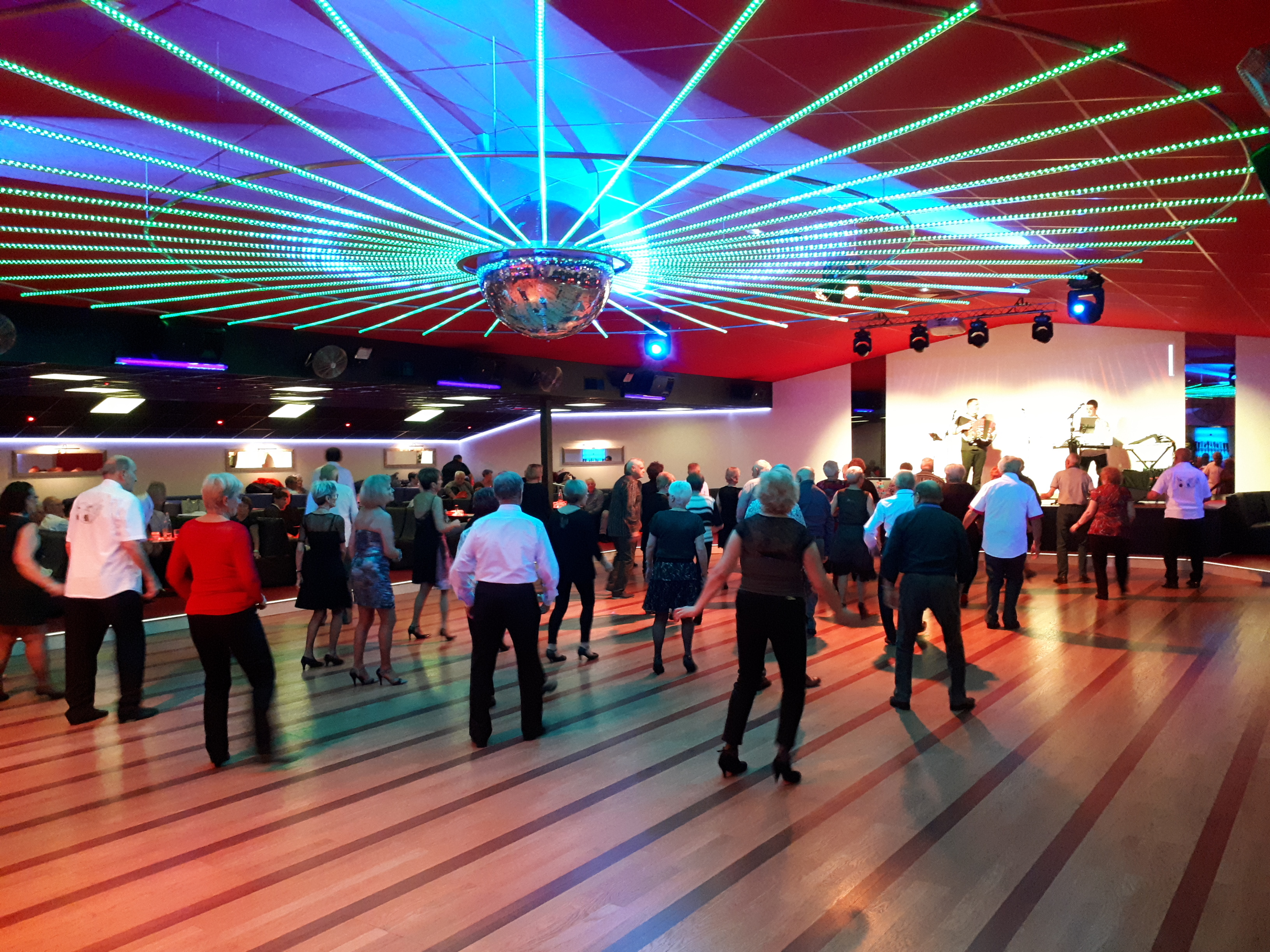
4 of 4

== Examples in motion pictures ==
A frame from the "Madison" scene of Bande à part. From left to right: Arthur (Claude Brasseur), Odile (Anna Karina), and Franz (Sami Frey).

- The dance is performed by a large group in the original (non-musical) version of John Waters' Hairspray (1988).
- In Monsieur Ibrahim (2003), Lola Naymark does a Madison-like dance at 42 minutes and at 1 hour 18 minutes a group of Turkish youth appears to be doing a facsimile of the dance as well. The song by Olivier Despax and the Gamblers is featured.
- In The Go-Getter (2007), Lou Taylor Pucci, Zooey Deschanel and Jena Malone all dance the "Madison" as an homage to Godard's Bande à part.
- The film Le Week-End (2013) ends with the main characters Nick and Morgan dancing in the midst of the café recreating the scene from Bande à part.
- Episode 3, "Other People, Other Rooms", of the Hulu miniseries 11.22.63 (2016) (based on the 2011 Stephen King novel 11/22/63) features students and Sadie Dunhill doing The Madison.
- In the Netflix series Maniac (2018) episode 5, the characters played by Rome Kanda, Emma Stone, and Jonah Hill dance the Madison.
