= She Shot a Hole in My Soul =

Single by Clifford Curry
- B-side: "We're Gonna Hate Ourselves In The Morning"
- Released: 1967
- Studio: Cinderella Sound (Nashville, Tennessee)
- Length: 2:19
- Label: Elf 90002
- Songwriters: Chuck Neese, Mac Gayden
- Producer: Buzz Cason

Clifford Curry singles chronology
"Kiss, Kiss, Kiss"	"She Shot a Hole in My Soul"	"You Turned Out The Light"

"She Shot a Hole in My Soul" was a minor hit for R&B artist Clifford Curry reaching no. 45 on the US R&B charts.

== Original recording and other releases ==
The A-side was written by Chuck Neese and Mac Gayden, and the flip side, "We're Gonna Hate Ourselves in the Morning", was written by Arthur Alexander and D. Ward. Released in 1967, it climbed up to # 45 in the R&B charts, providing a hit for Clifford Curry. The song was a regional hit in Virginia in 1967, recorded by Bob Marshall and the Crystals shortly after Curry's version was released. It was also a minor hit for Geno Washington & The Ram Jam Band. It has also been covered by the Box Tops on their 1968 Non Stop album, John Fred & His Playboy Band on their 1968 Agnes English album, and Huey Lewis and the News on their 1994 Four Chords & Several Years Ago album.

== Releases ==
- Clifford Curry - "She Shot a Hole in My Soul" / "We're Gonna Hate Ourselves in the Morning" - Elf 90002 - 1967
- Clifford Curry - "She Shot a Hole in My Soul" / "We're Gonna Hate Ourselves in the Morning" - Bell 40 - 1967
- Geno Washington & The Ram Jam Band - "She Shot a Hole in My Soul" / "I've Been Hurt by Love" - Piccadilly - 7N 35392 - 1967 The version by Washington and co. did get to into the Record Retailer Top 50 and Bubbling Under list for the week of 29 July 1967. It was in the Record Mirror Bubbling Under chart section for the week of 5 August 1967.
