= Roy Hall (musician) =

American pianist and songwriter (1922–1984)

- Roy Hall in 1955.

Background information
- Also known as: Sunny David
- Born: James Faye Hall; May 7, 1922; Big Stone Gap, Virginia, United States
- Died: March 3, 1984 (aged 61) Nashville, Tennessee, United States
- Genres: Rockabilly; rock and roll
- Occupation: Musician
- Instruments: Piano; vocals
- Years active: Early 1930s–1984
- Labels: Fortune; Citation; Bullet; Tennessee; Decca
- Formerly of: Cohutta Mountain Boys; The Eagles

James Faye "Roy" Hall (May 7, 1922 – March 3, 1984), also known by his pseudonym "Sunny David", was an American rockabilly pianist and songwriter. Hall was an uncredited co-writer of the rockabilly classic "Whole Lotta Shakin' Goin' On", a song recorded by Hall himself and later popularized by Jerry Lee Lewis. Although his writing claim was initially disputed, later reissues of the song credit Hall for his role in its conception.

== Biography ==
Hall was born in Big Stone Gap, Virginia in 1922. Although he is often stated to have learned the piano from a local blues player who also turned Hall into a drunkard by his early teens, he was actually first introduced to the instrument by his mother. Hall cited Piano Red as his primary influence in his playing style. After performing in his home town, Hall accompanied Uncle Dave Macon in 1933 in a traveling broadcast for the Grand Ole Opry.

While working for a sibling group called the Hall Brothers, the third brother, Roy Hall, died in a car accident in 1943. Hall adopted the brother's name for his stage moniker, and formed his own band, the Cohutta Mountain Boys. It was a five-piece band, with Tommy Odum (lead guitar), Bud White (rhythm guitar), Flash Griner (bass guitar), and Frankie Brumbalough (fiddle). In 1949, the band cut their first record, which included a hillbilly boogie-woogie song called "Dirty Boogie", with two different B-sides released on the independent record label, Fortune Records, in Detroit, Michigan. The single became a jukebox favorite in the Midwest; however, its followups, which delved more into traditional country music, failed to match the initial success produced by "Dirty Boogie". The Cohutta Mountain Boys' popularity earned them, briefly, a supporting role for singer Tennessee Ernie Ford in Nashville. Afterwards, the band continued a journeymen existence, eventually returning to Detroit where Hall assembled a new group, the Eagles, and recorded material for Citation Records.

However, the group could not sustain itself, and in 1950 Hall moved to Nashville to record two solo singles for Bullet Records and another for Tennessee Records in 1951; the releases were commercially unsuccessful. He then opened a music and gambling club called the Music Box, later renamed the Musicians' Hideaway, where he was a regular performer. Hall claimed that Elvis Presley performed there one night in 1954, but Hall fired him because "he weren't no damn good." He also claimed that, in the same year, Jerry Lee Lewis played there for several weeks.

Between 1954 and 1955, Hall recorded with Webb Pierce, Marty Robbins, and Hawkshaw Hawkins. In 1954, Hall met black musician Dave "Curlee" Williams. According to Hall, while on vacation in the Everglades Hall co-wrote, under the pseudonym "Sunny David", the song "Whole Lotta Shakin' Goin' On". Though his account has been disputed, Hall said:

We was down in Pahokee, on Lake Okeechobee.. out on a dam pond, fishin' and milkin' snakes .. drinkin' wine, mostly.. This guy down there had a big bell that he'd ring to get us all to come in to dinner, an' I'd call over [and] say, 'What's goin' on?' Colored guy said, 'We got twen'y-one drums, we got an old bass horn, an' they even keepin' time on a ding-dong.' See, that was the big bell they'd ring to git us t'come in.

Pierce arranged a recording session for Hall at Decca Records, and on September 15, 1955 he recorded three songs, including "Whole Lotta Shakin' Goin' On". By this time Big Maybelle had already recorded her own variation of the song for OKeh Records, which resulted in a moderate national hit.

Hall's Decca sessions were produced by Paul Cohen, who had supervised Buddy Holly's early Nashville recordings; Cohen used top studio musicians for both Hall and Holly. Perhaps the most familiar of Roy Hall's Decca records is the rockabilly number "Three Alley Cats." Hall's recording contract with Decca concluded in 1956 with no sizable hit, as a consequence of ineffective promotion.

Jerry Lee Lewis achieved a number 3 hit in 1957 with "Whole Lotta Shakin' Goin' On", instantly launching him into national prominence. Although Hall was in line for royalties, his ex-wife successfully sued for his share, and on early issues of Lewis' single Hall is not credited.

On March 3, 1984, Hall died at the age of 61 in Nashville, not long after releasing his debut album Diggin' the Boogie. In 2005, Bear Family Records released the compilation album Roy Rocks, which compiles all of Hall's released material.
