= Roscoe Shelton =

- Born: August 22, 1931; Lynchburg, Tennessee, United States
- Died: July 27, 2002 (aged 70) Nashville, Tennessee, United States
- Genres: Electric blues, Louisiana blues, R&B
- Occupation: Singer
- Instrument: Vocals
- Years active: 1949–2002
- Label: Various

Roscoe Shelton (August 22, 1931 – July 27, 2002) was an American electric blues and R&B singer. He is best remembered for his 1965 hit single "Strain on My Heart" and for his working relationships with the Fairfield Four and with Bobby Hebb. Other notable recordings include "Think It Over" and "Baby Look What You're Doin' to Me". Fred James, who produced much of Shelton's later work, noted that Shelton moved effortlessly into soul music, unlike many of his 1950s blues and R&B recording contemporaries.

== Biography ==
Shelton was born in Lynchburg, Tennessee, and raised in Nashville, Tennessee. In 1949 he joined the Fairfield Four, singing lead vocals on their gospel music recordings. He then spent four years as a draftee in the United States Air Force. Upon discharge he joined the Skylarks in 1956 and recorded for Excello's subsidiary label Nashboro Records. After the group disbanded, Shelton sang alongside and toured with both Bobby Hebb and DeFord Bailey, Jr.

In 1961 Shelton's debut album, Roscoe Shelton Sings, was released by Excello, and various singles followed, including "Strain on My Heart" (1965). The track was a Top 40 success on the Billboard R&B chart. By this time Shelton's recordings were released by Sound Stage 7, including another Top 40 hit, "Easy Going Fellow." His next album, Soul in His Music, Music in His Soul, was released in 1966, but the long gap between albums stalled his career. However, Shelton performed on the same bill as Otis Redding at the Apollo Theater.

The deaths of Redding and Sam Cooke, who had been friends of Shelton's, took their toll on him. Shelton left the music industry in 1969 and went to work for the Meharry Medical College, in Nashville. In 1994 Shelton, Earl Gaines, and Clifford Curry found work billed as the Excello Legends. In 1995, Shelton's song "You Were the Dream" was used in the soundtrack of the film Blue Juice.

Shelton resumed recording with the producer Fred James, releasing, amongst others, the album Let It Shine in 1998, and Shelton's and Gaines's joint effort Let's Work Together.

Shelton died of cancer in Nashville, in July 2002, at the age of 70.

Two years after his death, Shelton's "Say You Really Care" was included on the Grammy Award–winning compilation album Night Train to Nashville.

== Discography ==
=== Albums ===
- Roscoe Shelton Sings (Excello, 1961)
- Soul in His Music, Music in His Soul (Sound Stage 7, 1966)
- Strain on Your Heart (Charly, 1987)
- Roscoe Shelton Sings (P-Vine, 1995)
- She's the One (Appaloosa, 1996)
- Tennessee R&B Live (Appaloosa, 1997)
- Let It Shine (Black Top, 1998)
- Let's Work Together (Cannonball, 2000)

=== Singles ===
- "I've Been Faithful" / "We've Been Wrong" (1960) (Excello 2146)
- "Strain on My Heart" (1965), US R&B singles, number 25
- "Easy Going Fellow" (1966), US R&B singles, number 32

== See also ==
- List of electric blues musicians
