= Bill Coday =

American singer

Bill Coday (May 10, 1942 – June 7, 2008) was an American musician and singer.

== Career ==
Bill Coday was born in Coldwater, Mississippi, United States. As a young man he began singing in juke joints in and around Blytheville, Arkansas. Later, Coday moved to Chicago, Illinois, where he was discovered by Denise LaSalle. LaSalle signed Coday to her Crajon label, and introduced him to Willie Mitchell of Memphis, Tennessee. Mitchell's reputation in the soul and soul blues music industry includes producing such artists as Al Green and Ann Peebles. Mitchell agreed to work with Coday, and the Mitchell-Coday team produced songs such as "Sixty Minute Teaser", "I Get High on Your Love", "You're Gonna Want Me", "I'm Back to Collect", and "Get Your Lie Straight".

Coday signed with Ecko Records and recorded the album Sneakin' Back, which included the songs "Her Love Is Good Enough to Put in Collard Greens", "I Can Move the Hoochie Coochie Man" and "Doctor Thrill Good". Coday's second album with Ecko Records, Can't Get Enough, included the songs "In the Room Next to the Room", and "Not a Word". On the third album with Ecko Records, Put Me in the Mood, Coday recorded the song "We're Gonna Miss You Johnnie", which was a tribute song to Johnnie Taylor.

Bill Coday suffered a massive stroke on June 7, 2008 and died at age 66.
