= Bertram Brown =

Bertram Brown may refer to:

- Bertram S. Brown (1931–2020), American psychiatrist
- Bertram Wyatt-Brown (1932–2012), historian
- Bertram Brown (musician), see Earl Zero

== See also ==
- Bert Brown (disambiguation)
