= Herbert Browne =

Herbert Browne may refer to:

- Herbert John Charles Browne (1923–2015), British businessman
- Herbert Browne (designer) of Glen Magna Farms and Derby Summer House
- Herbert Browne (tennis), played in 1954 U.S. National Championships – Men's Singles

== See also ==
- Herbert Brown (disambiguation)
