= Alvin Brown (disambiguation) =

Alvin Brown (born 1961) is a US politician.

Alvin Brown may also refer to:

- Alvin Brown (boxer) (born 1969), American boxer
- H. Alvin Brown, namesake of H. Alvin Brown–C. C. Stroud Field

== See also ==
- Al Brown (disambiguation)
