= Hubert Brown =

Hubert Brown may refer to:

- Hubert G. Brown (born 1943), American civil rights leader
- Hubert Brown (politician), Northern Irish politician
- Hubie Brown (born 1933), American basketball coach

== See also ==
- Bert Brown (disambiguation)
