= Champion Records (Nashville, Tennessee) =

U.S. record label started in the mid-1950s

Champion Records (along with its sister labels Calvert and Cherokee) was a record label started in the mid-1950s by the songwriter and record producer Ted Jarrett, in partnership with Alan and Reynolds Bubis (formerly of the Tennessee and Republic labels). This Nashville, Tennessee-based label released records by Christine Kittrell, Gene Allison, the Fairfield Four, Earl Gaines, Larry Birdsong, Shy Guy Douglas, Jimmy Beck and Charles Walker, amongst others. Beck released a record on Champion entitled "Pipe Dreams" and another, called "Carnival" on the Zil label. Champion was out of business by 1960, and other Jarrett labels such as Valdot, Poncello, Spar and Ref-O-Ree followed. All of these companies were acquired by Bluesland Productions in the mid-1990s.
