= Del Wood =

Country music pianist

- Also known as: Del Wood
- Born: Polly Adelaide Hendricks; February 22, 1920; Nashville, Tennessee, United States
- Died: October 3, 1989 (aged 69)
- Genres: Country, honky tonk, ragtime
- Instrument: Piano
- Years active: 1951–1989
- Label: Tennessee Records
- Award: Volunteer State Music Hall of Fame - 2026

Polly Adelaide Hendricks Hazelwood (February 22, 1920 – October 3, 1989), known professionally as Del Wood, was an American pianist.

== Early life ==
Hendricks was born in Nashville, Tennessee. A lifetime resident of Nashville, she was surrounded by the influences of early country music and the remaining vestiges of ragtime, particularly through the guitar pickers. She took up piano at age five, and played ragtime, gospel, and country music. Despite her parents' best efforts to encourage a direction towards classical music, the environment in Nashville, plus the early local programming on radio, convinced her that she wanted to play piano in the honky-tonk style. Her dream goal was the Grand Ole Opry, something she would realize in her early 30s.

== Career ==
Shortening her married name (Adelaide Hazelwood) to something easier to remember, Wood began playing in bands and honky-tonk joints in her 20s. After a decade of building repertoire and reputation, she spent some time as a staff pianist at WLBJ in Bowling Green, Kentucky. It was there that she was heard playing "Down Yonder" among other pieces, which led to a gig with a recording group called Hugh "Baby" Jarrett and his Dixieliners. This led to the first of many recording sessions for the Tennessee Records label starting in 1951. "Down Yonder" soon became a national hit in both the country and pop categories in Billboard record charts, sold over one million copies, and was awarded a gold disc. She is probably the first female country solo instrumentalist to sell a million copies of a record.

This success was turned into appearances on the Grand Ole Opry starting in 1952, which led to an eventual full-time gig there in 1953, fulfilling her long-time dream. Two years later her fame culminated with a contract from RCA Victor Records, where she would make some of the first country/honky-tonk stereo recordings in the late 1950s. While nothing else that she put out had the same success as "Down Yonder", her offerings over the next decade were frequent and consistent. Wood gained the title, Queen of the Ragtime Pianists, sometimes shared with junior fellow plunker Jo Ann Castle. She was also divorced from her stage-namesake, Carson Hazelwood, during this period, but not before adopting a son they named Wesley.

In 1984, Del Wood appeared in the movie Rhinestone, starring Dolly Parton and Sylvester Stallone as the pianist in the Wild Possums Band.

=== Death ===
During the Vietnam War, Wood was part of one of the Grand Ole Opry package tours that entertained troops overseas in 1968. Her recordings after the late 1960s were infrequent at best, but her appearances on the Opry continued until just before her death from a stroke on October 3, 1989, at the age of 69.

She was interred in the Mount Olivet Cemetery in Nashville.

Wood was posthumously inducted to the Volunteer State Music Hall of Fame in 2026.
