= Alfred Brown =

Alfred Brown may refer to:

- Alfred Winsor Brown (1885–1938), governor of Guam
- Ernest Brown (British politician) (Alfred Ernest Brown, 1881–1962), British politician
- Alfred Brown (cricketer) (1854–1900), Yorkshire cricketer
- Alfred Brown (footballer) (1898–1989), Blackpool, Barnsley and Swindon Town player
- Alfred John Brown (1897–after 1919), World War I flying ace of No. 24 Squadron RAF
- Alfred Brown (missionary) (1803–1884), missionary in New Zealand
- Alfred Brown (palaeontologist) (1834–1920), South African palaeontologist, archaeologist and naturalist
- Alfred Lawson Brown (1927–2006), British professor of medieval history
- Alfred Henry Brown (1820–1908), member of the Queensland Legislative Council
- Alfred Joseph Voules Brown (1868–1955), Australian customs officer, trepanger and trader

== See also ==
- Alfred Browne (born 1959), Antigua and Barbuda Olympic sprinter
- Alfie Brown, English stand-up comedian
