= Quinn Golden =

American singer (1954–2003)

Quinton Golden

Personal details
- Born: Quinton "Quinn" Golden; October 25, 1954 Memphis, Tennessee, U.S.
- Died: July 28, 2003 (aged 48) Memphis, Tennessee, U.S.

Quinton "Quinn" Golden (October 25, 1954 – July 28, 2003) was an American soul blues, blues, and R&B singer from Memphis, Tennessee.

== Personal life ==
Quinton "Quinn" Golden was born in Memphis, Tennessee, to Bernice M. Golden. He had two sons, Kevin and Tevin. He died on July 28, 2003, at Delta Medical Center in Memphis.

== Career ==
A soul blues, blues, and R&B singer, Quinn sang with Rufus Thomas, Ollie and the Nightingales and The Bar-Kays. Later he joined the Al Green Orchestra and travelled with this group for seven years. Other entertainers that Quinn performed with included Ike Turner, Shirley Brown, Denise LaSalle, Bobby Rush and Carl Sims. During his career, Quinn also wrote songs with and/or collaborated with such artists as Carl Sims, Ollie Nightingale, Lee "Shot" Williams, Chuck Roberson, J. Blackfoot and Toni Greene. Other entertainers that Quinn worked with included Barry White, Bob Dylan and Ron Woods.

In 1990, Quinn released his first solo album, I'm Serious About Your Love, on the Traction label out of Jackson, Mississippi. In 1991, a single from this album, "Cover You With A Kiss" won several awards at the Jackson Music Awards in Jackson, Mississippi.

Later in Quinn's career, he signed with Ecko Records of Memphis, Tennessee. During his tenure with Ecko, Quinn recorded several CDs which included Cover You With A Kiss, What's The Name Of That Thang, A Little Sumpin' Sumpin', On Q., and his last release, Bottoms Up!.
