= Night Train to Nashville =

Night Train to Nashville: Music City Rhythm & Blues, 1945-1970

Compilation album by Various artists
- Released: 2004
- Recorded: Various
- Genre: Rhythm & Blues
- Label: Lost Highway Records, CMF Records
- Producer: Daniel Cooper & Michael Gray

Night Train to Nashville: Music City Rhythm & Blues, 1945-1970 is a two disc compilation of R&B songs from 1945 to 1970 recorded in Nashville, Tennessee. The compilation was spawned by an exhibit at the Country Music Hall of Fame and Museum. It won a Grammy Award for producers Michael Gray and Daniel Cooper and audio engineers Joe Palmaccio and Alan Stoker in 2005.

== Track listing ==
1. Nashville Jumps
2. Buzzard Pie
3. Skip's Boogie
4. L & N Special
5. Sittin' Here Drinking
6. Just Walkin In The Rain
7. If You And I Could Be Sweethearts
8. Baby Let's Play House
9. Christene
10. It's Love Baby (24 Hours a Day)
11. Rollin' Stone
12. You Can Make It If You Try
13. Rockin' The Joint
14. Let's Trade A Little
15. Say You Really Care
16. Somebody, Somewhere
17. Pipe Dreams
18. WLAC commercial
19. White Rose

Disc: 2

1. WLAC Air Check/Monkey Doin' Woman
2. What'd I Say
3. Really Part 1
4. Just Like Him
5. Anna (Go To Him)
6. Snap Your Fingers
7. Mama, He Treats Your Daughter Mean
8. Something Tells Me
9. Sunny
10. I Want To Do Everything For You
11. Bigger And Better
12. Since I Met You Baby
13. The Chokin' Kind
14. She Shot A Hole In My Soul
15. Gotta Get Yourself Together
16. Soul Shake
17. Reconsider Me
18. Everlasting Love
