= Back on Track (Arthur Adams album) =

Studio album by Arthur Adams
- Released: 1999
- Genre: Blues
- Label: Blind Pig
- Producer: Arthur Adams

Arthur Adams chronology
I Love Love Love My Lady (1979)	Back on Track (1999)	Soul of the Blues (2004)

Back on Track is an album by the American musician Arthur Adams, released in 1999. It was his first album in 20 years. Adams supported Back on Track with an international tour.

== Production ==
The album was produced by Adams, who also cowrote or wrote the majority of the songs. B. B. King played guitar and sang on "The Long Haul" and "Get You Next to Me"; at the time, Adams was the bandleader at King's Los Angeles club. "Rehabilitation Song" recounts Adams's time in a halfway house.

== Critical reception ==
Professional ratings
Review scores
Source	Rating
AllMusic	3/5 stars
The Commercial Appeal	3.5/4 stars
The Gazette	3.5/5 stars
The Penguin Guide to Blues Recordings	4/4 stars

The CMJ New Music Report wrote that "Adams's soulful tenor and crisp guitar solos soar passionately." The Commercial Appeal determined that, "when Adams solos on guitar, his sophisticated, jazzy tone looks equally to Little Milton and B. B. King." The Telegraph-Journal said that "Adams has a honey voice, and comes up with lots of up-tempo soul stirrers."

The Gazette praised "his soulful, gospel-tinged vocals and rocking blues band sound highlighted by his always-fluid electric guitar solos." The Santa Cruz Sentinel noted the soulful vocals and liquidy blues guitar." The Asbury Park Press listed Back on Track among the 10 best blues albums of 2000.

AllMusic wrote that Adams's "vocalizing has a sweet, soulful quality ala Robert Cray or at times Bobby Bland... And his electric six string takes definite cues from his idol, B. B. King." The Penguin Guide to Blues Recordings admired the "intelligent, adult themes."

== Track listing ==
No.	Title	Length
1.	"Back on Track"
2.	"Get You Next to Me"
3.	"Who Does She Think She Is"
4.	"The Long Haul"
5.	"No Big Deal"
6.	"Jumpin' the Gun"
7.	"You Really Got It Going On"
8.	"Good Good Good"
9.	"Rehabilitation Song"
10.	"Honda Betty"
11.	"Backup Man"
