= USS Brown (SP-1050) =

Patrol vessel of the United States Navy

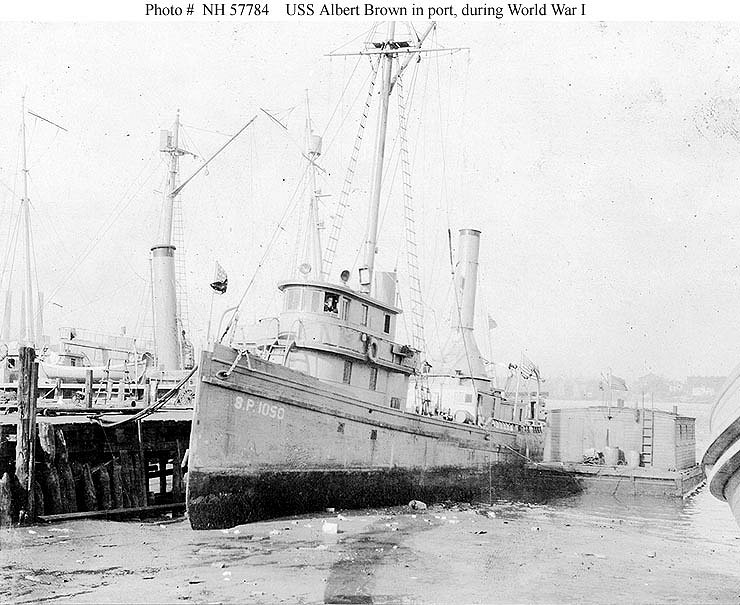
- Tied up to a pier during World War I.

History

United States
- Name: Brown
- Launched: 1875
- Acquired: 20 May 1917
- Commissioned: USS Albert Brown (SP 1050), 3 July 1917
- Renamed: Brown, 28 July 1917
- Stricken: March 1920
- Fate: Sunk, March 1920 at the Naval Air Station, Cape May, NJ

General characteristics
- Length: 103 ft (31 m)
- Propulsion: steam

The wooden-hulled tug Albert Brown was acquired by the Navy from W. P. Orr Jr., of Bristol, Maine, on 20 May 1917 and commissioned on 3 July 1917. Less than a month later, on 28 July 1917, Admiral William S. Benson, as Acting Secretary of the Navy, promulgated General Order No. 314 which decreed that all "scout patrol" vessels with compound names would hence forth be officially known by surname only. Thus Albert Brown (SP-1050) become simply Brown (SP-1050), a name she used continually throughout her commissioned service.

The 103-foot patrol and minesweeping tug, was built at Bristol, Maine, in 1875 as a steam fishing trawler. She was rebuilt in 1897 and remained active in the Menhaden fishery, operating out of Lewes, Delaware, until taken over by the Navy for World War I service. She served in the Delaware Bay area. In 1919 or early 1920, she was reported to be sunk at the Naval Air Station, Cape May, New Jersey, and was stricken from the Navy list in March 1920. After efforts to sell the wreck were unsuccessful, Albert Brown's remains were removed by Army Engineers. She was officially abandoned by the Navy in early 1923.
