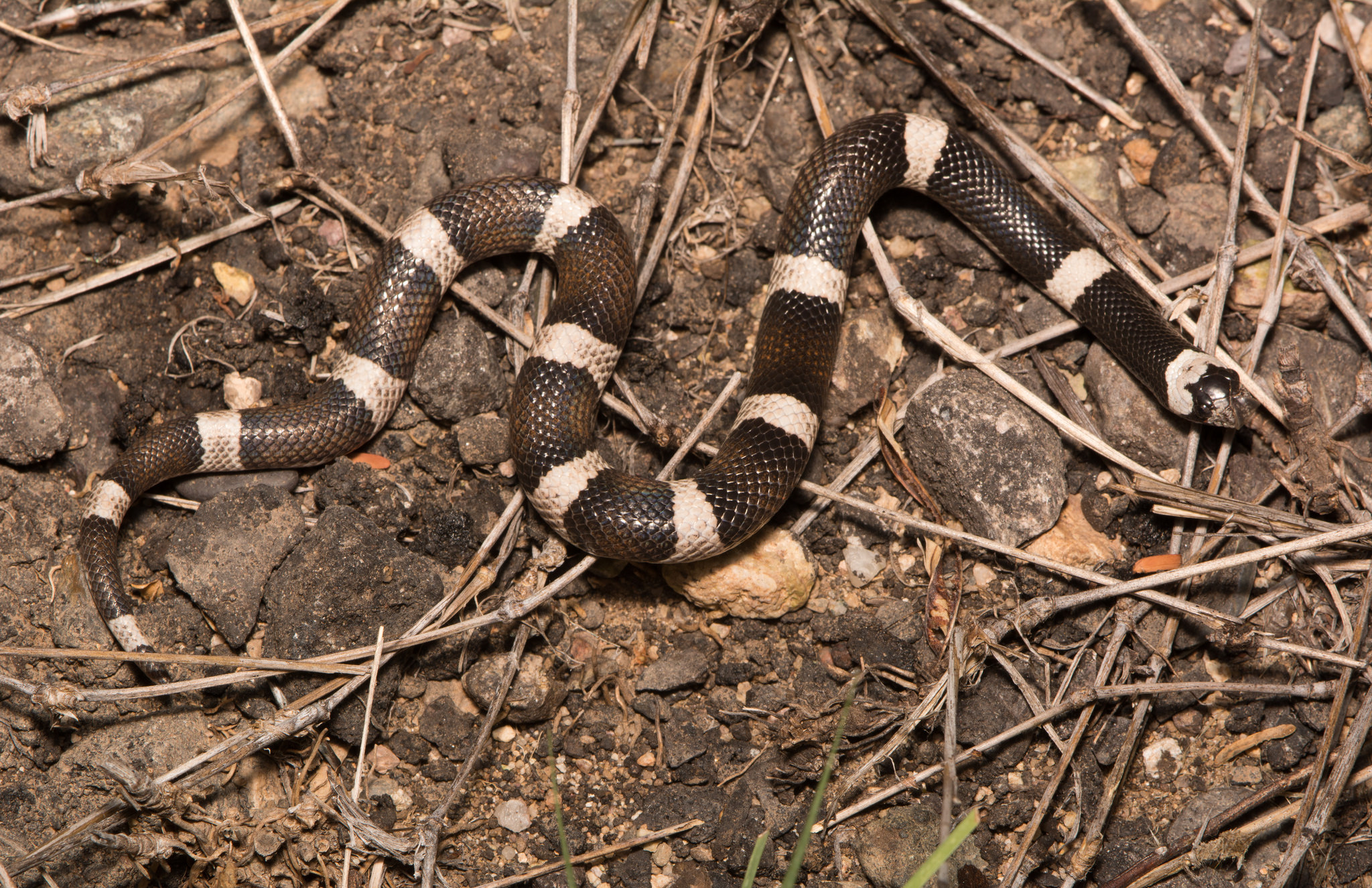
- Phyllorhychus browni

Scientific classification
- Kingdom: Animalia
- Phylum: Chordata
- Class: Reptilia
- Order: Squamata
- Suborder: Serpentes
- Family: Colubridae
- Subfamily: Colubrinae
- Genus: Phyllorhynchus; Stejneger, 1890

= Phyllorhynchus =

Genus of snakes

Phyllorhynchus is a genus of snakes in the family Colubridae. The genus is native to the southwestern United States and adjacent northwestern Mexico

== Species ==
The genus Phyllorhynchus contains two species which are recognized as being valid.

- Phyllorhynchus browni Stejneger, 1890 - saddled leafnose snake
- Phyllorhynchus decurtatus (Cope, 1868) - spotted leafnose snake

Nota bene: A binomial authority in parentheses indicates that the species was originally described in a genus other than Phyllorhynchus.

== Description ==
Snakes of the genus Phyllorhynchus are heavy-bodied, but small, 6 to 20 in (15 to 51 cm) in total length, which includes a short tail. The snout is short and shovel-like. The rostral scale is enlarged and has free lateral edges.
