= Lee "Shot" Williams =

American singer

Henry Lee "Shot" Williams (May 21, 1938 – November 25, 2011) was an American blues singer. He got the nickname "Shot" from his mother at a young age, owing to his fondness for wearing suits and dressing up as a "big shot."

== Biography ==
Williams grew up in the country close to his cousin and fellow blues man, Little Smokey Smothers. "Shot" moved to Detroit in 1954 and to Chicago in 1958. He joined Smothers there and began singing with Smokey's band in 1960 and a few years later joined Magic Sam's band as a vocalist. In 1962, Williams recorded his first singles for Chicago's Foxy label, "Hello Baby" and "I'm Trying". He recorded a series of singles for other labels, including King/Federal, Palos, Gamma, Shama and Tchula. His 1964 recording "Welcome to the Club" was a hit in Chicago, and was later covered by Little Milton for Checker Records in 1965. Another regional hit, "I Like Your Style", came out in 1969 and was covered by Junior Parker. Several more singles followed including the popular "Drop Your Laundry Baby". His first album under his own name, Country Disco, was released on the Roots label in 1977. In the 1980s, Williams released a slew of singles on labels including Tchula, 4-Way, True & Dis-Muke. He released an album on cassette with many of these cuts called I Like Your Style. In 1994, the Japanese label Vivid Sound released an album called, A Shot of Rhythm and Blues, containing tracks Williams recorded in Memphis apparently for (but not released by) Quinton Claunch's SoulTrax imprint. The Black Magic label decided to give Lee a "Shot" behind his own band. The result, Cold Shot was released in 1995 and was voted the Best Blues Album of 1995 (New Recording - Soul/Blues) by Living Blues readers' poll.

His debut for Ecko Records, Hot Shot, brought Williams home to the "Southern Soul Blues" world with the hit "I'll Take The Risk". In 2000, Williams scored another hit with She Made A Freak Out Of Me, followed by Somebody's After My Freak. Williams left the label again and recorded one disc for Charles Wilson's label called Let The Good Times Roll before returning to Ecko for four more albums.

In 2008, Williams signed with CDS Records. His first CD for the label was released in 2008 and produced the hits "It's Friday (Time To Get Paid)" and "Wrong Bed". Two more albums were released by CDS Records, I'm The Man For The Job and The First Rule of Cheating (2010).

== Death ==
Williams died on November 25, 2011, aged 73, from undisclosed causes. In 2022 the Killer Blues Headstone Project placed a headstone for Williams at Mount Hope Cemetery in Chicago.

== Discography ==
- Country Disco (Roots/TK 1977)
- A Shot Of Rhythm & Blues (Vivid Sound/Soul Trax 1994)
- Cold Shot (Black Magic 1995)
- Hot Shot (Ecko 1996)
- You Turn Me On (Diamond Lady 1999)
- She Made A Freak Out Of Me (Ecko 2000)
- Somebody's After My Freak (Ecko 2001)
- Let The Good Times Roll (Wilson 2002)
- Before The Honeymoon (Hot Spot 2002)
- Chicago Blues & Deep Soul Legend (Famous Grooves 2003)
- Get Down Tonight (Ecko 2004)
- Nibble Man (Ecko 2005)
- Starts With A P (Ecko 2006)
- Meat Man (Ecko 2006)
- Shot From The Soul (CDS 2008)
- The Best Of (Ecko 2009)
- I'm The Man For The Job (CDS 2010)
- The First Rule Of Cheating (CDS 2010)
