= Herbert Brown (cricketer) =

English cricketer (born 1867)

Herbert William Hollister Brown (born 14 December 1867) was an English cricketer from Bristol who played first-class cricket for Gloucestershire County Cricket Club between 1890 and 1894 in a career spanning sixteen matches. A bowler of unknown style and handedness, he took 36 wickets at a bowling average of 28.41.
