= Herbert Brown (ornithologist) =

American ornithologist and journalist

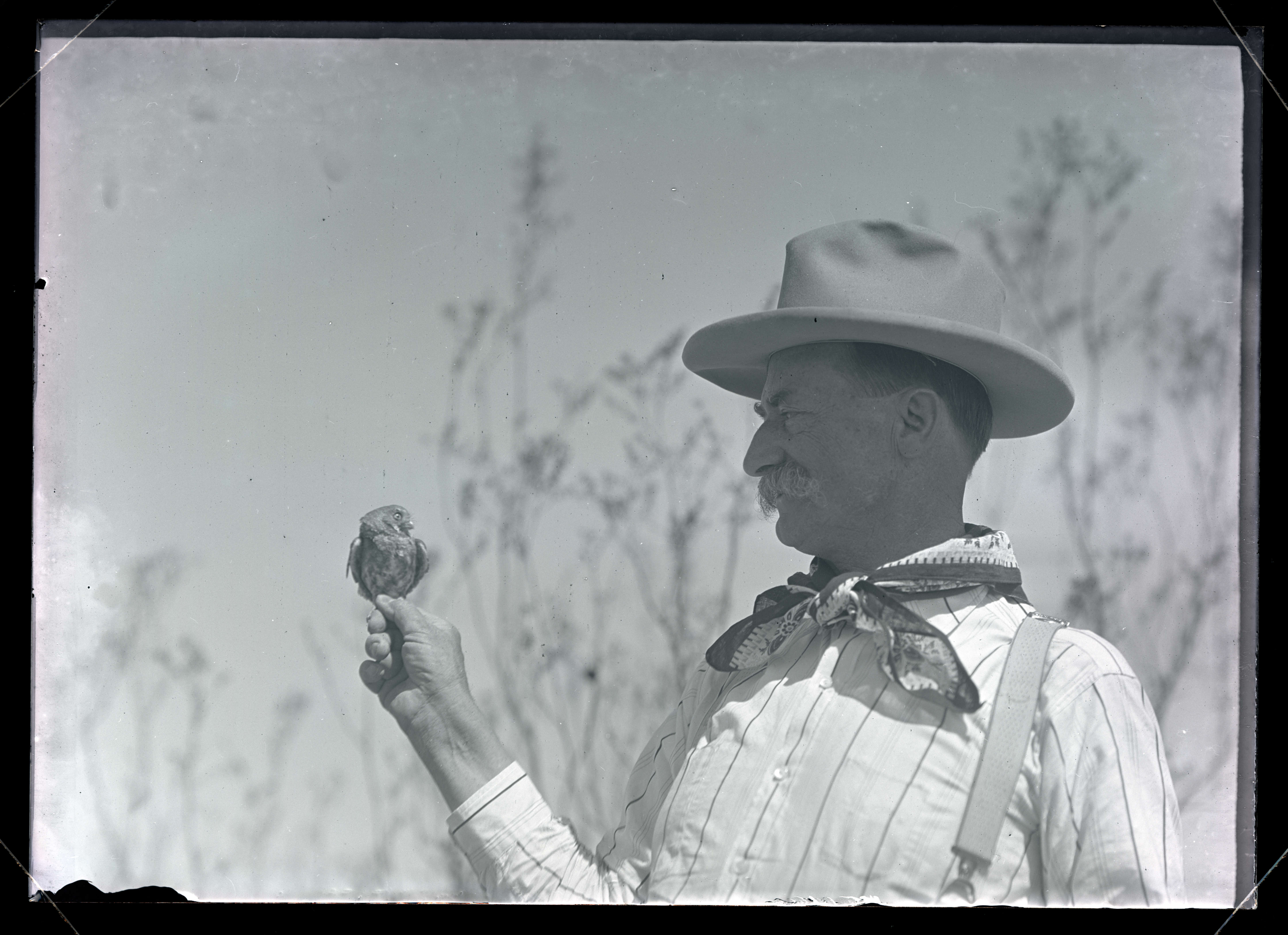
- Brown in 1910
- Born: March 6, 1848; Winchester, Virginia, U.S.
- Died: May 12, 1913 (aged 65)
- Resting place: Tucson, Arizona, U.S.
- Occupations: Ornithologist; Journalist

Herbert Brown (March 6, 1848 – May 12, 1913) was an American ornithologist and journalist who lived and worked in Arizona. He founded the Audubon Society of Arizona along with Harriet Blake and his collections of natural history specimens are now a part of the University of Arizona.

== Biography ==
Herbert Brown was born in Winchester, Virginia, and moved to Tucson to work in 1873. He worked in various industries, including timber, mining and trade, before becoming a reporter for the Arizona Daily Star in the 1870s. He then became an administrator of the Territorial Land Office but a change in the administration led to his resignation in 1886 to join the Tucson Citizen, a newspaper that he later acquired. After meeting Edward William Nelson in 1883, he took an interest in natural history and began to collect specimens of the local fauna and flora. Among his collections were specimens of birds, including those used by William Brewster to describe a new subspecies of the bobwhite quail Colinus virginianus ridgwayi. Brown also wrote in Forest and Stream, and Ornithology and Oology.

Brown was the first curator of the Arizona Territorial Museum, founded in 1893, which later became the Arizona State Museum. He resigned in 1912 and was followed by the temporary caretaker John James Thornber (1872-1962), the husband of Harriet Blake.

Brown died of a stomach cancer on May 12, 1913, and was buried at the Holy Hope cemetery in Tucson. Brown's collection of bird specimens is now at the University of Arizona.

Herbert Brown is commemorated in the scientific name of a species of North American snake, Phyllorhynchus browni.
