= Alfred Brown (cricketer) =

English cricketer

Alfred Brown (10 June 1854 – 2 November 1900) was an English first-class cricketer from Malton, North Yorkshire, England, who played two games for Yorkshire in 1872, in the home and away fixtures against Surrey. A right arm roundarm fast bowler, he took 3 wickets for 47, and scored nine runs at an average of 3.00 with a top score of 5.

He was also a chemical manure merchant, and cricket outfitter in Malton.
