= Appointment with Music =

American radio music program

Appointment with Music is a half-hour American radio music program that was broadcast on NBC beginning on June 30, 1948.

Singer Snooky Lanson headed the cast of Appointment with Music, and Dorothy Dillard was the female vocalist. The Dixie Dons quartet also performed on the show, and Owen Bradley led a 26-piece orchestra.

As the summer replacement for Jimmy Durante's program, Appointment with Music was broadcast on Wednesdays at 10:30 p.m. Eastern Time. The show's competition included Texaco Star Theater on ABC and The Whistler on CBS. The program originated from WSM in Nashville, Tennessee, and was sustaining.

== Critical response ==
A review in the trade publication Billboard described Appointment with Music's content as "tuneful and uncomplicated melody, unmixed with jive and unmarred by be-bop." The review complimented the vocal performances of Lanson, Dillard, and the Dixie Dons and commended Lanson's work as master of ceremonies.

The trade publication Variety noted in a review that the program was "a surprise departure" from WSM's "accepted, bucolic format" of country music. The review described the program as having a "soft lights, sweet music theme" and said, "Listeners in search of quiet and mental calmness will find this half-hour of song and music a welcome appeasement from the raucous quizzers."
