= It's Love Baby (24 Hours a Day) =

"It's Love Baby (24 Hours a Day)" is a song written by Ted Jarrett. The song was a number two R&B hit for Louis Brooks and His Hi-Toppers, with vocals performed by Earl Gaines, a friend of Jarrett's. The song, which also charted in 1955 for Hank Ballard's group The Midnighters and Ruth Brown, launched Jarrett's songwriting career.

It was released as a single in 1955 by Ruth Brown and reached number four on the US Billboard R&B chart. On September 10, 1955, Brooks's version and The Midnighters' version were in the top 15 at the same time, and the following week, both Brooks's version and Brown's version were in the top 15.
