= Utopia Records =

Israeli independent record label

- Founded: 2003
- Founder: Ido Yaron (DJ Ido)
- Genre: Melodic psytrance
- Country of origin: Israel
- Location: Eilat, South District
- Official website: http://www.utopia-records.com/

Utopia Records is an Israeli independent record label that specializes in producing and releasing melodic psytrance music. Utopia Records was established in 2003 by the Israeli DJ Ido Yaron. Most of the musicians signed in Utopia Records are from southern Israel. According to its website, Utopia Records' vision is to "upgrade Eilat's raves and parties while taking electronic music to the next level, in the city of freedom, nature, sea and sun." Its website also offers a mailing list, free download of one track in a month and a currently inactive online shop.

== Musicians ==
1. (Israel) Ananda Shake (Osher Swissa and Lior Edri)
  - Early works by Swissa only are titled as "Ananda"
2. (Israel) Audiotec (Miki Damski)
3. (Israel) Brain Damage (Vikenty Shagal)
4. (Israel) Mahamudra (Ran Malka, Eyal Cohen and Sagiv Ben-Giat)
5. (Israel) Phanatic (Kfir Lankry)
  - Once part of the duo Bizarre Contact with Didi Ezra
6. (Israel) Stereomatic (Eliran Maimone)
7. (Israel) Sundose (Avshalom Elmaliah and Mishel Atias)
  - Together with Osher Swissa they were the 1998 Goa trance group Psycholoop
8. (Israel) Vibe Tribe (Stas Marniansky)
9. (Israel) Spade (Elmar Ivatarov)
  - Was part of Vibe Tribe until April 2007

== DJs ==
1. (Israel) DJ Ido
2. (Portugal) DJ D.vision
3. (Belgium) DJ Firaga
4. (Mexico) DJ Kin
5. (Brazil) DJ Kitty (K.I.T.T.Y)
6. (Italy) DJ Matte
7. (Israel) DJ SubSonix

== Discography ==
=== 2003 ===
- VA – Born Again (compilation by DJ Ido)
- VA – Exodus (compilation by DJ Ido)

=== 2004 ===
- Perplex – Circles Of Life
- VA – Pure Imagination Vol. 1 (compilation by DJ Ido)
- VA – Timeless (compilation by DJ Ido)
- Audiotec – The Magic Of Love
- Vibe Tribe – Melodrama

=== 2005 ===
- Ananda Shake – Emotion In Motion
- VA – Pure Imagination 2 (compilation by Sixsense)
- Chemical Drive – Sonic Boom
- VA – Re-Start (compilation by Ananda Shake)

=== 2006 ===
- VA – Pure Imagination 3 (compilation by DJ Ido)
- Audiotec – Freak Show
- Vibe Tribe – Wise Cracks
- Phanatic – In My Head
- VA – K-Files (compilation by Danny K)
- VA – Loud & Clear (compilation by DJ Kitty, originally called "Pure Imagination 4")

=== 2007 ===
- Mahamudra – Reality Is Just A Myth
- VA – Pure Imagination 4 (compilation by DJ Ido)
- Brain Damage – Waiting For My Angel
- Ananda Shake – Inside The Sound

=== Future albums ===
- Spade's debut solo album

== See also ==
- List of record labels
