= Bert Brown (footballer) =

English footballer

Personal information
- Full name: Herbert Edward Brown
- Place of birth: Nottingham, England
- Height: 5 ft 8 in (1.73 m)
- Position: Outside right

Senior career*
Years	Team	Apps	(Gls)
	Crewe Alexandra	0	(0)
- Welbeck Colliery Welfare
1922–1923	Bradford City	6	(1)
1923–192?	Middlesbrough	0	(0)
1924–1926	York City	35	(6)
- * Club domestic league appearances and goals

Herbert Edward "Bert" Brown (fl. 1922–1926) was an English professional footballer who played as an outside right.

== Career ==
Brown was born in Nottingham. He played for Crewe Alexandra, Welbeck Colliery Welfare, Bradford City, Middlesbrough and York City. For Bradford City, he made six appearances (one goal) in the Football League, and for York City he made 35 appearances (six goals) in the Midland League.
