= Vibe Tribe =

Psytrance DJ and Music producer

- Origin: Qiryat Gat, Israel
- Genres: Psychedelic trance
- Years active: 2002-2022
- Labels: Utopia, Com.Pact
- Past members: Stas Marnyanski; Elmar Ivatarov

Vibe Tribe was the music project of Russian-born Israeli music producer Stas Marnyanski (23 March 1985 - 30 October 2022) and (formerly) Elmar Ivatarov.

Marnyanski began producing electronic-based music at age 13. After four years of experimentation and learning, he started his professional career, and began publishing tracks on various compilation releases.

The duo's debut album Melodrama was released 2004, and their second studio album, Wise Cracks, in 2006. Ivatarov left the group after the second album and continued as a solo artist, while Marnyanski continued to produce under the Vibe Tribe name.

In a 2015 interview with Psychedelic Magazine, Marnyanski recalled discovering Goa trance at the age of nine, describing it as a sound that immediately captured his imagination. He cited playing at the same event as the Prodigy as one of his most meaningful career moments.

According to his friends and acquaintances, Marnyanski died on October 30, 2022, as a result of a heart attack at the age of 37.

== Discography ==
- Melodrama (2004)
- Wise Cracks (2006)
- Destination Unknown (2009)
- Urban Legend (2011)
