= Larry Birdsong =

American singer

- Born: Lawrence E. Birdsong; June 15, 1934; Pulaski, Tennessee, United States
- Died: August 7, 1990 (aged 56) Nashville, Tennessee
- Genres: R&B, blues, jazz, pop, gospel
- Occupation: Singer
- Years active: 1955–1973
- Labels: Excello, Calvert, Vee-Jay, Champion, Home of the Blues, Sur-Speed, Ref-O-Ree

Lawrence E. Birdsong (June 15, 1934 – August 7, 1990) was an American R&B singer who recorded between the 1950s and 1970s. His biggest hit was "Pleadin' For Love", which reached the Billboard R&B chart in 1956.

== Life and career ==
He was born in Pulaski, Tennessee, into a musical family; all his brothers and sisters also sang. As a teenager, he was sent to Pikeville Reformatory School, but was discovered by Nashville music promoter Ted Jarrett, who later claimed that he managed to secure Birdsong's release from probation by signing him to a recording contract for Excello Records. He first recorded with Louis Brooks and his Hi-Toppers in 1955, and his second record, "Pleadin' For Love", reached no.11 on the R&B chart the following year. It was his only chart hit.

Birdsong then recorded for the Calvert label owned by Jarrett; one of his records, "Let's Try It Again", was leased to Decca Records without success. In 1957 he signed for Vee-Jay Records, together with another of Jarrett's protégés, Gene Allison. Although Allison found some success, Birdsong's records for Vee-Jay failed to sell. Several of his recording sessions took place at Cosimo Matassa's studio in New Orleans, with musicians including Lee Allen and Red Tyler. After he left Vee-Jay, several of his earlier recordings were issued by Jarrett in 1958 and 1959 on another of his labels, Champion. He has been described as "a very versatile singer, who recorded blues, doowop, jazz, gospel, rock n roll, smooth crooning and soul."

In 1961, Birdsong recorded for the Home of the Blues record label in Memphis, where he was produced by Willie Mitchell. On some recordings his backing group was credited as the Larryettes. However, commercial success still eluded him, and he did not record again until signing for the Sur-Sound label owned by Red Wortham in 1966. In the late 1960s he recorded for the Ref-O-Ree label, again owned by Ted Jarrett. His only recording after 1973 was a gospel single, "I Felt Alright", in 1981.

He died in Nashville in 1990, at the age of 56.
