= Gene Allison =

American R&B singer (1934–2004)

Versie Eugene Allison (August 29, 1934 – February 28, 2004) was an American R&B singer.

Allison was born in Pegram, Tennessee, and he grew up in Nashville, Tennessee singing in the church choir with his brother Leevert. As a teenager, Allison was offered a chance to sing with The Fairfield Four and, later, The Skylarks. Record producer Ted Jarrett signed Allison to Calvert Records to record secular music; soon after Jarrett got a recording contract for him with Vee-Jay Records along with Larry Birdsong. Allison's debut single was "You Can Make It If You Try", written by Jarrett and released in 1957; it became a hit in the U.S., where it entered the Billboard Hot 100 chart in early 1958.

Allison would go on to score two more hit singles at the end of the 1950s, and the success of "You Can Make It If You Try" allowed him to open a 24-hour soul food restaurant called Gene's Drive-In in Nashville. Allison continued to perform well beyond his brief period of fame. He died of kidney failure, in Nashville, at age 69 in February 2004.

== Singles ==
Year	Title	Chart Positions	
Year	Title	U.S. Pop	U.S. R&B
1958	"You Can Make It If You Try"	36	3
1958	"Everything Will Be Alright"	-	19
1958	"Have Faith"	73	11
