= You Can Make It If You Try =

Single by Gene Allison
- Released: 1958
- Songwriter: Ted Jarrett

"You Can Make It If You Try" is a song written by Ted Jarrett and recorded by Gene Allison in 1957. In 1958, Allison's recording peaked at No. 3 on the U.S. R&B singles chart, and at No. 36 or at No. 37 (sources differ) on the U.S. pop singles chart in Billboard magazine.

The song has been covered by other artists, including the Rolling Stones (on their 1964 self-titled debut album), Gene Vincent (on his 1971 album The Day the World Turned Blue) and Buddy Guy (on his 1980 album Breaking Out).
