= Al Brown's Tunetoppers =

Al Brown's Tunetoppers was a band led by Alphonso Brown (May 22, 1929 – March 19, 2009), who had success in 1960 with a dance tune "The Madison" on Amy Records. The dance calls were by Cookie Brown. Although they were successful in record sales, it competed with Ray Bryant's version with Columbia Records, who titled his version "Madison Time" with calls by Eddie Morrison. Dickey Doo & The Don'ts, fronted by Gerry Granahan and with a 1958 hit "No Chemise Please", also released a version of "The Madison" on a United Artists album. Al Brown's version of "The Madison" peaked at #23 on the Billboard Charts.

== Members ==
- Al Brown (tenor saxophone)
- Charles Brown (alto saxophone and trumpet)
- Donald Brown (trumpet)
- Neagrafton Martin (guitar)
- Andrew Walker (bass)
- Orney Pate (drums)
- Sir Thomas Hurley (piano)

== Discography ==
"The Tunetoppers at the Madison Dance Party" was released on vinyl in 1960.

No.	Title	Length
1.	"Madison Party, Part One"	3:51
2.	"Madison Party, Part Two"	4:15
3.	"Hit It and Go"	2:26
4.	"Scotty"	5:15
5.	"The Madison"	2:36
6.	"Mo' Madison"	3:56
7.	"Madison Jr."	3:58
8.	"Your Call"	5:34
9.	"Madison Jam"	4:40
Total length:		36:26

On the vinyl release, tracks 1–5 were on side A, and 6–9 were on side B.
