= Tennessee Records =

American record label

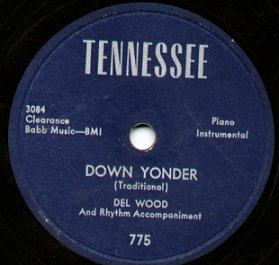

Tennessee Records was a mid-20th century United States–based record label, headquartered in Nashville, Tennessee.

Tennessee mostly released country music, but the label's biggest hit was "Down Yonder", a ragtime piano performance by Del Wood in 1950. Other Tennessee Records performers included Edgar Clayton, Helen Carter, Roy Hall, Snooky Lanson and Mississippi Slim.

Tennessee Records (along with the Republic label) was owned by Alvin and Reynolds Bubis. Legendary songwriter and producer Ted Jarrett was head of A&R. The labels were out of business by the mid-1950s when the three men went into partnership to start the Calvert-Champion-Cherokee group of labels. Those labels were defunct by 1960 and the Bubis Brothers got out of the music business. Ted Jarrett continued on with his Valdot, Poncello, Ref-O-Ree and Tee-Jaye labels, remaining active in the music business until his death in 2009. The Tennessee and Republic catalogs are now owned jointly by Bluesland Productions and SnailWorx/S. Cargo Productions.

== See also ==
- List of record labels
