= Don Rich (swamp pop singer) =

American singer-songwriter

- Born: Donald Joseph Richard; July 23, 1952; Pierre Part, Louisiana, U.S.
- Occupations: Singer; Songwriter; Musician
- Years active: 1967–Present
- Musical career
- Genres: Swamp pop
- Instruments: keyboards; guitar; drums; fiddle; saxophone; bass; accordion; vocals
- Labels: Party Time; Jin Records
- Award: Louisiana Music Hall of Fame (2018)

Don Rich (real name Donald Joseph Richard, pronounced ree-shard in the Cajun French manner) (born July 23, 1954) is an American south Louisiana swamp pop singer. Rich is an ethnic Cajun.

Although younger than the original generation of swamp pop artists such as Johnnie Allan, Rod Bernard, and Warren Storm, Rich has successfully worked his way into a more popular scene of swamp pop musicians. Along with Van Broussard, he is known for the continued popularity of swamp pop on the east side of the Atchafalaya Basin, particularly in Louisiana parishes such as Ascension, Assumption, Terrebonne and Lafourche. Moreover, he has contributed to the resurgence of the genre in general, both in Louisiana and abroad.

Rich performs almost solely in southeastern Acadiana and has recorded several albums for Floyd Soileau's Jin Records of Ville Platte, Louisiana. For many years he was a mainstay at Chilly Willy's on Lake Verret every Sunday night. Rich infuses both his swamp pop recordings and live performances with soul, rhythm and blues, and country and western influences.

== Other sources ==
- Shane K. Bernard, Swamp Pop: Cajun and Creole Rhythm and Blues (Jackson: University Press of Mississippi, 1996). ISBN 0-87805-876-1
