= Elton Anderson =

American Swamp pop singer

Elton Anderson (February 9, 1930 – November 13, 1984) was an American singer and swamp pop pioneer who had a chart hit on Mercury Records.

Anderson was born in Ville Platte, Louisiana, United States. From 1956 to 1957, Anderson was the featured vocalist of the Sid Lawrence Band while that band was the house band at The Southern Club, an Opelousas, Louisiana establishment which held a central place in establishing swamp pop as a genre. Managed by Wayne Shuler, Eddie Shuler's son, Anderson had a regional hit on the Vin label in 1959 with "Shed So Many Tears". A subsequent 1960 recording for Vin entitled "Secret of Love" b/w "Cool Down Baby" was leased to Mercury. Backed by the Sid Lawrence Combo, this single appeared on the Billboard Hot 100 for four weeks beginning January 25, 1960, peaking at number 88. A week after appearing on the pop chart, it appeared on the R&B chart, reaching number 22 but only appearing for three weeks. A follow-up single entitled "Please Accept My Love" composed by Jimmy Wilson performed poorly, and Anderson was dropped by Mercury.

In 1962, his recording "Life Problem" was originally issued on Lee Lavergne's Lanor Records, but was leased to Capitol Records for national exposure. Billboard reviewed the single positively as a "salty rock ballad." Capitol released one more Elton Anderson single before dropping him because of poor sales, although Shuler felt Capitol's promotion of Anderson's records was unsatisfactory. After Capitol released him, Shuler and Lavergne issued additional Anderson material on Lanor, but soon after this Anderson left Shuler's management and relocated to California.

Anderson was also a songwriter, and had at least one of his songs recorded by Lonnie Brooks.

He died in November 1984 in Ville Platt, Louisiana.
