= The Honey Drippers =

The Honey Drippers or The Honeydrippers may refer to:

- The Honeydrippers, 1980s British-American rock band
- The Honey Drippers, a soul band, led by Roy C, that recorded the 1973 song "Impeach the President"
- Joe Liggins and his Honeydrippers, a jump band led by Joe Liggins, active during the 1940s and 1950s, that recorded the 1945 song "The Honeydripper"
- (Jim Smoak &) The Louisiana Honeydrippers, a cajun/bluegrass band.

== See also ==
- The Honeydrippers: Volume One, a 1984 EP by the rock band
- The Honeydripper (disambiguation)
- Honeydripper (film), a 2007 film by John Sayles
