= List of Canadian number-one albums of 1984 =

These are the Canadian number-one albums of 1984. The charts were compiled and published by RPM every Saturday.

== Number-one albums ==
†	This indicates the best performing album of the year.

Issue date	Album	Artist	Ref
January 7	Colour by Numbers	Culture Club	
January 14	Colour by Numbers	Culture Club	
January 21	Colour by Numbers	Culture Club	
January 28	Colour by Numbers	Culture Club	
February 4	Colour by Numbers	Culture Club	
February 11	Colour by Numbers	Culture Club	
February 18	Colour by Numbers	Culture Club	
February 25	Colour by Numbers	Culture Club	
March 3	Thriller	Michael Jackson	
March 10	Thriller	Michael Jackson	
March 17	Thriller	Michael Jackson	
March 24	Colour by Numbers	Culture Club	
March 31	Colour by Numbers	Culture Club	
April 7	Thriller	Michael Jackson	
April 14	Thriller	Michael Jackson	
April 21	Thriller	Michael Jackson	
April 28	Thriller	Michael Jackson	
May 5	1984	Van Halen	
May 12	Footloose	Soundtrack	
May 19	Footloose	Soundtrack	
May 26	Footloose	Soundtrack	
June 2	Footloose	Soundtrack	
June 9	She's So Unusual	Cyndi Lauper	
June 16	She's So Unusual	Cyndi Lauper	
June 23	She's So Unusual	Cyndi Lauper	
June 30	Footloose	Soundtrack	
July 7	Born in the U.S.A. †	Bruce Springsteen	
July 14	Born in the U.S.A. †	Bruce Springsteen	
July 21	Born in the U.S.A. †	Bruce Springsteen	
July 28	Born in the U.S.A. †	Bruce Springsteen	
August 4	Born in the U.S.A. †	Bruce Springsteen	
August 11	Born in the U.S.A. †	Bruce Springsteen	
August 18	Born in the U.S.A. †	Bruce Springsteen	
August 25	Purple Rain	Prince and The Revolution	
September 1	Purple Rain	Prince and The Revolution	
September 8	Purple Rain	Prince and The Revolution	
September 15	Purple Rain	Prince and The Revolution	
September 22	Purple Rain	Prince and The Revolution	
September 29	Purple Rain	Prince and The Revolution	
October 6	Purple Rain	Prince and The Revolution	
October 13	Purple Rain	Prince and The Revolution	
October 20	Purple Rain	Prince and The Revolution	
October 27	Purple Rain	Prince and The Revolution	
November 3	Purple Rain	Prince and The Revolution	
November 10	Purple Rain	Prince and The Revolution	
November 17	Purple Rain	Prince and The Revolution	
November 24	Purple Rain	Prince and The Revolution	
December 1	Purple Rain	Prince and The Revolution	
December 8	Purple Rain	Prince and The Revolution	
December 15	Purple Rain	Prince and The Revolution	
December 22	Volume One	The Honeydrippers	
December 29	Volume One	The Honeydrippers	

== See also ==
- List of Canadian number-one singles of 1984
