= The Swamp Boogie Queen =

Studio album by Katie Webster
- Released: 1988
- Genre: Blues
- Length: 41:52
- Label: Alligator
- Producer: Bruce Iglauer, Ice Cube Slim

Katie Webster chronology
The Many Faces of Katie Webster (1987)	The Swamp Boogie Queen (1988)	Two-Fisted Mama! (1989)

The Swamp Boogie Queen is an album by the American musician Katie Webster, released in 1988. It was her first album for Alligator Records and her first with distribution throughout the United States and Canada. Webster supported the album with North American and European tours.

== Production ==
The album was produced by Bruce Iglauer and Ice Cube Slim. Webster was backed by the Silent Partners on most of the tracks. The Memphis Horns contributed to a few tracks, as did the Paladins. Kim Wilson played harmonica and sang on the cover of Johnnie Taylor's "Who's Making Love?", which also featured Robert Cray on guitar. "Try a Little Tenderness" is a cover of the song written and originally performed by Otis Redding, Webster's former employer. "Hold On to What You Got" is a version of the song by Joe Tex. "Sea of Love" is a cover of the 1959 Phil Phillips song, on which Webster also played. "Black Satin" is an instrumental. Webster duetted with Bonnie Raitt on "Somebody's On Your Case".

== Critical reception ==
Professional ratings
Review scores
Source	Rating
AllMusic	4/5 stars
The Cincinnati Post	4.5/5 stars
The Grove Press Guide to the Blues on CD	3/5 stars
Lincoln Journal Star	4/5 stars
MusicHound Blues: The Essential Album Guide	3.5/5 stars
Oakland Tribune	3/4 stars
The Penguin Guide to Blues Recordings	3.5/4 stars
Rolling Stone	3.5/5 stars
The Times	3/4 stars
The Virgin Encyclopedia of the Blues	3/5 stars

The St. Petersburg Times stated that "Webster's boogie-woogie piano style is highlighted by the dexterity of her left hand, which can pound out dense, bass-heavy boogie riffs that many pianists would find difficult with both hands." The Gazette said that "Webster's spicy musical stew of blues, gospel, soul, R&B and Louisiana stomp is a perfect vehicle for her unaffected, heartfelt singing." The Whig-Standard noted that the album "isn't any of your glossy Motown stuff but the earthy, sexy soul you never hear in any movie soundtrack."

The Press of Atlantic City called The Swamp Boogie Queen "the finest and most consistent blues album yet to be available in 1988." The Lincoln Journal Star said that Webster's "piano playing, a super mix of gospel, blues, jazz and boogie woogie, is a welcome break from the guitar-oriented world of the blues." The Herald labeled Webster "the essence of heartfelt Southern music-making." The Cincinnati Post deemed the album "one of the year's best blues LPs". The Times praised Webster's "gospel-influenced backwater blues style".

== Track listing ==
No.	Title	Length
1.	"Who's Making Love?"
2.	"Sea of Love"
3.	"Black Satin"
4.	"After You Get Rid of Me"
5.	"Fa-Fa-Fa-Fa-Fa (Sad Song)"
6.	"No Bread, No Meat"
7.	"Whoo-Wee Sweet Daddy"
8.	"Try a Little Tenderness"
9.	"Hold On to What You Got"
10.	"Somebody's On Your Case"
11.	"On the Run"
12.	"Lord, I Wonder"
