= Louisiana Music Hall of Fame =

Non-profit hall of fame based in Baton Rouge, Louisiana, USA

The Louisiana Music Hall of Fame (LMHOF) is a non-profit hall of fame based in Baton Rouge, the capital of the U.S. state of Louisiana, that seeks to honor and preserve the state's music culture and heritage and to promote education about the state's unique role in contributing to American indigenous and popular music in the 20th century.

== Overview of Louisiana's Music ==
Among the over 250 artists who have been inducted into the Louisiana Music Hall of Fame to date are Fats Domino, Jerry Lee Lewis, Little Richard, Dave Bartholomew, Elvis Presley, Johnny Rivers, Lloyd Price, Lead Belly, Cosimo Matassa, Louis Armstrong, Mahalia Jackson, Pete Fountain, Buddy Guy, Gov. Jimmie Davis, Ellis Marsalis, Webb Pierce, Dale Hawkins, Louis Prima, Percy Sledge, Irma Thomas, Roy Brown, "Dr. John" Mac Rebennack, Jelly Roll Morton, Allen Toussaint, Al "Carnival Time" Johnson, Bill Conti, Tim McGraw, Trace Adkins, Hunter Hayes, Hank Williams Sr. & Jr., and Clarence "Frogman" Henry.

== Exhibits ==
The Louisiana Music Hall of Fame has launched an LMHOF "Multimedia Virtual Museum" online concept.

In July 2015 the LMHOF launched the "LMHOF Wall Of Fame at BTR," a double-sided display consisting of 43 Gold records accompanied by artwork honoring 43 LMHOF Inductee members and accompanying dual 50" ultra-flat LED screens giving points of the history of the 43 artists in the Baton Rouge Metro Airport public area.

In the future, the Louisiana Music Hall of Fame has plans to open larger displays featuring more complex Gold record presentations as well as displays featuring artifacts in display of Inductee members in as many as three more locations across the state and a full blown museum display in Baton Rouge or New Orleans, the home of America's music.

== History ==
The Louisiana Music Hall of Fame's institutional history began in 1979 when, with help from Mike Shepherd, Del Moon, a Baton Rouge print and television entertainment journalist first put forward his intent to create the LMHOF. In 1980, a corporation was formed, nonprofit status obtained and the initial project drive began. After several years, Moon back shelved the full-time pursuit of the project, having fought a severe economic recession and having received only cursory cooperation from State and local government and funding entities. Moon allowed the corporation to be dissolved and public work diminished around 1997.

Over the years, Moon and Shepherd continued to conceive a better approach from another State while an early adviser in Louisiana continued on with the project's development and archival activities.

In 2005, after several years of pre-development and archival effort, that early adviser, a music industry veteran, Mike Shepherd of Baton Rouge La., established a new corporation with IRS 501c3 certification, re-acquired use of The Louisiana Music Hall Of Fame name from Louisiana's Secretary Of State, and contacted Moon for continued support and active participation.Shepherd subsequently reacquired clear registration of the trade name "The Louisiana Music Hall Of Fame" from the newly elected and sitting Louisiana Secretary of State Tom Schedler in early 2011.

In 2009 LMHOF facilitated pro bono an advertising endorsement agreement between Al "Carnival Time" Johnson and the Louisiana Lottery Corporation which resulted in media exposure and royalties to Johnson for use of his image, voice and signature song in a scratch ticket promotion during Mardi Gras season.

Over 100 fundraising induction concerts have been staged to date, including "Louisiana's Greatest Hits-Live" held in Baton Rouge on October 27, 2007 and the Louisiana Music Homecoming on May 16, 2010.

In the 2010 Session of the Louisiana Legislature, by unanimous vote of both the State Senate and State House of Representatives on SCR 112, The Louisiana Music Hall Of Fame, was commended for its work and further declared as "the official honors and recognition organization and information resource for and about Louisiana's music, musicians and musical heritage," thus becoming the first ever Official Louisiana Music Hall Of Fame after thirty years.

On January 27, 2014, The Louisiana Music Hall Of Fame web site reached the 1,000,000 visit plateau and in October 2015 reached 2.35 Million visits, and it currently stands at over 2.85 Million visits, to date.

As the pandemic passed, The Louisiana Music Hall Of Fame temporarily lost its IRS 501c3 certification, only to regain it in 2023.

== Inductees ==
Name and Date Inducted

- Louis Armstrong - December 7, 2008
- Bag of Donuts - March 13, 2019
- Marcia Ball - 2012
- Dave Bartholomew - November 8, 2009
- Harold Battiste - November 7, 2010
- BeauSoleil - October 16, 2011
- Tab Benoit - May 16, 2010
- Rod Bernard - January 29, 2012
- Kix Brooks - July 13, 2013
- The Boswell Sisters - April 13, 2008
- James Burton - August 22, 2009
- Bobby Charles - October, 2007
- Chubby Carrier - October 16, 2011
- Clifton Chenier - June 25, 2011
- Jay Chevalier - December 7, 2008
- Jimmy Clanton - April 14, 2007
- Bill Conti - April 22, 2008
- Lee Cole - March 13, 2019
- Cowboy Mouth - May 14, 2011
- Floyd Cramer - December 7, 2008
- James "Sugarboy" Crawford - November 7, 2010
- Dale & Grace - October 27, 2007
- Dash Rip Rock - January 7, 2012
- Jimmie Davis - October 27, 2007
- The Dixie Cups - April 14, 2007
- Fats Domino - October 2007
- Elvis Presley 2013
- D J Fontana 2013
- Frankie Ford - May 16, 2010
- Pete Fountain - March 18, 2007
- John Fred - April 14, 2007
- Playboy Band - May 16, 2010
- Mickey Gilley - August 28, 2011
- Henry Gray 2013
- Buddy Guy - April 16, 2008
- Dale Hawkins - October 27, 2007
- Clarence "Frogman" Henry - April 14, 2007
- Al Hirt - November 7, 2009
- Leigh "Lil Queenie" Harris - February 23, 2019
- Slim Harpo - September 25, 2011
- Hunter Hayes - September 7, 2012
- Dick Holler - October 27, 2007
- Johnny Horton - August 22, 2009
- Mahalia Jackson - December 7, 2008
- Al "Carnival Time" Johnson - April 14, 2007
- George Jones - October 3, 2011
- Kidd Jordan - November 7, 2010
- Ernie K-Doe - August 2, 2009
- Luther Kent - November 18, 2011
- Doug Kershaw - October 9, 2009
- Sammy Kershaw - December 7, 2008
- Bobby Kimball - May 16, 2010
- Jean Knight - October 27, 2007
- Ronnie Kole - November 4, 2012
- Sonny Landreth - October 25, 2012
- Lead Belly - December 7, 2008
- LeRoux - October 10, 2009
- Jerry LaCroix - January 29, 2012
- Jerry Lee Lewis - June 4, 2008
- Stan Lewis - August 22, 2009
- Chris LeBlanc - April 22, 2019
- Lillian Axe - May 16, 2010
- Little Richard - May 30, 2009
- Little Walter Jacobs 2013
- Louisiana Hayride - August 22, 2009
- LSU Tiger Band - September 11, 2009
- Master P - July 4, 2013
- Cosimo Matassa - October 27, 2007
- Dennis McGee - December 11, 2011
- Gerry McGee - December 11, 2011
- Tim McGraw - August 3, 2012
- Tommy McLain - October 27, 2007
- Ellis Marsalis - December 7, 2008
- Jelly Roll Morton - December 7, 2008
- Gregg Martinez - April 22, 2019
- D. L. Menard - October 9, 2009
- S J Montalbano - February 7, 2012
- John Moore - April 24, 2008
- Kenny Neal - September 25, 2011
- Jimmy C Newman - October 9, 2009
- Randy Newman - February 11, 2011
- Aaron Neville - December 12, 2010
- Neville Brothers - January 7, 2012
- Joe Osborn - June 12, 2010
- Robert Parker - April 14, 2007
- Phil Phillips - October 27, 2007
- Potliquor - October 20, 2012
- Queen Ida Guillory - April 26, 2013
- Webb Pierce - October 27, 2007
- Lloyd Price - March 9, 2010
- Louis Prima - December 7, 2008
- Wardell Quezergue - November 7, 2010
- The Radiators - June 10, 2011
- Eddy Raven - September 14, 2012
- Mac Rebennack - December 28, 2007
- River Road - May 14, 2011
- Johnny Rivers - June 12, 2009
- John Schneider - January 29, 2019
- Mike Shepherd - December 1, 2013
- Eddie Shuler - May 11, 2013
- Benny Spellman - August 2, 2009
- Lucas Spinosa - April 22, 2019
- Percy Sledge - May 11, 2007
- Jo El Sonnier - October 9, 2009
- Joe Stampley - October 9, 2010
- Warren Storm - September 10, 2010
- Irma Thomas - April 14, 2007
- Luke Thompson - October 27, 2011
- Wayne Toups - October 13, 2011
- Allen Toussaint - August 2, 2009
- Wilson "Willie Tee" Turbinton - April 14, 2007
- The Uniques - October 9, 2010
- Vince Vance - November 28, 2010
- Larry Williams - February 9, 2014
- Lucinda Williams - September 16, 2013
- Gregg Wright - 2013
- Zebra - July 10, 2010

=== Songwriters Annex Members ===
- Andrew Bernard
- Tony Haselden
- Casey Kelly
- Huey P. Long & Castro Carazo
- Leon Medica
- Cyril Vetter

=== Performers Stage Members ===
- Charles Connor
- Paul Ferrara

=== Studio Room Members ===
- Bill Johnston
- Larry McKinley
- Paul Marks
- Eddie Shuler

=== Regional Hall of Fame Members ===
Baton Rouge

- Clutch
- C'Vello
- The Dots
- Henry Gray
- The Inn Crowd
- Shotgun LeBoa & the Livestock Show
- Raful Neal
- Rudi Richard
- Lee Tillman
- Debbie Traylor
- Zaemon

New Orleans

- Lenny Capello
- Joe Clay
- Benny Grunch
- Little Freddie King
- J J Muggler Band
- Eddie Powers
- Randy Jackson (Zebra)
- Coco Robicheaux
- Ernie Vincent
- Walter "Wolfman" Washington

Acadiana

- Bas Clas
- Boogie Kings
- Cookie and his Cupcakes
- Sheryl Cormier
- T K Hulin
- Jivin' Gene Bourgeois
- Iry LeJeune
- Charles Mann
- Belton Richard
- G G Shinn
- Lil' Buck Senegal
- Willie Tee Trahan

North Louisiana

- Bill Brent
- Al Ferrier

=== LMHOF Future Famers Members ===
- Glen David Andrews
- L'Angelus
- Amanda Shaw
- Chase Tyler

=== LMHOF Special Members ===
- Steve Cropper
- Jimmy Hall
- Jimi Jamison
- Mickey Montalbano
- Jim Peterik

== See also ==
- List of music museums
