= Tomorrow's Hits =

Tomorrow's Hits may refer to:

- Tomorrow's Hits (The Men album)
- Tomorrow's Hits (Vee-Jay Records album)
