= Lanor Records =

American record label

- Country of origin: United States
- Location: Louisiana

Lanor Records is an American record label based in the French region of Louisiana. It is known for its issues of Cajun and zydeco music.

Lee Lavergne began to record musicians local to his home in Church Point, Louisiana after he was returned from army service in Korea. The label was formed in 1960 as a secondary endeavor to Lavergne's job as a grocery clerk. Lavergne deeply wanted to be in the music business, but didn't think he could make it as a performer or a disk jockey. He became a fan of local cajun and rhythm and blues musicians, and decided he wanted to produce and release records. Initially he was discouraged from entering the record business by those he first worked with, but Lavergne decided to begin even if prospects were poor. Lanor's first release was by Shirley Bergeron in May 1960, its entire run of 2000 copies sold and immediately established Lanor as a viable ongoing entity. He supervised his own recording sessions that took place at Crowley and New Orleans, gaining experience and better technical results as time passed. The first Lanor album was also by Shirley Bergeron, entitled "The Sounds Of Cajun Music". This first album was successful, but a second album by Bergeron had disappointing sales.

While promoting Bergeron's discs, Lavergne became acquainted with individuals in the rock and rhythm and blues promotion, and he began recording those genres. The label's first true hit was 1962's "Life Problem" by Elton Anderson. Capitol Records picked up the record for national distribution, and signed with Lanor for further recordings, but the agreement lasted only a short while, and then Anderson unexpectedly quit altogether. Recordings by Charles Mann, who sold very well in Louisiana and Texas, and Billy Matte provided further profitability. Lanor moved into the blues field briefly, but found the climate for a purer form of blues in Louisiana to be difficult with sales rarely exceeding 100 copies, and exited that market by 1963.

Lanor entered the southern soul field in the late 1960s, to disappointing results. Lavergne opened a retail music store in 1972, and in 1975 moved Lanor into a location that was previously a restaurant and bar., but the label was in hiatus for most of the 1970s. Lanor came back in 1980 when it released an album of new Charles Mann material named She's Walking Towards Me. In 1982, as Lavergne experienced increasing studio costs, he built his own small studio consisting of an inexpensive mixing board and a single reel-to-reel recording unit.

The label focused primarily on 45rpm singles until the 1990s, at which time it began to issue albums in cassette and compact disc formats.

Later the label was owned and operated by Bobby and Pat Murray, and relocated to Jennings, Louisiana.

The label has been highly sought after by fans of Cajun and zydeco, who often travel to Louisiana seeking releases. The label has also issued material in the bluegrass and blues genres.

== Notable artists ==
- Elton Anderson
- Dale Houston
- Beau Jocque
- Charles Mann
- Phil Phillips
