= List of number-one singles of 1984 (Canada) =

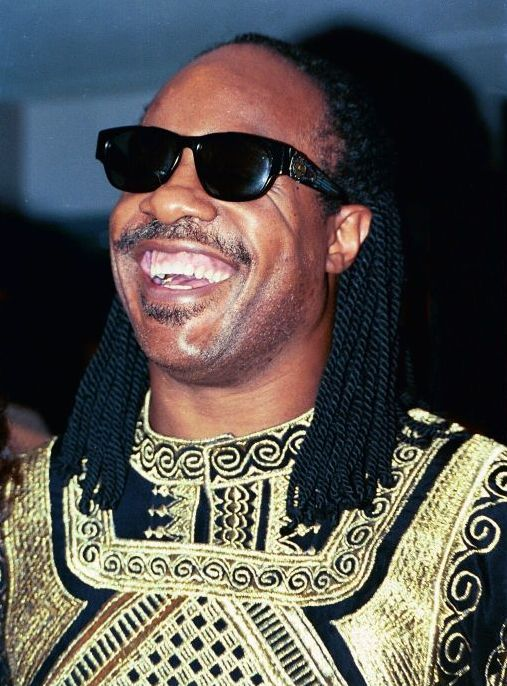
American singer Stevie Wonder achieved the most successful record of 1984 with "I Just Called to Say I Love You".

RPM was a Canadian magazine that published the best-performing singles of Canada from 1964 to 2000. Twenty-six songs reached number one in 1984. Paul McCartney and Michael Jackson had the first number-one hit of the year with "Say Say Say", and the Honeydrippers finished the year at number one with "Sea of Love". Every artist that reached number one except Paul McCartney, Michael Jackson, Culture Club, Lionel Richie, Laura Branigan, and Stevie Wonder did so for the first time in 1984. Cyndi Lauper was the sole act that topped the chart with more than one single this year, with "Girls Just Want to Have Fun" and "Time After Time", staying a total of five weeks at number one. No Canadians topped their native country's chart in 1984.

Although Phil Collins and Wham! spent four issues at number one with "Against All Odds (Take a Look at Me Now)" and "Wake Me Up Before You Go-Go", respectively, it was Stevie Wonder's song "I Just Called to Say I Love You" that topped the RPM year-chart for 1984; it remained three weeks at the number-one position in October and November. The other singles that stayed at number one for at least three weeks were "Karma Chameleon" by Culture Club, "Time After Time" by Cyndi Lauper, "When Doves Cry" by Prince, and "What's Love Got to Do with It" by Tina Turner.

Key
† Indicates best-performing single of 1984

== Chart history ==
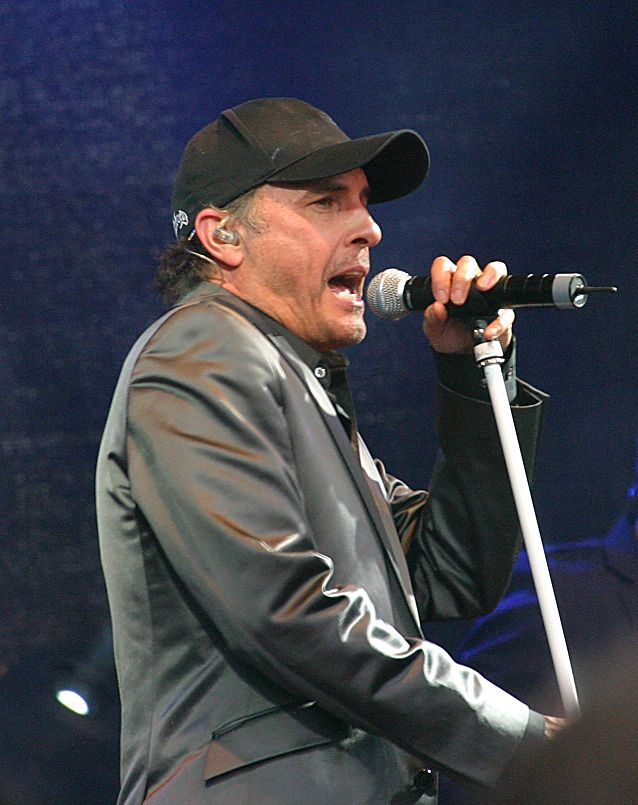
German musician Peter Schilling spent a sole week at number one in January with "Major Tom (Coming Home)".

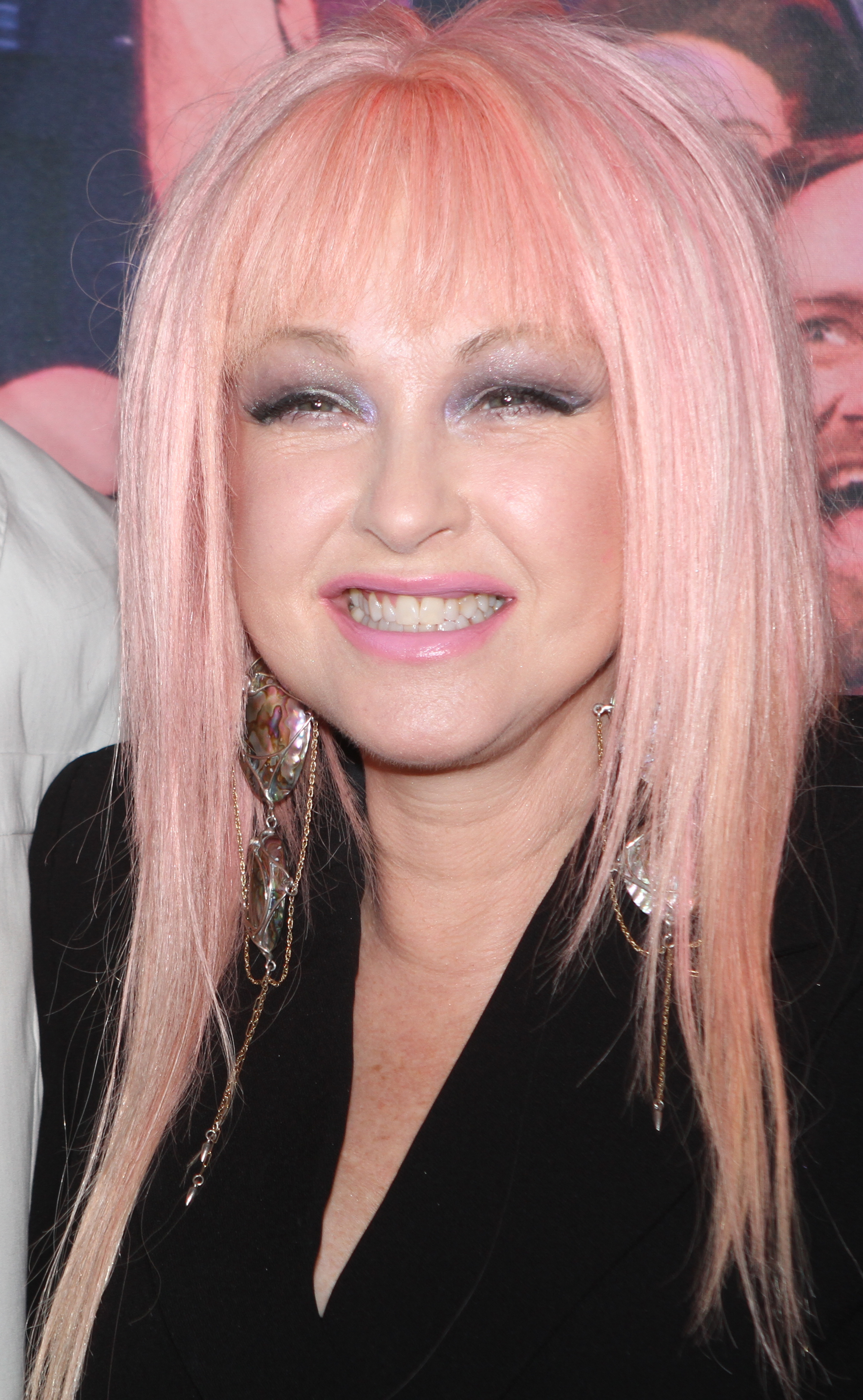
In 1984, Cyndi Lauper was the only musician to reach number one with multiple singles: "Girls Just Want to Have Fun" and "Time After Time".

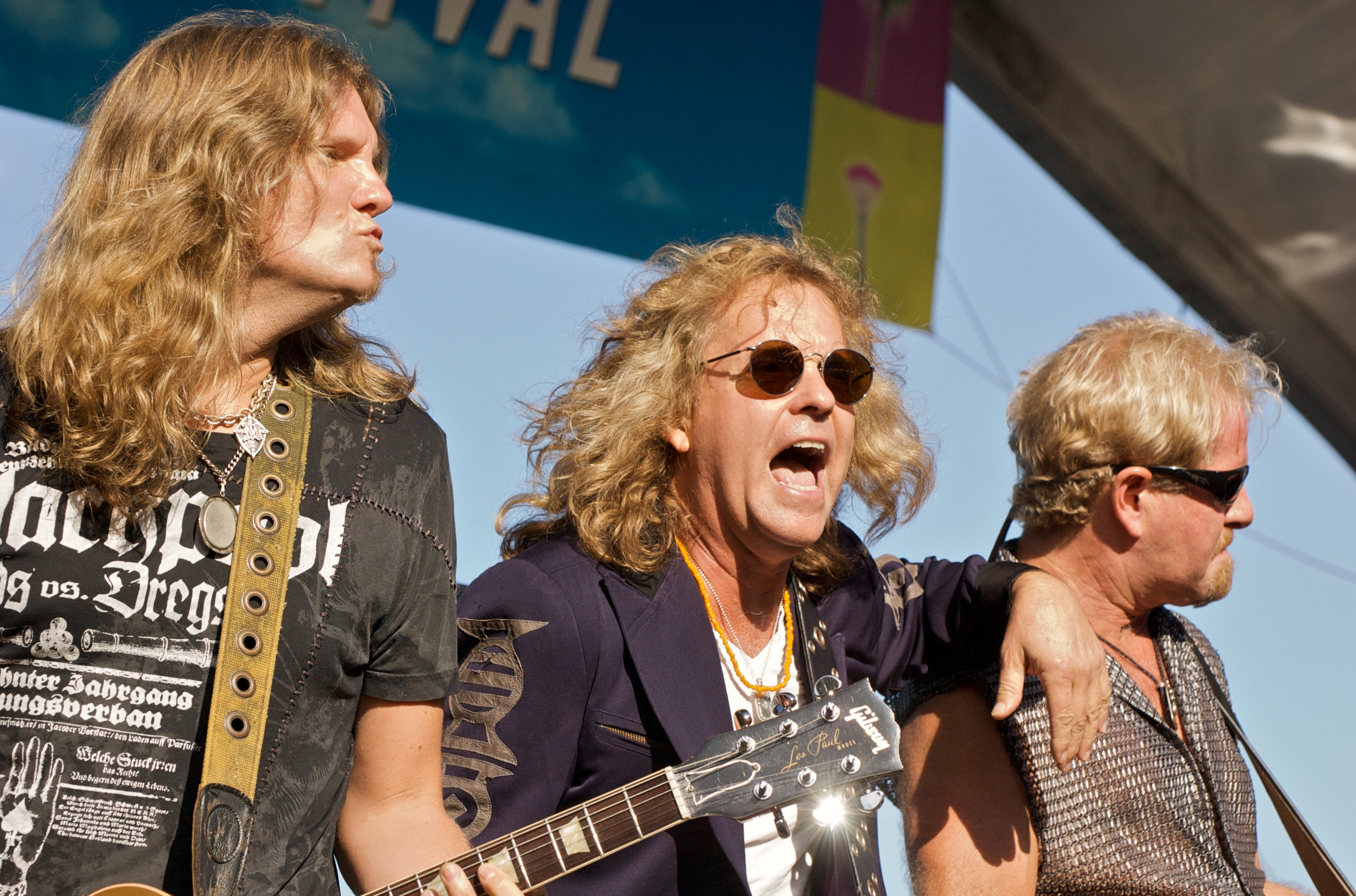
"Sister Christian" by Night Ranger peaked at number one for a week in July.

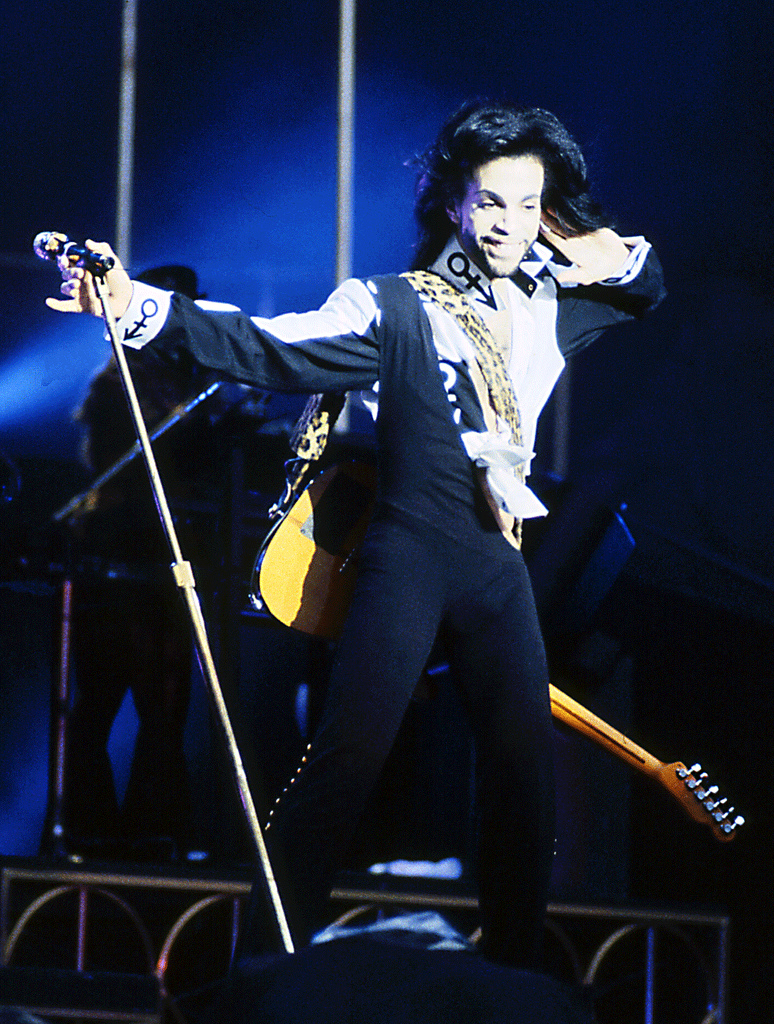
Prince secured his first Canadian number-one hit in 1984 with "When Doves Cry", a three-week chart-topper.

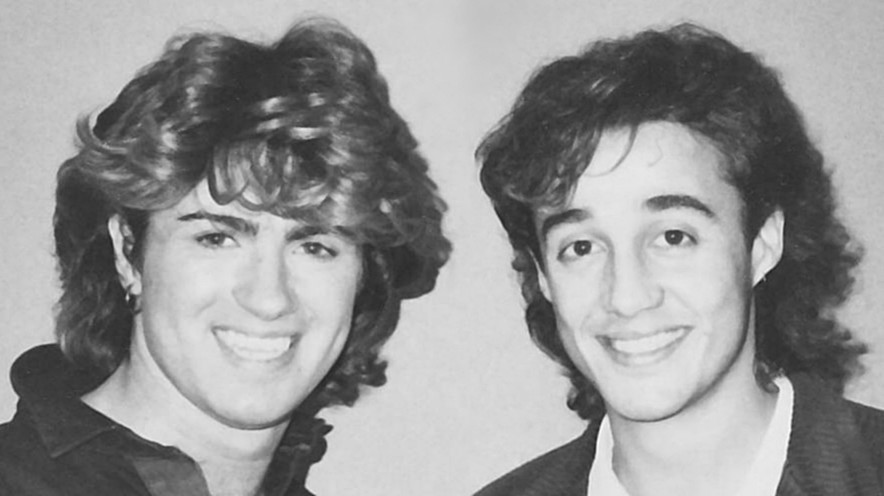
English pop duo Wham! spent four weeks at number one with "Wake Me Up Before You Go-Go" in late 1984.

Issue date	Song	Artist	Reference
7 January (Note: Due to a week's break in publication over the 1983/1984 New Year period, the week of 7 January is inferred.)	"Say Say Say"	Paul McCartney and Michael Jackson	
14 January	"Major Tom (Coming Home)"	Peter Schilling	
21 January	"Karma Chameleon"	Culture Club	
28 January	"Karma Chameleon"	Culture Club	
4 February	"Karma Chameleon"	Culture Club	
11 February	"Talking in Your Sleep"	The Romantics	
18 February	"Red Red Wine"	UB40	
25 February	"Red Red Wine"	UB40	
3 March	"99 Red Balloons"	Nena	
10 March	"99 Red Balloons"	Nena	
17 March	"Jump"	Van Halen	
24 March	"Jump"	Van Halen	
31 March	"Girls Just Want to Have Fun"	Cyndi Lauper	
7 April	"Girls Just Want to Have Fun"	Cyndi Lauper	
14 April	"Footloose"	Kenny Loggins	
21 April	"Against All Odds (Take a Look at Me Now)"	Phil Collins	
28 April	"Against All Odds (Take a Look at Me Now)"	Phil Collins	
5 May	"Against All Odds (Take a Look at Me Now)"	Phil Collins	
12 May	"Against All Odds (Take a Look at Me Now)"	Phil Collins	
19 May	"To All the Girls I've Loved Before"	Julio Iglesias and Willie Nelson	
26 May	"To All the Girls I've Loved Before"	Julio Iglesias and Willie Nelson	
2 June	"Hello"	Lionel Richie	
9 June	"Time After Time"	Cyndi Lauper	
16 June	"Time After Time"	Cyndi Lauper	
23 June	"Time After Time"	Cyndi Lauper	
30 June	"Let's Hear It for the Boy"	Deniece Williams	
7 July	"Oh Sherrie"	Steve Perry	
15 July	"Oh Sherrie"	Steve Perry	
21 July	"Self Control"	Laura Branigan	
28 July	"Sister Christian"	Night Ranger	
4 August	"When Doves Cry"	Prince	
11 August	"When Doves Cry"	Prince	
18 August	"When Doves Cry"	Prince	
25 August	"Ghostbusters"	Ray Parker Jr.	
1 September	"Ghostbusters"	Ray Parker Jr.	
8 September	"What's Love Got to Do with It"	Tina Turner	
15 September	"What's Love Got to Do with It"	Tina Turner	
22 September	"What's Love Got to Do with It"	Tina Turner	
29 September	"Missing You"	John Waite	
6 October	"Missing You"	John Waite	
13 October	"The Warrior"	Scandal	
20 October	"I Just Called to Say I Love You"†	Stevie Wonder	
27 October	"I Just Called to Say I Love You"†	Stevie Wonder	
3 November	"I Just Called to Say I Love You"†	Stevie Wonder	
10 November	"Wake Me Up Before You Go-Go"	Wham!	
17 November	"Wake Me Up Before You Go-Go"	Wham!	
24 November	"Wake Me Up Before You Go-Go"	Wham!	
1 December	"Wake Me Up Before You Go-Go"	Wham!	
8 December	"Caribbean Queen (No More Love on the Run)"	Billy Ocean	
15 December	"Caribbean Queen (No More Love on the Run)"	Billy Ocean	
22 December	"Sea of Love"	The Honeydrippers	
29 December (Note: Due to a week's break in publication over the 1984 Christmas period, the week of 29 December is inferred.)	"Sea of Love"	The Honeydrippers	

== See also ==
- 1984 in music
- List of RPM number-one adult contemporary singles of 1984
- List of RPM number-one country singles of 1984
- List of Billboard Hot 100 number ones of 1984
- List of Cashbox Top 100 number-one singles of 1984
- List of Canadian number-one albums of 1984
