= George Khoury (music producer) =

American record producer (1909-1998)

- Born: July 17, 1909
- Died: January 8, 1998 Lake Charles, Louisiana
- Genres: Cajun, country, swamp blues, swamp pop
- Occupations: Record producer, songwriter, musician
- Years active: 1950s-1960s

George Khoury (July 17, 1909 – January 8, 1998, Lake Charles, Louisiana) was an American pioneer swamp pop and cajun record producer known for co-writing and composing the No. 1 hit song "Sea of Love" by Phil Phillips as well as "Mathilda" by Cookie and his Cupcakes.

His swamp pop, cajun and swamp blues recordings made a big impact on American popular culture. He recorded Nathan Abshire and the song "Pine Grove Blues". Later he would record Lawrence Walker and His Wandering Aces, Elise Deshotel with Dewey Balfa, Harry Choates, Jimmy Newman, and Phil Phillips with the Twilights.

== Biography ==
Khoury's birthplace is unknown; however, he was of Lebanese ancestry. In 1947, as an owner of a record shop, he noticed a lack of Cajun music being recorded in south Louisiana and decided to open a business to compete with Ed Shuler's Goldband Records and J. D. "Jay" Miller's Fais-Do-Do and Feature labels. His base of operations was just around the corner from Shuler's, on Railroad Avenue in Lake Charles.

A longhorn salesman named Virgil Bozman had travelled to Lake Charles and noticed the music being recorded in the region. In the 1940s, Virgel Bozman created a string band that became the studio band for Bill Quinn's Opera label and Gold Star Records label out of Houston, Texas. The band would be called the "Oklahoma Tornados" and sometimes feature fiddler Floyd Leblanc.

Khoury, who saw the need for more Cajun music and financed Virgil's new label, Oklahoma Tornado Records, named after his band. Based in Westlake, Louisiana, this label would record famous Cajun artists including Nathan Abshire & His Pine Grove Boys, creating arguably some of the rawest prewar cajun blues ever recorded Floyd Leblanc, and Harry Choates. Later, the label moved to San Antonio, Texas, and was run by James Bryant and Bennie Hess.

In 1949, after his success with the Oklahoma Tornado Label investment, Khoury created the Lyric label and Khoury's label. He recorded more Cajun songs such as Lawrence Walker's "Evangeline Waltz" and "Reno Waltz" however, he ventured into swamp pop and other genres as well. George Khoury opened up his own record shop, Khoury's Record Shop in downtown Lake Charles, Louisiana, which was co-owned with his brother, Isaac Khoury.

In 1958, Huey Thierry and his Cookie and his Cupcakes band recorded "Mathilda", the unofficial anthem of swamp pop music, which Khoury co-composed. That song would be later recorded by Jerry Lee Lewis, Freddy Fender and The Fabulous Thunderbirds. In 1959, Khoury co-wrote the hit song for Phil Phillips called "Sea of Love". The recording was later released by Khoury's Records Shop. Due to the demand, Khoury leased the recording to Mercury Records on which label it entered the charts at No. 2 in June 1959.

Khoury produced his last record in 1965. He died in 1998.

== Compilation discography ==
Khoury
- Khoury's and O.T. labels
- Founded: 1947
- Genre: Cajun, country, swamp blues, swamp pop
- Country of origin: United States
- Location: Lake Charles, Louisiana, United States

- Cajun Honky Tonk – Various Artists (427 Arhoolie, 1995)
- Cajun Honky Tonk: The Khoury Recordings Vol. 2 (541 Arhoolie, 2012)
Sign inside Khoury's shop

Virgil (Virgel) Bozman
