= Charles Mann (singer) =

American singer

Charles Mann (born Charles Louis Domingue; 1944) is an American singer from Louisiana, performer of the musical genre swamp pop. He is a member of the Louisiana Music Hall of Fame. He should not be confused with the soul singer-songwriter Charles Mann (1949–1991). (Note: Several websites dedicated to music confuse these two people or their date of birth.)

== Life and career ==
Charles Louis Domingue was born on November 22, 1944, in Welsh, Louisiana. He recorded his first single "Keep Your Arms Around Me", a regional hit, in 1965 under the name of Charles Mann, and he then kept this artist's name. His biggest US hit came in 1969 with the Neil Diamond song "Red Red Wine". He also achieved success in the UK with his Cajun-oriented swamp pop version of the Dire Straits' hit "Walk of Life".

Mann signed a record deal with UK-based independent record company Cooking Vinyl, who released the single in 1989 and the full-length album in 1990. Due to demand in England, Mann and his band began touring throughout the U.K., including an appearance Glastonbury Festival.

In recognition of his contributions to Louisiana swamp pop music, Charles became a member of the Louisiana Music Hall of Fame in 1990. He keeps on recording and performing in this musical style.

== Discography ==
=== Singles ===
- 1966 : "I'm Just Wondering" / "Keep Your Arms Around Me" (Lanor Records 524)
- 1966 : "A Good Thing" / "Since You Walked Out On Me" (Lanor 526)
- 1967 : "Hey, Little Girl" / "You're No Longer Mine" (Lanor 529)
- 1967 : "I'm Too Far Gone" / "Misery" (Lanor 535)
- 1969 : "Red, Red Wine" / "She Put The Hurt On Me" (Lanor 543)
- 1970 : "Only Sometime" / "Who's Worried About Tomorrow" (Lanor 550)
- 1971 : "My Kind Of Girl" (Lanor 556)
- 1972 : "People Say" (Lanor 562)
- 1973 : "Any Man Can Be A Fool" / "Right Won't Touch A Hand" (Lanor 565)
- 1975 : "She's Walking Towards Me" / "My Little Home Town" (Lanor 575)
- 1978 : "Right Won't Touch A Hand" / "Tomorrow Never Comes" (Lanor 591)
- 1981 : "All That's Left For Me Is Right" / "From A Jack To A King" (Lanor 605)
- 1984 : "Homemade Love Song" (Lanor)
- 1989 : "Walk of Life" (Cooking Vinyl Stew 1, UK)

=== Albums ===
- 1980 : She's Walking Towards Me (Lanor 1004)
- 1990 : Walk of Life (CookinkVinyl Gumbo 002, UK)
- 1998 : Charles Mann – Essential Collection (Jin Records JIN 9060)
- 2007 : Pushing Your Luck (Jin Records JIN 9084)
- 2013 : Swamp Pop King, Vol. 1 (Mardi Gras Records)
- 2013 : Swamp Pop King, Vol. 2 (Mardi Gras Records)
