= Jimmy Wilson (blues musician) =

American blues singer (1921-1965)

- Born: Jimmie Ned Wilson; January 21, 1918 or 1921/23; Louisiana, U.S.
- Died: February 24, 1966 (aged 43–47) Dallas, Texas, U.S.
- Genres: Blues
- Instrument: Vocals
- Years active: 1951–mid-1960s

Jimmy Wilson (possibly January 21, 1918, 1921 or 1923 – February 5, 1965 or February 24, 1966) was an American West Coast blues singer, best known for his 1953 hit "Tin Pan Alley".

== Career ==
Details of Wilson's life are sketchy and uncertain. He may have been born Jimmie Ned Wilson in Gibsland, Louisiana in 1918, or (according to other sources) near Lake Charles, Louisiana a few years later.

Wilson was singing with a gospel quartet, the Pilgrim Travelers in California, when Bob Geddins began to record him in Oakland in 1951, initially with his band Bob Geddins' Cavaliers. Further recordings were made under Wilson's own name, often accompanied by guitarist Lafayette Thomas. Some of the masters were purchased by Aladdin Records which was based in Los Angeles, and Wilson recorded for Aladdin in 1952 before returning to record for Geddins' Big Town Records in 1953. The first side released, "Tin Pan Alley", reached number 10 on the US Billboard R&B chart and helped to establish Geddins as a major figure in West Coast blues.

Wilson continued to record for Big Town and a few other labels, but failed to capitalize on the success of "Tin Pan Alley". He returned to Louisiana where he recorded for Goldband Records; his 1958 song "Please Accept My Love" was later recorded by B. B. King and Elton Anderson. His last recordings were for Duke Records in Houston in 1961.

Wilson became an alcoholic and died in Dallas either on February 5, 1965 or on February 24, 1966.

== Discography ==
- "Honey Bee" / "Please Believe Me" (recorded 1948) (Aladdin 3087, 4/51)
- "It's A Sin To Tell A Lie" / "Mistake In Life" (rec. 1948) (Cava-Tone 252, 1949; Aladdin 3140, 9/52)
- "Every Dog Has His Day" / "Lemon Squeezer" (rec. 7/52) (Aladdin 3169, 2/53)
- "It's Time To Change" / "Any Man's A Fool" (rec. 7/52) (Aladdin 3241, 1953)
- "Tin Pan Alley" / "Big Town Jump" [instrumental] (Big Town 101, 4/53)
- "Call Me A Hound Dog" / "Instrumental Jump" [instrumental] (Big Town 103, 1953)
- "A Woman Is To Blame" / "Blues At Sundown" (Big Town 107, 10/53)
- "Ethel Lee" / "Tell Me" ('7-11' 2104, 1953)
- "Baby Don't Want Nobody But Me" / "Crying Like A Baby Child" ('7-11' 2105) scheduled for 1953, but never issued
- "Strangest Blues" / "I Used To Love A Woman" (Rhythm 1765, 1954; Elko 915, 1954)
- "Trouble Trouble" / "Frisco Bay" (Rhythm 1766, 1954)
- "Teardrops On My Pillow" / "Mountain Climber" (Big Town 113, 4/54)
- "Louise" / "Alley Blues" (Chart 610, 1956)
- "Send Me Your Key" / "Poor Poor Lover" (Chart 629, 1956)
- "Jumping From Six To Six" / "Trouble In My House" (Big Town 115, 1956)
- "I've Found Out" / "Oh! Red" (rec. 11/55) (Big Town 123, 1956)
- "Oh! Red" / "Blues In The Alley" [= Alley Blues] (Irma 108, 1957) reissues
- "Big Wheel Rolling" / "Please Accept My Love" (Goldband 1074, 8/58; Imperial 5549, 10/58)
- "Don't You Know" / "Could I Be Wrong" (rec. 1958) (Goldband 1091, 7/59)
- "Yanky Danky Doodle" / "That Is Why I'm Happy" (rec. 1958) (Goldband 1095, 1960)
- "Easy Easy Baby" / "My Heart Cries Out For You" (Duke 331, 1/61)
- "I Don't Care" / "Patiently" (Duke 339, 1961)
- "Tin Pan Alley" [re-make] / "Nobody But You" (rec. 8/59) (Goldband 1142, 1963)
