= The Honeydripper (disambiguation) =

"The Honeydripper" is a 1945 R&B song written by Joe Liggins.

The Honeydripper may also refer to:

- The Honeydripper (Roosevelt Sykes album), 1960
- The Honeydripper (Jack McDuff album), 1961
- Roosevelt Sykes (1906–1983), American blues musician

== See also ==
- Honeydripper (film)
- The Honey Drippers (disambiguation)
