= Charles Connor =

American drummer (1935–2021)

- Born: January 14, 1935; New Orleans, Louisiana, U.S.
- Died: July 31, 2021 (aged 86); Glendale, California, U.S.
- Genres: Rhythm and blues, rock and roll
- Occupation: Drummer
- Years active: 1950–2021
- Formerly of: Little Richard, James Brown, Sam Cooke, Jackie Wilson
- Website: Official website

Charles Connor (January 14, 1935 – July 31, 2021) was an American drummer, best known as a member of Little Richard's band. Richard's shout of "a-wop bop-a loo-mop, a-lop bam-boom" at the beginning of "Tutti Frutti" is said to be a reference to Connor's drum rhythms. James Brown described Little Richard and his band, with Connor as the drummer, as "the first to put funk into the rhythm."

== Early life ==
Connor was born in New Orleans, Louisiana, United States. His father was a merchant mariner from Santo Domingo in the Dominican Republic and his mother was a native Louisianan. As a young boy, Connor was inspired by his father singing calypso songs and by the marching bands playing Dixieland jazz near his home in New Orleans' French Quarter, as well as by Bob Alden, Art Blakey, Charles Otis, Gene Krupa, Buddy Rich, and Max Roach. He received his first drum kit at the age of five.

== Career ==
Connor's first professional work as a drummer came in 1950, at the age of 15, when he was hired by Professor Longhair to play drums with him at Mardi Gras. Over the next three years, Connor played drums with Smiley Lewis, Guitar Slim, Jack Dupree, and Shirley and Lee. At the age of 18, in 1953, Connor became the drummer of Little Richard's new, hard-driving rhythm & blues road band, The Upsetters. The Upsetters began to tour successfully, even without a bass player on songs, forcing drummer Connor to thump "real hard" on his bass drum in order to get a "bass fiddle effect." Connor continued to drum for Richard as his fame increased throughout the 1950s, drumming on records such as "Lucille", "She's Got It", "Keep A-Knockin'", and "Ooh! My Soul". He played on the January and October, 1957 versions. On 1957's "Keep A-Knockin'", Connor played a four-bar drum intro (known as the "flattened out double shuffle") that John Bonham later imitated in the opening of Led Zeppelin's "Rock and Roll". At times when Connor was not working with Richard, he drummed with James Brown, after Richard connected The Famous Flames with his promoter Clint Brantley. Brown described Connor, while playing in Richard's mid-1950s band, as "the first [drummer] to put funk into the rhythm".

In his later career, Connor drummed with Sam Cooke, Jackie Wilson, The Coasters, Big Joe Turner, Larry Williams, Don Covay, George Lightfoot, and Dee Clark. During the 1980s, Connor put together a new group, Charles Connor's Upsetters. Their first single was a cover of Richard's "I Got It", then they issued some originals, including "Kiss My Love" and "Drummer Man" (featuring Connor's first lead vocal on record. Connor and Richard reunited in 1990 after a hiatus of three decades, performing "The Girl Can't Help It" in on stage in Malmö, Sweden.

Connor issued two books, Keep a Knockin' (2015) and Don't Give Up on Your Dreams (2008), the latter an inspirational tome. He was inducted to the Louisiana Music Hall of Fame in 2010. He released his album Still Knocking in 2013. Connor was working on an autobiographical documentary up until his death.

== Personal life ==
Connor was married to Zenaida for over three decades until his death. They reconnected in 1981, having first met while he toured the Philippines with Little Richard's band. Together, they had a daughter named Queenie.

Connor died on July 31, 2021, at his home in Glendale, California, under hospice care. He was 86, and suffered from normal pressure hydrocephalus prior to his death.
