= Wayne Pedzwater =

American bass guitarist (1956–2005)

- Born: Wayne Pedziwiatr; September 2, 1956
- Origin: New York, United States
- Died: March 17, 2005 (aged 48)
- Genres: Pop; jazz; rock; fusion
- Occupation: Musician
- Instrument: Bass
- Years active: 1979–2005

Wayne Pedzwater (September 2, 1956 – March 17, 2005), born Wayne Pedziwiatr, was an American bassist known for his work as a session and touring musician and performer. Over the course of his career, he recorded and performed with artists such as Buddy Rich, John Lennon, Yoko Ono, Michael Jackson, Jeff Beck, Robert Plant, The Rolling Stones, Paul Simon, Bette Midler, Carole King, Jewel, and Blood, Sweat, & Tears.

== Early Life and Education ==
Pedzwater was originally born Wayne Pedziwiatr on September 2, 1956, in New Kensington, Pennsylvania. He later then graduated from Valley High School in 1974 and attended Berklee College of Music.

While attending Berklee, Pedzwater was heard and noticed by bandleader Buddy Rich who then recruited him to play bass with the Buddy Rich Orchestra. Pedzwater went on to become a soloist with the orchestra and performed with them internationally and was broadcast on national television.

== Career ==
=== Early career ===
Following the start of his professional career with the Buddy Rich Orchestra, Pedzwater moved to New York City in 1980. There, he established a career as a session bassist, recording and touring with many artists ranging across the musical genres.

=== Major Collaborations ===
Among those artists with which Pedzwater recorded were John Lennon and Yoko Ono, including their album Milk and Honey, Jeff Beck and Robert Plant as a member of The Honeydrippers, Terence Trent D’Arby, The Rolling Stones, and Michael Jackson.

Pedzwater was a member of Blood, Sweat, and Tears, and additionally toured with Paul Simon and Bette Midler. His other documented professional associations include Garth Brooks, Plácido Domingo, Jimmy Webb, David Sanborn, Paul Shaffer, Carole King, and Jewel.

Overall Pedzwater collaborated with numerous notable artists, such as Buddy Rich, John Lennon, Michael Jackson, Jewel, The Honeydrippers, Simon and Garfunkel, Carly Simon, Bette Midler, Carole King, Billy Cobham, Mike Francis, The Rolling Stones, Robert Plant, Paul Simon, Terence Trent D’Arby, and Yoko Ono. In addition he also performed on numerous film and television soundtracks and commercials.

Outside of music Pedzwater was known to be an avid cyclist in his personal life.

== Certain Recording Credits ==
- Pedzwater was credited as the bassist for Blood, Sweat, and Tears
- Pedzwater was credited to have played bass and performed with Simon & Garfunkel
- Pedzwater was credited to have played bass on The Honeydrippers’ 1984 album The Honeydrippers: Volume One
- Pedzwater was credited to have performed with the Thom Rotella band in 1987
- Pedzwater was credited as the bassist on Carole King’s 1989 album City Streets

== Death ==
Wayne Pedzwater died on March 17, 2005, at 48 years old, after reportedly a long fought battle with stomach cancer, he passed away in his home in New York. He is survived by his wife, Patty Forbes Petzwater, along with his mother and sister.

== Selected discography ==
- The Dream 1973-2011 with Michael Franks (2012)
- King of Pop with Michael Jackson (2008)
- Blood on the Dance Floor/Invincible with Michael Jackson (2006)
- Mile 23 with Dana Edelman (2005)
- Greatest Dance Hits Sugar Beats (2004)
- A Woman's Love with Vaneese Thomas (2003)
- Different Road with Rhonda Stisi (2003)
- Making Good Noise with Tom Chapin (2003)
- Final Fantasy: The Spirits Within [Original Motion Picture Soundtrack] with Elliot Goldenthal (2001)
- Great Big Fun for the Very Little One with Tom Chapin
- Car Tunes Sugar Beats (2000)
- Live In Rome with Billy Cobham (2000)
- Grail: The Rock Musical of the Future with Bob Christianson (2000)
- This Pretty Planet with Tom Chapin (2000)
- Joy: A Holiday Collection with Jewel (1999)
- And Then Some with Dan Wilensky (1998)
- I'm an Animal: Songs of Earth as Animals See It with Sarah Weeks (1998)
- In My Hometown with Tom Chapin (1998)
- Blood on the Dance Floor: HIStory in the Mix with Michael Jackson (1997)
- Helium with John Forster (1997)
- Imago with Lorenza Ponce (1997)
- Medicine 4 My Pain with Lynden David Hall (1996)
- Around the World & Back Again with Tom Chapin (1996)
- HIStory - Past, Present And Future - Book I with Michael Jackson (1995)
- By Design with Billy Cobham (1992)
- City Streets with Carole King (1989)
- Share My Dream with Gerry Niewood (1985)
- Lifetime Guarantee with Michael Jackson (1983)
