= Bas Clas =

American rock band

- Origin: Lafayette, Louisiana, United States
- Genre: Rock
- Years active: 1976–1991; 2002-present
- Labels: Toe Up Records, Serfdom Records
- Members: Donnie Picou; Steve Picou; Ted Cobena; Geoff Thistlethwaite
- Past members: Pat Gremillion; Buddy Bowers

Bas Clas (pronounced ‘bahs clahs’) is a rock band formed in Lafayette, Louisiana in the late 1970s by brothers Donnie and Steve Picou. The name is derived from a Cajun term meaning "low class." It derives from French expression "classe de base" or base class in English. The name is a tongue-in-cheek poke at prejudice, a reflection of the band's attitude.

== History ==
From 1976 to 1991, Bas Clas worked the music scene of the Deep South and released three 45 rpm singles on their own record labels. The first "Chasing a Mad Dog/All in Your Mind" was released on Toe Up Records, a moniker the band created for the release. One thousand copies were pressed at Floyd's Records in Ville Platte, Louisiana (see Floyd Soileau). In 1980 Bas Clas recorded at Studio in the Country with engineer David Farrell, and in 1981 released another single, "Serfin' USA/Physical World" on their new label, Serfdom Records, this time pressing 3000 copies. The label bought advertisements in New York Rocker and Trouser Press magazines, and was listed as "Recommended" in Billboard Magazine, attracting inquiries that resulted in college radio airplay in more than two dozen states.

In 1982, author and producer Samuel Charters heard Bas Clas live at Grant Street Dancehall and sent a cassette tape demo of the band's music to his friend, producer John Hammond Sr. "You may not know who the hell I am, but I was a vice-president of CBS Records for many years and had a lot to do with everybody from Billie Holiday to Bob Dylan and Bruce Springsteen; and frankly it does take quite a lot to impress me. Just let me say I'm impressed," wrote the late John Hammond in 1983. Hammond and his longtime assistant, Mikie Harris, met with the Picou brothers, and for the next couple of years shopped the band around to labels, but there were no takers. In 1985, the band released another single, "She Can't Say No/La Ti Da" on Serfdom Records, but only pressed 500 copies and the single was not well-distributed.

Relocated to Atlanta in 1986, the band attracted the interest of producer Tom Werman who, like Hammond, was unsuccessful in shopping the band to labels. While in Atlanta the band secured a management deal with music promoter John Scher, but again, no record label interest, and they parted ways by 1990. Eventually, the grind of the road and the lack of support from the recording industry caused the band to end its full-time status, which the band did at the 1991 N.O. Jazz & Heritage Festival with special guest musicians Anthony Thistlethwaite and Jonno Frishberg.

== Reunion ==
In 2002, Bas Clas reunited with members Donnie and Steve Picou, Ted Cobena, and Geoff Thistlethwaite, with special guests Dickie Landry, Eric Adcock, and Mike Picou, performed and recorded (two songs on the compilation CD "Medicine Show Vol. 3: Gatherings of the Tribe") at Grant Street Dancehall for the annual "Medicine Show" benefit for the Dr. Tommy Comeaux Endowed Chair in Traditional Music at the University of Louisiana at Lafayette, and began a new journey.

In August 2011, joined by guest musicians including Dickie Landry, Eric Adcock, Roddie Romero, David Greely, Christine Balfa, Mitch Reed, Mike Picou, and Leslie Blackshear Smith, the band spent a week at Dockside Studio with engineer David Farrell. A seven-song CD, Big Oak Tree, was released on Serfdom Records in April 2012 and features the first new Bas Clas recordings in more than 20 years; the CD was an OffBeat Magazine "Best of the Beat" nominee for Best Rock Album of 2012. The band performed at Festival International in Lafayette, Louisiana in 2012, and in 2013 at the Art-B-Cue in Avondale Estates, GA and at the Midcity Bayou Boogaloo in New Orleans, along with several other shows at music clubs in Louisiana. In January 2013 Bas Clas was inducted into the Acadiana Chapter of the Louisiana Music Hall of Fame. A new CD is scheduled for release in the fall of 2013.

== Personnel ==
=== Current members ===
- Donnie Picou – Songwriter/Singer/Guitarist/Founder
- Steve Picou – Lead Guitar/Backing vocals/Founder
- Ted Cobena – Drums
- Geoff Thistlethwaite – Bass

=== Past members ===
- Pat Gremillion – Guitarist/Singer
- Buddy Bowers – Drums/Vocals
- Eric B – Guitarist

== Selected discography ==
- Chasing a Mad Dog/All in Your Mind (1977, Toe Up Records, 45 rpm single)
- Serfin' USA/Physical World (1981, Serfdom Records, 45 rpm single)
- She Can't Say No/La Ti Da (1985, Serfdom Records, 45 rpm single)
- Volume One: The Early Years 1977-86 (2008, Serfdom Records, CD)
- Big Oak Tree (2012, Serfdom Records, CD)
