= Cookie and his Cupcakes =

American swamp-pop band

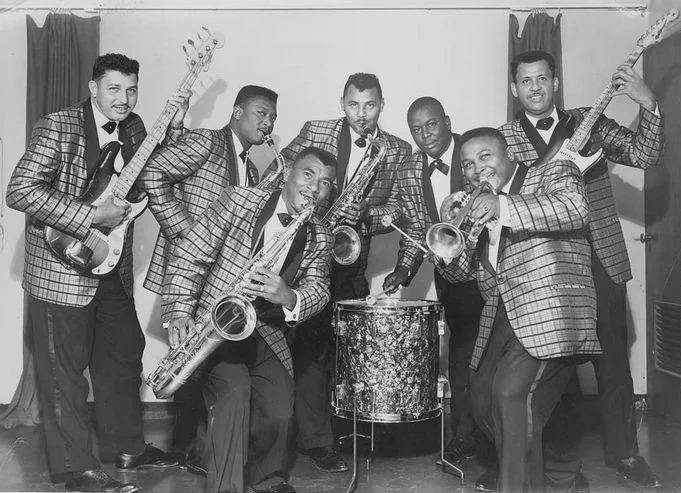

Background information
- Also known as: Boogie Ramblers
- Origin: Louisiana, United States
- Genres: Swamp pop
- Years active: 1950s-1970s
- Past members: Shelton Dunaway; Huey Thierry; Sidney Reynaud; Marshall Laday; Ernest Jacobs; Joe Landry; Ivory Jackson

Cookie and his Cupcakes was an American swamp pop band from south Louisiana, best known for their 1959 hit "Mathilda", the unofficial anthem of swamp pop music.

== History ==
The band originally started as the Boogie Ramblers, led by Shelton Dunaway (August 3, 1934 – November 19, 2022). Huey "Cookie" Thierry (born in Roanoke, Louisiana, August 13, 1936 – September 23, 1997) joined in 1952, and shared lead vocals and tenor sax with Dunaway. Other original members were Sidney "Hot Rod" Reynaud (tenor sax), Marshall Laday or LeDee (guitar), Ernest Jacobs (piano), Joe "Blue" Landry (bass) and Ivory Jackson (drums). The band was based in Lake Charles, Louisiana.

They started playing in 1953 as the house band at the Moulin Rouge Club in Lake Charles. In 1955, the Boogie Ramblers released "Cindy Lou" and "Such As Love" on Goldband Records. They became a popular regional live act, and toured with Jerry Lee Lewis and Fats Domino. In 1956, Cookie began being the front man and the name of the band was changed to "Cookie and the Boogie Ramblers". Soon after, the band switched to its final name after hearing it shouted in jest from an audience. In 1957, they recorded their signature song "Mathilda" for Judd Records. After initial struggles to get the song recorded they were able to use KAOK's studio. The record rose to number 47 on the Billboard pop chart in early 1959, and is regarded as the unofficial anthem of the swamp pop genre. They followed up with a number of highly regarded but less commercially successful singles in the early 1960s, including "Belinda", "Betty and Dupree", and "Got You on My Mind"; the latter reached the Billboard Hot 100 in May 1963. They also recorded for Khourys Records.

In August 1965, Thierry moved to Los Angeles to work outside the music industry, leaving the Cupcakes to continue without him. Cookie was replaced as lead singer by "Little Alfred" (or "Lil' Alfred") Babino (January 5, 1944, Lake Charles – November 14, 2006). With Ernest Jacobs as bandleader, the group continued for several years but dispersed in the early 1970s.

Thierry was rediscovered in the early 1990s and played at occasional blues festivals, reunited with the rest of the band, until his death in 1997. Thereafter, the band, led by Lil' Alfred, continued to perform at clubs in Louisiana and southeast Texas. Babino died at his residence in Lake Charles in 2006.
