= Sea of Love (Phil Phillips song) =

- "Sea of Love" sheet music

Single by Phil Phillips

from the album Sea of Love
- Published: 1959
- Released: July 1959
- Recorded: 1959
- Genre: Rhythm and blues; swamp pop
- Length: 2:30
- Label: Mercury
- Songwriters: Phil Phillips; George Khoury

"Sea of Love" is a song written by Phil Phillips and George Khoury. It was the only top-40 chart-maker for Phillips, who never recorded another hit.

== Background ==
Phil Phillips (real name John Philip Baptiste) was working as a bellboy in Lake Charles, Louisiana, when he wrote "Sea of Love" for a love interest. He was introduced to local record producer George Khoury, who took Baptiste into his studio to record it. At Khoury's request, Baptiste took the stage name of Phil Phillips. The song, originally credited to Phil Phillips with The Twilights, was released on a small record label owned by Khoury, but due to its success it was eventually licensed to Mercury Records. Despite the success of "Sea of Love", Phillips claimed that he only ever received US$6,800 for recording it.

== Chart performance ==
Phil Phillips' 1959 recording of the song peaked at No. 1 on the U.S. Billboard R&B chart and No. 2 on the Billboard Hot 100. "The Three Bells" by The Browns kept it from the No.1 spot. In 1959, it sold over one million copies and was awarded a gold disc.

=== Weekly charts ===
Phil Phillips

Chart (1959)	Peak position
Canada CHUM Chart	1
US Billboard Hot 100	2
US Billboard R&B	1
US Cash Box Top 100	2

Marty Wilde

Chart (1959)	Peak position
UK	3

Del Shannon

Chart (1981–1982)	Peak position
Canada RPM Adult Contemporary	28
US Billboard Hot 100	33
US Billboard Adult Contemporary	36
US Cash Box Top 100	33

The Honeydrippers

Chart (1984–1985)	Peak position
Australia (Kent Music Report)	5
Canada RPM Adult Contemporary	1
Canada RPM Top Singles	1
Ireland (IRMA)	29
New Zealand (Recorded Music NZ)	6
UK	56
US Billboard Hot 100	3
US Billboard Adult Contemporary	1
US Cash Box Top 100	3

Phil Phillips & the Twilights/Marty Wilde

Chart (1991)	Peak position
UK	100

=== Year-end charts ===
The Honeydrippers

Chart (1985)	Rank
Australia	62
Canada	58
US Billboard Hot 100	34
US Cash Box	65

== Notable cover versions ==
The song has been covered by a number of artists since the first 1959 recording. Among the most notable versions are the following:

- Later in 1959, in the UK, Marty Wilde covered the song which subsequently peaked at No. 3 in the UK Singles Chart. The original Phil Phillips rendition failed to chart there.
- In 1969 Nino Tempo and April Stevens recorded 'Sea Of Love/(Sittin' On) The Dock Of The Bay' which played upon the similarity of the chords (And the subject matter) of the two songs.
- B. J. Thomas recorded the song on his 1975 album Reunion.
- Iggy Pop recorded the song for his 1981 album Party.
- Del Shannon’s cover version went to number 33 on the Billboard Hot 100 in 1982 and number 28 on the Canadian AC charts.
- Robert Plant's Honeydrippers included it on their 1984 album, The Honeydrippers: Volume One. This version went on to reach No. 1 in Canada in December 1984, No. 3 on the Billboard Hot 100 chart in early 1985 and No. 1 on the adult contemporary chart in 1984.
- Katie Webster covered the song on her 1988 album, The Swamp Boogie Queen; she had played on the original.
- Tom Waits's version was first available on the 1989 soundtrack for the movie Sea of Love and later on his 2006 album Orphans
- Cat Power recorded it on her 2000 album, The Covers Record. The 2007 film Juno featured her version in its soundtrack. Power’s cover was certified gold in Canada and gold in United States.
- Stornoway during a live broadcast from Maida Vale Studios for Jo Whiley on BBC Radio 2 debuted an arrangement of the song.

== In popular culture ==
- In the intro of the Guess Who song, "Hi Rockers!", the song is heard playing on the jukebox as Burton Cummings and engineer Brian Christian are heard talking.
- The song shares a title with, and features prominently in the plot-line of, the 1989 Harold Becker film Sea of Love starring Al Pacino and Ellen Barkin.
- "Sea of Love" was used in the 2000 film Frequency starring Dennis Quaid and Jim Caviezel.
- "Sea of Love" was used to close out The Simpsons season 16 episode "Future-Drama".
- "Sea of Love" was used in the Futurama season 7 episode "Naturama" in 2012.

== See also ==
- List of 1950s one-hit wonders in the United States
- List of number-one R&B singles of 1959 (U.S.)
- List of number-one adult contemporary singles of 1984 (U.S.)
- List of RPM number-one singles of 1984
