= Larry McKinley =

- Born: 13 December 1927; Chicago, Illinois, U.S.
- Died: 8 December 2013 (aged 85); New Orleans, Louisiana, U.S.
- Occupation: Radio personality
- Known for: Co-founder Minit Records, Voice of Jazzfest
- Awards: Louisiana Music Hall of Fame (Inducted 2010), Offbeat Magazine Best of the Beat Music Business Award 2005, AFTRA Hall of Fame (Inducted 1989)

Larry McKinley (8 December 1927 – 13 December 2013) was a New Orleans–based American music promoter, record label co-owner, radio personality and festival icon. He was most well known as the "Voice of Jazzfest", co-founder of Minit Records, and the host of several shows on the New Orleans radio stations WNNR-AM and WMRY-FM (now known as WYLD (AM)).

== Early life ==
McKinley was born on December 13, 1927, in Chicago, Illinois. He spent his early years in the Chicago area and went on to study at Roosevelt University. While studying there in September 1954, he received an internship with the radio station WMRY-FM in New Orleans. He decided to settle there permanently after he covered a speech by Martin Luther King, after which he was quoted having said "I can't go back I feel like I'm being a part of history here"..

== Career ==
In 1959 McKinley's success in hosting the radio station WMRY-FM led to a close friendship with a local businessman named Joe Banashak. Together the two each invested $650 to found a record label called Minit Records. The name came to Banashak when he drove by a restaurant called "Meal a Minit". McKinley, who was also promoting local artists, eventually signed Allen Toussaint as the producer for the label. The production efforts of Toussaint earned the label a No. 1 spot on the national pop and R&B charts through Ernie K-Doe's 1961 hit Mother-in-Law. McKinley went on to briefly own one third of the record label Instant Records but dropped out for reasons that are not entirely clear. Minit Records was also home to artist such as Aaron Neville and Irma Thomas.

After leaving the record label business for good McKinley went back to radio, hosting the popular local radio show "The Frank and Larry Show". McKinley also went on to join the governing board of the New Orleans Jazz & Heritage Foundation, Inc, the proprietor of what is colloquially known as Jazzfest, a New Orleans–based annual music festival. He left the governing board in order to record the voice-overs for the festival. His voice, often described as a baritone, became a mainstay of the festival and is still used today. McKinley also presided over the annual festival gala as the master of ceremonies.

== Awards ==
For his work in the music industry McKinley won several award over the years. In 1989 McKinley was inducted into the AFTRA Hall of Fame for his work in the radio industry. In 2005 OffBeat magazine awarded McKinley their "Best of the Beat Music Business Award" for his contributions to the music business industry. Five years later McKinley was inducted into the prestigious Louisiana Music Hall of Fame.

== Death ==
McKinley died on December 8, 2013, from complications due to COPD. He was buried on December 16, 2013. His legacy continues through his four daughters and a host of grandchildren and great-grandchildren .
