= Roe Ethridge =

American commercial and art photographer

- Born: August 7, 1969 (age 56); Miami, Florida
- Education: Atlanta College of Art, Atlanta, Georgia
- Movement: Postmodern art photography
- Website: Andrew Kreps Gallery, Gagosian Gallery

Roe Ethridge is a postmodernist commercial and art photographer, known for exploring the plastic nature of photography – how pictures can be easily replicated and recombined to create new visual experiences. He often adapts images that have already been published, adding new, sculpted simulations of reality, or alternatively creates highly stylized versions of classical compositions, such as a still life bowl of moldy fruit which appeared on the cover of Vice magazine, or landscapes and portraits with surprising elements. After participating in the 2008 Whitney Biennial, his work has been collected by several leading public museums, including the Museum of Modern Art, Institute of Contemporary Art, Boston, Museum of Contemporary Art, Los Angeles, and the Tate Modern. In 2010, his work was included in the MoMA's 25th Anniversary New Photography exhibit.

== Biography ==
Born in Miami, Florida, in 1969, Roe Ethridge grew up in the Atlanta, Georgia area. He attended Florida State University and graduated with a BFA in Photography from the Atlanta College of Art. In 1997 he moved to New York City and started his commercial photography career, over time providing catalog images, editorial and fashion shots, and working for publications including New York Times Magazine, Allure, Spin, Vice and Wired. The same year he moved, he also had his first solo exhibition, in Zurich, Switzerland, and participated in the Atlanta Biennial, held at the Nexus Contemporary Art Center. By the 2011 Deutsche Börse Photography Prize competition, the Jury advanced him to the four finalists.

Ethridge took the cover photo for Cat Power's 1998 album Moon Pix. They had known each other as teenagers in Atlanta.

In 2002, Ethridge married fashion model Nancy Hagen. They live in Rockaway Beach, Queens and his studio is in Brooklyn, NY.

== Work ==
"American photographer Roe Ethridge became a recognizable force in the fine art world with his serene but subversive portraits, still lifes, and landscapes." -James Lim, New York Magazine, 2012

Ethridge is widely regarded to have been influenced by fellow photo artists including Thomas Ruff, Michael Schmidt, and Christopher Williams. Critics have frequently noted his seamless switching between commercial assignments and fine art photography. As a commercial photographer, beyond contributing to many magazine editorials, his clients have ranged from fashion, including Balenciaga and Kenzo, to corporate, such as Goldman Sachs. He often appropriates his own work as commercial photographer — as well as newspaper, catalog and stock photography — for his museum and gallery shows. According to the curators of the MoMA: "The pictures acquire their meaning from the salient way in which they have been shuffled, sequenced, and laid out in nonlinear narrative structures. His prints vary widely in scale and source material. Combining and recombining already recontextualized images, Ethridge at once subverts the photographs' original roles and renews their signifying possibilities."

From 2005 to 2010, Ethridge was commissioned to photograph the construction of 200 West Street, the Goldman Sachs headquarters in Lower Manhattan.

In 2009, Ethridge returned to a studio-based approach after the international location shooting for his project "Rockaway." In his 2012 series "Interiors", he investigates the broad world of personal space, featuring images of his own home and studio, magazine photographs of staged bedrooms inspired by the suburban aesthetic, and billboard advertisements.

Commissioned by automobile manufacturer Mercedes-Benz in 2014, Ethridge directed Special sets the standard, a three-minute short film starring actress Tilda Swinton as the driver of a S-Class Coupé.

== Exhibitions ==
Ethridge's work has been shown in the United States and internationally, including: Greater New York, MOMA PS1 (2000), The Americans, Barbican Center, London (2001), Hello My Name Is…, Carnegie Museum of Art (2002), Momentum 4: Roe Ethridge, Institute of Contemporary Art, Boston (2005), Whitney Biennial (2008), New Photography 2010: Roe Ethridge, Museum of Modern Art, New York (2010), and Les Recontres D'Arles, France (2011). A major survey of his work, curated by Anne Pontégnie, originated at Le Consortium in Dijon, France, and opened at M - Museum Leuven, Belgium.

== Publications ==
- Le Luxe, Mack: London, 2012. ISBN 978-1-907946-08-0

== Collections ==
After gaining considerable exposure from participating in the 2008 Whitney Biennial, his photographs have been acquired by several modern art museums, including:

- Museum of Modern Art
- Institute of Contemporary Art, Boston
- Museum of Contemporary Art, Los Angeles
- Tate Modern
