= No Foolin'! =

Studio album by Katie Webster
- Released: 1991
- Genre: Blues
- Label: Alligator
- Producer: Katie Webster, Bruce Iglauer, Vasti Jackson, Ice Cube Slim

Katie Webster chronology
Paula (1991)	No Foolin'! (1991)	Deluxe Edition (1999)

No Foolin'! is an album by the American musician Katie Webster, released in 1991. It was her third album for Alligator Records, and her final studio album before her stroke. Webster supported the album with a North American tour.

== Production ==
The album was produced by Webster, Bruce Iglauer, Vasti Jackson, and Ice Cube Slim. Morris Jennings played drums on the tracks. Lonnie Brooks duetted with Webster on "Those Lonely, Lonely Nights". "Zydeco Shoes and California Blues", on which C. J. Chenier performed, references Webster's early work backing Louisiana musicians. "It's Mighty Hard" incorporates elements of gospel music; "Mama Cat Cuttin' No Slack" is a boogie-woogie number.

== Critical reception ==
Professional ratings
Review scores
Source	Rating
AllMusic	3/5 stars
Calgary Herald	B+
Chicago Tribune	4/4 stars
MusicHound Blues: The Essential Album Guide	3/5 stars
The Penguin Guide to Blues Recordings	3/4 stars

The Calgary Herald called the album "a strut through downtown Saturday night when the fur is threatening to fly in all the juke joints and mellow is better left to the jazz crowd." Newsday noted that "she sounds tired... Even the opening cut, 'A Little Meat on the Side', which structurally and thematically is right up Webster's alley, seems lackluster." The Chicago Tribune deemed No Foolin'! "one of the finest blues albums you'll ever hear," writing that "Webster takes you on a musical journey celebrating the music she has been playing most of her life."

The Washington Post wrote that the album is "fueled by her pumping barrelhouse piano, saucy lyrics and sassy delivery." The Edmonton Journal determined that it shows "Webster's strength as an independent woman who takes macho blues cliches and inverts them on their head." The Morning Call concluded that Webster "manages to retain her zest and vigor while becoming progressively less coarse." The Central New Jersey Home News Tribune listed No Foolin'! as the fifth best blues album of 1991.

AllMusic wrote that, "although she also contributes some atmospheric chordal organ, it is Katie Webster's piano playing that gives her music its most distinctive personality."

== Track listing ==
No.	Title	Length
1.	"A Little Meat on the Side"
2.	"I'm Bad"
3.	"No Deposit, No Return"
4.	"Zydeco Shoes and California Blues"
5.	"Too Much Sugar for a Dime"
6.	"Hard Lovin' Mama"
7.	"It's Mighty Hard"
8.	"Tangled in Your Web"
9.	"Those Lonely, Lonely Nights"
10.	"Mama Cat Cuttin' No Slack"
