= The Sheppards =

The Sheppards was an American, Chicago-based soul and blues vocal group. The group was formed in 1959 by the members of the Ballads and the Bel Aires and was active until 1969. The group was named after producer Bill Sheppard and consisted of Millard Edwards (lead and bass), Jimmy Allen (baritone), James Dennis Isaac (bass and fifth tenor), O. C. Perkins (second tenor), Murrie Eskridge (lead and top tenor), and Kermit Chandler (guitar). They recorded for Vee-Jay Records, and were featured on compilations such as Tomorrow's Hits (1962).
