= Cross Bones Style =

Song by Cat Power

from the album Moon Pix
- Published: September 22, 1998
- Recorded: January 1998
- Genre: Indie rock
- Length: 4:32
- Label: Matador
- Songwriter(s): Chan Marshall
- Producer(s): Matt Voigt

"Cross Bones Style" is a song by the American rock musician Cat Power, also known as Chan Marshall. It is the 10th song on her fourth album, Moon Pix, released in September 1998 on Matador Records.

== Origin and recording ==
"Cross Bones Style," along with five other songs from Moon Pix, was written by Marshall one night in the fall of 1997, after she awoke from a hallucinatory nightmare while alone in the South Carolina farmhouse she shared with then-boyfriend, American musician Bill Callahan. "My nightmare was surrounding my house like a tornado," she explained. "So I just ran and got my guitar because I was trying to distract myself. I had to turn on the lights and sing to God. I got a tape recorder and recorded the next sixty minutes. And I played these long changes, into six different songs. That's where I got the record."

The song was recorded by Matt Voigt at Sing Sing Studio in Melbourne, Australia in January 1998. As with most songs on Moon Pix, "Cross Bones Style" was largely recorded live, with Marshall singing and playing guitar at the same time. The drums, by Jim White of the Australian instrumental rock band Dirty Three, were added after.

== Composition and lyrics ==
In a 2018 interview with The Guardian, Marshall explained that the song was inspired by two children she met while in Africa, who slept in trees at night after their parents were killed. "A lot of kids slept in the trees in the park," Marshall recalled.

== Music video ==
"Cross Bones Style" was never released as a single, but a music video directed by American director Brett Vapnek was released for the song. It was the only video released to promote Moon Pix, and Cat Power's second music video, following "Nude as the News," also directed by Vapnek.

Marshall has cited the 1983 music video for "Lucky Star," by American musician and actress Madonna, as an influence on the video. In a 1998 interview with Index, she explained, "I'm thinking of making ["Cross Bones Style"] the single and doing a full-on "Lucky Star" style video. Like Madonna, dancing in a white room. I'm sure I'll chicken out though."

The video was filmed at Silvercup Studios in Long Island City, Queens, New York City. It featured Marshall's friends as dancers, and Harry Druzd, a drummer and bartender, on drums, since White was not available for the video shoot. Marshall wore two outfits chosen by her, along with yellow nail polish and black bracelets "reminiscent of Madonna." The dancers performed in front of a white background using simple dance steps devised by Vapnek and hand gestures conceived by Marshall.

Vapnek later recalled her surprise when Marshall expressed her desire to lip sync in the video, which she explained was rarely done in indie rock videos of the time, and "kind of considered cheesy." However, Vapnek was excited by the idea, saying that "almost immediately I came up with the idea of doing a take-off on Madonna's "Lucky Star" video. Chan and I are almost the same age, and we grew up with Madonna. Madonna's first record came out when we were in junior high, and that 'Lucky Star' video was so iconic to us."

== Release and reception ==
Heather Phares of Allmusic described the song as "hypnotic and seductive." In a Stereogum article celebrating Moon Pix's 20th anniversary, Tom Brehihan wrote that "Cross Bones Style" was "the first Cat Power song that I ever heard and maybe still the best," describing it as "swirling, pulsating dream-pop with maybe the faintest hint of New Order in its groove."

In 2008, the song was included in Pitchfork's The Pitchfork 500. In 2010, it was ranked at number 129 in Pitchfork's "The Top 200 Tracks of the 1990s." In 2022, Pitchfork listed it at number 203 on their list of "The 250 Best Songs of the 1990s", writing, "You could spend a lifetime trying to detangle the spell cast by "Cross Bones Style", with its twilit guitars and peppy percussion that never quite falls in step with Chan Marshall's voice. Her vocals are doubled—weary yet hopeful, meditative and pleading—like a rope that braids and frays." Far Out named it the second best Cat Power song in 2025, with Andrew Clayman calling it "dreamlike and hypnotic, with a haunting chorus that hints at mighty Cat Power feats still to come."

In 2006, the music video was ranked at number 44 in Stylus' "Top 100 Music Videos of All Time" list.

=== Accolades ===
Publication	Country	Accolade	Year	Rank
Stylus	United States	Top 100 Music Videos of All Time	2006	44
Pitchfork	United States	The Top 200 Tracks of the 1990s	2010	129
Pitchfork	United States	The 250 Best Songs of the 1990s	2022	203
Far Out	UK	The 10 best songs by Cat Power	2025	2
