= City Streets (album) =

Studio album by Carole King
- Released: April 1989
- Studios: Skyline Studios (New York City, New York)
- Genre: Rock
- Length: 42:50
- Label: Capitol
- Producers: Carole King; Rudy Guess

Carole King chronology
Speeding Time (1983)	City Streets (1989)	Colour of Your Dreams (1993)

Professional ratings
Review scores
Source	Rating
AllMusic	2.0/5 stars
Chicago Tribune	2.5/4 stars
Deseret News	(Mixed)
Rolling Stone	2.0/5 stars

City Streets is the fourteenth studio album by American singer-songwriter Carole King, released in 1989. It was her first album after six-year hiatus from her recording career and was co-produced by Rudy Guess, who supported her as a backing guitarist in later years.

The title track features a guitar solo by Eric Clapton. It was released as a single and became a Top 20 hit in the US Billboard Adult Contemporary chart. Clapton also played the guitar on "Ain't That the Way". Another notable guest musician is Branford Marsalis, who played the saxophone on "Midnight Flyer".

Before making a comeback record, King fostered an acting career. "I Can't Stop Thinking About You" is a collaboration work with actor Paul Hipp, who co-starred with her in the off-Broadway show A Minor Incident in 1988. "Midnight Flyer" and "Someone Who Believes in You" were co-written by her former songwriting partner and husband Gerry Goffin. The latter was originally written for Air Supply vocalist Russell Hitchcock. His interpretation was initially featured on his eponymous solo debut released in 1987, and he remade the song on Air Supply's album The Earth Is..., four years later. It was also covered by Martha Wash in 1993 on her solo album.

Like her other efforts released in the 1980s, City Streets received mixed critical reviews and underperformed commercially, reaching only No. 111 on the Billboard 200. The album had been out of print worldwide since 1993, although a reissue was once planned by American Beat Records in 2007. In 2024, however, King re-released the album to digital platforms under her own imprint, Rockingale Records.

== Track listing ==
Side one
No.	Title	Writer(s)	Length
1.	"City Streets"	Carole King	5:00
2.	"Sweet Life"	King, Rudy Guess	4:34
3.	"Down to the Darkness"	King	4:17
4.	"Lovelight"	King	4:28
5.	"I Can't Stop Thinking About You" (Duet with Paul Hipp)	King, Paul Hipp	5:00

Side two
No.	Title	Writer(s)	Length
6.	"Legacy"	King, Guess	5:04
7.	"Ain't That the Way"	King	3:09
8.	"Midnight Flyer"	King, Gerry Goffin	4:27
9.	"Homeless Heart" (Duet with Sherry Goffin)	King, John Bettis	4:05
10.	"Someone Who Believes in You"	King, Goffin	2:56

== Personnel ==
- Carole King – vocals (1–4, 6–8, 10), synthesizers (1–3), rhythm guitar (2), acoustic piano (3, 7), MIDI piano (4, 6, 8–10), keyboards (4, 6, 8–10), lead vocals (5, 9), organ (7)
- Robbie Kondor – additional synthesizers (2, 6), synthesizers (4, 9), acoustic piano (5), organ (6, 8), synthesizer programming (10)
- Teddy Andreadis – additional acoustic piano (6)
- Eric Clapton – lead guitar (1), guitars (7)
- Rudy Guess – rhythm guitar (1, 2), lead guitar (2), guitars (3, 4, 6, 8, 9), electric guitar (5), mandolin (8)
- Mark Bosch – acoustic guitar (5), electric guitar (5)
- Paul Hipp – acoustic guitar (5), featured vocals (5)
- Wayne Pedzwater – bass (1, 2, 5–10)
- Seth Glassman – bass (3, 4)
- Steve Ferrone – drums (1, 3, 6, 7, 9)
- Max Weinberg – drums (2)
- Omar Hakim – drums (5, 8), cymbals (10)
- Jimmy Bralower – tambourine (1, 8), cowbell (2), timpani (3), electronic drums (4), percussion (4)
- Sammy Figueroa – percussion (3, 6, 7, 9, 10)
- Michael Brecker – tenor saxophone (1)
- Jimmy Roberts – tenor saxophone (5)
- Branford Marsalis – soprano saxophone (8)
- Nick Lane – trombone (5)
- Jimmy Zavala – harmonica (8)
- Richard Hardy – flute (10)
- Sherry Goffin – backing and featured vocals (9)
- Heidi Berg – additional backing vocals (9)
- Angela Capell – additional backing vocals (9)
- Kacey Cisyk – additional backing vocals (9)

Production

- Tom Whalley – executive producer
- Carole King – producer
- Rudy Guess – producer
- James Farber – digital recording, mixing
- Eugene "UE" Nastasi – second engineer
- John Kubick – digital editing
- Greg Calbi – mastering
- Sterling Sound (New York, NY) – editing and mastering location
- Lorna Guess – production coordinator
- Tommy Steele – art direction
- Jeffrey Fey – design
- Caroline Grayshock – photography
- Susan Cameron for Cameron Enterprises – management

== Chart positions ==
Chart (1989)	Position
Australia (Kent Music Report)	40
Canadian RPM Albums Chart	66
Dutch Albums Chart	67
U.S. Billboard 200	111
