= The Honeydrippers: Volume One =

Studio album (mini-album) by the Honeydrippers
- Released: 24 September 1984
- Recorded: March 1984
- Studios: Atlantic, New York; Marcus, London
- Genres: Rock and roll; jump blues; rhythm & blues
- Length: 18:07
- Labels: Es Paranza; Atlantic
- Producers: Nugetre; The Fabulous Brill Brothers

Professional ratings
Review scores
Source	Rating
AllMusic	4/5 stars

The Honeydrippers: Volume One is a mini-album released on 24 September 1984, by The Honeydrippers, a band led by the rock singer Robert Plant. The project originated when Atlantic Records president Ahmet Ertegun wanted to record an album of his favourite songs from the 1950s. Plant was chosen because Ertegun had seen his pick-up band the Honeydrippers performing 1950s standards. Included in the band were Chic front man Nile Rodgers, Late Night with David Letterman bandleader Paul Shaffer, and former Yardbirds guitarists Jeff Beck and Jimmy Page—the latter was also Plant's former bandmate in Led Zeppelin.

The album was re-released in a remastered edition in 2007 as part of a Plant remaster series, with the live version of "Rockin' at Midnight" (previously released on the 12-inch single version of the studio recording) included as a bonus track. Plant and Ertegun discussed the possibility of doing another Honeydrippers album, but with the latter's death in December 2006, the plan was shelved permanently.

== Track listing ==
1984 vinyl edition Side one
No.	Title	Writer(s)	Length
1.	"I Get a Thrill"	Rudy Toombs	2:39
2.	"Sea of Love"	George Khoury, Phil Phillips	3:03
3.	"I Got a Woman"	Ray Charles, Renald Richard	2:58

Side two
No.	Title	Writer(s)	Length
1.	"Young Boy Blues"	Doc Pomus, Phil Spector	3:30
2.	"Rockin' at Midnight"	Roy Brown	5:57

=== 2007 remaster bonus tracks ===
- "Rockin' at Midnight" (live in Birmingham NEC, September 8, 1985) – 4:14

1984 Compact disc edition
Same track listing and order as the vinyl release.

== Personnel ==
- Robert Plant – vocals
- Jeff Beck – lead guitar ("I Got a Woman" and "Rockin' at Midnight")
- Jimmy Page – lead guitar ("Sea of Love" and "I Get a Thrill")
- Nile Rodgers – rhythm guitar
- Paul Shaffer – piano
- Dave Weckl – drums
- Wayne Pedzwater – bass
- Keith Evans – saxophone ("Rockin' at Midnight")

=== Bonus track personnel ===
- Robert Plant – vocals
- Robbie Blunt – guitars
- Paul Martinez – bass
- Jezz Woodroffe – keyboards
- Richie Hayward – drums

==== The King Bees (a.k.a. The Uptown Horns) – horns ====
- Crispin Cioe: alto saxophone, baritone saxophone
- Bob Funk: trombone
- Arno Hecht: tenor saxophone
- Paul Litteral: trumpet

==== The Queen Bees – backing vocals ====
- Ula Hedwig
- Chrissie Faith
- Millie Whiteside

=== Production ===
- Producers: Nugetre (Ahmet Ertegun) and the Fabulous Brill Brothers (Robert Plant & Phil Carson)

== Charts ==
=== Album ===
Chart (1984)	Peak position
Australian Albums Chart	13
Canadian RPM Top 100 Chart	1
German Albums Chart	40
Swedish Albums Chart	44
UK Albums Chart	56
US Billboard 200	4
US Billboard Top R&B Albums	67

=== Singles ===
Year	Single	Chart	Position
1984	"Rockin' at Midnight"	US Billboard Top Rock Tracks	8
1985	"Rockin' at Midnight"	US Billboard Hot 100	25
1985	"Rockin' at Midnight"	US Cash Box Top 100 Singles	28
1985	"Rockin' at Midnight"	Canadian RPM Top 100 Chart	18
1985	"Rockin' at Midnight"	US Billboard Hot Dance Club Songs	24
1984	"Sea of Love"	US Billboard Top Rock Tracks Chart	11
1984	"Sea of Love"	US Billboard Adult Contemporary	1
1984	"Sea of Love"	Canadian RPM Top 100 Chart	1
1985	"Sea of Love"	US Billboard Hot 100	3
1985	"Sea of Love"	Canadian RPM Adult Contemporary Chart	1
1985	"Sea of Love"	US Cash Box Top 100 Singles	3
1985	"Sea of Love"	Dutch Singles Chart	25
1985	"Sea of Love"	Irish Singles Chart	29
1985	"Sea of Love"	German Singles Chart	48
1985	"Sea of Love"	UK Singles Chart	56
1985	"Sea of Love"	Swiss Singles Chart	25
1985	"Sea of Love"	Australia	5

== Certifications ==
Country	Sales	Certification
United States (RIAA)	1,000,000+	Platinum
Canada (CRIA)	300,000+	3× Platinum
