= Katie Webster =

American boogie-woogie pianist (1936–1999)

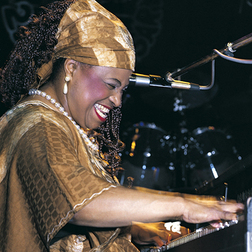

Background information
- Born: Kathryn Jewel Thorne; January 11, 1936; Houston, Texas, United States
- Died: September 5, 1999 (aged 63) League City, Texas, United States
- Genres: Boogie-woogie, soul, swamp blues
- Occupations: Musician, pianist, vocalist, composer, singer, songwriter
- Instruments: Piano, vocals, percussion

Katie Webster (January 11, 1936 – September 5, 1999), born Kathryn Jewel Thorne, was an American boogie-woogie pianist.

== Career ==
Webster was initially best known as a session musician behind Louisiana musicians on the Excello and Goldband record labels, such as Lightnin' Slim and Lonesome Sundown. She also played piano with Otis Redding in the 1960s, but after his death went into semi-retirement.

In the 1980s she was repeatedly booked for European tours and recorded albums for the German record label, Ornament Records, with Gary Wiggins and Chris Rannenberg (The International Blues Duo). She cut You Know That's Right with the band 'Hot Links', and the album that established her in the United States: The Swamp Boogie Queen with guest spots by Bonnie Raitt and Robert Cray. Two-Fisted Mama! was released in 1989. She performed at both the San Francisco Blues Festival and Long Beach Blues Festival. No Foolin'! was released in 1991.

Webster suffered a stroke in 1993 while touring Greece but returned to performing the following year. She died from heart failure in League City, Texas, in September 1999.

== See also ==
- List of swamp blues musicians
- List of Louisiana blues musicians
- New Orleans rhythm and blues
- Music of Louisiana
- Swamp blues
- List of New Orleans blues musicians
- Louisiana blues
