= Rod Bernard =

American singer (1940–2020)

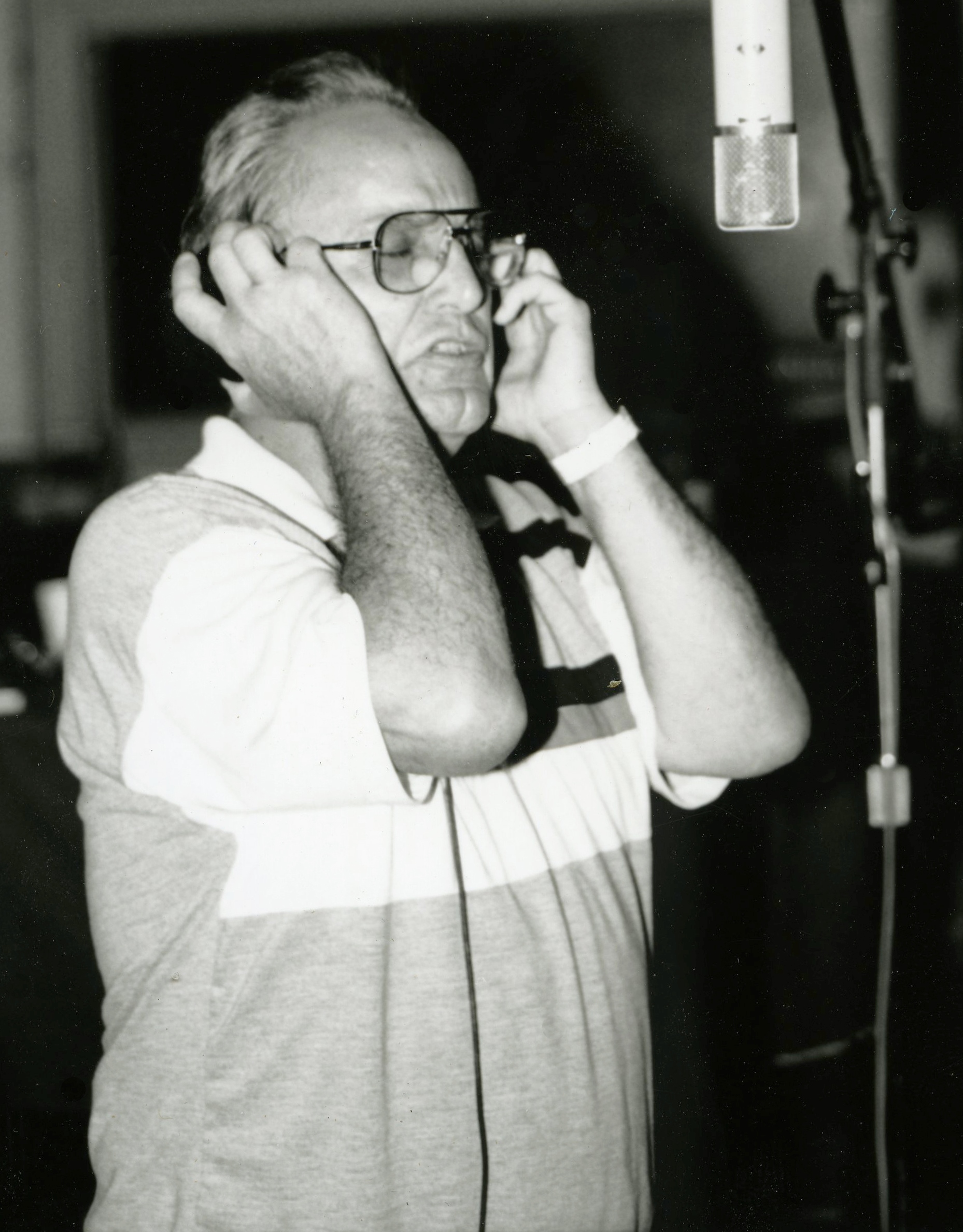
- Rod Bernard, La Louisianne Studio, Lafayette, La., ca. 1999.

Background information
- Born: Rodney Ronald Louis Bernard; August 12, 1940
- Origin: Opelousas, Louisiana, U.S.
- Died: July 12, 2020 (aged 79) New Iberia, Louisiana, U.S.
- Genres: Swamp pop; Cajun; country; rockabilly
- Occupations: Television Advertising Salesman; Radio Advertising Salesman; Disc Jockey
- Instruments: Rhythm guitar; Vocals
- Years active: 1958–2020
- Labels: Carl, Jin, Argo, Crazy Cajun, La Louisianne, Arbee, CSP, etc.
- Formerly of: The Twisters, The Shondells, Warren Storm

Rod Bernard (August 12, 1940 – July 12, 2020) (Note: Layne, Mark. "Swamp Pop Star Rod Bernard died Sunday". KVPI-FM.) was an American singer who helped to pioneer the musical genre known as "swamp pop", which combined New Orleans-style rhythm and blues, country and western, and Cajun and black Creole music. He is generally considered one of the foremost musicians of this south Louisiana-east Texas idiom, along with such notables as Bobby Charles, Johnnie Allan, Tommy McLain, and Warren Storm.

== Life and career ==
Bernard was born in Opelousas, Louisiana. His parents were French-speaking Cajuns from working-class backgrounds and, as a child, he imbibed the traditional Cajun French music performed in his grandfather's dancehall, the Courtableau Inn, located in nearby Port Barre. There, he heard the music of noted Cajun musicians Aldus Roger, Papa Cairo, and Jimmy C. Newman, as well as zydeco pioneer Clifton Chenier, all of whom would exert a strong influence on Bernard's music.

Around age eight, Bernard obtained his first guitar (an acoustic Gene Autry model) and, around 1950, he began to perform with the Blue Room Gang, a Cajun-country (or "Cajun swing" in the vein of western-swing music) troupe, sponsored by local Red Bird brand sweet potatoes. During this period, Bernard also hosted his own live music radio program on KSLO in Opelousas, singing Cajun and country tunes while strumming his guitar, in emulation of his musical hero, Hank Williams, Sr.

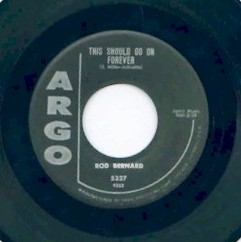
Label of "This Should Go On Forever", Argo records, 1959.

In the mid-1950s, however, Bernard came under the influence of rock and roll and rhythm and blues music, especially the sounds of Fats Domino and Elvis Presley. Around 1957 he helped to form a rock 'n' roll band made up of fellow Opelousas teenagers. Calling themselves The Twisters, they recorded two singles for the obscure Carl label of Opelousas. The next year Bernard and his group recorded the sultry ballad "This Should Go On Forever" for Floyd Soileau's Jin label of Ville Platte, Louisiana. Leased to Argo Records of Chicago, the song became a national hit in 1959, propelling Bernard onto Dick Clark's American Bandstand, The Dick Clark Saturday Night Beechnut Show, and The Alan Freed Show, as well as onto tours with Jerry Lee Lewis, Frankie Avalon, Chuck Berry, and B. B. King, among others.

A follow-up single for Argo, "You're On My Mind", backed with "My Life Is A Mystery", failed to achieve the success of his initial national release. In late 1959, Bernard signed with producer Bill Hall of Beaumont, Texas, who switched the artist to Mercury Records, which unwisely replaced Bernard's earthy swamp pop style with lush violin sections and female choruses. Only one minor hit, "One More Chance", emerged from these Nashville sessions.

Around 1962, Bernard left Mercury for Bill Hall's own Hall-Way label in Beaumont, Texas. Recording with local artists Johnny Winter and Edgar Winter, he released several notable tunes, including "Fais Do Do", "Who's Gonna Rock My Baby", and a rock 'n' roll version of the Cajun folksong "Allons Danser Colinda", the latter of which achieved national airplay (as "Colinda") and remains a regional favorite in south Louisiana and east Texas.

A stint in the U.S. Marine Corps boot camp interrupted Bernard's musical career but, after several months, he returned to south Louisiana to form The Shondells (not to be confused with Tommy James' group) with fellow swamp pop musicians Warren Storm and Skip Stewart. (Bernard served in the Marine Corps Reserve from 1962 to 1968, reaching the rank of sergeant.) During the mid-1960s, the group recorded several singles for the La Louisianne label of Lafayette, Louisiana, and they hosted a live dance program on KLFY-TV called "Saturday Hop". This program inspired their circa 1965 album, The Shondells at the Saturday Hop, issued on La Louisianne.

During this period Bernard recorded singles for Huey Meaux's Teardrop and Copyright labels, and for Soileau's familiar Jin label. Isolated singles appeared on the Scepter and Shelby Singleton's SSS International labels. These sessions included notable releases such as the Chuck Berry-type rocker "Recorded in England", the Cajun two-step inspired "Papa Thibodeaux", and the doleful ballad "Congratulations To You Darling".

Bernard performed infrequently during the 1970s, but returned to his roots by releasing several country and western albums, including Country Lovin and Nightlights And Love Songs. He also issued the album Boogie in Black and White with Clifton Chenier, considered a milestone by many because of its raucous blend of Cajun and black Creole elements. One music writer, John Broven, described it as "a wild and woolly rock 'n' roll set with spontaneity one normally only dreams about," while another, Larry Benicewicz, claimed that "such a masterpiece, no doubt, spawned other 'experiments' like Wayne Toups' 'ZydeCajun' style or, perhaps, a Zachary Richard 'Zach Attack,' a similar fusion of Cajun, zydeco, and R&B."

Around 1980, he recorded an album of Fats Domino favorites for Jin, titled A Lot of Dominoes, but the masters disappeared until around 1991, when the tracks were finally released (albeit only on cassette). In 2003, he recorded his first new album in over two decades. Titled Louisiana Tradition, the compact disk appeared on the CSP label of Forney, Texas, and included several new songs, as well as reworkings of vintage south Louisiana tunes like fellow swamp pop musician Bobby Charles' "Later Alligator".

In June 2006, Bernard re-recorded his spoken-word single "A Tear In The Lady's Eye", which he had originally written and recorded in 1968 as a pro-military response to anti-Vietnam War protestors. (The "Lady" of the song is the Statue of Liberty.) In the revised version, however, Bernard addressed Americans who opposed the ongoing war in Iraq. At his own expense, Bernard pressed a handful of CD singles containing the revision, which he distributed for airplay to select radio stations and programs, mainly in south Louisiana.

Many of Bernard's songs have been reissued on compact disk, both in the U.S. and abroad, and continue to receive much regional airplay. Significantly, younger generations of south Louisiana musicians, including C. C. Adcock, Marc Broussard, and Zachary Richard, have acknowledged him as a strong musical influence. (Note: Orteza, Arsenio (2009-06-19) [1997]. "Zachary Richard (1997)". Rock Is Dead But Won't Lie Down.)

Bernard last performed in public in 2015 at the Ponderosa Stomp music festival in New Orleans. He retired from his career as a radio advertising executive in January 2018.

On July 12, 2020, Bernard's son announced his father's death, following a short illness. Bernard was 79. (Note: "Swamp pop legend Rod Bernard dies". KATC (TV). New Iberia, Louisiana. 2020-07-13.)

== Selected discography ==
=== Singles ===
- "All Night In Jail"/"Set Me Free", Carl, (matrix numbers J8OW-1229/J8OW-1230 [issued w/o record number]), 1957.
- "Linda Gail"/"Little Bitty Mama", Carl, (matrix numbers H8OW-2441/H8OW-2442 [issued w/o record number]), 1957.
- "This Should Go On Forever"/"Pardon Mr. Gordon", Jin 105, 1958; Argo 5327, 1959.
- "You're On My Mind", Argo 5338, 1959.
- "One More Chance", Mercury 71507, 1959.
- "Colinda"/"Who's Gonna Rock My Baby", Hall-Way 1902, 1962. ("Colinda" also on Tomorrow's Hits (Vee-Jay Records album))
- "Fais Do Do"/"New Orleans Jail", Hall-Way 1906, 1962.
- "Forgive", Hall 1915, 1962.
- "Diggy Liggy Lo", Hall 1917, 1963.
- "Our Teenage Love"/"Doing The Oo-Wa-Woo", Tear Drop 3044, 1964.
- "You're The Reason I'm in Love"/"My Jole Blon", Tear Drop 3052, 1965.
- "No Money Down"/"Little Green Man", Tear Drop 3060, 1965.
- "Recorded in England"/"This Should Go On Forever", Tear Drop 3117, 1965.
- "Recorded in England"/"Somebody Wrote That Song for Me", Arbee 101, 1965.
- "These Were Our Songs"/"Just Another Lie", Arbee 105, 1966.
- "These Were Our Songs"/"Recorded in England", Scepter 12195, 1967.
- "Papa Thibodeaux", Copyright 2316, 1968.
- "Congratulations To You Darling", Jin 232, 1968.
- "New Orleans Jail"/"Big Mamou", Jin 240, 1969.
- "Sometimes I Talk in My Sleep", Jin 325, 1975.

=== LPs ===
- Rod Bernard, Jin 4007, ca. 1965.
- Country Lovin, Jin 9008, 1974.
- Night Lights and Love Songs, Jin 9010, 1975.
- Boogie in Black and White [with Clifton Chenier], Jin 9014, 1976.
- This Should Go On Forever And Other Bayou Classics, Crazy Cajun 1086, 1978.

=== Cassettes ===
- A Lot of Dominos, Jin 4012, 1991.

=== CDs ===
(* = compilation)

- Swamp Rock 'n' Roller, Ace [UK] CDCHD 488, 1994.*
- The Essential Collection, Jin 9056, 1998.*
- Cajun Blue, Edsel 593 [UK], 1999.*
- Louisiana Tradition, CSP 1018, 1999.
- Boogie in Black and White [with Clifton Chenier], Jin 9014, 1976; issued on CD, 2014.
