= Sid Lawrence =

Welsh footballer

Personal information
- Date of birth: 16 March 1909
- Place of birth: Penrhiwceiber, Wales
- Height: 5 ft 9 in (1.75 m)
- Position: Full back

Senior career*
| Years | Team | Apps | (Gls) |
| 1930–1939 | Swansea Town | 311 | (11) |
| 1939–1940 | Swindon Town | 1 | (0) |
| Total | | 312 | (11) |

International career
| 1931–1935 | Wales | 8 | (0) |
- * Club domestic league appearances and goals

Sid Lawrence (born 16 March 1909) was a Welsh international footballer. He was part of the Wales national football team between 1931 and 1935, playing 8 matches. He played his first match on 5 December 1931 against Ireland and his last match on 5 October 1935 against Scotland.

== See also ==
- List of Wales international footballers (alphabetical)
