= Two-Fisted Mama! =

Studio album by Katie Webster
- Released: 1989
- Studio: Streeterville
- Genre: Blues
- Label: Alligator
- Producer: Katie Webster, Bruce Iglauer, Vasti Jackson, Ice Cube Slim

Katie Webster chronology
The Swamp Boogie Queen (1988)	Two-Fisted Mama! (1989)	No Foolin'! (1991)

Two-Fisted Mama! is an album by the American musician Katie Webster, released in 1989. Webster promoted the album with a North American tour. The album was nominated for a Bammy Award, in the "Blues Album" category.

== Production ==
The album was produced by Webster, Bruce Iglauer, Vasti Jackson, and Ice Cube Slim. The Memphis Horns guested on Two-Fisted Mama! Webster wrote or cowrote six of the album's songs; "So Far Away" is a cover of the Dire Straits song. "Red Negligee" is done in a talking blues style. Many songs address women listeners by providing relationship advice.

== Critical reception ==
Professional ratings
Review scores
Source	Rating
AllMusic	4/5 stars
Chicago Tribune	3/4 stars
Robert Christgau	B+
The Encyclopedia of Popular Music	4/5 stars
MusicHound Blues: The Essential Album Guide	3/5 stars
The Penguin Guide to Blues Recordings	3/4 stars

Robert Christgau wrote: "Boogie as in woogie, not as in bar band, is her gift—a rolling piano style she certainly didn't invent and just as certainly owns—and here the experts get it down." Newsday noted that, "like most great blues artists, she uses the irregular, the unexpected, to make musical points; where others might use a melisma, she sings the phrase straight and sweet; she purrs where others would growl, and vice versa."

The Chicago Tribune wrote that Webster delivers "some comic relief with sharp and funny tales of the war between the sexes." The Edmonton Journal called Two-Fisted Mama! "one of the most rewarding blues albums of the year," writing that "Webster is a superb, soulful singer and an immense piano player." The Syracuse Herald-Journal praised Webster's "bawdy, quick-paced style."

AllMusic deemed the album "another impressive showcase for Katie Webster's rollicking 88s and earthy vocals."

== Track listing ==
No.	Title	Length
1.	"Two-Fisted Mama"
2.	"Stood Up Again"
3.	"Red Negligee"
4.	"C.Q. Boogie"
5.	"Never Let Me Go"
6.	"Love Deluxe"
7.	"Pussycat Moan"
8.	"Money Honey or Honey Hush"
9.	"I'm Still Leaving"
10.	"The Katie Lee"
11.	"So Far Away"
