= Hippy Ti Yo =

Hippy Ti Yo (also spelled Hippy To Yo, Hip Et Taiau, Les Huppes Taiauts, Hippy-Ty-Yo, Hippy-Tai-Yo, Hippitiyo, Tayeaux Dog Tayeaux) is a traditional melody that was first recorded as Ils La Volet Mon Trancas, sung by Cajun musician Cleoma Breaux in 1934 in San Antonio, Texas. The melody would later be adapted into many different songs throughout history.

== Music ==
=== Origins ===
The song is an old tune about a mysterious creature, women or a couple of dogs, Hip and Taiaud, who prowl about stealing things off the farm, engendering the ire of the farmer which makes them return the items. Origin of the phrase is suggested to belong to the Cajuns of the Cajun prairies. In the film "American Patchwork", Alan Lomax makes a loose claim stating cowboys from Texas heard the phrase being used as they drove their cattle across the Cajun prairies to be sold in New Orleans. He makes the assumption that this phrase is the origins of the call "Whoopie Ti Yi Yo".

Author Raymond E. Francois describes a different origin. The French word "Huppe", used colloquially, means clever while "taiaut" comes from the English shout tally-ho, and refers to a hound dog, thus "clever hounds".

The earliest recording of the song is believed to be a 1934 version sung by Cleoma Breaux and played by Joe Falcon entitled "Ils La Volet Mon Trancas", recorded in San Antonio, Texas (Bluebird B-2191). Later that year, the Breaux Brothers would record the same melody as the tune "T'as vole mon chapeau" (Vocalion 02961). In 1962, Joe Falcon explains he picked up the song from black Creoles, one named Sidney Babineaux.

The following year in 1935, Leo Soileau and His Three Aces used the same melody for his song "Hackberry Hop" (Bluebird B-2086). The song refers to the town of Hackberry, Louisiana which is located about 30 miles from U.S. Route 90. Several years later, the familiar melody would appear in a 1953 rockabilly called "Route 90" by Clarence Garlow on Flair Records (#1021). The melody is eerily similar in chord progression as well as in the vocal pattern.

- Ils La Volet Mon Trancas Listen (MP3)

Cajun French

C'est Hip et Taiau les chiens,
Qui a volé mon traîneau, Chere
Quand ils ont vu j'étais fou, chere
Ils rapporté mon traîneau, chere
C'est Hip et Taiau les chiens,
Qui a volé mon manteau, Chere
Quand ils ont vu j'étais fou, chere
Ils rapporté mon manteau, chere
C'est Hip et Taiau les chiens,
Qui a volé mon chapeau, Chere
Quand ils ont vu j'étais fou, chere
Ils rapporté mon chapeau, chere

English

It's the Hip and Taiau dogs
Who stole my sled, dear
When they saw I was crazy, dear
They brought my sled, dear
It's the Hip and Taiau dogs
Who stole my coat, dear
When they saw I was crazy, dear
They brought my coat, dear
It's the Hip and Taiau dogs
Who stole my hat, dear
When they saw I was crazy, dear
They brought my hat, dear

Eventually, in 1962, Sidney Babineaux would record a similar-sounding melody entitled "Zydeco Sont Pas Sale".

=== Late 20th century and recent covers ===
- Hackberry Hop, Harry Choates & His Melody Boys (1947)
- Hippitiyo, Hackberry Ramblers (1947)
- Hippy Ti Yo, Bobby Page And The Riff Raffs (1958)
- Hippy Ti Yo, Doug Kershaw (1973)
- Hippy Ti Yo, Jimmy Newman (1973)
- Hip Et Taiau, Nathan Abshire (1978)
