= Tomorrow's Hits (Vee-Jay Records album) =

Tomorrow’s Hits

Compilation album by Various artists
- Released: June 1962
- Label: Vee-Jay Records

Tomorrow's Hits is a 1962 compilation album issued by Vee-Jay Records. Unlike most compilations, the album showcased not songs which had already been issued, but songs which had mainly yet to be issued. Alongside established artists, the album introduced some unknown artists: Rod Bernard, The Sheppards, Ray Whitley, Grover Mitchell, Norman Charles, and the Bill Allen Trio.

== Track listing ==
Side one

- "Walk On With The Duke" – Duke Of Earl
- "Please Help" – The Dukays
- "Come To Me" – The Sheppards
- "Colinda" – Rod Bernard (originally: Hall-Way 1902)
- "Yessiree Yessiree" – Ray Whitley
- "Bye, Bye Blues" – Bill Allen & Trio

Side two

- "You Won't Be Sorry" – Jerry Butler
- "Fever" – Dee Clark
- "Welcome Stranger" – Wade Flemons
- "That's A Good Idea" – Grover Mitchell
- "Dance On Little Girl" – Dee Clark
- "Climb Every Mountain" – Norman Charles
