= Swamp pop =

Music genre originating amongst the Creole or Cajun peoples in and of Louisiana

- Stylistic origins: Cajun music; New Orleans rhythm and blues; country; rock and roll; rockabilly; zydeco
- Cultural origins: 1950s, Acadiana region, Louisiana, United States

Swamp pop is a music genre indigenous to the Acadiana region of south Louisiana and an adjoining section of southeast Texas. Created in the 1950s by young Cajuns and Creoles, it combines New Orleans–style rhythm and blues, country and western, and traditional French Louisiana musical influences. Although a fairly obscure genre, swamp pop maintains a large audience in its south Louisiana and southeast Texas homeland, and it has acquired a small but passionate cult following in the United Kingdom, and Northern Europe.

== Characteristics ==
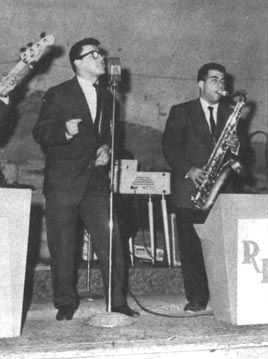
Swamp pop musician Jivin' Gene, c. 1959

The swamp pop sound is typified by highly emotional, lovelorn lyrics, tripleting honky-tonk pianos, undulating bass lines, bellowing horn sections, and a strong rhythm and blues backbeat. It is exemplified by slow ballads such as Cookie and his Cupcakes' "Mathilda" (recorded 1958), considered as the unofficial swamp pop anthem. But the genre has also produced many upbeat compositions, such as Bobby Charles' "See You Later, Alligator" (1955), popularly covered by Bill Haley & His Comets.

During the genre's heyday (1958–1964), several swamp pop songs appeared on national U.S. record charts. These included Jimmy Clanton's "Just A Dream" (1958), Warren Storm's "Prisoner's Song" (1958), Phil Phillips' "Sea Of Love" (1959), Rod Bernard's "This Should Go On Forever" (1959), Joe Barry's "I'm a Fool to Care" (1960), and Dale & Grace's "I'm Leaving It Up to You" (1963).

In swamp pop's south Louisiana–southeast Texas birthplace, fans regarded many songs that never became national hits as classics. These include Johnnie Allan's "Lonely Days, Lonely Nights" (1958), Buck Rogers' "Crazy Baby" (1959), Randy and the Rockets' "Let's Do the Cajun Twist" (1962), T. K. Hulin's "I'm Not a Fool Anymore" (1963), and Clint West's "Big Blue Diamond" (1965), among numerous others.

== Roots and early history ==
The musicians who went on to birth swamp pop listened to (and often performed) traditional Cajun music and Creole music (which later developed into zydeco) as children, as well as popular country and western (hillbilly) songs by musicians including Bob Wills, Moon Mullican, and Hank Williams. However, as with other American youth in the mid-1950s, they discovered the alluring new sounds of rock and roll and rhythm and blues musicians such as Elvis Presley, Little Richard and Fats Domino. As a result, these teenaged Cajuns and Creoles shifted away from Louisiana French folk compositions including "Jolie Blonde", "Allons a Lafayette", and "Les flammes d'enfer", in favor of singing rock and roll and rhythm and blues compositions in English. At the same time, they switched from folk instruments such as the accordion, fiddle, and iron triangle to modern ones including as the electric guitar and bass, upright piano, saxophone, and drumming trap set.

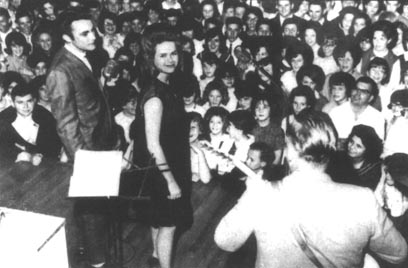
Swamp pop duo Dale & Grace, c. 1963

By the late 1950s, swamp pop musicians had developed their own distinct sound and repertoires. They performed to receptive crowds in local dancehalls encompassing the Southern Club in Opelousas, Landry's Palladium in Lafayette, the OST Club in Rayne, and the Green Lantern in Lawtell. In addition, they released recordings on local record labels, such as Floyd Soileau's Jin label of Ville Platte, Eddie Shuler's Goldband of Lake Charles, Carol Rachou's La Louisianne of Lafayette, Huey P. Meaux's Crazy Cajun label of Houston, and a number of labels owned by J. D. Miller of Crowley, Louisiana (who also recorded swamp pop tunes for larger national labels, such as Ernie Young's Excello Records label of Nashville).

Swamp pop musicians often adopted Anglo-American stage names that masked their Cajun surnames. John Allen Guillot, for example, became Johnnie Allan, Robert Charles Guidry became Bobby Charles, Joe Barrios adopted Joe Barry, Elwood Dugas became Bobby Page, and Terry Gene DeRouen was billed as Gene Terry. Some of these musicians changed their names because they were ashamed of their rural French heritage — a feeling shared at the time by a segment of the Cajun population. But economics motivated most swamp pop musicians: They wanted to sell records not only in southern Louisiana and southeast Texas, but beyond, where the pronunciation of ethnic surnames sauch as Guillot, Barrios, and DeRouen eluded record promoters, disc jockeys, and consumers.

Despite its obvious rock and roll and rhythm and blues influences, swamp pop was not devoid of folk characteristics. For example, Bobby Page and the Riff Raffs recorded "Hippy-Ti-Yo", a bilingual rock and roll version of the traditional Cajun French song "Hip et Taiaut" and Rod Bernard did the same with "Allons danser Colinda", another folk composition. Joe Barry re-recorded his swamp pop hit "I'm A Fool To Care" in French under the title "Je suis bête pour t'aimer". Randy and the Rockets issued "Let's Do The Cajun Twist", an English remake of the Cajun French favorite "Allons a Lafayette".

== Legacy ==
From 1950s to 1960s, swamp pop songs have appeared in the Billboard Top 40. While swamp pop drew heavily on New Orleans rhythm and blues, it reciprocated by making a detectable impact on songs including Lloyd Price's "Stagger Lee"(number 1, 1959), and Clarence "Frogman" Henry's "(I Don't Know Why) But I Do" (number 4, 1961) (Bobby Charles compositions). Swamp pop also left its imprint on the related but distinct genre known as "swamp blues", including Slim Harpo's "Rainin' in My Heart". Bobby Charles released the album Bobby Charles (1972) that included "Small Town Talk".

Leon Russell, Delaney & Bonnie, Dale Hawkins, Tony Joe White, John Fogerty and Creedence Clearwater Revival were influenced by swamp pop. Swamp pop's impact on popular music is heard in the Rolling Stones' cover of Barbara Lynn's "You'll Lose a Good Thing" and "Oh Baby (We Got A Good Thing Goin')", the Honeydrippers' rendition of Phil Phillips' "Sea of Love", Elvis Presley's cover of Lloyd Price's "Lawdy Miss Clawdy", and even The Beatles' swamp-inspired "Oh! Darling".

Swamp pop influenced Tejano music, particularly the recordings of Freddy Fender's early swampy songs "Before the Next Teardrop Falls" and "Wasted Days and Wasted Nights" in 1975. South Louisiana and southeast Texas audiences generally consider Fender a full-fledged swamp pop musician.

Although swamp pop began a slow decline with the onslaught of the mid-1960s British Invasion, the genre continues to draw devoted fans to south Louisiana and southeast Texas festivals and nightclubs. Some younger non-swamp musicians, such as Cajun artist Zachary Richard and C. C. Adcock, have acknowledged a strong swamp pop influence.

== See also ==
- Swamp blues
- Swamp rock
