= Johnnie Allan =

American singer-songwriter (born 1938)

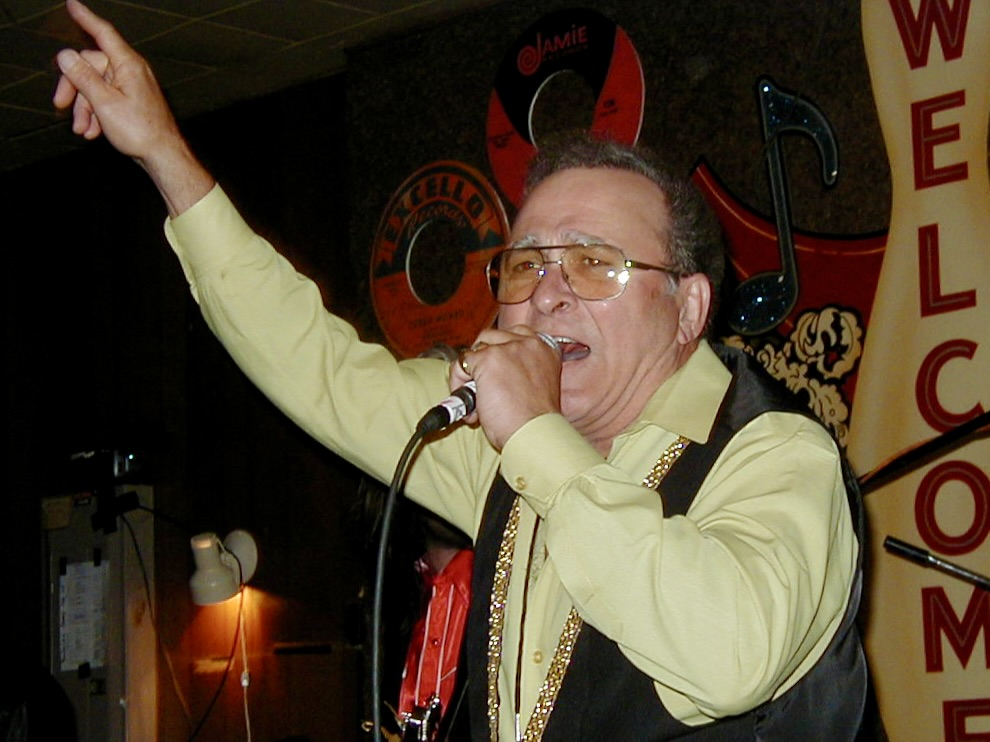
- Johnnie Allan (2004)

Background information
- Born: John Allen Guillot; March 10, 1938 (age 88); Rayne, Louisiana, U.S.
- Genres: Cajun, swamp pop
- Occupations: Musician, guitarist, vocalist
- Instruments: Vocals, guitar
- Labels: Jin Records, Flyright Records, Ace Records, Swallow Records

Johnnie Allan (born John Allen Guillot, March 10, 1938) is an American pioneer of the swamp pop musical genre.

== Career ==
Born in Rayne, Louisiana, United States, Allan, a Cajun, grew up in a musical family, and at age six obtained his first guitar. (His mother, the former Helen Falcon, was the goddaughter of Joseph Falcon and Cleoma Falcon, the first Cajun recording artists, and sometimes played rhythm guitar for their live performances.) By age 13, Allan was playing with Walter Mouton and the Scott Playboys, a traditional Cajun music band. About two years later, he switched to Lawrence Walker and the Wandering Aces, another traditional Cajun band.

In 1956, he saw Elvis Presley perform live on the Louisiana Hayride music program, and shortly afterwards Allan began to play rock and roll music. In 1958, he left Walker to form the Krazy Kats. That same year he recorded "Lonely Days, Lonely Nights" for Jin Records of Ville Platte, Louisiana. He later recorded for Mercury Records and the Viking label of Crowley, Louisiana, among others.

He returned to the Jin label in the early 1970s and went on to record many notable swamp pop tunes, including his versions of Chuck Berry's "Promised Land" and Merle Haggard's "Somewhere on Skid Row".

A perennial favorite of swamp pop fans globally, Allan has performed in Europe many times. He is author of two music-related books, Memories: A Pictorial History of South Louisiana Music (1988) and Born to Be a Loser (1992, with Bernice Larson Webb), a biography of swamp pop musician Jimmy Donley.

A retired educator, he lives in Lafayette, Louisiana.

== Discography ==
=== Albums ===
- South to Louisiana (LP-4001 Jin Records, 1964)
- Johnnie Allan Sings (LP-9002 Jin Records, 1972)
- Dedicated to You (LP-9006 Jin Records, 1974)
- A Portrait of Johnnie Allan (LP-9012 Jin Records, 1976)
- Another Man's Woman (LP-9015 Jin Records, 1976)
- Johnnie Allan's Greatest Hits (LP-9017 Jin Records, 1977) compilation
- Louisiana Swamp Fox (LP-9019 JIn Records, 1979)
- Good Timin' Man (FLY LP-551 Flyright Records, 1980)
- Cajun Country (LP-9022 Jin Records, 1980)
- Thanks For the Memories (LP-9026 Jin Records, 1983)
- Promised Land (810 598-1 Polydor Records, 1983; 200.001 VIP Records, 1983) compilation
- South to Louisiana (CH-145 Ace Records, 1985)
- Sings Cajun Now (LP-6069 Swallow Records, 1987)
- Promised Land (CDCHD-380 Ace Records, 1992) compilation
- Swamp Pop Legend: The Essential Collection (CD-9044 Jin Records, 1995) compilation
- The Ultimate Louisiana Experience (CD-9052 Jin Records, 1996)
- Essential Collection: The Second Volume (CD-9065 Jin Records, 1999) compilation
- Memories (CD-9087 Jin Records, 2008)
- Shine On and Favorites From the Past (CD-9094 Jin Records, 2011)
- Something Old, Something New (CD-9107 Jin Records, 2020)

== Bibliography ==
- John Broven, South to Louisiana: Music of the Cajun Bayous (Gretna, Louisiana: Pelican Press, 1983). ISBN 978-0882896083
- Shane K. Bernard, Swamp Pop: Cajun and Creole Rhythm and Blues (Jackson: University Press of Mississippi, 1996). ISBN 978-0878058969
