= Phil Phillips =

American musician (1926–2020)

Background information
- Born: John Philip Baptiste; March 14, 1926; Crowley, Louisiana, U.S.
- Died: March 14, 2020 (aged 94) Lake Charles, Louisiana, U.S.
- Genres: Swamp pop
- Occupations: Singer; songwriter
- Website: Official Facebook

John Philip Baptiste (March 14, 1926 – March 14, 2020), known as Phil Phillips, was an American singer and songwriter, best known for his 1959 song, "Sea of Love".

== Biography ==
Baptiste was encouraged to pursue a career as a singer after a school performance of a song called "Sweet Slumber". He performed with his brothers in a gospel group called the Gateway Quartet and worked as a bellhop before he recorded "Sea of Love" in 1959.

The song was arranged and produced by Eddie Shuler for neighbor George Khoury's Khoury Records. After three months of work on the arrangement, building up the vocal group and trying out different musicians, the song was ready for release. Baptiste changed his name to Phil Phillips, and dubbed his backing vocalists the Twilights. After a Baton Rouge disc jockey played the song repeatedly, the recording sold heavily and was leased to Mercury Records.

"Sea of Love" went to No. 2 in the U.S. Billboard Hot 100 pop chart and spent 14 weeks in the top 40, as well as reaching No. 1 on the R&B chart. Additionally, it sold over one million copies, and was awarded a gold disc. Nonetheless, Phillips was paid only $6,800 as an artist, and received no further royalties for the song or its recording.

Phillips did not release an album to capitalize on his success, due to the unfavorable terms of his deal. "Because I decided to fight for what was rightfully and legally mine, a full album that I recorded was never released. I'm not being paid, nor have I ever been paid, as an artist for 'Sea of Love'. I never received justice and to this day have not received justice."

The song remains a big seller with notable covers by Del Shannon (which reached No. 33 on the pop chart in 1982) and the Honeydrippers (which peaked at No. 3 spending 14 weeks in the top 40 in 1984). Phillips' original version was featured prominently in the 1989 film Sea of Love starring Al Pacino which also presents a cover version by Tom Waits that plays during the end credits. Cat Power's The Covers Record also achieved a moderate success.

Among Phillips' other songs is "No One Needs My Love Today" (1966), which was recorded by Samantha Juste, co-host of BBC TV's Top of the Pops. He also recorded an anti-drug spoken word recording, "The Evil Dope", in the late 1960s; the single is considered a cult classic.

Phillips later worked as a radio DJ. He married and had seven children.

In October 2007, Phillips was honored for his contributions to Louisiana music with induction into the Louisiana Music Hall of Fame.

One of his last live performances was in April 2005 at the Jazz Fest in New Orleans, Louisiana, a few months before Hurricane Katrina. He died on March 14, 2020, his 94th birthday.
