= The Honeydrippers =

1980s English rock and roll band

- Origin: England
- Genres: Rock and roll; jump blues; rhythm and blues
- Years active: 1981–1985, 2006
- Label: Es Paranza/Atlantic
- Past members: Robert Plant; Andy Silvester; Kevin O'Neill; Ricky Cool; Jim Hickman; Keith Evans; Wayne Terry; Robbie Blunt; Jimmy Page; Jeff Beck; Paul Shaffer; Nile Rodgers; Wayne Pedzwater; Dave Weckl; Brian Setzer; Keith "Bev" Smith; Ernest Chataway

The Honeydrippers were an English rock and roll band of the 1980s. Former Led Zeppelin lead singer Robert Plant formed the group in 1981 to satisfy his long-time goal of having a rock band with a heavy rhythm and blues basis. Formed originally in Worcestershire from an existing cover band, it has had many members come and go, including fellow former Led Zeppelin member Jimmy Page, Jeff Beck (a former Yardbirds member like Page), and other friends and well-known studio musicians, including original Judas Priest guitarist Ernest Chataway. The band released only one recording, an EP titled The Honeydrippers: Volume One, on 12 November 1984.

The Honeydrippers peaked at number 3 in early 1985 on the Billboard Hot 100 with a remake of the Phil Phillips' tune "Sea of Love", and hit number 25 with "Rockin' at Midnight", originally a Roy Brown recording and a rewrite of "Good Rockin' Tonight". With the EP's success, Plant stated that a full album would be recorded, but it never was.

== Origins ==
There are a number of views on the origin(s) of the name Honeydrippers. Paul Stenning (2008) says Plant joined a Midlands blues cover band called "The Honeydrippers". In this telling, the band and its name existed prior to Plant: it is unstated who came up with the name and what it means. In Paul Rees's 2013 biography, Plant joined a "makeshift" cover band, and Plant gave the band its name, inspired by Roosevelt Sykes, an American blues singer known as "Honeydripper". Jean-Michael Guesdon in his 2018 book Led Zeppelin, All the Songs says the name is an allusion to the Led Zeppelin song "Black Dog", which contains the lyric "Watch your honey drip, can't keep away". Another theory is that it is derived from 1940s R&B star Joe Liggins, his most popular song was "The Honeydripper", and it was also the name of his backing band. The term "honeydripper" is black slang for the vagina or a female lover; it can also mean a male lover who frequently says ("drips") sweet nothings to his female lover.

== Members ==
Original lineup (1981)

- Robert Plant – vocals
- Andy Silvester – guitar
- Kevin O'Neill – drums
- Ricky Cool – harmonica
- Jim Hickman – bass
- Keith Evans – saxophone
- Wayne Terry – bass
- Robbie Blunt – guitar

The Honeydrippers: Volume One lineup (1984)

- Robert Plant – vocals
- Jimmy Page – guitars
- Jeff Beck – guitars
- Paul Shaffer – keyboards
- Nile Rodgers – guitars, co-producer
- Wayne Pedzwater – bass
- Dave Weckl – drums
- Brian Setzer – guitar (guest appearance)
- Keith "Bev" Smith – drums

== Discography ==
- The Honeydrippers: Volume One (1984), US number 5, US R&B number 67, UK number 56
