= Goldband Records =

American record label

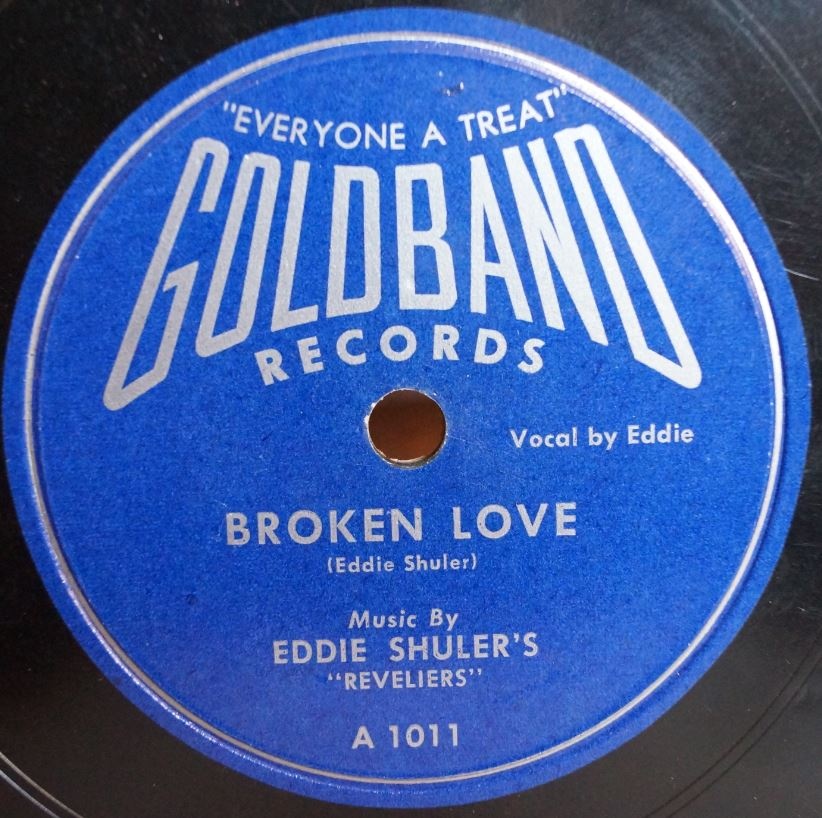
- Founded: 1945
- Genre: Cajun, R&B, country, swamp blues, swamp pop
- Country of origin: U.S.
- Location: Lake Charles, Louisiana
- Official website: www.purecajun.com/goldband/

Goldband Records is an American record label based in Lake Charles, Louisiana, founded in 1945 and best known for its Cajun and R&B recordings in the 1950s and 1960s. Its founder, Eddie Shuler, claimed "the record business is nearly always 90% hype and 10% record".

== History ==
Goldband Records with Eddie and Elsie Shuler in foreground, right

The company was established by Edward Wayne Shuler Sr. (March 27, 1913 – July 23, 2005). Shuler was born in Wrightsboro, Texas, and moved to Lake Charles in 1942 to work in an oil refinery. He played guitar with The Hackberry Ramblers before forming his own band, The All-Star Reveliers, which performed on radio station KPLC in 1945. Shuler formed Goldband Records that year, originally to record his own group, but soon diversified into releasing records by other local bands. In 1948 he began releasing records by accordionist Iry LeJeune, on two subsidiary labels, Folk Star and TNT - among the first Cajun recordings released - and in 1951 The Reveliers had their own regional hit with "Ace of Love".

In the early 1950s, Shuler established the Goldband complex—including recording studio, record store, and TV store—in Lake Charles, and began recording all genres of music, including R&B, blues, country, rock and roll, swamp pop, zydeco and Cajun music. Hit recordings included Boozoo Chavis's "Paper in My Shoe" (1954) and the company's biggest seller, Phil Phillips's "Sea of Love" (1959). Goldband was also the first to record Dolly Parton (then 13 years old), with "Puppy Love" (1960). Other artists recording for Goldband included Sidney Brown, Rockin' Sidney, Jo-El Sonnier, and Freddy Fender.

The company thrived with Cajun regional successes through the 1960s, but changing tastes in the 1970s led to a decline in its fortunes. By the time of Shuler's death in 2005 it was the longest established independent record label. Today, it has become a mail order record company using their online site.

The Goldband studio buildings in Lake Charles were demolished in May 2017.

The Goldband Recording Corporation archival collection, which includes original sound recordings, papers, and photographs, resides at the University of North Carolina at Chapel Hill within the Southern Folklife Collection.
