= A Dying Cub Fan's Last Request =

Single by Steve Goodman

from the album Affordable Art
- Released: 1981
- Recorded: 1981
- Length: 6:02
- Songwriter: Steve Goodman

"A Dying Cub Fan's Last Request" is a folk song written by Steve Goodman in 1981 and first performed by him on a WGN radio show that year. The song tells the story of a Chicago Cubs fan looking back at decades of supporting the struggling baseball team. Goodman wrote the song in the spring of 1981, just before that year's Major League Baseball strike interrupted the season. Goodman, a native of Chicago, incorporated a number of specific references to the city, the Cubs, and their baseball stadium, Wrigley Field.

At the time of the song's release, the Cubs had not been to a World Series since 1945 and had not won one since 1908. By 1981, the team was under new ownership and was trying to shed its image as a hapless team. The song's lyrics seem to make fun of the Cubs, referring to the team as "the doormat of the National League", and such references strained the relationship between Goodman and the team's executives.

Goodman later composed "Go, Cubs, Go", which became the team's victory song. That song has been described as overly sentimental, and Goodman was said to have written it that way to subtly poke fun at the team's criticism of "A Dying Cub Fan's Last Request". Goodman died of leukemia in 1984, and some of his ashes were surreptitiously scattered at Wrigley Field, consistent with the lyrics of "A Dying Cub Fan's Last Request".

== Background ==
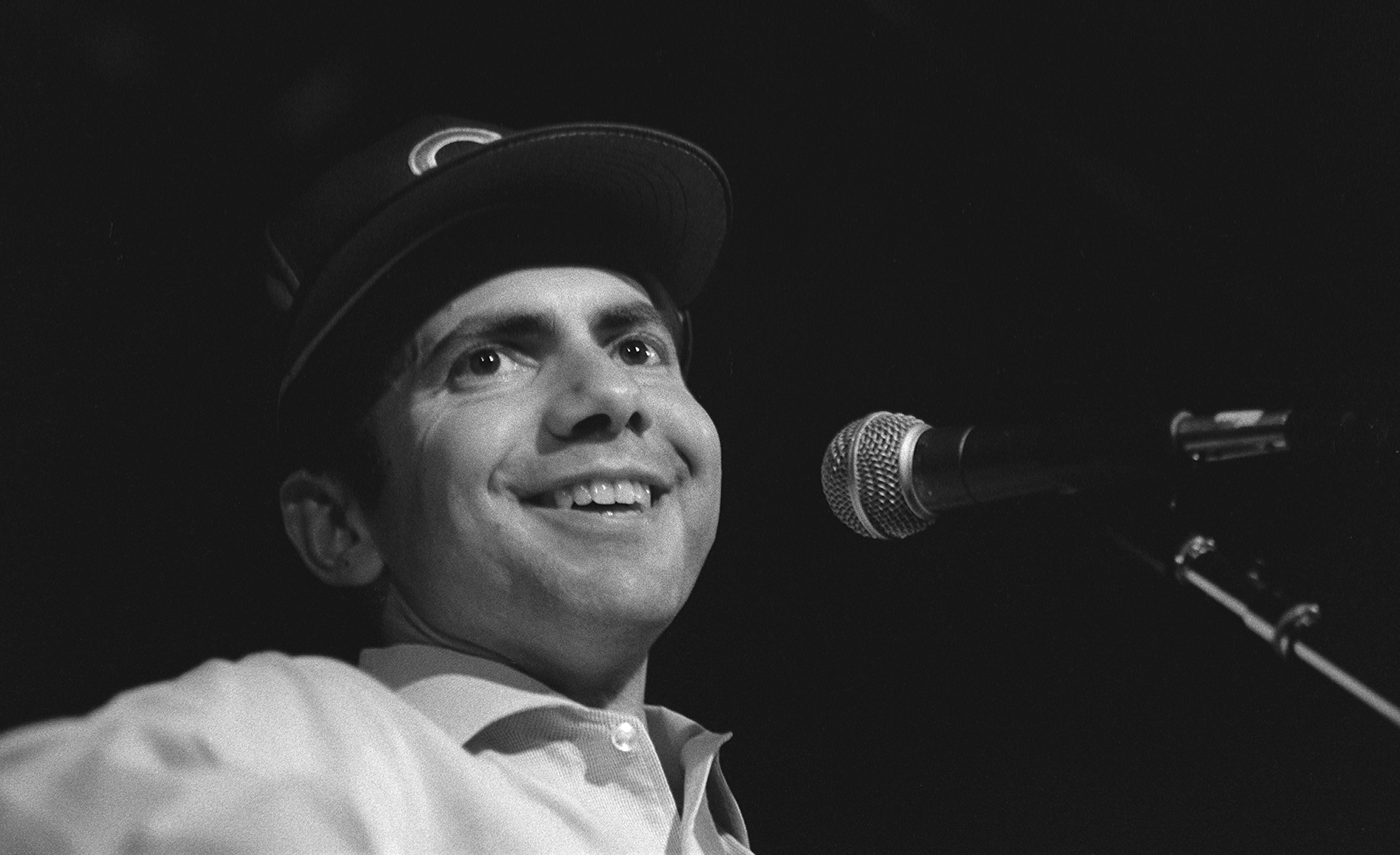
Goodman in 1983

In the summer of 1980, William Wrigley III sold the Chicago Cubs baseball team to the Chicago Tribune. The Cubs had a longstanding reputation as the "Lovable Losers", as they had not won a World Series since 1908 and had not played in one since 1945. In the fall of 1981, Dallas Green was hired as the team's general manager, and Green installed a number of personnel from his former organization, the Philadelphia Phillies. Shortly after he joined the team, he told the press that the Cubs needed more help than he had realized, calling the team "a disaster area". Green was particularly critical of the negative attitudes of employees across the organization.

Singer-songwriter and Chicago native Steve Goodman was born in 1948 and grew up attending Cubs baseball games. His great uncle, Harry Romanoff, worked for Chicago newspapers and knew an usher at the Wrigley Field ticket gate, so Goodman could get into the stadium for free. Goodman was a student at Lake Forest College in the late 1960s when he began performing at Chicago music venues.

Goodman's songwriting credits included "City of New Orleans", which was recorded by Goodman, Arlo Guthrie, Johnny Cash, Judy Collins, and Willie Nelson. He had wanted to compose a song about baseball for many years, and he used a baseball analogy to explain his lack of progress on that front to his biographer, Clay Eals. "I get about three-quarters of the way through it, and then I walk somebody and take myself out," Goodman told Eals.

Goodman moved from Chicago to Los Angeles with his wife and two daughters about a year before writing "A Dying Cub Fan's Last Request".

== Composition and lyrics ==
The 1981 Major League Baseball strike interrupted that season beginning in June, and Goodman was asked whether he had written the song because of the strike. "Actually I wrote it the night of March 13th in a hotel in Cincinnati, Ohio," Goodman said. He explained that he was about to put on a concert in Chicago and he wanted concertgoers—especially his family and friends—to have a new song to enjoy. He said he began thinking about the looming start of the baseball season and the historic lack of success of his Cubs teams.

The song presents a cynical but affectionate look at the Cubs from the perspective of a fan who has been through many losing seasons with the team. The fan, a dying old man, is telling his friends of his wishes to have his coffin carried around Wrigley Field before having his ashes thrown into a bonfire on the field. The song refers to the Cubs as "the doormat of the National League". Goodman had been treated for leukemia since 1969, but despite having a serious illness when he wrote the song, Goodman said "A Dying Cub Fan's Last Request" was not autobiographical, according to his manager, Al Bunetta. "I always did believe it was about Stevie, but he said no. He never equated it to himself. He never looked at himself as dying," Bunetta explained.

"A Dying Cub Fan's Last Request" contains several references to the city of Chicago and to the Chicago Cubs. The song's opening lines (By the shores of old Lake Michigan / Where the hawk wind blows so cold) refer to a colloquial term for the wind in Chicago. The man in the song compares his crushed hopes to popcorn being eaten by pigeons beneath the "L" tracks. He wants his ashes to blow over the Wrigley Field wall and ultimately come to rest on Waveland Avenue, the street that runs behind the ballpark's left field bleachers. He mentions bidding the bleacher bums adieu.

Much of the song consists of spoken word, but the chorus is sung. A reference in the chorus to "their ivy-covered burial ground" refers to Wrigley Field, which has unique outfield walls covered with ivy planted in 1937.

Do they still play the blues in Chicago
When baseball season rolls around?
When the snow melts away, do the Cubbies still play
In their ivy-covered burial ground?

Some well-known Cubs personalities are mentioned by name in the song. Keith Moreland (Have Keith Moreland drop a routine fly) was a 1980s Cubs player with good hitting ability but poor fielding. Ernie Banks (Hey Ernie, let's play two) was twice voted the National League Most Valuable Player and was later inducted into the Baseball Hall of Fame. He would often say "Let's play two!" to indicate his love for baseball. The song also mentions Jack Brickhouse, a sportscaster who covered Cubs games from the 1940s to 1981.

== Release and reception ==
Accompanied by Jethro Burns on banjo, Goodman performed "A Dying Cub Fan's Last Request" on a 1981 WGN radio show hosted by Roy Leonard. He had performed the song the night before at the Park West theater. Goodman released the song on his own record label, known as Red Pajamas Records, as Elektra/Asylum Records had dropped him after the release of the 1980 album Hot Spot. The song was included on Goodman's 1984 album Affordable Art.

Bonnie Stiernberg, music editor of Paste magazine, said that the song is "everything one could possibly want a song about the Cubs to be—devastating, self-deprecating, nostalgic, full of that Midwestern wryness that you need to make it through harsh winters and decades of losing seasons." She wrote that it was "easy to see why they don’t play it at Wrigley (referring to the Cubs as “the doormat of the National League” and asking “do they still play the blues in Chicago when baseball season rolls around/when the snow melts away, do the Cubbies still play in their ivy-covered burial ground?” doesn't exactly get a crowd hyped)". Stiernberg called the song "a strong piece of evidence should one choose to argue that the depressing songs about the Cubs are the best songs about the Cubs."

Chicago Tribune columnist Bill Jauss wrote that Goodman was not intending to criticize the Cubs with his song. "He's merely pouring out the emotions of one who has pulled for the team from the days of Chiti to 'Bull' Durham," Jauss wrote, referring to 1950s catcher Harry Chiti and 1980s outfielder Leon Durham. Cubs executives disagreed. WGN-TV program director Dan Fabian said that the song "made [general manager Dallas] Green nuts. He said we didn't need that kind of negativity anymore. He hated the line about 'doormat of the National League.' He said that Steve Goodman is no fan of the Cubs." Goodman was not allowed to perform the song at Wrigley Field.

Mark Caro of the Chicago Tribune wrote that "A Dying Cub Fan's Last Request" is a "blackly comic folk ballad [that] details fans' hopes being perpetually crushed". Columnist Bob Greene referred to the song as a "warm, funny, bittersweet song". Yardena Arar of the Associated Press said that "in the mock-serious lament of Goodman's moribund hero, many will recognize their own past." Scott Benarde of the Fort Lauderdale Sun-Sentinel wrote that the song was "just plain upbeat and funny". In 2018, the song was number one on an Omaha World-Herald list of the nine best baseball songs ever recorded.

== Legacy ==
In 1984, the Cubs finally made the playoffs and Goodman was asked to sing the national anthem at a playoff game, but he died of leukemia days before his scheduled appearance. Consistent with the lyrics of "A Dying Cub Fan's Last Request" ("Let my ashes blow in a beautiful snow ... / And I will come to my final resting place, out on Waveland Avenue."), Goodman's friends sneaked into Wrigley Field and deposited some of his ashes there. The rest were scattered at Doubleday Field near the Baseball Hall of Fame.

Goodman wrote another song for the Cubs, called "Go, Cubs, Go", soon after the release of "A Dying Cub Fan's Last Request". The new tune caught on as the opening song for WGN radio broadcasts of Cubs games. In 2007, it became the song played at the ballpark after a Cubs win. The song is often described as overly sentimental or saccharine, and Goodman is said to have written it that way as a subtle jab at Green's criticism of "A Dying Cub Fan's Last Request". Rich Bird of The Times of Northwest Indiana suggested that fans would more easily identify with the cynical song: "[I]f there was ever a song that put into words and music the heartbreak, longing, and near-laughable anxiety of the long-suffering followers of the Cubs, it's Goodman's song, 'A Dying Cub Fan's Last Request'."

Just before opening day in 2008, the season that marked a century since a Cubs World Series title, Dan Pashman discussed the song on the NPR segment called The Best Song in the World Today, and he compared it favorably to "Go, Cubs, Go". Pashman grew up as a New York Yankees fan, but he said he was listening to "Go, Cubs, Go" after a 2003 Cubs win when he realized that he had become a Cubs fan. "But that's not the best song in the world today. Because to really call yourself a Cubs fan, you have to experience some serious pain," Pashman said, explaining how "A Dying Cub Fan's Last Request" captured the disappointment he felt about two weeks later, when the Cubs narrowly missed out on the 2003 World Series.
