= Windy City (nickname) =

Nickname for Chicago, Illinois, US

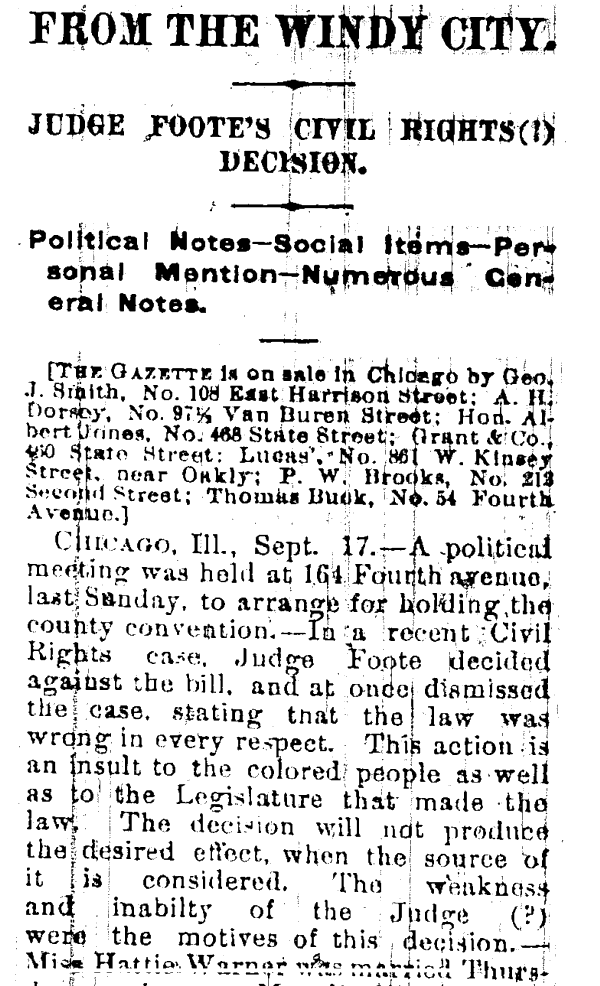
This newspaper article was published by the Cleveland Gazette in 1885.

The city of Chicago has been known by many nicknames, but it is most widely recognized as the "Windy City".

Earlier known references to the "Windy City" were to Green Bay in 1856 and Buffalo, New York in the 1840s and 1850s. The first known repeated effort to label Chicago with this nickname is from 1876 and involves Chicago's rivalry with Cincinnati. The popularity of the nickname endures to this day, more than a century after the Cincinnati rivalry ended.

== Etymology ==
There are four main possibilities to explain the city's nickname: the weather, as Chicago is near Lake Michigan; the rivalry with Cincinnati; the World's fair; and the politics.

=== Weather ===
While Chicago is widely known as the "Windy City", it is not the windiest city in the United States. Some of the windier cities recorded by the NOAA/NCDC are Dodge City, Kansas, at 13.9 mph (22.3 km/h); Amarillo, Texas, at 13.5 mph (21.7 km/h); and Lubbock, Texas, at 12.4 mph (20 km/h). Chicago is not significantly windier than any other U.S. city. For example, the average annual wind speed of Chicago is 10.3 mph (16.6 km/h); Boston: 12.4 mph (20.0 km/h); Central Park, New York City: 9.3 mph (15.0 km/h); and Los Angeles: 7.5 mph (12.1 km/h).

The following "windy city" explanation involving a "wind tunnel" effect is from the Freeborn County Standard of Albert Lea, Minnesota, on November 20, 1892:

Chicago has been called the "windy" city, the term being used metaphorically to make out that Chicagoans were braggarts. The city is losing this reputation, for the reason that as people got used to it they found most of her claims to be backed up by facts. As usual, people go to extremes in this thing also, and one can tell a stranger almost anything about Chicago today and feel that he believes it implicitly.
But in another sense Chicago is actually earning the title of the "windy" city. It is one of the effects of the tall buildings which engineers and architects apparently did not foresee that the wind is sucked down into the streets. Walk past the Masonic Temple or the Auditorium any day even though it may be perfectly calm elsewhere, and you will meet with a lively breeze at the base of the building that will compel you to put your hand to your hat.

An explanation for Chicago being a naturally breezy area is that it is on the shores of Lake Michigan.

Chicago had long billed itself as an ideal summer resort because of its cool lake breeze. The Boston Globe of July 8, 1873, wrote that "a few years ago, Chicago advertised itself as a summer resort, on the strength of the lake breezes which so nicely tempered the mid-summer heats." The Chicago Tribune of June 14, 1876, discussed "Chicago as a Summer Resort" at length, proudly declaring that "the people of this city are enjoying cool breezes, refreshing rains, green fields, a grateful sun, and balmy air—winds from the north and east tempered by the coolness of the lake, and from the south and west, bearing to us frequent hints of the grass, flowers, wheat and corn of the prairies."

The February 4, 1873, Philadelphia Inquirer called Chicago "the great city of winds and fires."

=== Cincinnati rivalry ===
Cincinnati and Chicago were rival cities in the 1860s and 1870s. Cincinnati was well known in the meatpacking trade and it was called "Porkopolis" from at least 1843. Starting from the early 1860s, Chicago surpassed Cincinnati in this trade and claimed the very same "Porkopolis" nickname.

The baseball inter-city matches were especially intense. The 1869 Cincinnati Red Stockings were the pride of all of baseball, so Chicago came up with a rival team called the White Stockings to defeat them. "Windy City" often appeared in the Cincinnati sporting news of the 1870s and 1880s.

Four of the first known citations of "Windy City" are from 1876, all involving Cincinnati:

1. Chicago Tribune, April 20, 1876, headline: "The WINDY CITY Jay-Rollers La-Crosse Team Wins Inaugural Game against Cincinnati Nannies."
2. The Cincinnati Enquirer, May 9, 1876, headline: "THAT WINDY CITY. Some Freaks of the Last Chicago Tornado."
3. The Cincinnati Enquirer, May 13, 1876: "Only the plucky nerve of the eating-house keeper rescued the useful seats from a journey to the Windy City."
4. Chicago Tribune, July 2, 1876: "The Cincinnati Enquirer, in common with many other papers, has been waiting with great anxiety for the fulfillment of its prophecy: that the Chicago papers would call the Whites hard names when they lost. Witness these scraps the day after the Whites lost to the Athletics: There comes a wail to us from the Windy City."

=== World's Fair Myth ===
It is a popular myth that the first person to use the term "Windy City" was The New York Sun editor Charles Dana, in a New York Sun article in the 1890s complaining about Chicago's victory in 1890 over New York in its bid to host the World's Fair. However, the term was in common use since at least 1886, while the first known use of it as a nickname was from 1876. As Chicago did not win the bid to host the World's Fair until 1890, Dana cannot possibly have been the source of the term.

=== Politics ===
The Chicago Tribune describes Chicago as a "windy city" regarding its people in an 1858 issue, as did the Milwaukee Journal Sentinel in 1860. Nineteenth-century journalists frequently referred to Chicago as the Windy City because they allegedly believed Chicagoan politicians were nothing but profit-centric (i.e. "full of wind", or "full of hot air"). Notably, many of these journalists were based in New York City, which at the time had a rivalry with the growing metropolis of Chicago. Based on this etymology, the epithet of the "Windy City" was originally derogatory, but it was reclaimed by Chicagoans over time to the point that it has lost its negative connotation and is a point of pride for many.

=== "The Hawk" wind or Hawkins ===
Chicago's wind is often called "The Hawk". This term has long been popular in African American Vernacular English. The Baltimore Sun's series of columns in 1934 attempted to examine the origin of the phrase "Hawkins is coming" for a cold, winter wind. The first recorded Chicago citation is in the Chicago Defender, October 20, 1936: "And these cold mornings are on us – in other words 'Hawkins' has got us."

In the 1967 song, "Dead End Street", Chicago native Lou Rawls speaks the following intro:

I was born in a city that they call "The Windy City". They call it The Windy City because of the Hawk. "The Hawk" – almighty Hawk. "Mr Wind". Takes care of plenty of business around winter time...

It is also referenced in the first line of Steve Goodman's song, "A Dying Cub Fan's Last Request", is "By the shores of old Lake Michigan / Where the Hawk Wind blows so cold..."

The Albert Collins song "The Hawk" from his 1991 album Iceman is also about the Chicago wind, with a reference to a blizzard in the winter of '78 that shut down the city (likely the 1979 Chicago blizzard). The chorus repeats a variation of, "Now when you hear the people talk about their bird called the hawk / Now I'm gonna tell ya somethin' that'll make you let out a squawk."

== Other cities ==
Earlier mentions of a "windy city" referred to Green Bay in 1856 and Buffalo, New York in the 1840s and 50s, which was also called "City of (the) Winds".

Various other cities have also claimed the nickname "Windy City". They include:

- Baku, Azerbaijan, Küləklər şəhəri ("the City of Winds")
- Davao City, Philippines
- Edinburgh, Scotland
- Essaouira, Morocco, "Wind City of Africa"
- Hsinchu, "Windy City" of Taiwan
- Lethbridge, Alberta, Canada
- Luleå, Sweden, Den blåsiga staden ("The Windy City")
- Majalengka on Java, Indonesia ("the City of Wind")
- Newcastle, New South Wales, Australia
- Pachuca, Hidalgo in Mexico, La Bella Airosa ('The Beautiful Windy One')
- Philadelphia, Pennsylvania
- Port Elizabeth, South Africa
- Sliven, Bulgaria
- Vienna, Austria
- Wellington, New Zealand
- Zaragoza, Spain, La ciudad del viento ("The Windy City")
