= Santa Ana Winds (album) =

Studio album by Steve Goodman
- Released: 1984
- Studios: Alpha, Burbank, California; WFMT, Chicago, Illinois
- Genre: Folk rock
- Label: Red Pajamas
- Producer: Steve Goodman

Steve Goodman chronology
Affordable Art (1984)	Santa Ana Winds (1984)	Unfinished Business (1987)

Santa Ana Winds is an album by the American musician Steve Goodman. Goodman finished the album a short time before his 1984 death of leukemia, and it was released posthumously on his Red Pajamas label. The album was reissued by Omnivore Recordings in 2019, with bonus tracks.

== Production ==
Santa Ana Winds was produced by Goodman. Emmylou Harris and Kris Kristofferson contributed to the album. The album cover was shot at El Mirage Lake. "Face on the Cutting Room Floor" had been recorded by the Nitty Gritty Dirt Band. "You Better Get It While You Can (The Ballad of Carl Martin)" was recorded at Chicago's WFMT studio, with Jethro Burns on mandolin.

== Critical reception ==
Professional ratings
Review scores
Source	Rating
AllMusic	4/5 stars
Robert Christgau	B
The Encyclopedia of Popular Music	3/5 stars
MusicHound Rock: The Essential Album Guide	4/5 stars

Robert Christgau called the album "a fitting testament to a likable artist who often went soft around the edges." The Chicago Tribune deemed it "a fittingly eclectic monument to one of the funniest, most intelligent and most courageous performers who ever picked up a guitar."

AllMusic wrote that the album "is closer to a country album than anything else Goodman would ever make, and the sad tales of 'The Face on the Cutting Room Floor', 'Fourteen Days', and "'The One That Got Away' are the ones that carry the most weight." Reviewing a reissue, DownBeat praised the "jazz-infused reading" of "The Big Rock Candy Mountain". MusicHound Rock: The Essential Album Guide considered it to be Goodman's "best collection, produced just the way his music ought to be."

== Track listing ==
No.	Title	Writer(s)	Length
1.	"Face on the Cutting Room Floor"	Jeff Hanna, Jimmy Ibbotson, Steve Goodman
2.	"Telephone Answering Tape"	David Grisman, Goodman
3.	"The One That Got Away"	Goodman
4.	"Queen of the Road"	Hanna, Ibbotson, Goodman
5.	"Fourteen Days"	Goodman
6.	"Hot Tub Refugee"	Maple Byrne, Goodman
7.	"I Just Keep Falling in Love"	Bill LaBounty, Goodman
8.	"The Big Rock Candy Mountain"	Jim Rothermel, Goodman
9.	"Santa Ana Winds"	Mary Gaffney, Mike Jordan, Goodman
10.	"You Better Get It While You Can (The Ballad of Carl Martin)"	Goodman
