= Red Pajamas Records =

American independent record label

- Parent company: Oh Boy Records
- Founded: 1982
- Founder: Steve Goodman, Al Bunetta
- Defunct: 2013
- Distributor(s): Ryko Distribution (US), Fusion III (Canada), Proper Music Group (UK), I.R.D. (Italy), Shock Records (Europe), Elite Imports (NZ)
- Genre: Americana, country, folk
- Country of origin: U.S.
- Location: Nashville, Tennessee

Red Pajamas Records was an independent American record label founded in 1982 by Chicago singer-songwriter Steve Goodman and his manager Al Bunetta. Between 1983 and his death in 1984, Goodman released two albums on Red Pajamas: Artistic Hair and Affordable Art. Two more, Santa Ana Winds and the Grammy Award-winning Unfinished Business, were released posthumously in 1984 and 1987. Red Pajamas Records operated under the management of Oh Boy Records, which was owned by Goodman's friend John Prine. Red Pajamas released archival live performances by Goodman, compilations, and reissues of his earlier material. The label also released three recordings of tribute performances by Goodman's friends.

== Origin ==
Between 1971 and 1980, singer-songwriter Steve Goodman recorded first on the Buddah label, then on Asylum. During this time he wrote and recorded such enduring songs as "City of New Orleans", a 1972 Top 20 hit for Arlo Guthrie and a 1984 #1 Hot Country Single for Willie Nelson; and "You Never Even Call Me By My Name", which was made famous by David Allan Coe in 1974. Following the release of the album Hot Spot in 1980, his contract with Asylum ended and Goodman moved to Seal Beach, California. Goodman had been suffering from leukemia for more than ten years, and around this time he came out of remission. Performing was difficult and he wanted to record again, but not with a major label. He decided to create his own label, and Red Pajamas Records was born with the assistance of Goodman's long-time manager Al Bunetta.

== Early releases ==
For Goodman's first release on Red Pajamas, Bunetta and Dan Einstein edited down 70 hours of live performance tapes. The sources included concerts in Chicago, New York and Philadelphia, TV appearances on Austin City Limits and an HBO Johnny Cash special, and even bootleg concert tapes. (As Goodman's manager, Bunetta had for years been confiscating these tapes made by concertgoers who didn't have permission to record Goodman's shows.) The resulting album Artistic Hair was released in 1983. The title refers to the cover photo, which shows Goodman's chemotherapy-induced hair loss. At first, Red Pajamas Records was a mail-order business, with Goodman and his wife Nancy receiving orders for Artistic Hair and shipping copies themselves at a rate of 5 or 6 per day. When Goodman's condition improved he went back into the studio and recorded three more albums. Affordable Art, with both live and studio cuts, was released in 1983, but then Goodman died in September 1984. Santa Ana Winds was released posthumously late in 1984. The appropriately titled Unfinished Business was released in 1987, and in 1988 it won a Grammy Award for Best Contemporary Folk Album.

== Later releases ==
The next two Red Pajamas releases of Goodman's music were compilations drawn from the earlier Asylum material, followed by a two-disc retrospective with both live and studio cuts (No Big Surprise.) In 1996 The Easter Tapes was released, a live album edited from a series of performances taped by DJ Vin Scelsa at New York radio station WNEW-FM in the 1970s. The next five releases were reissues of the Asylum albums from 1975 to 1980. In 2000, another live album of a concert from the 1980s was released (Live Wire) and critics called it a treasure. In 2003, Red Pajamas released a video containing two of Goodman's performances on the TV program Austin City Limits from 1977 and 1982. The video included interviews with Goodman and others. A 2006 audio release featured Goodman in a 1978 concert at Chicago's Earl of Old Town, and included musicians Corky Siegel on harmonica, Hugh McDonald on bass, Jethro Burns on mandolin, and composer David Amram on pennywhistle and percussion. In 2008, the label released an Extended Play CD titled The Baseball Singles containing 4 Goodman songs with baseball-themed lyrics, including "Go, Cubs, Go." The final release in 2013 was Don't Blame Me, a live concert from 1973.

== Tributes ==
Red Pajamas produced three tributes featuring friends of Goodman, two on audio and one on video. The first was 1986's Tribute To Steve Goodman, with Prine, Bonnie Raitt, Fred Holstein, Bonnie Koloc and others. Next was My Old Man, compiled ten years later by Goodman's daughter Rosanna. The album included interpretations of Goodman's compositions by her friends Chris Brown, Kate Fenner and others, and included Rosanna's own delivery of the title tune, written by her father Steve about her grandfather Bud. The third tribute was the 2007 DVD Larger Than Life, a fundraiser for the Old Town School of Folk Music featuring Arlo Guthrie, Lyle Lovett, Jackson Browne, Emmylou Harris and John Prine.

== Discography ==
Year	Artist	Title	Number	Comments
1983	Goodman	Artistic Hair	RPJ-001	Live
1983	Goodman	Affordable Art	RPJ-002	
1984	Goodman	Santa Ana Winds	RPJ-003	First posthumous release
1986	Various	Tribute to Steve Goodman	RPJ-004	Live at Arie Crown Theatre
1987	Goodman	Unfinished Business	RPJ-005	Second posthumous release, Grammy award
1988	Goodman	The Best of the Asylum Years, Volume One	RPJ-006	Compilation
1988	Goodman	The Best of the Asylum Years, Volume Two	RPJ-007	Compilation
1994	Goodman	No Big Surprise - The Steve Goodman Anthology	RPJ-008	2 CD compilation (1 studio/1 live)
1996	Goodman	The Easter Tapes	RPJ-009	18 live tracks from WNEW-FM 1970's broadcasts, liner notes by Vin Scelsa
1998	Goodman	Jessie's Jig and Other Favorites	RPJ-010	Reissue of 1975 Asylum 7E1037, digitally remastered
1998	Goodman	Words We Can Dance To	RPJ-011	Reissue of 1976 Asylum 7E1061, digitally remastered
1999	Goodman	Say It In Private	RPJ-012	Reissue of 1977 Asylum 7E1118, digitally remastered
1999	Goodman	High and Outside	RPJ-013	Reissue of 1979 Asylum 6E174, digitally remastered
1999	Goodman	Hot Spot	RPJ-014	Reissue of 1980 Asylum 6E297, digitally remastered
2000	Goodman	Live Wire	RPJ-015	Live at Bayou Theater, early 1980s
2003	Goodman	Steve Goodman: Live From Austin City Limits	RPJ-500	VHS/DVD, from 1977 & 1982 shows, with guests John Prine and Jethro Burns
2006	Various	My Old Man: A Tribute to Steve Goodman	RPJ-016	Compiled by daughter Rosanna
2006	Goodman	Live at the Earl of Old Town	RPJ-017	Live, August 1978
2007	Various	Larger Than Life: A Celebration of Steve Goodman	RPJ-501	DVD of fundraiser tribute
2008	Goodman	The Baseball Singles	RPJ-018	Compilation EP with "Go, Cubs, Go", "A Dying Cub Fan's Last Request", "When The Cubs Go Marching In", "Take Me Out to the Ball Game"
2013	Goodman	Don't Blame Me	RPJ-019	Live, April 1, 1973, Chicago

== See also ==
- Oh Boy Records
- Go, Cubs, Go
- Steve Goodman
- List of record labels
- John Prine
