= Somebody Else's Troubles =

Studio album by Steve Goodman
- Released: 1972
- Studios: Atlantic (New York City); Bell Sound (New York City)
- Genres: Folk, country
- Length: 36:12 (reissue)
- Label: Buddah
- Producer: Arif Mardin

Steve Goodman chronology
Steve Goodman (1971)	Somebody Else's Troubles (1972)	Jessie's Jig & Other Favorites (1975)

Somebody Else's Troubles is an album by singer/songwriter Steve Goodman, released in 1972. The record received favorable reviews but failed to sell. Goodman soon left Buddah Records and signed with Elektra Records. Bob Dylan contributes piano on the title song under the pseudonym of Robert Milkwood Thomas. John Prine is standing second person from left to right. Jimmy Buffett is standing between Prine and Goodman's wife Nancy. In 1990, the album was released on CD by Sequel Records.

The album was reissued in 1999 with two additional tracks.

== Reception ==
Professional ratings
Review scores
Source	Rating
AllMusic	3/5 stars
Christgau's Record Guide	B
Q	3/5 stars

Ian Dove of The New York Times wrote, "Mr. Goodman has been allowed to bring all his influences into the album, and as a result we get a fully rounded portrait of the artist. It is a deceptively casual album—'laid back' in the argot—recorded in Nashville and New York, but which has much strength and realism in its simplicity... Mr. Goodman's accompaniment is also kept simple and direct." Robert Christgau assigned it a "B" rating, indicating "...two consecutive songs about racing the sun, which is at least one too many. Tour de force: an a cappella ballad about a Vietnam widow. Arif Mardin found the proper setting for his young man's quaver." John Baudie in Q called the album "more assured [and] runs through the whole gamut of Goodman's range".

In reviewing the 1999 reissue, AllMusic critic Sharon Witmer wrote "This recording presents a good overview of the prodigious talent and gifts that Steve Goodman gave the music world."

== Track listing ==
1. "The Dutchman" (Michael Peter Smith) – 4:18
2. "Six Hours Ahead of the Sun" (Steve Goodman) – 4:38
3. "Song for David" (Goodman) – 3:06
4. "Chicken Cordon Blues" (Goodman, Paula Ballan, Tony Mandel) – 3:03
5. "Somebody Else's Troubles" (Goodman) – 3:48
6. "The Loving of the Game" (Victoria Garvey) – 3:00
7. "I Ain't Heard You Play No Blues" (Goodman) – 0:56
8. "Don't Do Me Any Favors Anymore" (Goodman) – 3:33
9. "The Vegetable Song (The Barn Yard Dance)" (Carl Martin) – 2:38
10. "Lincoln Park Pirates" (Goodman) – 3:35
11. "The Ballad of Penny Evans" (Goodman) – 3:37
  Reissue bonus tracks:
12. "I'm My Own Grandpaw" (Goodman, Moe Jaffe, Dwight Latham) – 3:32
13. "The Auctioneer" (Leroy Van Dyke, Buddy Black) – 5:08

== Personnel ==
- Steve Goodman – vocals, guitar
- David Bromberg – dobro, guitar, mandolin
- Steve Burgh – bass, guitar, mandolin
- Hugh McDonald – bass, guitar
- Robert Milkwood Thomas – piano, backing vocals on "Somebody Else's Troubles" [Bob Dylan]
- Jeff Gutcheon – keyboards, piano
- Arif Mardin – piano
- Mark Horowitz – banjo, guitar
- Bill Keith – banjo, pedal steel guitar
- Hugh McCracken – guitar
- Jack McGann – accordion, guitar
- Steve Mosley – drums, body percussion
- David Brigati – backing vocals
- Eddie Brigati – backing vocals
- Maria Muldaur – harmony vocals on "Don't Do Me Any Favors Anymore" and "Somebody Else's Troubles"
- David "Fathead" Newman – saxophone
- Jerry Barnham – flute
- Willie Bridges – saxophone
- Larry Packer – fiddle
- Kenny Kosek – fiddle
- Charles McCracken – cello

Production

- Arif Mardin – producer, remixing
- Malcolm Addey – engineer
- Joel Kerr – engineer
- Eddie Youngblood – engineer
- Harry Yarmark – engineer
- Michael O'Sullivan – photography
- Gib Foster – design
