= My Old Man (album) =

My Old Man: A Tribute to Steve Goodman

Compilation album by Various Artists
- Released: October 12, 2006
- Recorded: Oh Boy Records, Nashville, Tennessee
- Genre: Folk rock
- Length: 45:42
- Label: Red Pajamas Records
- Producer: Jason Mercer
- Compiler: Rosanna Goodman

My Old Man is a 2006 album compiled by Rosanna Goodman in tribute to her father, folk singer-songwriter Steve Goodman. The twelve tracks are all covers of songs written by Steve Goodman.

== Track listing ==
1. Ana Egge, "Old Fashioned"
2. Matt Keating and Emily Spray, "Danger"
3. Crescent and Frost, "If She Were You"
4. Chris Brown, "Yellow Coat"
5. Luther Wright and the Wrongs, "City of New Orleans"
6. Chris Brown and Kate Fenner, "The Ballad of Penny Evans"
7. Luther Wright and the Wrongs, "Jessie’s Jig"
8. Anna Hovhannessian, "A Lover Is Forever"
9. Rosanna Goodman, "My Old Man"
10. Tony Scherr, "Just Lucky I Guess"
11. Kate Fenner, "I Just Keep Falling In Love"
12. Teddy Kumpel, "Watching Joey Glow"
