= Go, Cubs, Go =

1984 single by Steve Goodman

"Go Cubs Go!"
- No Big Surprise (1994) was the first album to include the song.

Single by Steve Goodman

from the album The Steve Goodman Anthology: No Big Surprise
- Released: 1984
- Recorded: 1984
- Genre: Folk rock
- Length: 2:51 (Album version); 2:12 (Single without WGN version)
- Label: Red Pajamas
- Songwriter: Steve Goodman

"Go Cubs Go," "Go, Cubs, Go" or "Go, Cubs, Go!" is a song written by Steve Goodman in 1984. At various times the Goodman version of the song has been the official team song and victory song of the Chicago Cubs of Major League Baseball, playing after every home win for the Cubs at Wrigley Field. The Goodman version has been included in both a 1994 Steve Goodman anthology album and a 2008 Cubs songs and sounds album. Following the team's 2016 World Series victory, the song peaked at number 3 on Billboard's Bubbling Under Hot 100 Singles chart. An alternate 2008 version by Manic Sewing Circle has also been released.

== History ==
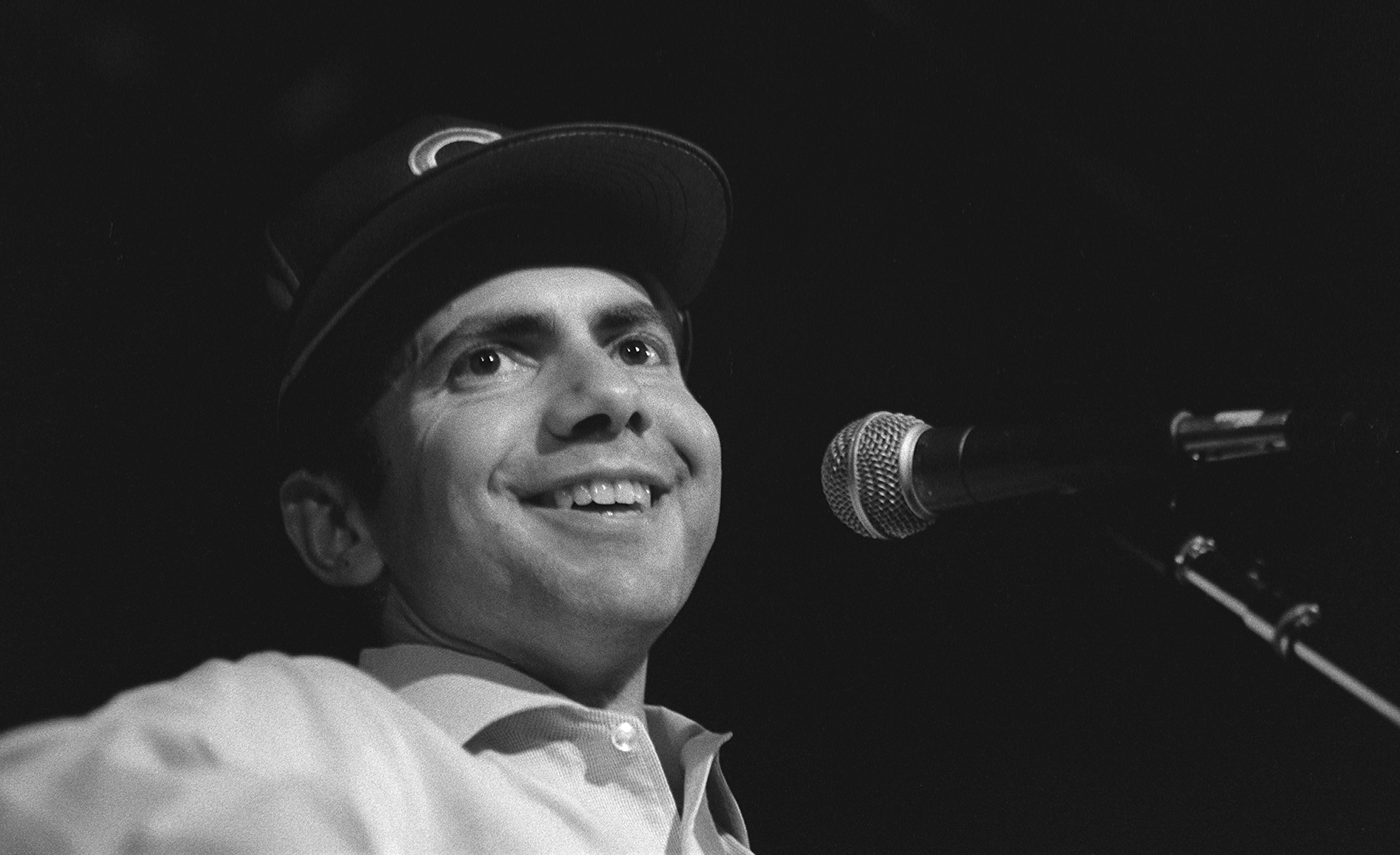
Steve Goodman (April 30, 1983)

"Go, Cubs, Go!"
- Manic Sewing Circle 2008 version cover art

Single by Manic Sewing Circle

from the album Go, Cubs, Go! (2008 version)
- Released: 2008
- Recorded: 2008
- Genre: Pop punk
- Length: 2:23
- Label: Oh Boy
- Songwriter: Steve Goodman

Goodman was a lifelong Cubs fan. The song was written by Goodman at the request of WGN/720, which was the Cubs' radio broadcast partner. In 1981 Goodman recorded "A Dying Cub Fan's Last Request," a song about the historic failures of the Cubs franchise, but had been banned from playing it at Wrigley Field. That song described the team as "doormat of the National League" and referred to Wrigley Field as an "ivy-covered burial ground."

At the time that WGN Program Director Dan Fabian requested the new song, "It's a Beautiful Day for a Ball Game" by The Harry Simeone Songsters was the theme song. He had been motivated by Cubs manager Dallas Green's effort to change the team spirit. Goodman happened to be in town for a WGN radio talk show and was receptive to the idea of writing the team a new song.

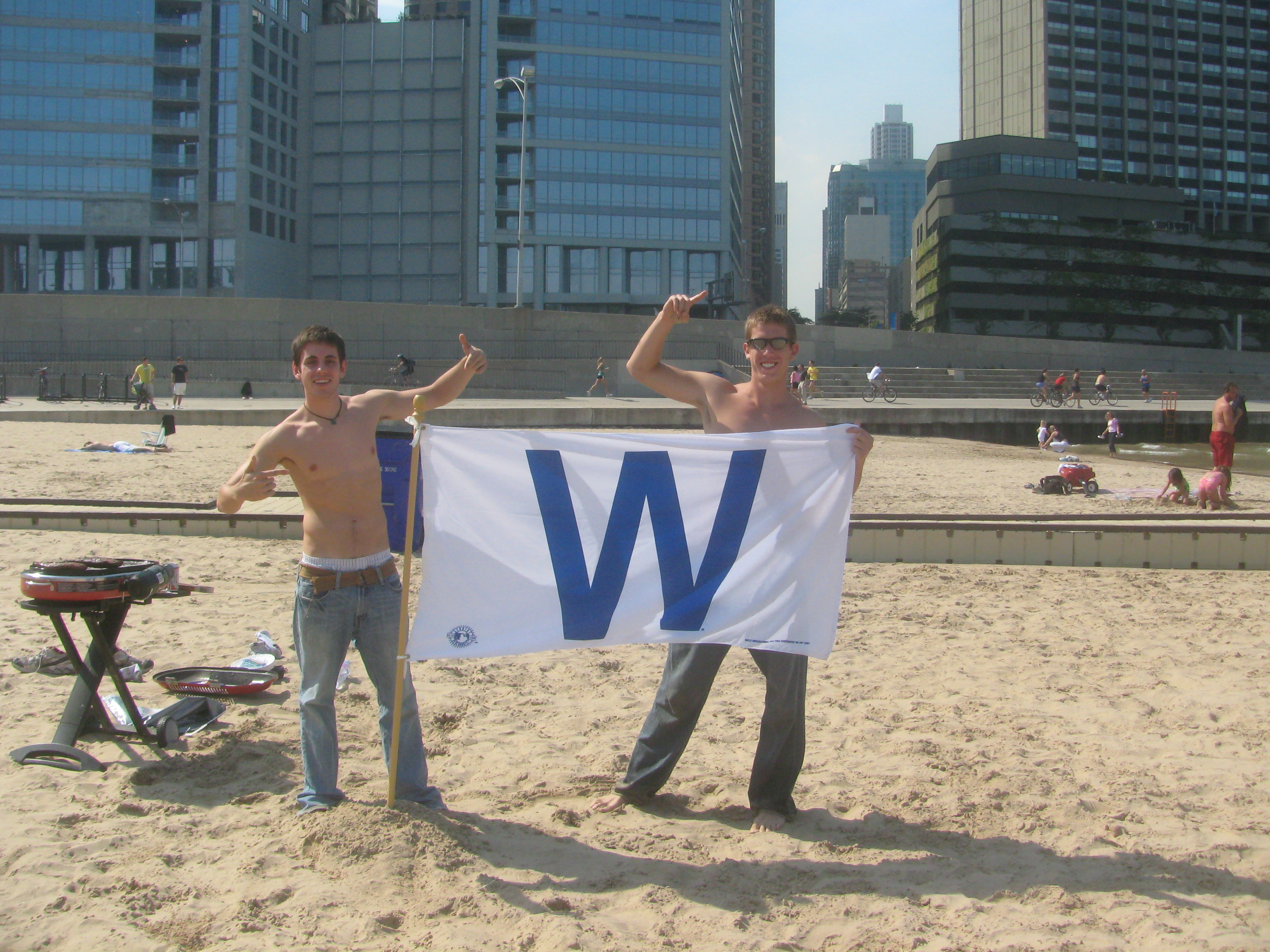
"Go, Cubs, Go" and the Cubs Win Flag symbolize Cubs' victories.

"Go, Cubs, Go," recorded at the Chicago Recording Company with several of the team members participating in the chorus, first became popular during 1984 when the Cubs won the 1984 National League East Division Championship and subsequently lost in the 1984 National League Championship Series. That season (and for several afterwards) it was the official team song. It was first aired on WGN on Opening Day and played every gameday for the rest of the season. During that season, Goodman died from leukemia four days before the Cubs clinched the division title. In the next three years, 60,000 copies of the song were sold with proceeds going to charity. Some 1984 Cubs players can be heard performing the refrain.

In 1987, the song gave way to The Beach Boys' "Here Come the Cubs." Later team songs included songs such as Kool & the Gang's "Celebration" and KC and the Sunshine Band's "Get Down Tonight." The song was eventually included on Goodman's album No Big Surprise: Anthology, which was released on September 15, 1994.

== Modern resurgence ==
The song has had a resurgence in tandem with the success of the 2007 and 2008 Chicago Cubs, who won consecutive National League Central Division regular season championships, and the May 2007 release of the biography of Steve Goodman, Steve Goodman: Facing the Music (ISBN 1-55022-732-7). In recent years, broadcasts on WGN-TV and NBC Sports Chicago have begun delaying postgame commentary to enable viewers to hear Goodman's song and to watch fans at Wrigley listening and singing along. Cubs management decided to incorporate the song into the stadium experience following the team's annual winter conference (not to be confused with baseball's winter meetings) in which attendees dropped everything they were doing to sing along.

More recently, in the 2012 season, Chicago band The Fold used the lyric "Go Cubs Go" in their winning track for WGN Radio's 2012 Season, "Let's Go Cubbies".

In the first week of October 2007, it was the most popular folk music digital download on iTunes. With the Cubs in playoff contention for the first time in four years, the Cubs' victory tune, Go Cubs Go! became more popular among the fans. Due to the song's growing popularity, after wins at home, Cubs TV broadcasters Len Kasper and Bob Brenly would have their microphones shut off, while the camera pans around the stadium to view the jubilant fans singing with "Go Cubs Go!" playing in the background. During that season, it was known as the unofficial Chicago Cubs victory song and it was played at Wrigley Field after each Cubs victory. There were 44 such victories during the 2007 regular season. On October 5, 2007, Illinois Lieutenant Governor Pat Quinn declared the day "Steve Goodman Day" throughout the state.

The song was included in a 2008 MLB-licensed Cubs songs and sounds album celebrating the 100th anniversary of the Cubs' 1908 World Series victory.

On August 1, 2008, WGN Radio and Vibes Media released a ringtone version of the song for purchase by text message for a cost of US$2.99. At that time it was described as the official Cubs victory song. Also in 2008, the song was included on the album Take Me Out To A Cubs Game which was subtitled "Music For The Cubs Fan". The album is a 17-song album with a total run time of 55 minutes and 35 seconds that includes the September 21, 1997 Harry Caray performance of "Take Me Out to the Ball Game", which was his last. The album was produced in celebration of the 100th anniversary of the Cubs 1908 World Series victory and contains sounds and songs of the Cubs and Wrigley Field. The album is an officially licensed Major League Baseball music CD. Neither of Goodman's other notable songs about the Cubs ("A Dying Cub Fan's Last Request" or "When the Cubs Go Marching In") was included on the album.

Also in 2008, the song was released by Manic Sewing Circle. It was performed for the first time live on WGN-TV at the Skybox on Sheffield, located directly across from Wrigley Field on opening day 2008. Their cover version of the song was released with proceeds going to official charities of the Chicago Cubs and WGN radio: Cubs Care and Neediest Kids Fund. The Manic Sewing Circle version of the song is also available on iTunes by digital download, and they publicized this version throughout Chicago. Although the original Goodman version of the song is 2:51, the new Manic Sewing Circle version is only 2:23 long.

In September 2008, prompted by the Cubs' 2008 season and a piece by Mike Leonard on the NBC Today Show about Steve Goodman, Red Pajamas Records issued a 4-cut EP titled The Baseball Singles with Goodman's performances of "Go Cubs Go", "A Dying Cub Fan's Last Request", "When The Cubs Go Marching In", and "Take Me Out to the Ball Game".

The song surged in sales on U.S. digital download services, including the top five on Amazon Music and the top 15 on iTunes, following the team's 2016 World Series victory. "Go, Cubs, Go" debuted at number 22 on Spotify's Viral 50 and debuted at number 3 on Billboard's Bubbling Under Hot 100 Singles chart. The cast of the musical Hamilton in Chicago sang a rendition of the song on November 3, 2016. During the team's victory rally at Grant Park on November 4, 2016, country singer Brett Eldredge sang his own rendition of the song. The following day, Cubs players Anthony Rizzo, Dexter Fowler, and David Ross appeared on Saturday Night Live to perform the song during the show's weekly Weekend Update segment, together with actor Bill Murray, an avid Cubs supporter.

Several of the Cubs' minor league affiliates also use the song, including the Tennessee Smokies and the Myrtle Beach Pelicans. The Daytona Cubs also used the song before changing affiliations, replacing the word "Chicago" in the chorus with "Daytona."

On the premiere of Dancing with the Stars's 24th season, former Cubs catcher David Ross and his partner Lindsay Arnold danced to a shortened version of the song.

== Thematic issues ==
The song is perceived as an upbeat one that leaves listeners with a happy feeling. It is described as having catchy riffs and exuberant vocals that characterized the essence of Cubs fandom while, noting in the lyrics, "You can catch it all on WGN." That particular lyric is now partially out of date, as WGN radio, which had carried Cubs games in some form or another since 1925, gave up the radio rights to the Cubs in 2015 to CBS Radio, which was followed by the Cubs taking their TV rights from WGN-TV to an in-house channel with the launch of Marquee Sports Network in 2020. The new Manic Sewing Circle cover is a ska-punk version instead of the original folk music.

== Charts ==
Chart (2016)	Peak position
US Bubbling Under Hot 100 (Billboard)	3
US Digital Songs (Billboard)	49
