= Cubs Win Flag =

Victory flag that is flown at Wrigley Field

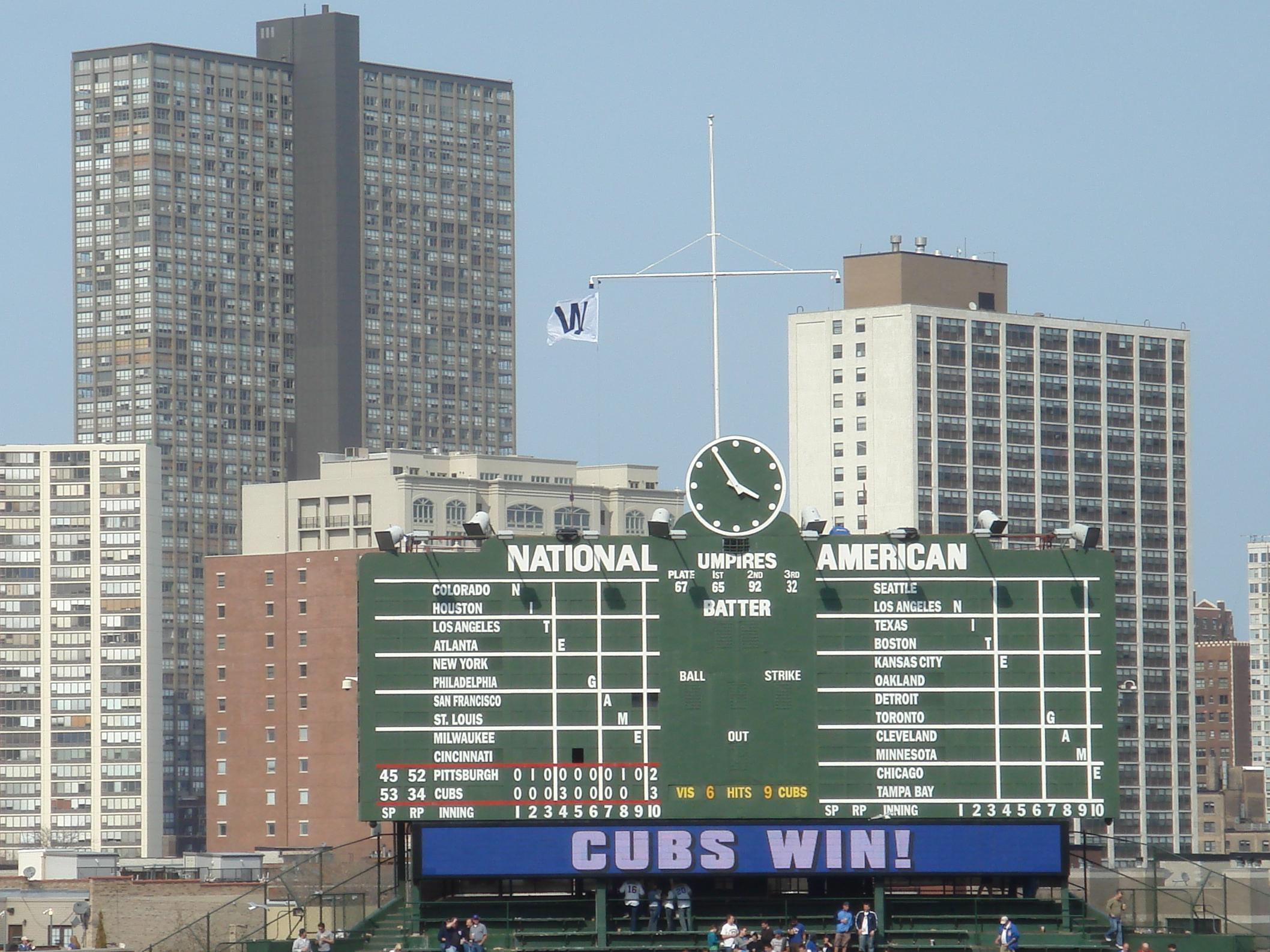
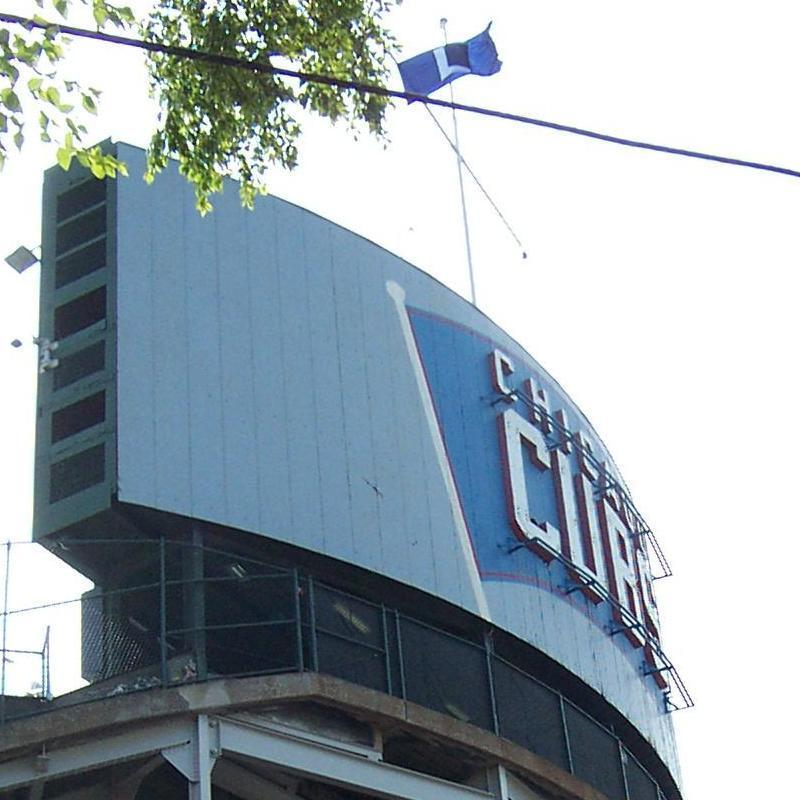
The Win Flag (left) or Loss Flag (right) indicates home game outcome.
Cubs Win Flag (left) and Cubs Lose Flag (right)

The Cubs Win Flag is a victory flag that is flown at Wrigley Field after every home win by the Chicago Cubs of Major League Baseball. The flag is variously referred to by approximately a dozen names, combining: either Cubs or Chicago Cubs; Win, W, White, White W, or W Win; and flag, banner or banner flag. Other common names for the symbol include Chicago Cubs W Flag and Chicago Cubs Win Banner Flag. It has become an important symbol for fans, and tradition of flying a win or loss flag over the stadium began soon after the construction of the scoreboard in 1937.

The flag has used two different color schemes with the letter "W" on a solid background, and there is a loss indicator flag with a letter "L". Additionally, the flags have been complemented by different color schemes of indicator lights. The flag is also changed after each Cubs win. The flag has become a very symbolic emblem for devout Cubs fans. Some retailers sell slightly different versions that also have the Cubs logo at the bottom.

== Detail ==
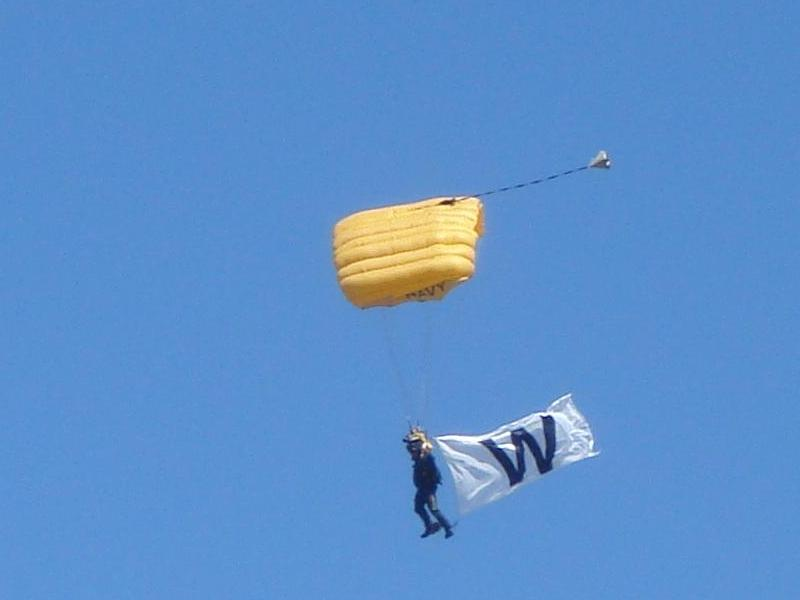
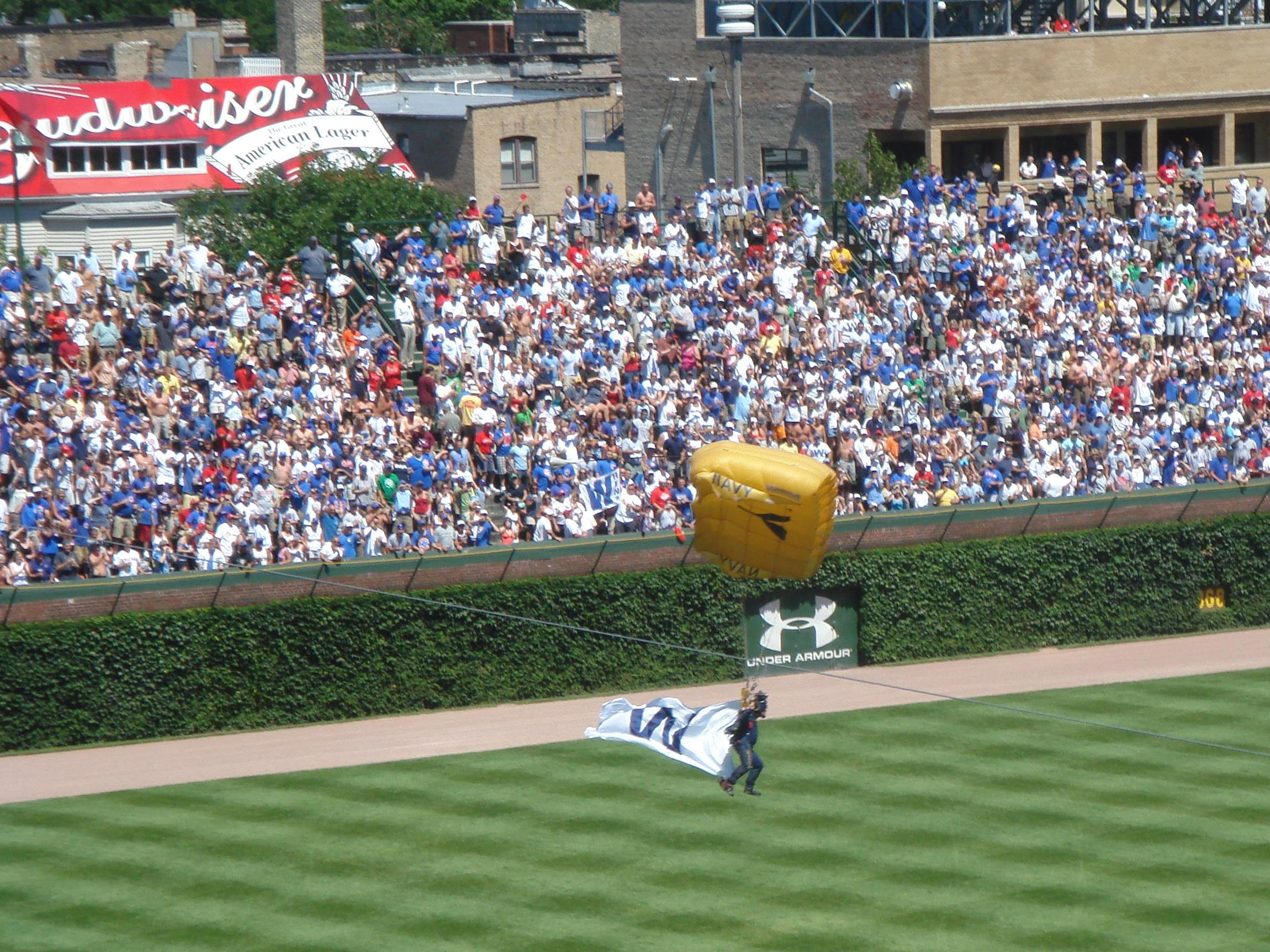
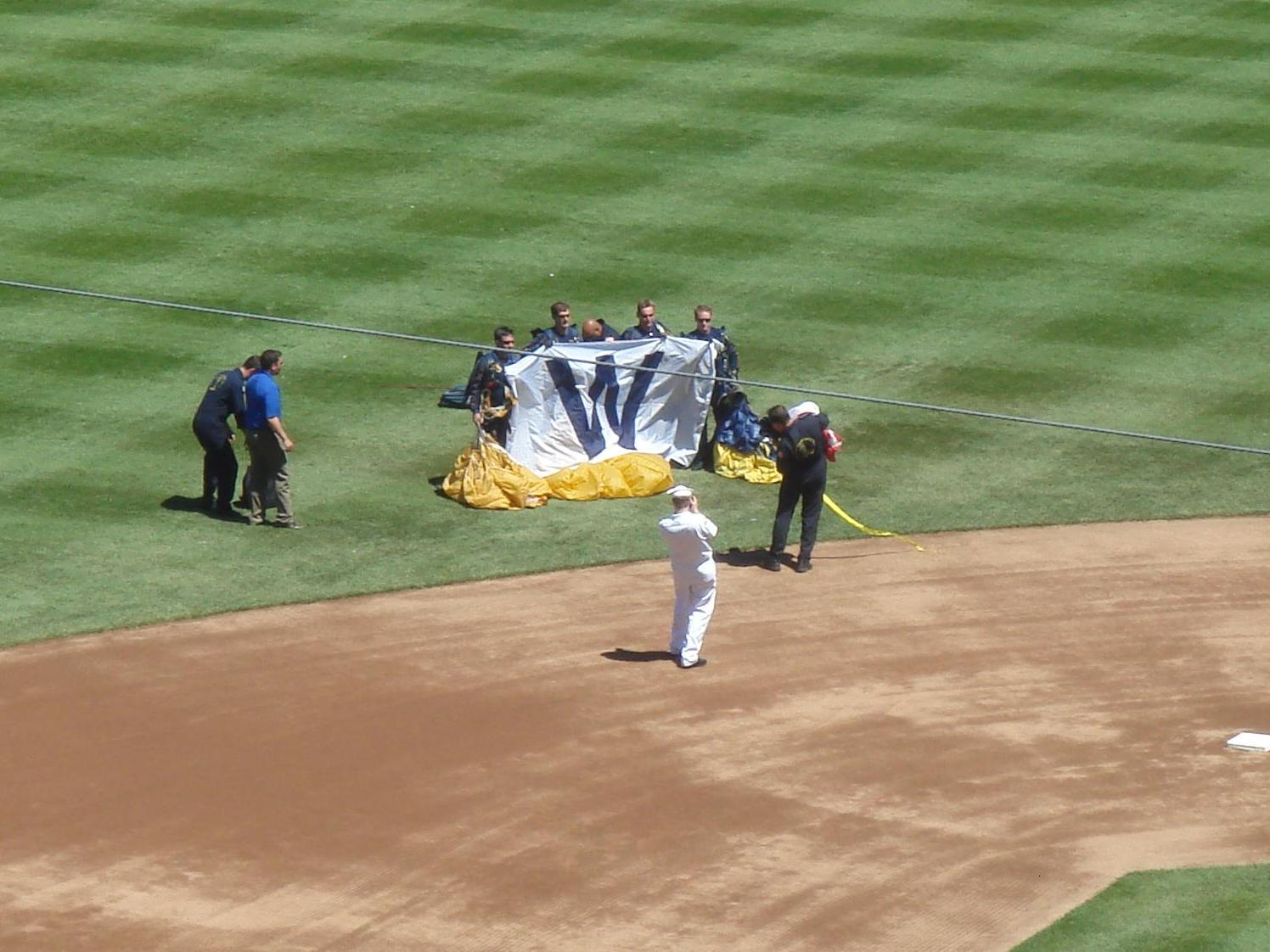
Navy SEAL parachutes onto Wrigley Field with a Win Flag (2008-08-08)

Flying a flag over Wrigley Field to denote wins and losses is a longstanding tradition. Currently, the Win Flag is composed of a large blue letter "W" on a white background while the Loss Flag is a large white letter "L" on a blue background. Early in the 21st century, the phrase "White flag time at Wrigley!" was used to explain that the Cubs had just won that day's home game. More recently, at least as early as the 2015 season, the Cubs have used the phrase "Fly the W!"; an accompanying social media hashtag "#FlyTheW" has been heavily promoted by the team and its fans. The flag is raised by a scoreboard crew member immediately after the completion of a game, and in the case of a doubleheader split, both flags are flown.

It is customary to fly flags from sunrise until sunset, unless they are directly illuminated. At the beginning of each day, the cross-shaped "masthead" atop the center field scoreboard displays the American flag at the top, and three strands of flags bearing the colors and logos of each of the National League teams, one strand per Division in order of that day's standings. Immediately after the game, one of the strands of flags is lowered, and either the W or the L-lettered flag is raised in its place. The W-lettered flag is raised on the left field side of the board, above the blue light that also indicates a win. The L-lettered flag is raised on the right field side of the board, above the white light that indicates a loss. Once the Win or Loss Flag has been raised, the other flags are lowered and also stowed away inside the scoreboard.

Chicago Cubs Fans celebrate with the Cubs Win flag

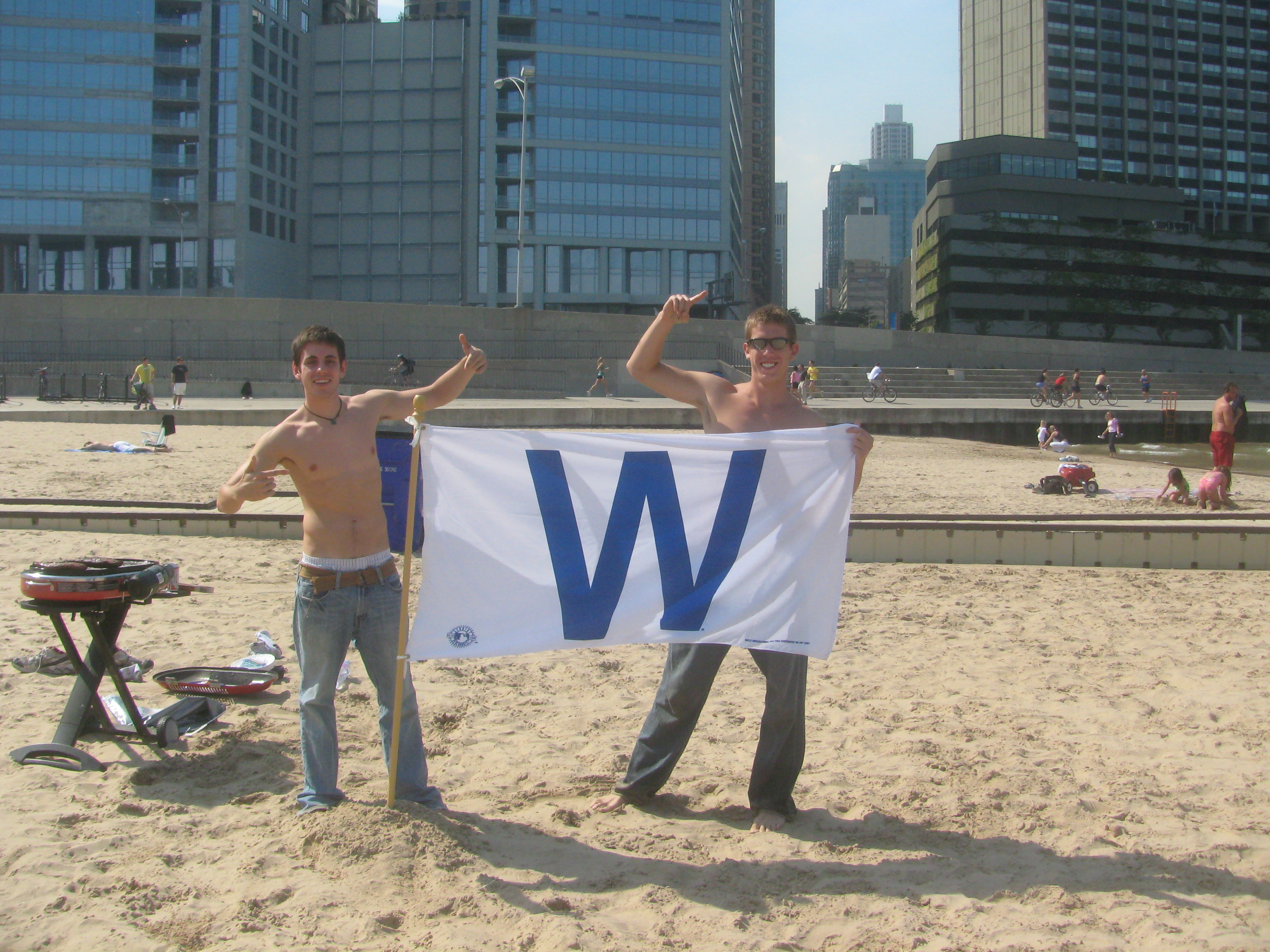
2008 Cubs Fans while the magic number is 1. (2008-09-20)

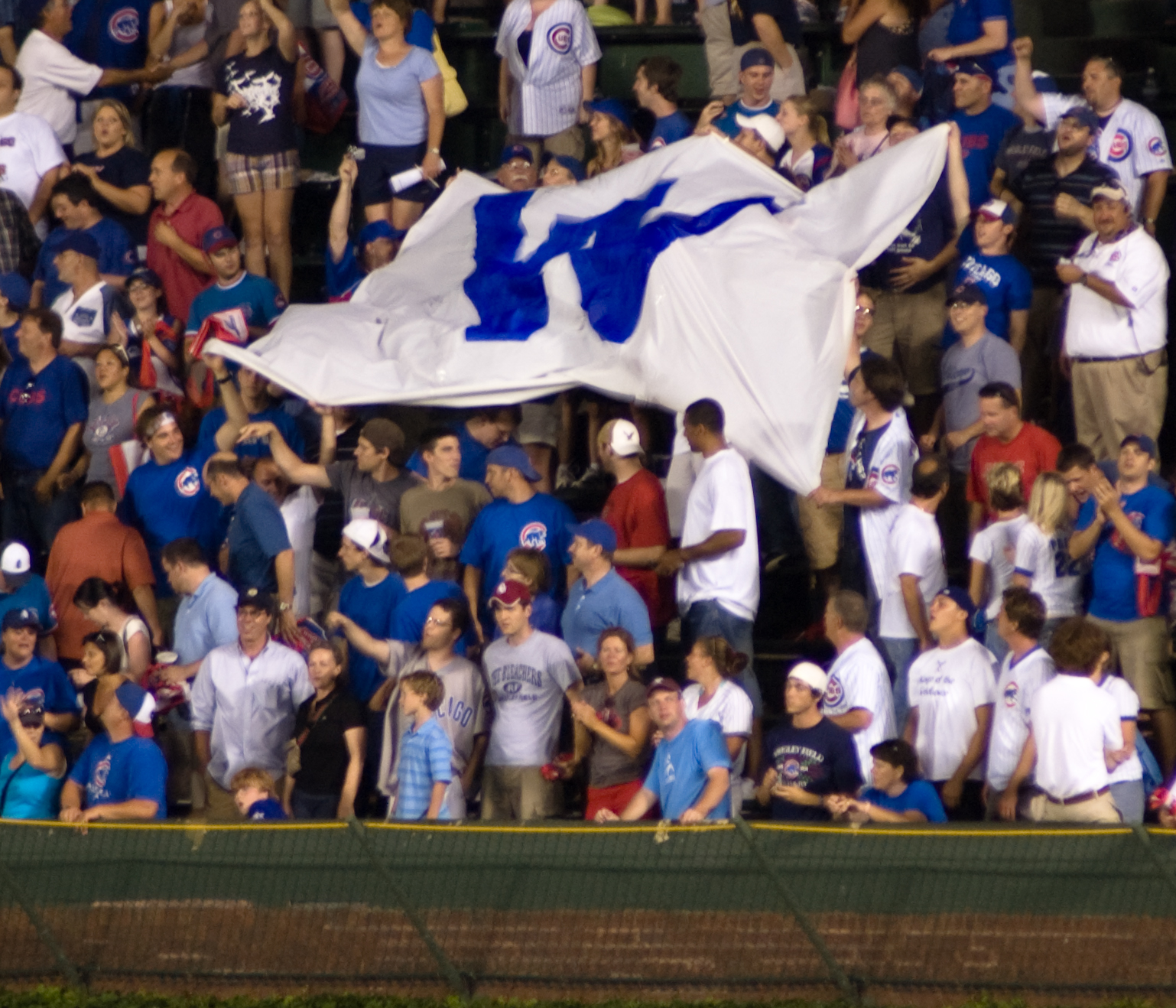
Fans at Wrigley Field victory with oversized flag (2008-07-08)

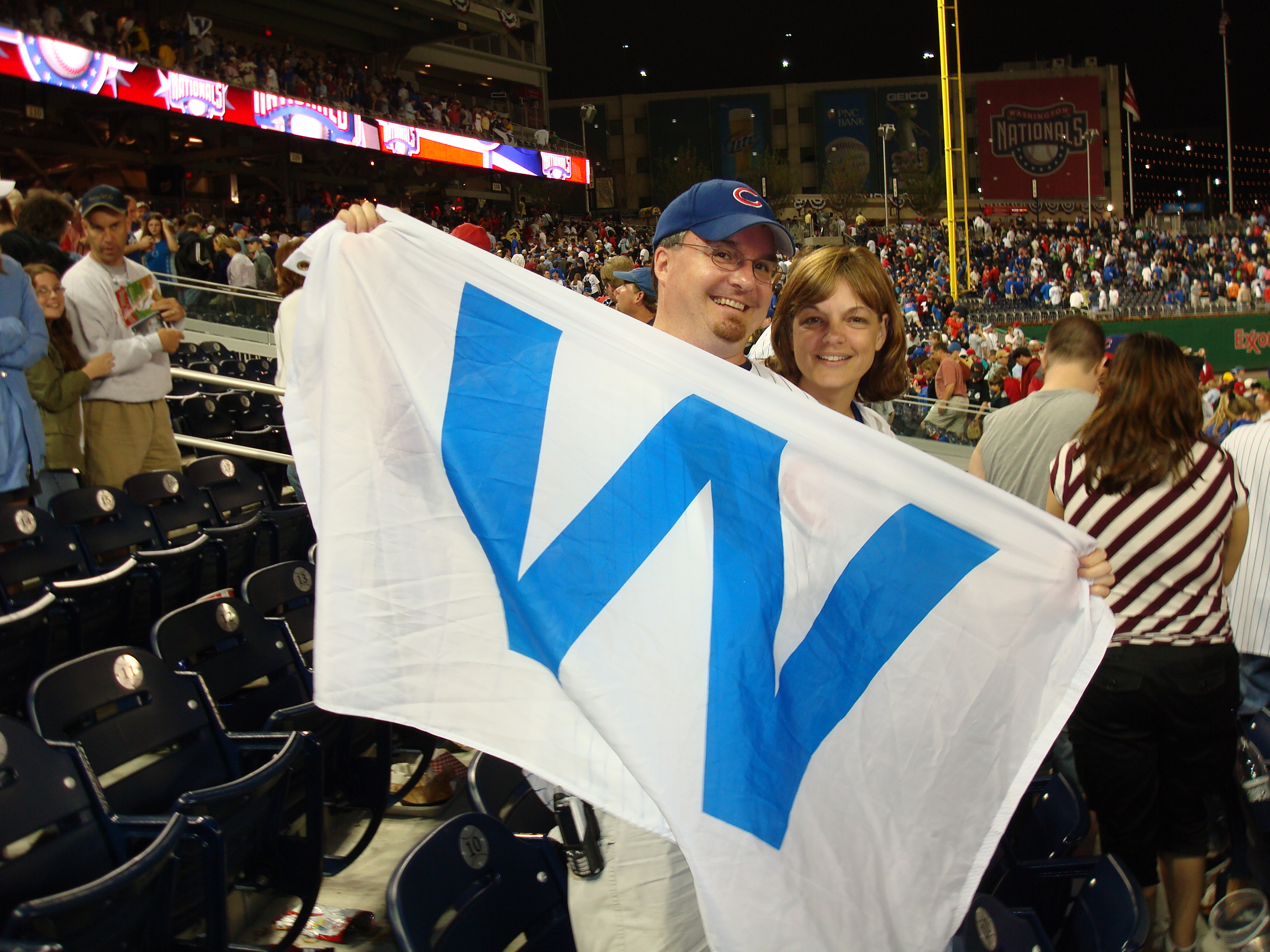
Fans at Chicago Cubs' first win at Nationals Park (2008-04-26)

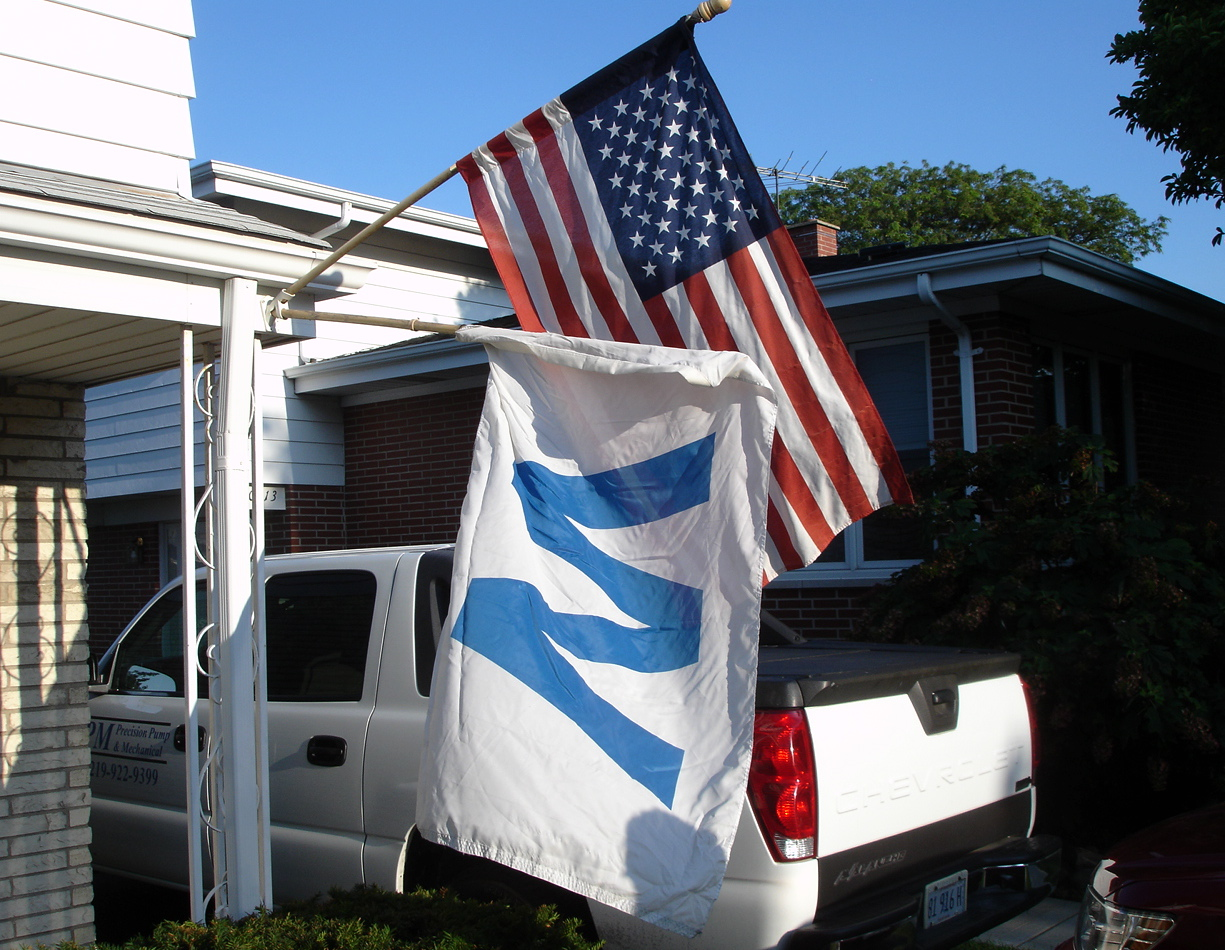
Home display along with Flag of the United States (2008-08-24)

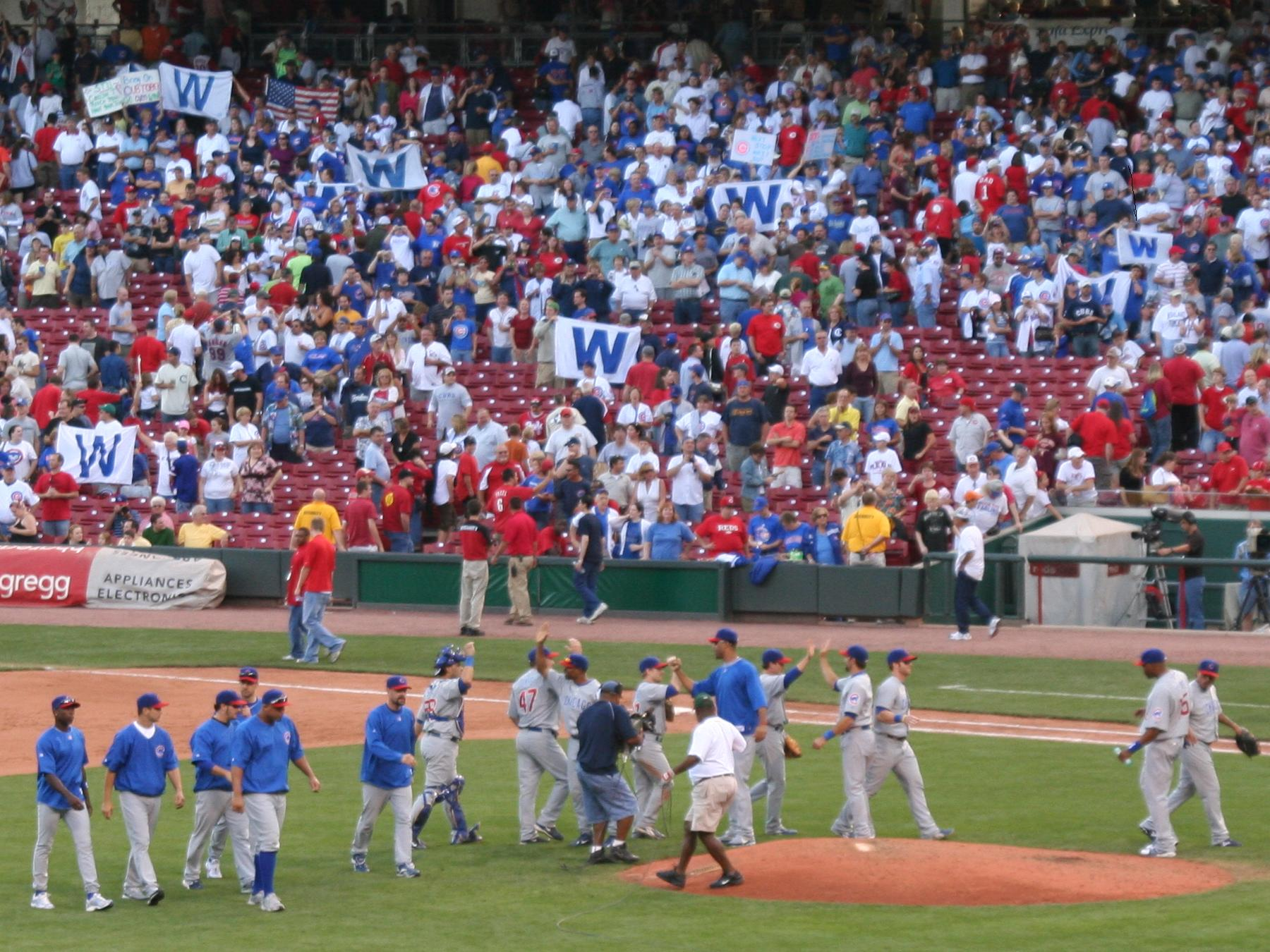
2007 Cubs and fans celebrate NL Central championship (2007-09-28)

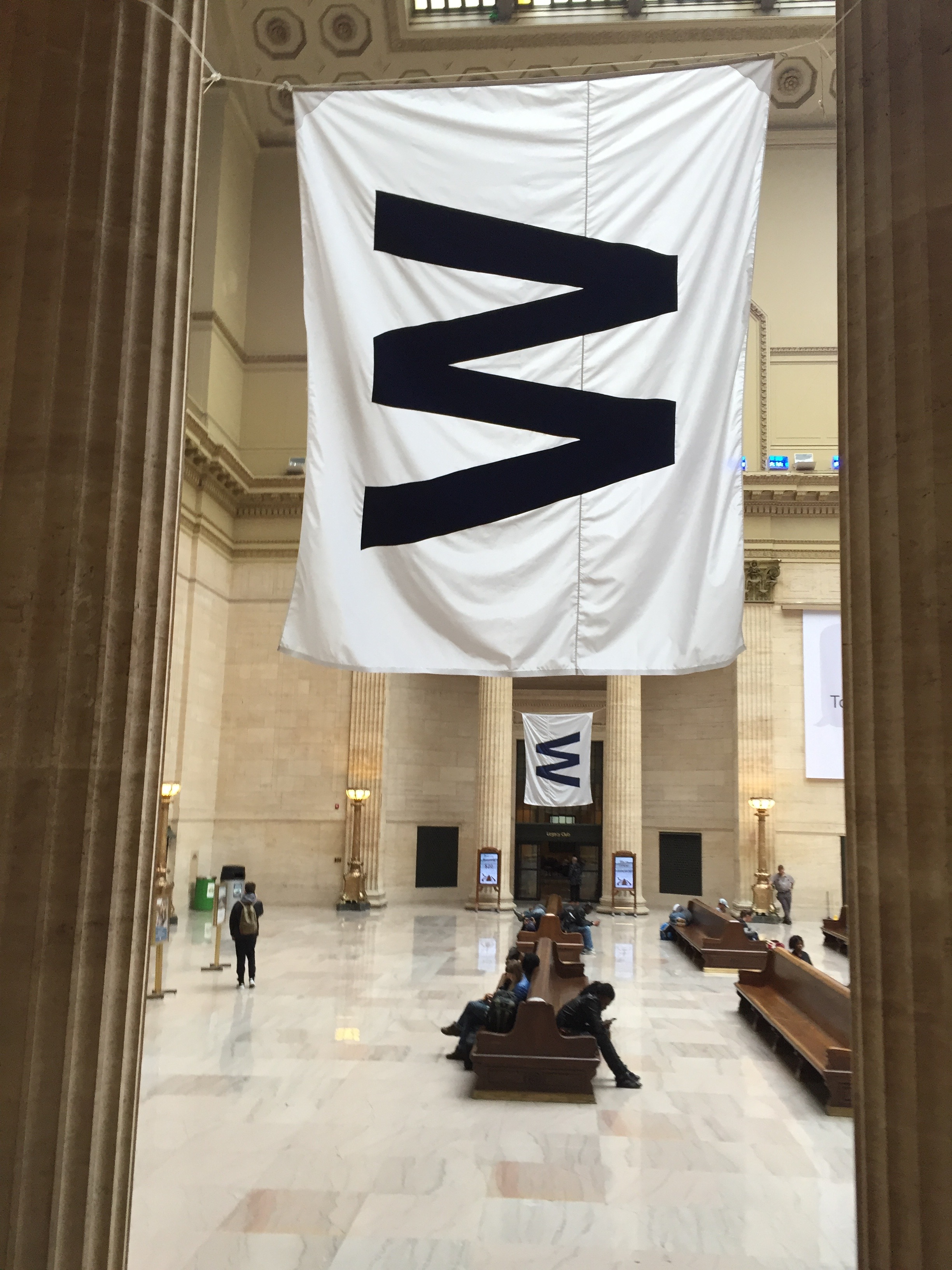
Large flags hanging in the Great Hall of the Chicago Union Station during the 2016 World Series

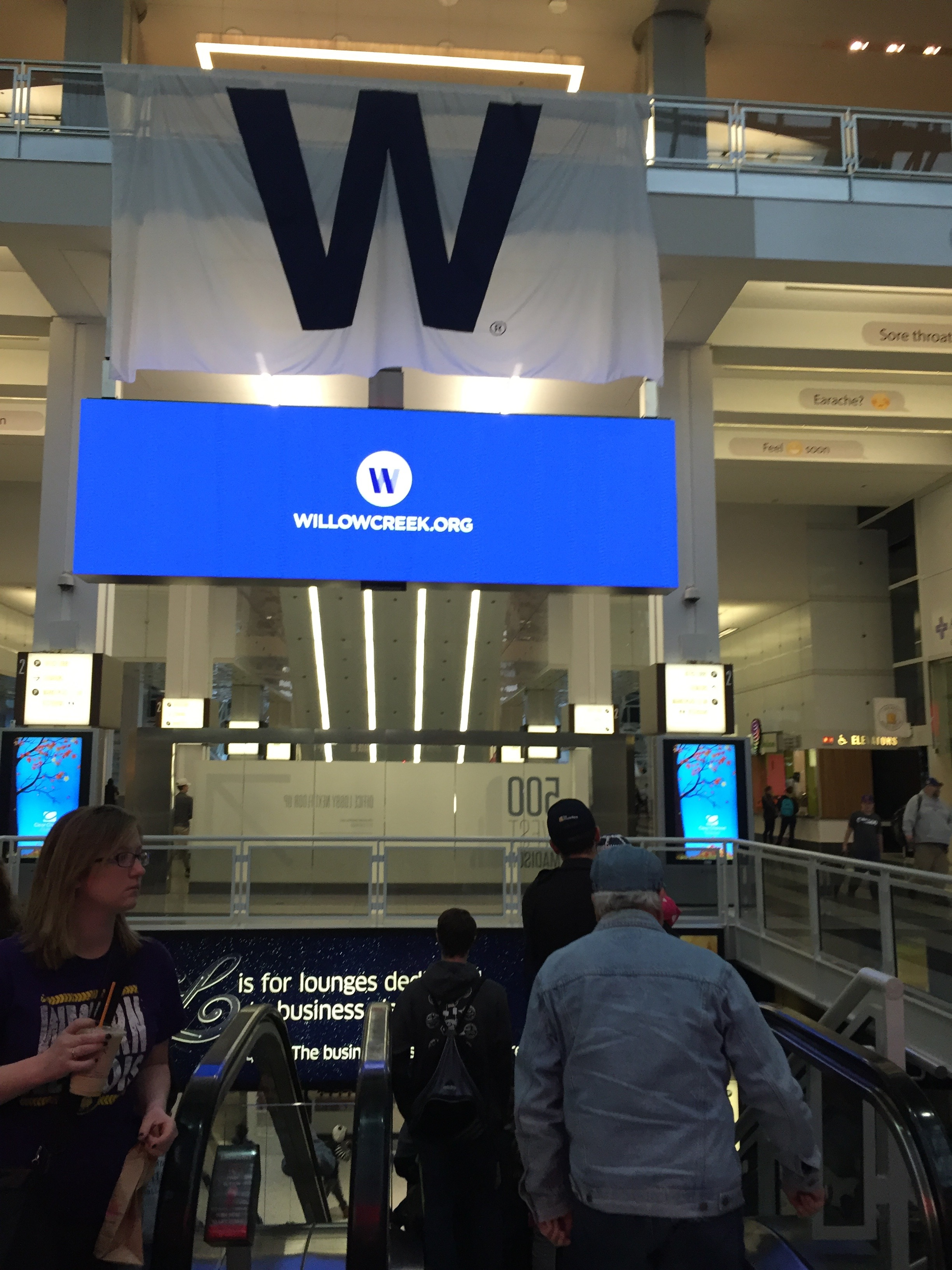
Large flag in the foyer of 500 West Madison (home to the Ogilvie Transportation Center) during the 2016 World Series

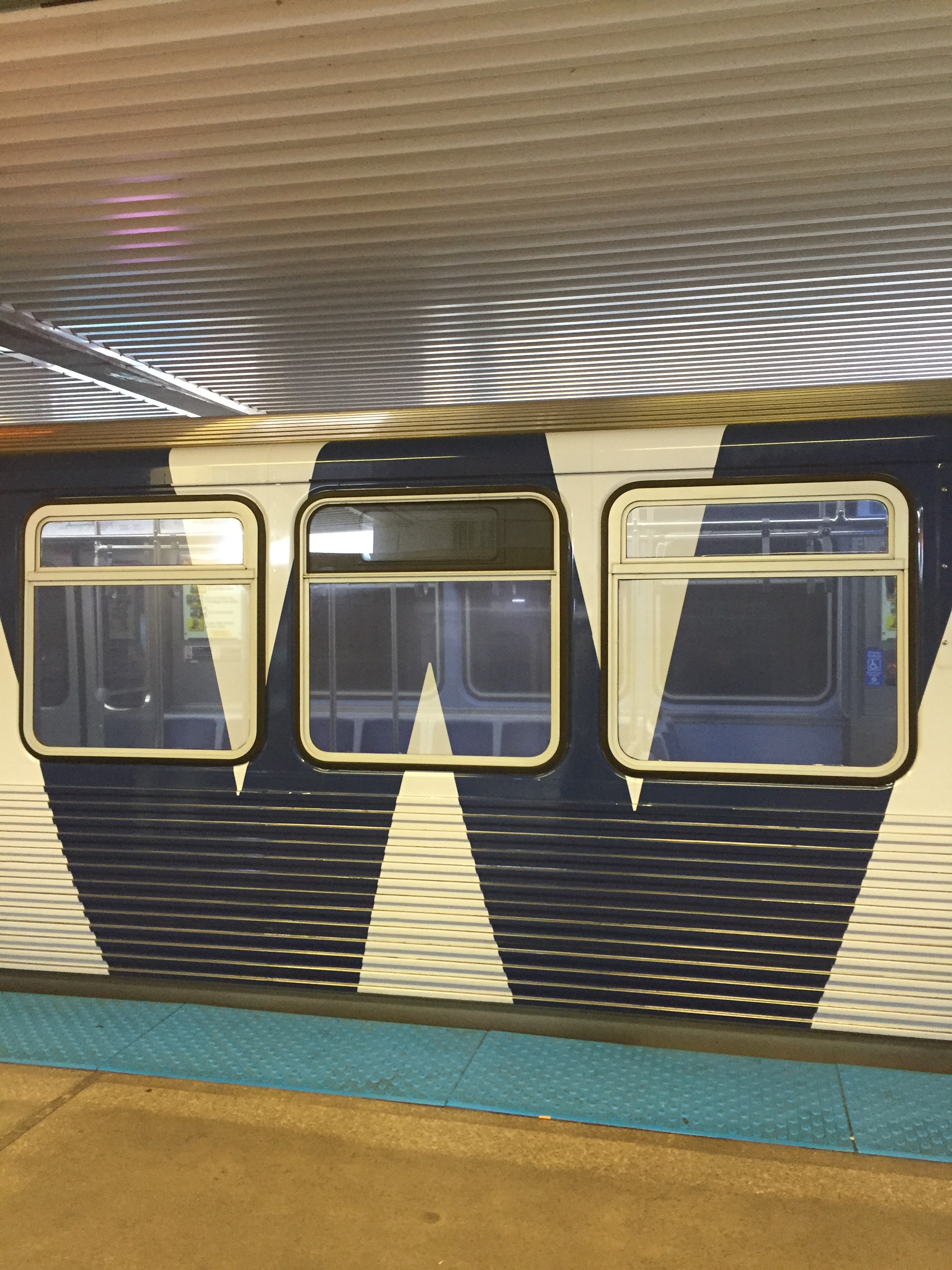
"L" train of the CTA with a flag-inspired livery to celebrate the Cubs 2016 World Series victory

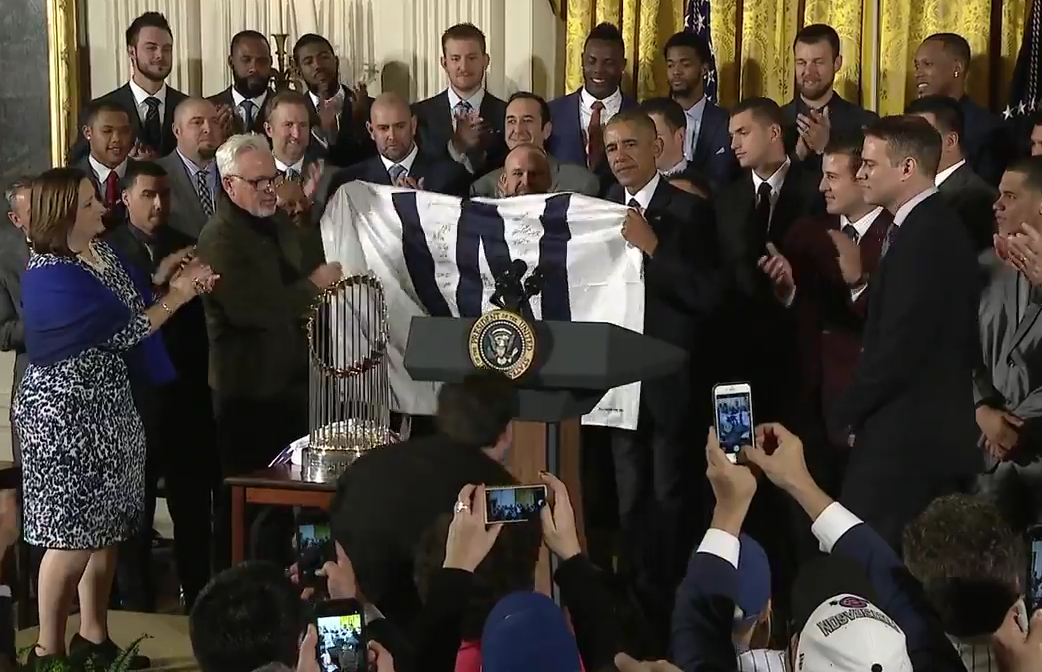
Cubs present President Barack Obama with an autographed flag during their visit to the White House to celebrate their 2016 World Series victory

The symbolism of the flag now serves a wide variety of purposes. It is commonly reproduced in 3-by-5-foot (0.91 by 1.52 m) dimensions, and car flag versions are also sold. The flag is also available in 2-by-3-foot (0.61 by 0.91 m) dimension versions. The flag has become a celebratory symbol for Chicago Cubs fans who purchase reproductions and take them to games at home and on the road to show support. The fans wave them after victories at Wrigley Field, and they hang them in the stands during playoff series. Some fans fly a win flag in place of or in addition to the Flag of the United States on days when the Cubs win. Since 1998, the flags have become ever more popular, with demand reaching a level where they are sold at Wrigley Field. In 2007, with the Cubs in playoff contention for the first time in 3 years, the Cubs' victory tune, Go Cubs Go! became more popular among the fans. Due to the song's growing popularity, after wins at home, Cubs TV broadcasters Len Kasper and Bob Brenly would have their microphones shut off, while the camera pans around the stadium to view the jubilant fans as Go Cubs Go! plays in the background. After fans discovered this, they started purchasing "W" flags and waving them after wins at home as an attempt to get on TV. However, in seasons when the Cubs are performing poorly the tradition has led to parody and satire, such as stories of the Cubs retiring the win flag due to signs of neglect.

While not having the popularity of the Win Flag, the Loss Flag has become increasingly popular with clubs who traditionally have rivalries with the Cubs, such as the St. Louis Cardinals, Milwaukee Brewers, or Chicago White Sox. Fans of those teams wave the blue flag after their team defeats the Cubs at Busch Stadium or Rate Field. However, because of the enormous fan base that the Cubs hold, it is not uncommon to see fans at games on the road waving their "W" flags during Cubs wins on the road. Another of the Cubs' rivals, the Pittsburgh Pirates, actually co-opted the Cubs Win Flag for themselves by waving a Jolly Roger pirate flag after each Pirates win.

The flag is known by many names, with none being more prevalent than the rest, and may often be referred to by more than one name by the same manufacturer. "Chicago Cubs W Win Flag" is the name used on Amazon.com, however the company also refers to the flag as Chicago Cubs 'W' Banner Flag in their marketplace section. CubWorld.com also refers to the flag by the name Chicago Cubs 'W' Banner Flag. Other retailers use the names Cubs Win W Flag, Chicago Cubs Win 3' x 5' Flag, Cubs W Flag, or (Chicago Cubs) W Flag in the case of Sports Fan Warehouse. One retailer even sells an item called the Chicago Cubs W Fan Banner. Another retailer sells two versions of the flag listed as Chicago Cubs Win W Flag and Chicago Cubs Win Flag, yet its advertisements mentions celebrating a Cub win with the Chicago Cubs White "W" Flag. An alternate version that has the Chicago Cubs logo beneath the W can be found under the name Chicago Cubs Win W Banner.

== History ==
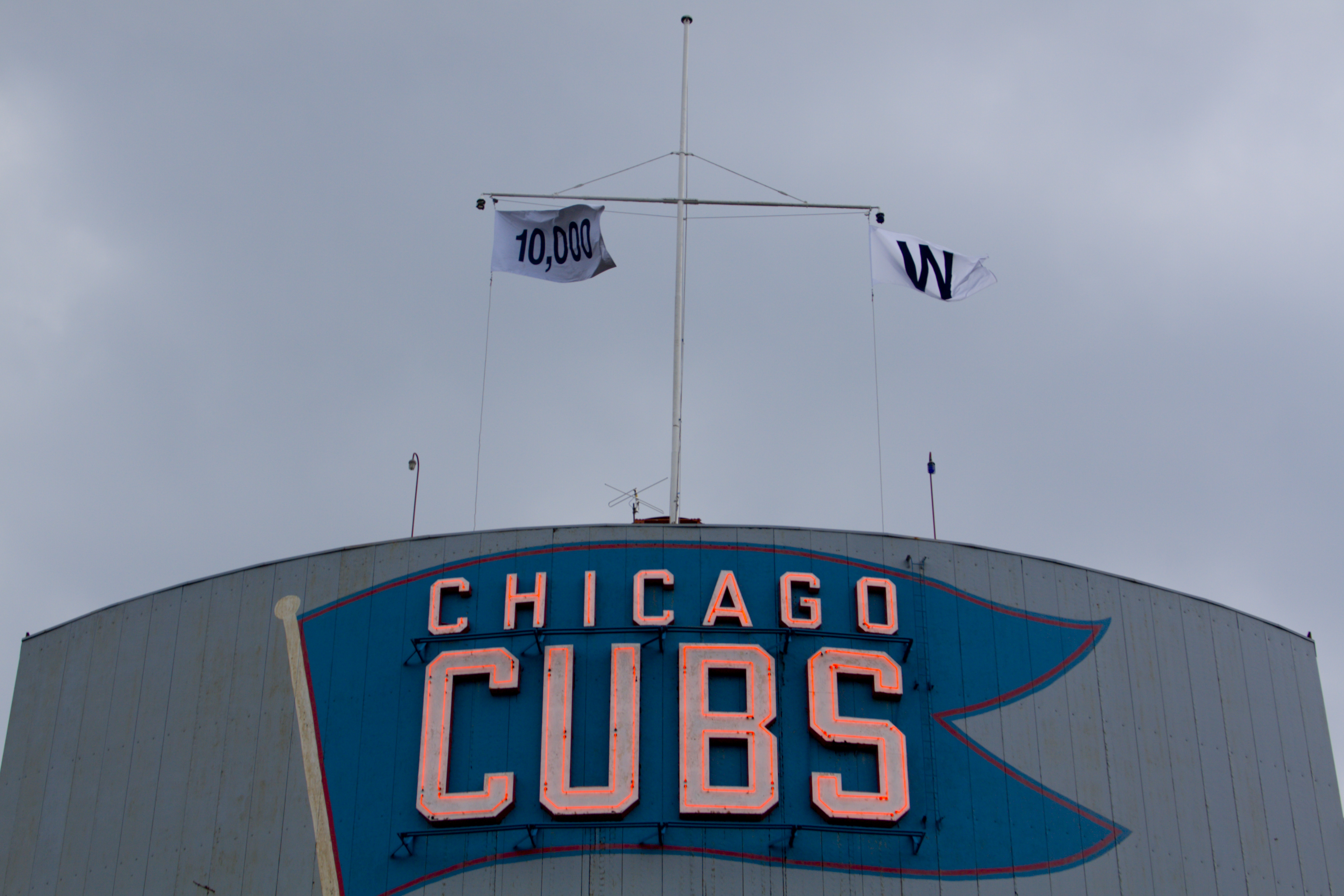
View outside Wrigley Field

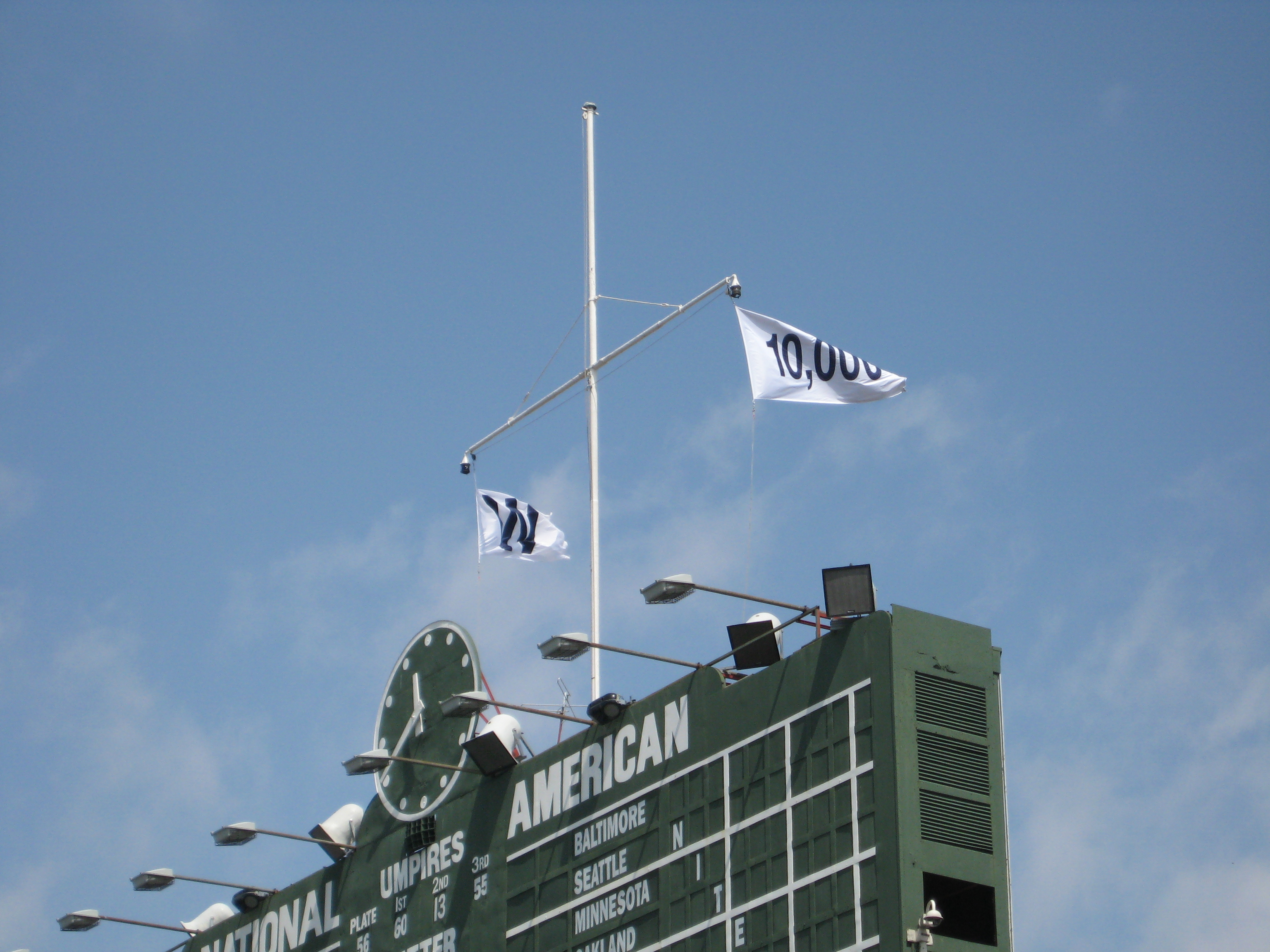
View inside Wrigley Field

A special flag flying session occurred from April 24–29, 2008, when the Cubs franchise won their 10,000th game on April 23, 2008.

The Cubs' then-owner Philip K. Wrigley ordered the reconstruction of the bleachers and the building of the manually operated scoreboard in 1937. The scoreboard's "masthead" was in place by 1938, displaying the American flag at the top and flags representing the eight clubs of the National League on the left and right strands of the masthead, four apiece. In the 1940s, the practice of raising the Win/Loss flags was begun.

The flags were originally a white "W" on a blue flag and a blue "L" on a white flag. This matched what was then the color scheme of the Cubs "team flags" that flew on the foul poles, and the many little "W.F." flags that flew on the grandstand roof (all of them serving to give the players a sense of the wind speed and direction). Ernie Banks was the first Cub to have his number retired on August 22, 1982, and his number 14 has been flown in blue on a white flag (echoing the pattern of a Cubs home uniform shirt) on the left field foul pole ever since. On August 13, 1987, Billy Williams had his number retired and it flew with the same color scheme, on the right field foul pole. The scheme of the Cubs Win flag was reversed in the early 1980s. The change in the flag color scheme matched the Win flag color with the honored colors of the retired number flags, as the white-on-blue Cubs "team flag" was retired. Subsequent retired Cubs numbers for Ron Santo, Ryne Sandberg and Ferguson Jenkins/Greg Maddux also match this color scheme.

In addition to the flags, Wrigley authorized Bill Veeck, the leader of the bleacher reconstruction project, to add colored lights on the crossbar of the masthead so that the Chicago 'L' passengers would be able to see the outcome of Cubs home games after sunset. In his autobiography, Veeck remembered the colors as green for a win and red for a loss. Hartell's book acknowledges Veeck's comments, but reports that contemporary newspapers stated that the colors of the lights were blue and white, as they are now. Eventually the original lights on the masthead were replaced by lights directly on the top of scoreboard, still visible from outside Wrigley field. The lights complement the flags by helping night time passersby learn the result of that day's Cubs game at a glance. The current blue and white Win/Loss lights were added atop the scoreboard in 1978. The Cubs added a video replay board in left field, topped with the logo of Chicago-area bank Wintrust. The "W" in Wintrust flashes after every win.

W flag used by Chicago Cubs after winning the 2016 National League Championship Series. Video from Voice of America.

On April 23, 2008, the Cubs won for the 10,000th time in the history of the franchise on the road against the Colorado Rockies. Like the 9,000th win, the 10,000th win came in a 7–6 victory at Coors Field. The Cubs were the second franchise to achieve 10,000 regular season wins; the San Francisco Giants/New York Giants were the first. The franchise flew a special 10,000th win flag along with a Cubs Win flag to commemorate the landmark achievement for the franchise. This was unusual not just for the 10,000th win, but also for flying the flag in reference to a road game. The special flag flew from the afternoon of April 24, 2008, until immediately prior to the next home game on April 29, 2008, at 7:05pm against the Milwaukee Brewers. After the flag was taken down, it was autographed by all members of the 2008 Chicago Cubs and auctioned off for charity.

== Sources ==
- Shea, Stuart (2006). Wrigley Field: The Unauthorized Biography. Potomac Books Inc. ISBN 1-57488-941-9.
- Snyder, John (2005). Cubs Journal. Emmis Books. ISBN 1-57860-192-4.
