= Steve Goodman (album) =

Studio album by Steve Goodman
- Released: November 1971
- Studios: Quadrafonic, Nashville, TN
- Genre: Folk
- Length: 46:40 (reissue)
- Label: Buddah
- Producers: Norbert Putnam, Kris Kristofferson

Steve Goodman chronology
| Steve Goodman (1971) | Somebody Else's Troubles (1972) |

Steve Goodman is the self-titled debut album of singer/songwriter Steve Goodman, released in 1971. It included both of his most well-known compositions: "City of New Orleans", first covered by Arlo Guthrie, and an early version of "You Never Even Call Me by My Name," which, with some modifications, was covered by David Allan Coe. In 1990 Sequel Records issued the album on CD.

The album was reissued on CD in 1999 and included two bonus tracks, "Election Year Rag" and "Georgia Rag". The album was a critical success, although a commercial failure.

== Reception ==
Professional ratings
Review scores
| Source | Rating |
|---|---|
| AllMusic | 5/5 stars |
| Q | 3/5 stars |

In reviewing the 1999 reissue, AllMusic critic William Ruhlmann called "City of New Orleans" the "obvious standout" and wrote, "At a time when sensitive singer/songwriters were all the rage (a trend that probably earned Goodman his record contract), this was one guy who was at least as interested in picking an old country song as he was in baring his soul." John Bauldie in Q described the album as "essentially a recording of the best of his folk club repertoire".

== Track listing ==
All tracks written by Steve Goodman, except where noted.

1. "The I Don't Know Where I'm Going, But I'm Goin' Nowhere in a Hurry Blues" – 2:32
2. "Rainbow Road" (Donnie Fritts, Dan Penn) – 3:33
3. "Donald & Lydia" (John Prine) – 4:54
4. "You Never Even Call Me by My Name" (Steve Goodman, John Prine) – 4:24
5. "Mind Your Own Business" (Hank Williams) – 2:54
6. "Eight Ball Blues" – 4:24
7. "City of New Orleans" – 3:52
8. "Turnpike Tom" – 4:15
9. "Yellow Coat" – 4:44
10. "So Fine" – (Johnny Otis) – 3:19
11. "Jazzman" (Edward Mark Holstein) – 3:42
12. "Would You Like to Learn to Dance?" – 4:07
13. "Election Year Rag" - 2:03
14. "Georgia Rag" - 2:00

== Personnel ==
- Steve Goodman – vocals, guitar
- David Briggs – piano
- Kenny Buttrey – percussion
- Vassar Clements – fiddle
- Norbert Putnam – bass
- Donnie Fritts – organ
- Bob Dylan – piano on "Election Year Rag"
- Ben Keith – dobro, guitar, pedal steel guitar
- Stephen Brunton – guitar, percussion, backing vocals
- Grady Martin – guitar
- Pete Wade – guitar
- Billy Sanford – banjo, guitar
- Bucky Willkin – guitar, backing vocals
- Kris Kristofferson – backing vocals
- Bill Swofford – backing vocals
- John Prine – backing vocals
- Charlie McCoy – harmonica, organ
- Martha McCrory – cello
- Gene Mullins – trombone
- Dennis Good – trombone
- Billy Puett – clarinet
- George Tidwell – trumpet

Production

- Norbert Putnam – producer
- Kris Kristofferson – producer
- Gene Eichelberger – engineer, mixing
- Gene Hazen – mixing
- Bob Cato – photography, design
