= Fred Holstein =

American folk singer

- Born: December 12, 1942; Chicago, Illinois
- Origin: Chicago, Illinois
- Died: January 12, 2004 (aged 61)
- Genre: Folk
- Occupation: Balladeer
- Instruments: Guitar, banjo
- Years active: 1970s–2002

Fred Holstein (December 9, 1942 – January 12, 2004) was an American folk music singer. Holstein was a prominent figure in the Chicago folk music scene in the 1960s through 1980s. He co owned two clubs in the Old Town and Lincoln Park neighborhoods. Unlike many of his contemporaries, he was not a songwriter, but his talent for singing with his resonant baritone and arranging was well recognized.

== Early life ==
Holstein was born on December 9, 1942, and grew up in Chicago's South Shore neighborhood. According to his obituary, his parents ran a drug store at 79th Street and Michigan Avenue. After seeing a Pete Seeger concert, he decided he wanted to study folk music.

== Career ==
He started his future career by buying a guitar and teaching himself to play by singing along with records and studying songbooks. Fred took lessons at Chicago's Old Town School of Folk Music starting in 1960. He had a long relationship with the school afterward, even working in the Folklore center music store. Of the Old Town School Fred said:

Holstein began playing around Chicago in the 1960s, first at places like the Old Town Pub and a bar in Morton Grove called Scot's Cellar. At Scot's, Holstein first met and began mentoring younger fellow musician Steve Goodman. He briefly tried making a living as a performer in San Francisco and Greenwich Village in New York City, but soon returned to Chicago.

Holstein's fame did not extend much beyond Chicago, as he did not tour or record much, but within Chicago he was well known. He was a resident musician at the now defunct Chicago clubs, "Somebody Else's Troubles" and "The Earl of Old Town". Holstein first played at the Earl in 1966. Fred had an easy-going stage presence, routinely tailoring set lists to friends birthdays or requests, but would not tolerate a disruptive audience and tell them to "shut up". Fred loved to constantly share new songs with his audience as soon as he could, he would attempt a new song as soon as he could stumble through it.

An anchor of the Chicago folk scene and a contemporary of Steve Goodman, John Prine, Bonnie Koloc. Holstein co-owned two folk music clubs in the Old Town, and Lincoln Park, neighborhoods, including Somebody Else's Troubles and Holstein's. Holstein was known for his knowledge of several hundred songs and "instant recall," as well as being able to accompany himself on guitar, banjo, and twelve string. Holstein was an admirer of ballad singers like Woody Guthrie and Utah Phillips. He would remind aspiring musicians to "Understand the song. It is a lot more important than you are."

Holstein and his brother Ed would regularly open shows his club, and sometimes headline them. The club closed in 1987. In his later years, Holstein performed two or three times a year at the Abbey Pub, an Irish bar on the Northwest Side of Chicago, often with Ed as the opener. In his final years, Holstein suffered from various illnesses and was unable to perform at the annual New Year's Eve concert at WFMT on December 31, 2003.

== Personal life ==
He died at Swedish Covenant Hospital in Chicago of complications from emergency abdominal surgery on January 12, 2004. He was survived by his mother and two younger brothers, Ed and Alan.

== Discography ==
=== Albums ===
- Chicago and Other Ports, 1977 Philo Records
- For All The Good People, 1978 Holstein (Self-released)
- A Collection, 2001 (Self-Released) - Compilation 1977–1983
- Remembering Fred: A Tribute to Fred Holstein, 2004 Old Town School Recordings - Recorded live at a memorial concert at the Old Town School of Folk Music, April 3, 2004
- Live at the Earl of Old Town, 2008 Eddie Holstein (Self-Released) - Recorded June 30, 1969

=== Other appearances ===
- Gathering at the Earl of Old Town, 1971 Dunwich - performs "Jimmy Newman", "The Man Who Sings", "Goin' Home"
- Tribute To Steve Goodman, 1985 Red Pajamas Records - performs "The Thanksgiving Song"
- Rebel Voices: Songs of the Industrial Workers of the World, 1988 Flying Fish Records - performs "Banks Of Marble", "Stung Right"
- I Love Toy Trains(VHS), 1993-1994 TM Books and Video - performs, "I've Been Working on the Railroad", "Wabash Cannonball" and "Gonna Travel Along (instrumental)"
- Toy Train Revue, 1991–1995, 2013-2015 TM Books And Video - performs "Toy Train Revue Theme"(instrumental)
