= Jessie's Jig & Other Favorites =

Studio album by Steve Goodman
- Released: 1975
- Studio: Paragon, Chicago, IL
- Genre: Folk, country
- Length: 36:52
- Label: Asylum
- Producer: Steve Goodman

Steve Goodman chronology
Somebody Else's Troubles (1972)	Jessie's Jig & Other Favorites (1975)	Words We Can Dance To (1976)

Jessie's Jig & Other Favorites is an album by singer/songwriter Steve Goodman, released in 1975. It was Goodman's first release on Asylum Records. Jethro Burns and Vassar Clements contributed to the album.

== Reception ==
Professional ratings
Review scores
Source	Rating
AllMusic	3/5 stars
Christgau's Record Guide	B

Robert Christgau assigned it a "B" rating, opining: "Very likable, bright and open and good humored, but like so many solo performers, folkies especially, he can't fill an album... his talent requires mood changes more conspicuous than so subtle an instrumentalist, or so thin a vocalist, can provide."

In reviewing the 1999 reissue, AllMusic critic Sharon Witmer wrote: "The title cut is a rousing number on which Goodman is joined by a stellar cast of musicians... sounds like an old-timey hoedown. It did Steve Goodman proud and is a fitting way to remember this ephemeral, but brilliant shooting star in the musical firmament."

== Track listing ==
1. "Door Number Three" (Jimmy Buffett, Steve Goodman) – 3:40
2. "Blue Umbrella" (John Prine) – 3:54
3. "This Hotel Room" (Goodman) – 3:36
4. "Spoon River" (Michael Peter Smith) – 4:52
5. "Jessie's Jig (Rob's Romp, Beth's Bounce)" (Goodman, Bill Swofford) – 2:22
6. "It's a Sin to Tell a Lie" (Billy Mayhew) – 2:08
7. "I Can't Sleep" (Goodman) – 3:57
8. "Moby Book" (Goodman, David Amran) – 3:10
9. "Lookin' for Trouble" (Goodman) – 4:38
10. "Mama Don't Allow It" (Sammy Cahn, Cow Cow Davenport) – 4:35

== Personnel ==
- Steve Goodman – vocals, guitar
- Jethro Burns – mandolin
- Vassar Clements – fiddle
- Carl Martin – mandolin, backing vocals
- Hugh McDonald – bass, double bass
- Howard Armstrong – fiddle
- Ted Bogan – guitar
- Sheldon Plotkin – drums, percussion
- Bill Swofford – guitar, backing vocals
- Winnie Winston – banjo, pedal steel guitar
- Saul Broudy – harmonica, harp
- Steve Burgh – guitar
- John Burns – guitar
- Jeff Gutcheon – piano, keyboards
- Diane Holmes – backing vocals
- Bonnie Koloc – backing vocals
- Raun MacKinnon – backing vocals
- Jack the Bear – trumpet
- Ken Bloom – clarinet
- Abby Newton – cello

Production

- Steve Goodman – producer, mixing
- Hank Neuberger – engineer
- Glen Christensen – art direction
- Henry Diltz – photography
