= Steve Goodman =

American folk music singer-songwriter (1948–1984)

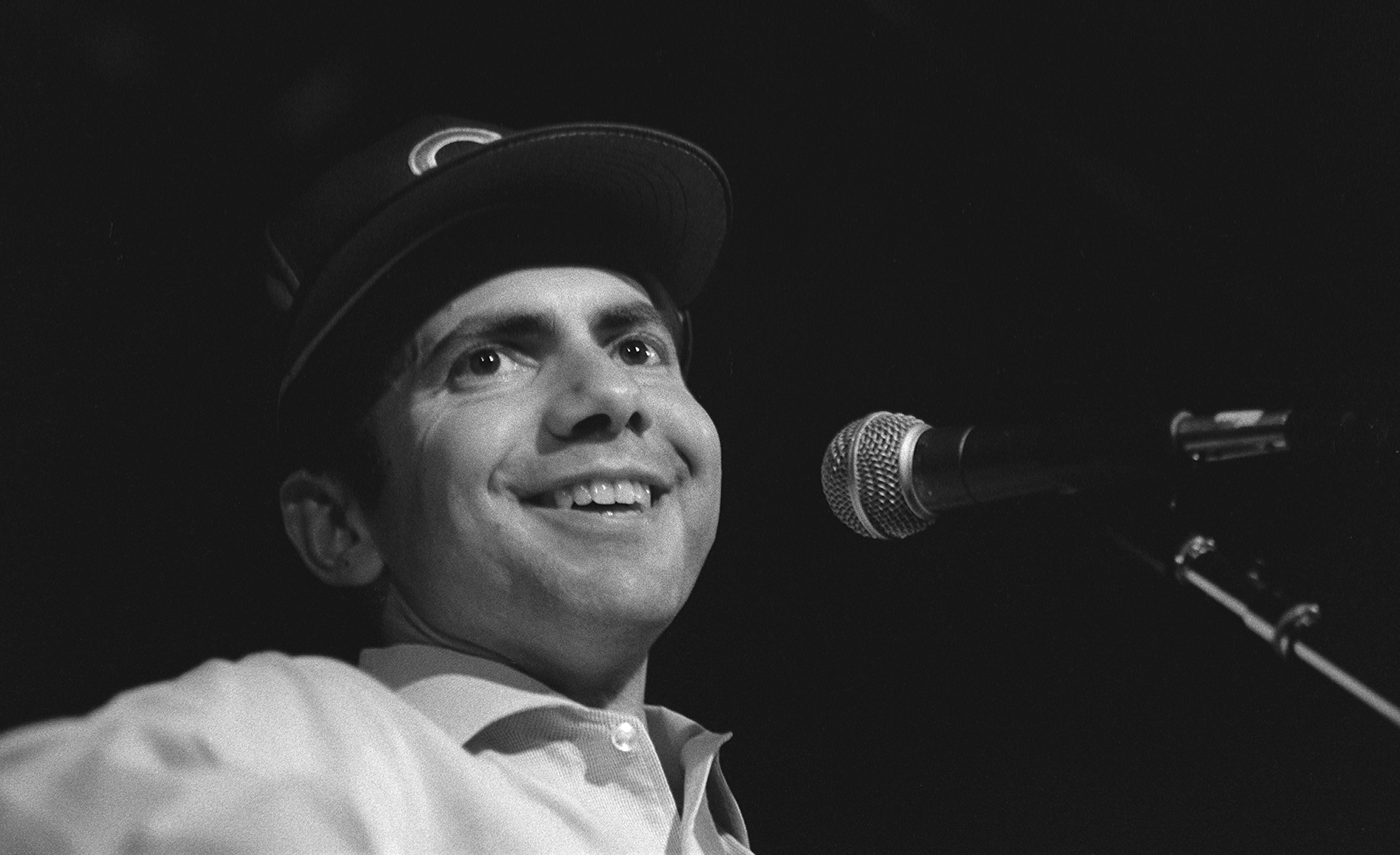
- Goodman in 1983

Background information
- Born: Steven Benjamin Goodman; July 25, 1948; Chicago, Illinois, U.S.
- Died: September 20, 1984 (aged 36) Seattle, Washington, U.S.
- Genres: Folk; country; rock; pop; blues
- Occupations: Musician, songwriter
- Instruments: Vocals; guitar
- Years active: 1968–1984
- Labels: Buddah, Asylum, Red Pajamas
- Spouse: Nancy Pruter (m. 1970)

Steven Benjamin Goodman (July 25, 1948 – September 20, 1984) was an American folk and country singer-songwriter from Chicago. He wrote the song "City of New Orleans", which was recorded by artists including Arlo Guthrie, John Denver, Willie Nelson, and Judy Collins. In 1985, Goodman received the Grammy songwriter award for best country song. Goodman co-wrote "You Never Even Call Me by My Name", which became the best-selling song of country musician David Allan Coe. A lifelong Chicago Cubs fan, Goodman wrote "Go Cubs Go". Goodman died of leukemia in September 1984.

== Personal life ==
Goodman was born on Chicago's North Side to a middle-class Jewish family. He began writing and performing songs as a teenager. He graduated from Maine East High School in Park Ridge, Illinois, in 1965, where he was a classmate of Hillary Clinton's. During high school, he began his public singing career by leading the junior choir at Temple Beth Israel in Albany Park. In the fall of 1965, he entered the University of Illinois and pledged the Sigma Alpha Mu fraternity. In college, he formed a cover band called the Juicy Fruits, with Goodman on lead guitar, Ron Banyon on rhythm guitar, Steve Hartmann on bass, and Elliot Englehardt on drums. He left college after one year to pursue his musical career. In the early spring of 1967, Goodman went to New York City, staying for a month in a Greenwich Village brownstone across the street from the Cafe Wha?, where he performed regularly.

Returning to Chicago, he intended to restart his education. In 1968, Goodman began performing at the Earl of Old Town and The Dangling Conversation coffeehouse with John Prine and Gary Growden, and attracted a following. By 1969, Goodman was a regular performer in Chicago, while attending Lake Forest College. During this time, Goodman supported himself by singing advertising jingles. Also during this time, he discovered the cause of his continuous fatigue was actually leukemia. This led him to drop out of school again to pursue his music full time.

In September 1969, he met Nancy Pruter (sister of rhythm and blues writer Robert Pruter), who was attending college and working as a waitress. They were married in February 1970. Though he experienced periods of remission, Goodman never felt that he was living on anything other than borrowed time, and some critics, listeners, and friends have said that his music reflects this sentiment. His wife, writing in the liner notes to the posthumous collection No Big Surprise, characterized him this way:

Basically, Steve was exactly who he appeared to be: an ambitious, well-adjusted man from a loving, middle-class Jewish home in the Chicago suburbs, whose life and talent were directed by the physical pain and time constraints of a fatal disease which he kept at bay, at times, seemingly by willpower alone.... Steve wanted to live as normal a life as possible, only he had to live it as fast as he could.... He extracted meaning from the mundane.

== Career ==
He played the Philadelphia Folk Festival six times between 1970 and 1978. Goodman's songs first appeared on Gathering at the Earl of Old Town, an album produced by Chicago record company Dunwich in 1971. As a close friend of Earl Pionke's, the owner of the folk music bar, Goodman performed at the Earl dozens of times, including customary New Year's Eve concerts. He also remained closely involved with Chicago's Old Town School of Folk Music, where he had met and mentored his friend John Prine.

Later in 1971, Goodman was playing at a Chicago bar called the Quiet Knight as the opening act for Kris Kristofferson. Impressed with Goodman, Kristofferson introduced him to Paul Anka, who brought Goodman to New York City to record some demonstration tapes. This resulted in Goodman signing a contract with Buddah Records. Also during that gig, Goodman brought Kristofferson and Anka to meet John Prine who was playing at the Earl of Old Town.

All this time, Goodman had been busy writing many of his most enduring songs, and this avid songwriting led to an important break for him. While at the Quiet Knight, Goodman saw Arlo Guthrie and asked him to let him play a song for him. Guthrie grudgingly agreed on the condition that Goodman buy him a beer first; Guthrie would then listen to Goodman for as long as it took Guthrie to drink the beer. Goodman played "City of New Orleans", which Guthrie liked enough that he asked to record it.

Guthrie's version of Goodman's song, about the Illinois Central's City of New Orleans train, became a top-20 hit in 1972 and provided Goodman with enough financial and artistic success to make music a full-time career. The song became an American standard, covered by such musicians as Johnny Cash, Judy Collins, Chet Atkins, Lynn Anderson, and Willie Nelson, whose recorded version earned Goodman a posthumous Grammy for Best Country Song in 1985. A French translation of the song, "Salut les Amoureux", was recorded by Joe Dassin in 1973.

A Dutch singer, Gerard Cox, heard the French version while on holiday and translated it into Dutch, titled " 't Is Weer Voorbij Die Mooie Zomer" ("And again that beautiful summer has come to an end"). It reached number one on the Dutch top 40 in December 1973 and has become a classic, which is still played on Dutch radio. Inspired by this version, Rudi Carrell, a Dutch TV host and entertainer who was also very successful in Germany, covered the song with German lyrics ("Wann wird's mal wieder richtig Sommer?") in 1975. It peaked number 18 in the Top 40 and has become a radio classic that gains airplay in rainy summers. Frankfurt pop rock band Creme 21 also had a moderate hit with a cover of that adaptation in 1996 (reaching Number 36), which was accompanied by a music video paying tribute to Carrell. A Hebrew version of the song "Shalom Lach Eretz Nehederet" was sung by Israeli singer Yehoram Gaon in 1977 and became an immediate hit. Lyrically, the French, Dutch, German, and Hebrew versions bear no resemblance to Goodman's original lyrics.

According to Goodman, the song was inspired by a train trip his wife and he took from Chicago to Mattoon, Illinois. According to the liner notes on the Steve Goodman anthology No Big Surprise, "City of New Orleans" was written while on the campaign trail with Senator Edmund Muskie.

In 1974, singer David Allan Coe achieved considerable success on the country charts with Goodman and John Prine's "You Never Even Call Me by My Name", a song which good-naturedly spoofed stereotypical country music lyrics. Prine refused to take a songwriter's credit for the song, although Goodman bought Prine a jukebox as a gift from his publishing royalties. Goodman's name is mentioned in Coe's recording of the song, in a spoken epilogue in which Goodman and Coe discuss the merits of "the perfect country and western song".

Goodman's success as a recording artist was more limited. Although he was known in folk circles as an excellent and influential songwriter, his albums received more critical than commercial success. One of Goodman's biggest hits was a song he did not write: "The Dutchman", written by Michael Peter Smith. He reached a wider audience as the opening act for Steve Martin while Martin was at the height of his stand-up popularity.

During the mid- and late '70s, Goodman became a regular guest on Easter Sunday on Vin Scelsa's radio show in New York City. Scelsa's personal recordings of these sessions eventually led to an album of selections from these appearances, The Easter Tapes.

In 1977, Goodman performed on Tom Paxton's live album New Songs From the Briarpatch (Vanguard Records), which contained some of Paxton's topical songs of the 1970s, including "Talking Watergate" and "White Bones of Allende", as well as a song dedicated to Mississippi John Hurt entitled "Did You Hear John Hurt?"

During the fall of 1979, Goodman was hired to write and perform a series of topical songs for National Public Radio. Although Goodman and Jethro Burns recorded 11 songs for the series, only five of them, "The Ballad of Flight 191" about a plane crash, "Daley's Gone", "Unemployed", "The Twentieth Century is Almost Over", and "The Election Year Rag", were used on the air before the series was cancelled.

Goodman wrote and performed many humorous songs about Chicago, including three about the Chicago Cubs: "A Dying Cub Fan's Last Request", "When the Cubs Go Marching In", and "Go, Cubs, Go" (which has frequently been played on Cubs broadcasts and at Wrigley Field after Cubs wins). He wrote "Go, Cubs, Go" out of spite after then-GM Dallas Green called "A Dying Cub Fan's Last Request" too depressing. The Cubs songs grew out of his fanatical devotion to the team, which included many clubhouse and on-field visits with Cubs players. He wrote other songs about Chicago, including "The Lincoln Park Pirates", about the notorious Lincoln Towing Service, and "Daley's Gone", about Mayor Richard J. Daley. Another comic highlight is "Vegematic", about a man who falls asleep while watching late-night TV and dreams he ordered many products that he saw on infomercials. He could also write serious songs, most notably "My Old Man", a tribute to Goodman's father, Bud Goodman, a used-car salesman and World War II veteran.

Goodman won his second Grammy, for Best Contemporary Folk Album, in 1988 for Unfinished Business, a posthumous album on his Red Pajamas Records label.

Many fans become aware of Goodman's work through other artists, such as Jimmy Buffett. Buffett has recorded several of Goodman's songs, including "This Hotel Room", "Banana Republics", and "California Promises", as well as songs co-written with Buffett: "Door Number Three", "Woman Goin' Crazy on Caroline Street", "Frank and Lola", "It's Midnight and I'm not Famous Yet", and "Where's the Party?". Jackie DeShannon covered Goodman's "Would You Like to Learn to Dance" on her 1972 album, Jackie.

Goodman's posthumously released album, Santa Ana Winds, included a tribute to Carl Martin, "You Better Get It While You Can (The Ballad of Carl Martin)", celebrating the joy both found in their music, and a refrain of, "From the cradle to the crypt, Is a mighty short trip. So you better get it while you can".

== Death ==
On September 20, 1984, Goodman died of leukemia at the University of Washington Medical Center in Seattle, Washington. He was 36 years old.

On October 2, after clinching the National League East division title, the Cubs played their first postseason game since the 1945 World Series. Filling in for Goodman, who had been scheduled to sing "The Star-Spangled Banner" before the game, Jimmy Buffett dedicated the song to him.

In April 1988, some of Goodman's ashes were scattered at Wrigley Field, the home of the Cubs, paralleling lyrics from "A Dying Cub Fan's Last Request".

Goodman was survived by his wife and three daughters.

== Legacy ==
In 2006, Goodman's daughter, Rosanna, issued My Old Man, an album of a variety of artists covering her father's songs.

In 2007, the Chicago Cubs began playing Goodman's 1984 song "Go, Cubs, Go" after each home game win. When the Cubs made it to the playoffs, interest in the song and Goodman resulted in several newspaper articles about him. Illinois Lieutenant Governor Pat Quinn declared October 5, 2007, Steve Goodman Day in the state. In 2010, Illinois Representative Mike Quigley introduced a bill renaming the Lakeview post office on Irving Park Road in honor of Goodman. The bill was signed by President Barack Obama on August 3, 2010.

The night that Goodman introduced John Prine to Kris Kristofferson and Paul Anka has been commemorated in a musical show entitled Chicago 1971 that was developed by John Ballantyne and Gus Noble.

== Discography ==
=== Albums ===
Date	Title	Label	Number	Comments
1970	Gathering at the Earl of Old Town	Dunwich	670	Various artists including Goodman, Jim Post, Ed Holstein, Fred Holstein, Ginni Clemmens
1971	Steve Goodman	Buddah	BDS-5096	
1972	Somebody Else's Troubles	Buddah	BDS-5121	
1975	Jessie's Jig & Other Favorites	Asylum	7E-1037	
1976	Words We Can Dance To	Asylum	7E-1061	
1977	Say It in Private	Asylum	7E-1118	
1979	High and Outside	Asylum	6E-174	
1980	Hot Spot	Asylum	6E-297	
1983	Artistic Hair	Red Pajamas	RPJ-001	Live
1984	Affordable Art	Red Pajamas	RPJ-002	
1984	Santa Ana Winds	Red Pajamas	RPJ-003	First posthumous release
1987	Unfinished Business	Red Pajamas	RPJ-005	Second posthumous release, Grammy award
1996	The Easter Tapes	Red Pajamas	RPJ-009	18 live cuts from WNEW-FM 1970's broadcasts, liner notes by host Vin Scelsa
2000	Live Wire	Red Pajamas	RPJ-015	Live at Bayou Theater, early 1980s
2006	Live at the Earl of Old Town	Red Pajamas	RPJ-017	Live, August 1978
2013	Don't Blame Me	Red Pajamas	RPJ-019	Live, April 1, 1973, Chicago
2020	Live '69	Omnivore	OV-369	Live, November 10, 1969, University of Illinois, Champaign, IL
2021	It Sure Looked Good on Paper	Omnivore	OV-413	20 previously unreleased solo and full band studio demos

=== Compilation albums ===
Date	Title	Label	Number	Comments
1976	The Essential Steve Goodman	Buddah	BDS-5665-2	2 LP compilation, 20 cuts from Steve Goodman and Somebody Else's Troubles
1988	The Best of the Asylum Years, Volume One	Red Pajamas	RPJ-006	Compilation
1988	The Best of the Asylum Years, Volume Two	Red Pajamas	RPJ-007	Compilation
1989	City of New Orleans	Pair Records (Buddha)	PCD-2-1233	Single CD compilation, 19 cuts from Steve Goodman and Somebody Else's Troubles
1989	The Original Steve Goodman	Special Music (Buddha)	SCD-4923	Compilation, 8 cuts from Steve Goodman and Somebody Else's Troubles
1994	No Big Surprise – The Steve Goodman Anthology	Red Pajamas	RPJ-008	2 CD compilation (1 studio, 1 live)
2008	The Baseball Singles	Red Pajamas	RPJ-018	Compilation EP with 4 baseball-themed cuts

=== Videos ===
Date	Title	Label	Number	Formats	Comments
2003	Steve Goodman: Live From Austin City Limits	Red Pajamas	RPJ-500	VHS, DVD	1977 & 1982 live shows with John Prine and Jethro Burns, plus interviews
