= Kenneth C. "Jethro" Burns =

American mandolinist and comic singer (1920–1989)

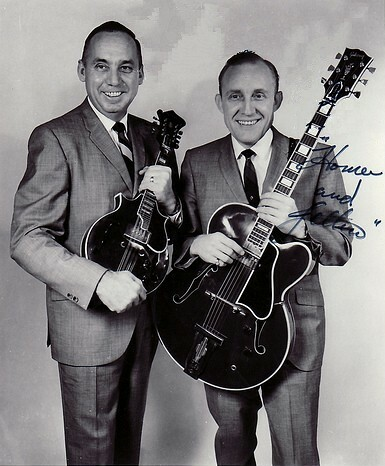
- Burns (left) with Henry Haynes as "Homer and Jethro"

Background information
- Also known as: Jethro
- Born: Kenneth Charles Burns; March 10, 1920; Conasauga, Tennessee, U.S.
- Died: February 4, 1989 (aged 68) Evanston, Illinois, U.S.
- Genres: Country; jazz; folk; bluegrass; comedy
- Instrument: Mandolin
- Years active: 1936–1989
- Labels: King, RCA, Red Pajamas
- Formerly of: Homer and Jethro, The Nashville String Band

Kenneth Charles "Jethro" Burns (March 10, 1920 – February 4, 1989) was an American mandolinist and one-half of the comedy duo Homer and Jethro with Henry D. "Homer" Haynes.

== Biography ==
Burns was born in Conasauga, Tennessee, on March 10, 1920. His family moved to Knoxville, Tennessee, when he was three. In 1936, he auditioned for a talent contest at Knoxville radio station WNOX, where he met Henry Haynes, also 16. The two formed a duo and WNOX program director Lowell Blanchard gave them the stage names Homer and Jethro after forgetting their names on the air.

Burns was drafted into the US Army and served in Europe during World War II and reunited with Haynes, who had served in the Pacific, in Knoxville in 1945. By 1947, the duo moved to Cincinnati, Ohio, and were working at WLW on the station's Midwestern Hayride. They signed with King Records, where they worked as a house band and recorded singles on their own, and two years later signed with RCA Records. The pair were fired along with other stars by new management at WLW in 1948, and after a brief tour, they moved to Springfield, Missouri, and performed on KWTO with Chet Atkins, the Carter Family and Slim Wilson.

In 1949, they moved to Chicago and played at the Chicago Theatre. Between shows, they would go to WLS to appear live on National Barn Dance. While performing on WLS, Burns met and married his wife, Lois Johnson, whom he called Gussie. Her twin sister Leona was married to Atkins.

In 1959, they won a Grammy for the best comedy performance for "The Battle of Kookamonga", a parody of Johnny Horton's "Battle of New Orleans".

Burns was a highly-influential mandolin stylist, preferring clean single-note jazzy melodies and sophisticated chords over the dominant bluegrass stylings of Bill Monroe, and since he performed mostly in a country music setting, introduced many country mandolinists to sophisticated jazz harmonies and improvisational techniques, as well as standards from the songbooks of Duke Ellington, Django Reinhardt and Cole Porter.

By the 1970s, Burns's influence had spread to a younger generation of bluegrass and "new-acoustic" musicians, most notably New Grass Revival mandolinist Sam Bush. His participation in Norman Blake/Tut Taylor/Sam Bush/Butch Robins/Vassar Clements/David Holland/Jethro Burns, an independently released album produced by promoter Hank Deane, was reportedly at Bush's suggestion. During that same decade, Burns's acquaintance with bluegrass mandolinist David Grisman led to Burns's writing a number of music/humor columns in the Grisman-published journal Mandolin World News. Grisman also produced a 1978 duet album on Kaleidoscope Records, Back to Back, featuring Burns and Western swing electric mandolinist Tiny Moore. Although Burns and Moore were approximately the same age and were among the few of their generation to make their reputations playing jazz and swing mandolin, the two had never met prior to the production of the album, its liner notes report.

After Haynes died in 1971, Burns's regular musical partner was guitarist Ken Eidson, with whom he co-authored an influential mandolin method tome (Mel Bay's Complete Jethro Burns Mandolin Book, still in print), and they continued to perform as Homer and Jethro. After the partnership ended, Burns continued to play, most notably with Chicago folk singer Steve Goodman. He appeared on several of Goodman's albums and also toured nationally with him. At times he appeared in the Million Dollar Band on TV's Hee Haw with Atkins and swing fiddler Johnny Gimble. He also became a master teacher of mandolin jazz.

He died at his home in Evanston, Illinois, from cancer, on February 4, 1989.

== Honors ==
In 2001, Burns and Haynes as Homer and Jethro were posthumously inducted into the Country Music Hall of Fame.

== Discography ==
=== As leader ===
- S'Wonderful: 4 Giants of Swing (Flying Fish, 1976)
- Jethro Burns (Vivid Sound, 1977)
- Back to Back (Kaleidoscope, 1980)
- Tea for One (Kaleidoscope, 1982)
- Old Friends (Rebel, 1983)
- Jethro Live (Flying Fish, 1990)
- Swing Low, Sweet Mandolin (Acoustic Disc, 1995)
- Bye Bye Blues (Acoustic Disc, 1997)
- The Puritan Sessions (Acoustic Disc, 1998)

=== As co-leader and sideman ===
As Homer and Jethro

- 1960 Homer & Jethro at the Country Club
- 1962 Playing It Straight
- 1963 Ooh, That's Corny!
- 1968 Cool Cool Christmas

With Steve Goodman

- 1975 Jessie's Jig & Other Favorites
- 1976 Words We Can Dance To
- 1983 Artistic Hair
- 1983 Affordable Art
- 1987 Unfinished Business
- 2006 Live at the Earl of Old Town

With others

- 1958 I'll Sail My Ship Alone, Moon Mullican
- 1975 Norman Blake/Tut Taylor/Sam Bush/Butch Robins/Vassar Clements/David Holland/Jethro Burns
- 1976 S'Wonderful: 4 Giants of Swing
- 1978 Bruised Orange, John Prine
- 1978 Joe in Chicago, Joe Venuti
- 1979 Back to Back, Tiny Moore
- 1979 Rhapsody for Banjo, Larry McNeely
- 1985 Late as Usual, Sam Bush
- 1987 Buddies of Swing, Peter Ostroushko
- 1993 Freight Train Boogie, The Delmore Brothers
- 1994 Jazz from the Hills, Country All Stars
- 1996 DGQ-20, David Grisman Quintet
- 1996 Rose Marie, Slim Whitman
- 1996 The Last Letter, Rex Griffin
- 2002 Hillbilly Bebop, Hank Penny
- 2005 Keep on the Sunny Side: Her Life in Music, June Carter Cash
- 2006 Blue Suede Shoes: Gonna Shake This Shack Tonight, Pee Wee King
- 2007 The Early Years 1946–1957, Chet Atkins
