= Michael Peter Smith =

American singer-songwriter (1941–2020)

- Born: September 7, 1941; South Orange, New Jersey, U.S.
- Died: August 3, 2020 (aged 78)
- Genres: Rock, folk rock
- Instrument: Guitar
- Years active: 1962–2020
- Labels: Decca Records (1960s); Flying Fish Records (1980s–2020)

Michael Peter Smith (September 7, 1941 – August 3, 2020) was an American, Chicago-based singer-songwriter. Rolling Stone once called him "the greatest songwriter in the English language". Mark Guarino of Chicago Reader wrote, "He never became a household name the way John Prine and Steve Goodman did, but his lengthy discography is just as mighty." He sang and composed from the 1960s, and his rich and challenging songs have been recorded by more than 30 performers.

He is best known for writing "The Dutchman", which was popularized by Goodman and also recorded by John Gorka, Brendan Grace, David Soul, Suzy Bogguss, Celtic Thunder, Liam Clancy, Makem and Clancy, Norm Hacking, Anne Hills, Mara Levine and Si Kahn, John McDermott, the New Kingston Trio, Gamble Rogers, Tom Russell, Jerry Jeff Walker, Robert James Waller, Josh White Jr., and Bernard Wrigley.

Smith was also known for his whimsical songs such as "Zippy", "Famous in France," and "Move Over Mister Gauguin."

== Biography ==
Smith was born in South Orange, New Jersey, United States. He attended Catholic schools (Our Lady of the Valley and Our Lady of Sorrows), which would shape much of his writing. A notable example is his song "Sister Clarissa".

Smith had three younger sisters and a brother and they were the basis for his autobiographical play, Michael, Margaret, Pat and Kate, originally presented at the Victory Gardens in Chicago. The play is Smith's story of his upbringing and family relationships surrounding his father's early death.

While attending Passaic Valley Regional High School in Little Falls, New Jersey, he discovered the guitar and rock-and-roll. His earliest musical influence was Elvis Presley, although Roy Rogers was a close second. According to Smith, the music "ruined my grades," however, his other love of English never suffered. An avid reader, Smith's command of the language has always shown in the literacy of his songs, and has inspired much of the acclaim he enjoyed. A Song Talk Magazine review commented that "[H]earing the songs of Michael Smith in this day and age is like reading an anthology of short stories by Hemingway after decades of only comic books."

After high school, Smith's family moved to Florida. Two years later, he started college and his interest in folk music blossomed. He cited The Kingston Trio and Harry Belafonte as his earliest folk influences. He spent three years of the 1960s working at a Miami venue called The Flick, playing six nights a week from 1966 to 1968. He was in a Peter, Paul and Mary-style trio for a couple of years which included his wife Barbara Barrow and fellow singer Ron Kickasola. They expanded into a rock band called Juarez and recorded one album for Decca before disbanding. Smith and his wife then played as an acoustic duo for most of the early 1970s.

Steve Goodman's recording of "The Dutchman" in 1973 on his album Somebody Else's Troubles, formally introduced Smith's songs to a large audience, and propelled "The Dutchman" into becoming Smith's most popular song. Because Goodman was Chicago-based and had been playing several of Smith's songs in his act, it opened a lot of opportunities for Smith in Chicago. So, in 1976 Smith and Barrow moved from Detroit to Chicago, where he became a regular in the city's folk clubs for several years, which allowed him to stop touring. During this time in the early 80s, he formed a band called Paradise with his wife, Barbara Barrows, and friends Jessica Baron and Dan Tinen. The band played regularly at the Earl of Old Towne, while Michael continued to perform regularly at the No Exit Cafe. During this period he took a day job as a clerk for Time and continued co-writing songs with notable musician friends from around the country and his songs continued to get played and recorded by others all through that time.

Besides "The Dutchman," which Suzy Bogguss covered on her debut effort Suzy in 1981, Smith classics and their interpreters included "Spoon River", a song inspired by the poems of Edgar Lee Masters, which was also recorded by Goodman. Jimmy Buffett and Goodman both recorded "Elvis Imitators", Smith's tongue in cheek ode to Presley's legion of fans. "Dead Egyptian Blues," a song about ex-pharaohs and their riches, was recorded by Trout Fishing in America. A couple of other Smith classics include "Crazy Mary", a song about the 'crazy lady next door' in everyone's life that Bonnie Koloc and also David Allan Coe recorded, and "Last Day of Pompeii", – a smooth jazz number about the city's impending disaster, which appears on recordings by Trout Fishing in America, Anne Hills, Cathy Miller, and the swing recordings of Harmonious Wail.

In 1986, Smith regularly took the stage again. He had started to work with Anne Hills, and Hills convinced Smith to record two albums for Flying Fish Records while becoming his producer and touring partner. Smith recorded Michael Smith (1986) and Love Stories (1987.) Both albums have been reissued as a single CD, which is among Acoustic Guitar's list of essential singer-songwriter albums. Hills recorded her own album of Smith songs called October Child (1993).

In the winter of 1987, Claudia Schmidt introduced Smith to theatrical director Frank Galati. It was Galati who asked Smith to write the music for Steppenwolf Theatre Company's production of John Steinbeck's The Grapes of Wrath. The Steppenwolf Theatre, founded by Gary Sinise and John Malkovich, has a glowing reputation in Chicago and nationally, and The Grapes of Wrath became a huge success, playing in Chicago, London, San Diego, and on Broadway where it received Tony Awards for Best Play and Best Director. The success of The Grapes of Wrath allowed Smith to quit his job as a clerk at Time, and his work in theater brought both new dimensions to his writing and his performances.

Smith recommenced performing regularly, both as a solo act and in a duet with Hills. He recorded his third album for Flying Fish, Time (1994), and recorded a duet album with Hills called Paradise Lost and Found (1999). He also continued to write music for theatre, including for a Colorado Children's Theatre production of The Snow Queen. Most notably though, in 1993 Chicago's Victory Gardens Theatre premiered his autobiographical play Michael, Margaret, Pat and Kate. The play won four Jeff Awards (the Chicago Theater Union's equivalent of the Tony), for Best Original Music, Best Production, Best Actor in a Revue, and Best New Work. February 2000 saw the official release of the music from Michael, Margaret, Pat and Kate by Wind River Records.

Smith performed at dozens of major folk festivals including the Kerrville Folk Festival, Black Mountain Festival, the Philadelphia Folk Festival, Owen Sound, Gamble Rogers Folk Festival, and Winnipeg Folk Festivals. He has also appeared on a number of radio programs including WUMB's Circle in the Stream, interviews with Studs Terkel on WFMT, a series of interviews on All Things Considered and Good Evening on NPR as well as interviews for the BBC in London for All Things Considered. He continued to write songs, tour regularly, and conduct songwriting workshops as well as perform frequently with Hills.

In 1999, Smith recorded the CD Two Man Band Two, a duet CD with James Lee Stanley and released in 2000 on Beachwood Recordings. He also co-wrote Shopper's "Paradise" for the Straight From the Heart musical. The sound track CD was released in 2007 on Beachwood Recordings.

In 2009, Smith won the International Hans Christian Andersen Prize for The Snow Queen. The honor is awarded to people who promote and interpret Hans Christian Andersen and his works.

Smith died from colon cancer on August 3, 2020.

== Discography ==
- Juárez (1970) (With Barbara Barrow & Ron Kickasola)
- Mickey & Babs Get Hot (With Barbara Barrow) (1972)
- Zen (With Barbara Barrow) (1974)
- Michael Smith (1986)
- Love Stories (1988)
- Time (1993)
- Michael, Margaret, Pat & Kate (1994)
- Pasiones: "Songs of the Spanish Civil War" (With Katrina & Jamie O'Reilly) (1997)
- Paradise Lost & Found (With Anne Hills) (2000)
- Two Man Band Two (With James Lee Stanley) (2000)
- Weavermania! (With Barbara Barrow, Tom Dundee & Mark Dvorak) (2000)
- There (2002)
- Fourtold (With Anne Hills, Steve Gillette & Cindy Mangsen) (2003)
- Such Things Are Finely Done (2003)
- Michael Peter Smith Live at Dark Thirty (2003)
- The Gift of the Magi (With Jamie O'Reilly) (2003)
- Just Plain Folk: John McDermott and Michael Smith (2005)
- Michael Peter Smith: Anthology One (2005)
- Love Letter On a Fish—Michael Smith Live at Tales From the Tavern Too (2008)
- The Selfish Giant (2008, 2015)
- Old Man Dancing (2012)
- Songs of a Catholic Childhood (2012)
- Songwriting (2018)
- Fifteen Songs From Moby Dick (2019)
