= The Dutchman (song) =

Song
- Released: 1968
- Songwriter: Michael Peter Smith

"The Dutchman" is a song written by Michael Peter Smith in 1968 and popularized by Liam Clancy, Brendan Grace and Steve Goodman. At the time Smith wrote the song, he had never visited the Netherlands.

The song is about an elderly couple living in Amsterdam, Margaret and the title character. The unnamed Dutchman is senile, and Margaret cares for him with a sadness over what has happened to him over the years. It is a story of unconditional love.

== Covers ==
The song has been covered by Steve Goodman, Liam Clancy, Tommy Makem, Brendan Grace Bernard Wrigley, John Gorka, Suzy Bogguss, Norm Hacking, Anne Hills, John McDermott (No. 18 Canada), The New Kingston Trio, The Shaw Brothers, Gamble Rogers, Tom Russell, Jerry Jeff Walker, Robert James Waller, Cashman & West, Josh White Jr., Woods Tea Company, Keith Harkin, Celtic Thunder, David Soul, The Quiggs, Danny Doyle, The High Kings, Tom Hoglund, Del Suggs, Bob Louisell, and Jim Sullivan.
