= John Swana =

American jazz musician

John Elliott Swana (born 1962) is an American jazz musician who played trumpet and flügelhorn until a benign tumor forced him to put down those instruments. He then picked up the valve trombone and electronic wind instrument to continue his music profession.

He began his career in clubs of his hometown of Philadelphia. He played in big bands, organ combos, and with musicians of the hard bop mainstream. Swana also worked with Ralph Bowen, Orrin Evans, Charles Fambrough, Jimmy Greene, and J. D. Walter.

== Early life ==
Born in Norristown, Pennsylvania, a suburb of Philadelphia, Swana took up Trumpet at the age of 11. He was drawn to jazz at the age of 17 after hearing Dizzy Gillespie, and the interest developed into a passion while he was in college. There he began transcribing the solos of Freddie Hubbard, Clifford Brown, Miles Davis, and Tom Harrell.

== Discography ==
=== As leader ===
- Introducing (Criss Cross Jazz, 1991) – rec. 1990
- John Swana and Friends (Criss Cross, 1992) – rec. 1991
- The Feeling's Mutual (Criss Cross, 1993)
- In the Moment (Criss Cross, 1995)
- Philly-New York Junction (Criss Cross, 1998)
- Tug of War (Criss Cross, 1999) – rec. 1997–1998
- Philly Gumbo (Criss Cross, 2001)
- On Target (Criss Cross, 2002)
- Philly Gumbo Vol.2 (Criss Cross, 2005)
- Bright Moments (Criss Cross, 2008)
- Abohm (Gallta Media, 2012)
- Channels (1K, 2019)

Collaboration
As The Philadelphia Experiment
(with Christian McBride, Ahmir "Questlove" Thompson, Pat Martino, Uri Caine, Larry Gold and Aaron Levinson)

- The Philadelphia Experiment (Ropeadope, 2001) – rec. 2000

=== As sideman ===
With Eric Alexander

- Full Range (Criss Cross, 1995)
- New York Calling (Criss Cross, 1993)

With Charles Fambrough

- City Tribes (Evidence, 1996)
- Keeper of the Spirit (AudioQuest, 1995)

With others

- Chuck Anderson, Angel Blue Tour of Jazz (Anderson Music, 2002)
- Ralph Bowen, Soul Proprietor (Criss Cross, 2001)
- Orrin Evans, Justin Time (Criss Cross, 1997)
- Jimmy Greene, Introducing Jimmy Greene (Criss Cross, 1997)
- Benny Golson, Remembering Clifford (Milestone, 1998)
- Peter Leitch, Trio/Quartet '91 (Concord Jazz, 1991)
- Donny McCaslin, Give and Go (Criss Cross, 2006)
- Clarence Penn, Play-Penn (Criss Cross, 2001)
- Chris Potter, Presenting Chris Potter (Criss Cross, 1993)
- J. D. Walter, Sirens in the C House (Dreambox 2000)

== Sources ==
- Richard Cook, Brian Morton: The Penguin Guide to Jazz Recordings. 8. Auflage. Penguin, London 2006, ISBN 0-141-02327-9.
- Lancaster Online
- Crisscross JAzz
