= Music of Vermont =

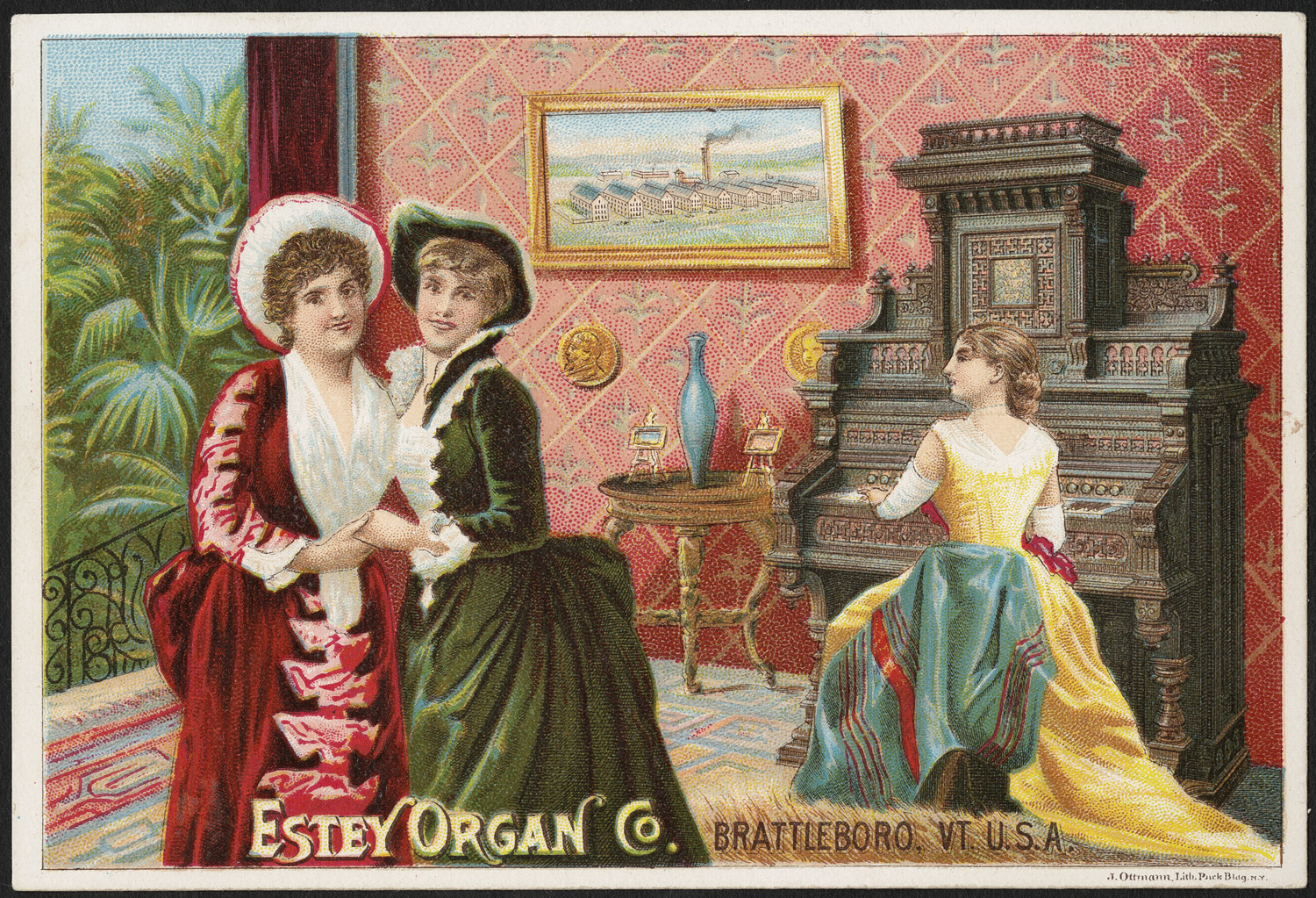

Vermont is a state in the United States. Some of the state's bands include RAQ, Phish, Twiddle, Drowningman, Grace Potter and the Nocturnals, Noah Kahan, Mellow Yellow, Rough Francis, and The Cancer Conspiracy. Burlington also has a thriving local music scene with artists like Lily Seabird, Cricket Blue, Eric George, and Addie Herbert.

The state is also home to many iconoclastic composers, from Revolutionary-era Justin Morgan through electronic/avant-gardist Otto Luening. Vermont's contemporary composers includes Jon Appleton, Dennis Bathory-Kitsz, David Gunn, Ernie Stires, Su Lian Tan, Dennis Murphy, and Gwyneth Walker.

Vermont is also a source of folk and traditional music, with such musicians as Celia Woodsmith (and her band Avi & Celia,) Pete Sutherland, Anaïs Mitchell, Woods Tea Company and many others.

== Music education and institutions ==
The Vermont Symphony Orchestra, founded in 1934, was the first state-funded orchestra in the nation. The orchestra's first artistic director was Alan Carter, followed by Efrain Guigui, Peter Brown, and Kate Tamarkin. The Artistic Director and conductor today is Jaime Laredo. Laredo performs worldwide as a soloist and frequently in duo concerts with Sharon Robinson, cellist. The VSO's "Made in Vermont" series annually commissions a Vermont composer to create a large-scale work that tours the State. Previous recipients have included G. Walker, L. Koplewitz, et al. Current composer-in-residence with the VSO is David Ludwig. The Vermont Youth Orchestra has come to prominence since the mid-1990s under the direction of composer/conductor Troy Peters. The Consortium of Vermont Composers was formed in 1988 to promote composers of classical music from the state; the Consortium calls Vermont the "most composer-friendly state" in the country.

== Music festivals ==
The Vermont Mozart Festival, founded in 1974, is the state's largest classical music festival. As of 2006, the Mozart Festival has performed well over 2,000 works in over 30 locations, including 278 of Wolfgang Amadeus Mozart's 626 compositions—possibly more than any other festival or concert series in the country.

The Marlboro Music Festival has been held since 1950. There is also a Champlain Valley Folk Festival, the New World Festival held in Randolph and the One World, One Heart Festival, sponsored by local ice cream manufacturer Ben & Jerry's. The One World, One Heart Festival is held in Warren, Vermont and features concerts by folk and country performers.

The North Branch Bluegrass Festival, held annually since 2008 in Bridgewater, Vermont is an old-fashioned family music festival. It features a weekend show of regional bluegrass musicians, music workshops, and weekend field camping.

== See also ==
- Indigenous music of North America#Eastern Woodlands
