= Bill Staines =

American folk musician (1947–2021)

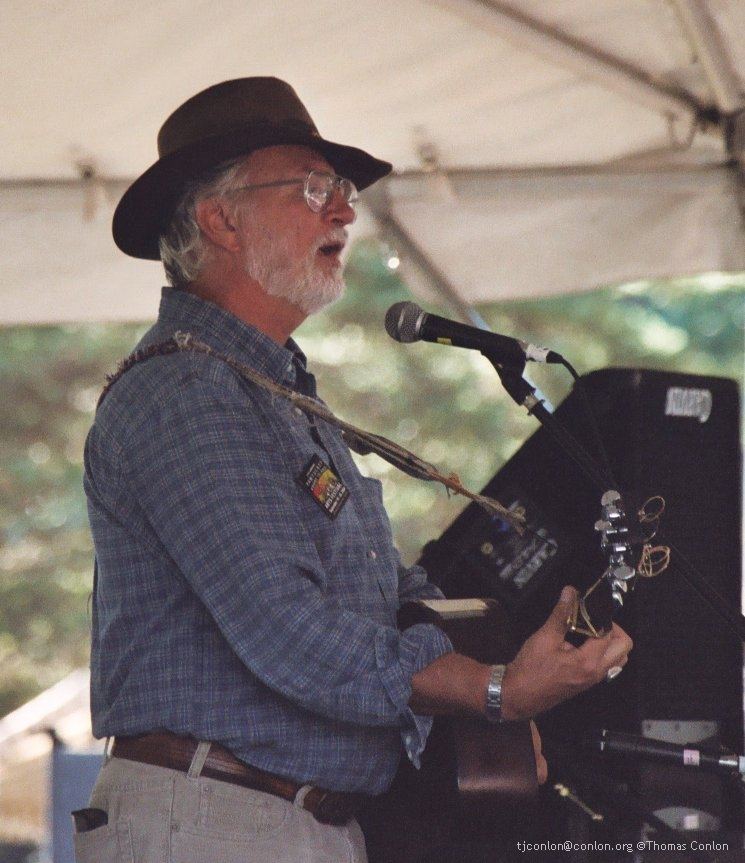
- Staines at the Pawtucket Arts Festival 2004

Background information
- Born: William Russell Staines; February 6, 1947; Medford, Massachusetts, U.S.
- Died: December 5, 2021 (aged 74)
- Genres: Folk music
- Occupation: Singer-songwriter
- Instruments: Guitar, vocals
- Years active: Early 1960s–2021
- Labels: Red House, Rounder, Philo, Mineral River
- Website: www.billstaines.net

William Russell Staines (February 6, 1947 – December 5, 2021) was an American folk musician and singer-songwriter from New Hampshire who wrote and performed songs with a wide array of subjects. Called "the Woody Guthrie of my generation" by singer-songwriter Nanci Griffith, he also wrote and recorded children's songs.

== Life and career ==
Staines was born on February 6, 1947, and raised in Lexington, Massachusetts. He began his professional career in the early 1960s in the Cambridge area. He began touring nationwide a few years later. In 1975, he won the National Yodeling Championship at the Kerrville Folk Festival in Texas. He performed about 200 times a year and appeared on A Prairie Home Companion, Mountain Stage, and The Good Evening Show.

Staines's songs include "Bridges", "Crossing the Water", "Sweet Wyoming Home", "The Roseville Fair", "A Place in the Choir", "Child of Mine", and "River". They have been recorded by many other artists, including Peter, Paul and Mary, Makem and Clancy, Nanci Griffith, Mason Williams, The Highwaymen, Glenn Yarbrough, Skip Jones, Jerry Jeff Walker, Schooner Fare, Grandpa Jones, The Grace Family, Hank Cramer, Wendy M. Grossman, and Priscilla Herdman. He recorded 22 albums, 15 of which were still in print as of 2005. Staines's songs have been published in four songbooks: If I Were a Word, Then I'd Be a Song (1980); River; Music to Me: The Songs of Bill Staines; and All God's Critters Got a Place in the Choir.

His memoir, The Tour: A Life Between the Lines, was published in 2004.

== In popular culture ==
Staines's song "The Logging Song", from the album Whistle of the Jay, was featured in "Lumberjerk", episode 12 of season 16 of American Dad.

His rendition of The Fox featured on the end credits of episode four of the second season of Deadwood.

== Personal ==
Staines lived in Rollinsford, New Hampshire, with his wife, Karen; his son, Bowen, a folk singer, and their springer spaniel, Andy, who appeared on the cover of his album Old Dogs.

Staines died from prostate cancer on December 5, 2021, at the age of 74.

== Discography ==
All references from the Acoustic Music Bill Staines Discography except when noted.

- A Bag of Rainbows (1966)
- Somebody Blue (1967)
- Bill Staines (1971)
- Third Time Around (1973)
- Miles (1975)
- Old Wood and Winter Wine (1977) with Guy Van Duser
- Just Play One Tune More (1977)
- Whistle of the Jay (1979)
- Bill Staines Live at the Coffeehouse Extemporé (1980)
- Rodeo Rose (1981)
- Sandstone Cathedrals (1983)
- Bridges (1984)
- Wild, Wild Heart (1985)
- Redbird's Wing (1988)
- The First Million Miles (1989)
- Tracks & Trails (1991)
- The Happy Wanderer (1993)
- Going to the West (1993)
- The Alaska Suite (1993)
- Looking for the Wind (1995)
- One More River (1998)
- The First Million Miles, Vol. 2 (1998)
- October's Hill (2000)
- Journey Home (2004)
- The Second Million Miles (2005)
- Old Dogs (2007)
- Beneath Some Lucky Star (2012)
