= Questlove =

American hip hop musician (born 1971)

- Questlove at the 2026 FIFA World Cup

Background information
- Also known as: Quest; Questo; BROther ?uestion; Brother Question; Qlove; ?uestlove; Questlove Gomez
- Born: Ahmir Khalib Thompson; January 20, 1971 (age 55); Philadelphia, Pennsylvania, U.S.
- Genres: Hip hop; neo soul; alternative hip hop
- Occupations: Musician; record producer; DJ; music journalist; actor; film director; author
- Instrument: Drums
- Years active: 1987–present
- Labels: Okayplayer; Def Jam
- Member of: The Philadelphia Experiment; The Randy Watson Experience; The Roots; Saturday Night Live Band; The Soultronics; Soulquarians; The Tonight Show Band
- Website: questlove.com

Signature
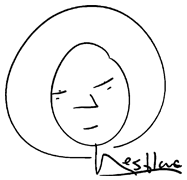

Ahmir Khalib Thompson (born January 20, 1971), known professionally as Questlove (stylized as ?uestlove), is an American drummer, record producer, disc jockey, filmmaker, music journalist, and actor. He is the drummer and joint frontman (with Black Thought) for the hip-hop band the Roots. The Roots has been the in-house band for The Tonight Show Starring Jimmy Fallon since 2014, after having fulfilled the same role on Late Night with Jimmy Fallon. Questlove is also one of the producers of the 2015 cast album of the Broadway musical Hamilton. He has also co-founded the websites Okayplayer and OkayAfrica. He joined Clive Davis Institute of Recorded Music at New York University as an adjunct professor in 2016, and hosts the podcast Questlove Supreme.

Questlove has produced recordings for artists including Elvis Costello, Common, D'Angelo, Jill Scott, Erykah Badu, Bilal, Jay-Z, Nikka Costa, Booker T. Jones, Al Green, and John Legend. He has been a member of the Soulquarians, the Randy Watson Experience, the Soultronics, the Grand Negaz and the Grand Wizzards. As an author, he has written nine books. Questlove is the recipient of many accolades, including an Academy Award, six Grammy Awards and a BAFTA Award.

== Early life ==
Ahmir Thompson was born on January 20, 1971, into a musical family in Philadelphia. His father was Arthur Lee Andrews Thompson, from Goldsboro, North Carolina. A singer, he became known as Lee Andrews and was lead with Lee Andrews & the Hearts, a 1950s doo-wop group. Ahmir's mother, Jacquelin Thompson, together with his father, was also part of the Philadelphia-based soul group Congress Alley. His parents did not want to leave him with babysitters so they took him with them when they were on tour. He grew up in backstages of doo-wop shows. When he was 7 years old, Questlove helped prepare his father’s performance outfits and when he was 10, he operated stage lights for his father’s performances. At age 12, Questlove filled in as a drummer for his father’s band, debuting as a performer at the Radio City Music Hall.

Questlove's parents enrolled him at the Philadelphia High School for the Creative and Performing Arts. By the time he graduated, he had founded a band called the Square Roots (later dropping the word "square") with his friend Tariq Trotter (Black Thought). Questlove's classmates at the Philadelphia High School for the Creative and Performing Arts included Boyz II Men, jazz bassist Christian McBride, jazz guitarist Kurt Rosenwinkel, jazz organist Joey DeFrancesco, and singer Amel Larrieux. He attended senior prom with Larrieux. After graduating from high school, he took jazz and composition classes at the Settlement Music School.

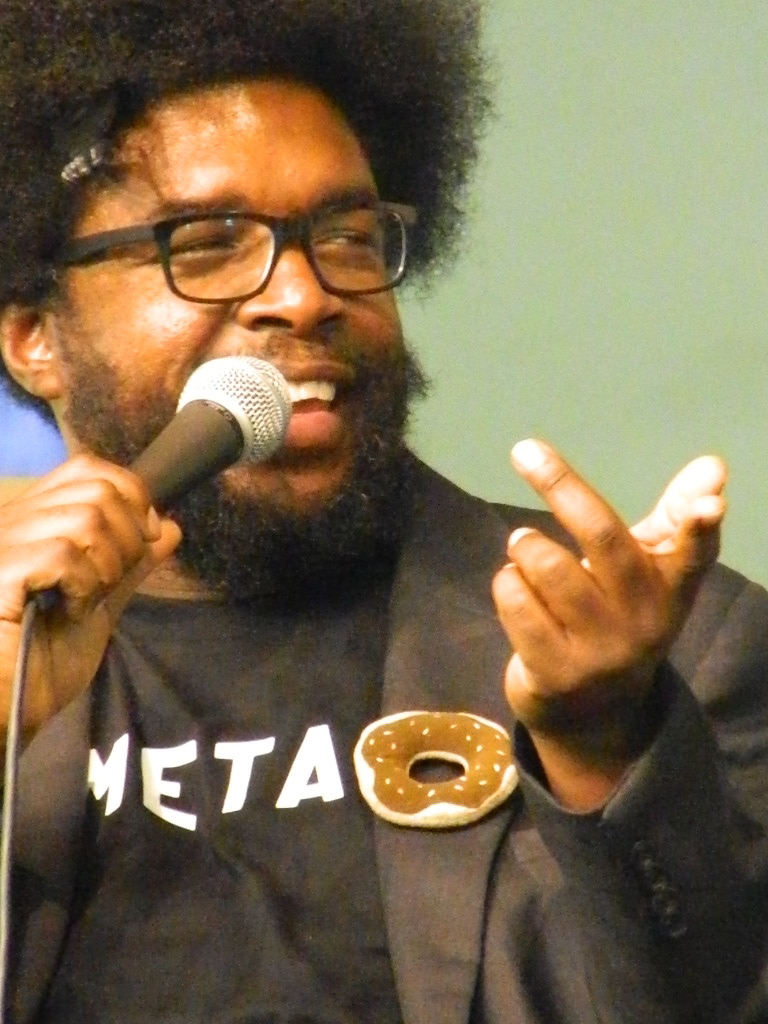
Questlove at a New York book signing, 2013

Thompson began performing on South Street in Philadelphia using drums, while Tariq rhymed over his beats and rhythms. Thompson and Jay Lonick, a childhood friend, were known for improvisational "call and response" percussion battles with plastic buckets, crates, and shopping carts. This style translated into Thompson's usual drumset arrangement, with most drums and cymbals positioned at waist level, emulating his original street setups.

For the Okayplayer platform and web television OkayAfrica TV, Questlove had his DNA tested in 2011 and genealogists researched his family ancestry. Questlove's DNA revealed from both of his biological parents that he is of West African descent, specifically the Mende people (found mostly in Sierra Leone as well as Guinea and Liberia).

From the PBS television series, Finding Your Roots, hosted by Professor Henry Louis Gates Jr., Questlove learned in December 2017 that he was descended in part from Charles and Maggie Lewis, his three times great-grandparents, who had been taken captive in warfare and sold as slaves in the port of Ouidah, Dahomey (now Benin) to American ship captain William Foster. They were among 110 slaves smuggled illegally to Mobile, Alabama, in July 1860 on the Clotilda. It was the last known slave ship to carry slaves to the United States. Questlove is the only guest to have appeared on Gates's program to be descended from slaves known by name, ship, and where they came from in Africa.

== Career ==
=== 1993–1996: Beginnings with the Roots ===
The Roots' lineup was soon completed, with Questlove on drums and percussion, Tariq Trotter and Malik B on vocals, Josh Abrams (Rubber Band) on bass (who was replaced by Leonard Hubbard in 1994), and Scott Storch on keyboards. While the group was performing a show in Germany, they recorded an album titled Organix, released by Relativity Records in 1993.

Thompson was credited as "B.R.O. the R.? (Beat Recycler of the Rhythm)" on Organix, a name he disliked. Inspired after hearing the hip-hop group A Tribe Called Quest in 1990, he chose "Questlove" as his new moniker.

The group continued recording, releasing two critically acclaimed records in 1994 and 1996, Do You Want More?!!!??! and Illadelph Halflife, respectively.

=== 1997–2003: Breakthrough, Soulquarians era, and increased output ===
In 1999, the Roots had mainstream success with "You Got Me" (featuring Erykah Badu); the song earned the band the Grammy Award for Best Rap Performance by a Duo or Group for 2000. The song helped fuel the success of their Things Fall Apart album, which has since been hailed as a classic, eventually selling platinum.

Questlove served as executive producer for Mos Def’s 1999 album Black on Both Sides, D'Angelo's 2000 album Voodoo, Slum Village's album Fantastic, Vol. 2, and Common's albums Like Water for Chocolate and Electric Circus. Besides the aforementioned albums, he has also contributed as a drummer or producer to Erykah Badu's Baduizm and Mama's Gun, Dilated Peoples' Expansion Team, Blackalicious's Blazing Arrow, Bilal's 1st Born Second, N*E*R*D's Fly or Die, Joshua Redman's Momentum, and Zap Mama's Axel Norman Ancestry In Progress, Fiona Apple's Extraordinary Machine, and Zack De La Rocha's currently unreleased solo material.

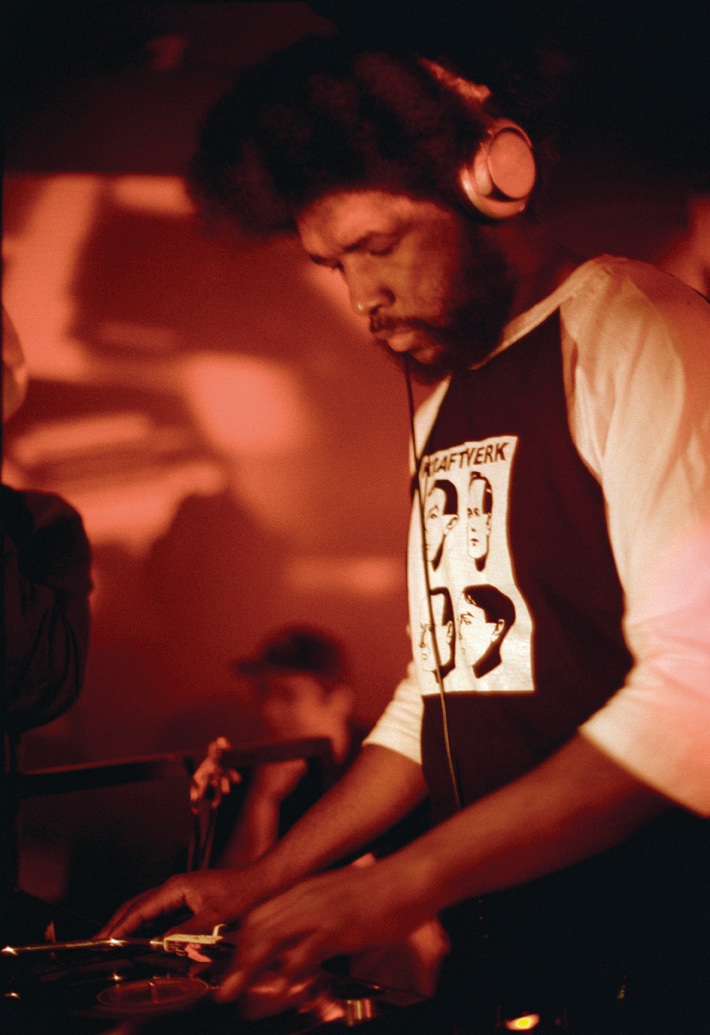
Aftershow party 1999, Germany

In 2001, he collaborated as the drummer for The Philadelphia Experiment, a collaborative instrumental jazz album featuring Christian McBride and Uri Caine, and the DJ of the compilation Questlove Presents: Babies Making Babies, released on Urban Theory Records in 2002. He played drums on Christina Aguilera's song "Loving Me 4 Me" for her 2002 album Stripped. In 2002, he and the Roots released the critically acclaimed Phrenology, which went gold.

In 2003, he played drums on John Mayer's song "Clarity" from his second album Heavier Things. He also arranged and drummed on Joss Stone's cover of the White Stripes' "Fell in Love with a Girl".

=== 2004–present: Continued output and other media endeavors ===
In 2004, the Roots released The Tipping Point, which contained a more mainstream sound, allegedly due to demands from Interscope Records. The album sold 400,000 copies. In 2004, Questlove appeared in Jay-Z's Fade to Black. In addition to appearing in the documentary portion of the film, Questlove was the drummer/musical director for all portions of the show with a live band. In 2005, Questlove appeared along with performers including Madonna, Iggy Pop, Bootsy Collins, and Little Richard in a television commercial for the Motorola ROKR phone.

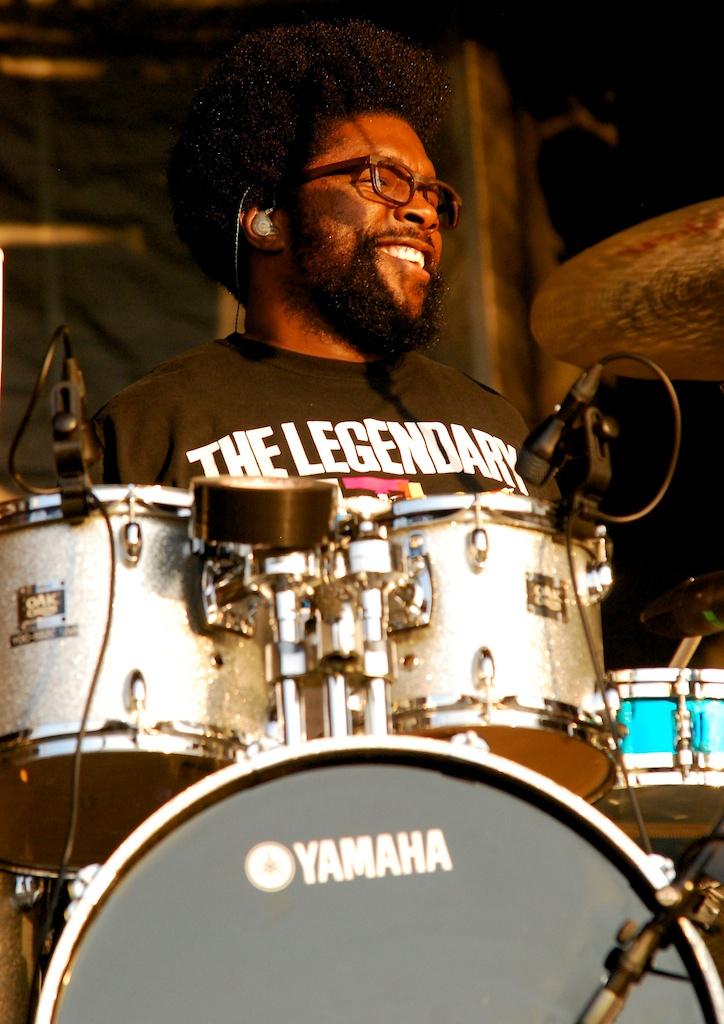
Questlove performing with the Roots at the 2011 Ottawa Bluesfest

In 2006, Questlove appeared in the film Dave Chappelle's Block Party, as well as a couple of skits on Chappelle's Show. These included the Tupac "The Lost Episodes" skit, and one featuring John Mayer, wherein Questlove performs in a barber shop, inducing the occupants to dance and rap. With the exception of the Fugees and Jill Scott, Questlove served as the drummer at the 2004 Brooklyn street concert and was the musical director for the entire show. Questlove was given an Esky for Best Scribe in Esquire magazine's 2006 Esky Music Awards in the April issue. In 2006, Questlove was one of a handful of musicians hand-picked by Steve Van Zandt to back Hank Williams Jr. on a new version of "All My Rowdy Friends Are Coming Over Tonight" for the season premiere (and formal ESPN debut) of Monday Night Football. Along with his fellow Motorola ROKR commercial co-stars, Bootsy Collins and Little Richard, Questlove's bandmates included Rick Nielsen (Cheap Trick), Joe Perry (Aerosmith), Charlie Daniels, and Bernie Worrell. In the same year, he appeared in the studio album Fly of the Italian singer Zucchero Fornaciari.

In 2007, Questlove co-produced with VH1's The Score winning producer Antonio "DJ Satisfaction" Gonzalez, from the Maniac Agenda, the theme to VH1's Hip Hop Honors 2007. Questlove joined Ben Harper and John Paul Jones for the Bonnaroo SuperJam on June 16, 2007, to play a 97-minute set.

On March 2, 2009, Questlove and the Roots began their run as house band for Late Night with Jimmy Fallon. He continues to perform with the Roots on The Tonight Show Starring Jimmy Fallon, continuing his duties from Late Night with Jimmy Fallon. He occasionally performed solos titled 're-mixing the clips', where he drew on his production and DJ abilities to dub video clips, cue audio samples in rhythm, and play drum breaks simultaneously.

In late 2009, while serving as an associate producer of the hit Broadway play Fela!, Questlove recruited Jay-Z to come on board as a producer. It was reported that Will Smith and Jada Pinkett Smith had also signed on as producers.

In January 2010, he was writing material with British singer Duffy for her second album. He has been featured in a commercial for Microsoft's short-lived mobile phone, the Kin. In 2010, he made a cameo in the music video of Duck Sauce's song "Barbra Streisand", and with the Roots released the album Dilla Joints with renditions of producer J Dilla's music. He contributed drums to the song "You Got a Lot to Learn", which was recorded for the self-titled third studio album by Evanescence, but did not appear on the final release.

Questlove was planning to collaborate with Amy Winehouse before her death in July 2011. He said "We're Skype buddies, and she wants to do a project with Mos and me. Soon as she gets her visa thing together, that's gonna happen." Rolling Stone named Questlove number 2 in the 50 Top Tweeters in Music. In June 2011, Questlove played drums alongside the Roots bassist Owen Biddle for Karmin's cover of Nicki Minaj's "Super Bass." Questlove placed 8th in the Rolling Stone Readers Pick for Best Drummers of all Time.

In September 2016, Questlove launched a weekly radio show on Pandora, Questlove Supreme. Notable guests have included Solange, Chris Rock, Maya Rudolph, and Pete Rock, among others. In 2019, Questlove Supreme moved from Pandora to iHeart Radio, where it still continues to this day. The podcast has won "Best Music Podcast" at the 2023 iHeart Podcast Awards, "Interview Of The Year" and "Podcast Of The Year" at Adweek's 2023 Audio Awards, Best Lifestyle Podcast" at the 2022 Webby Awards, along with other wins and nominations.

Alec Baldwin interviewed Questlove for the January 3, 2017, episode of Baldwin's WNYC Studios podcast Here's the Thing, where he joked about being "obsessed" with his Wikipedia profile. During the interview, he also discussed his musical and cultural interests, how the Roots started a "movement" with three 15-passenger vans and the impact of the loss of musical icons in 2016.

In 2019, Questlove partnered with Black Thought of The Roots to executive produce the documentary series Hip-Hop: The Songs That Shook America under their production company, Two One Five Entertainment. The series aired on AMC. In 2020, the pair announced a first-look deal with Universal Television to develop scripted and non-scripted programming.

He also served as the musical director and in-house DJ of the 2021 Academy Awards ceremony, having previously served as the in-house DJ for the 2020 ceremony. The music for the 2021 ceremony was largely remixed from compositions created by his band The Roots, with no in-house orchestra present. In 2021, Questlove made his directorial debut with Summer of Soul (...Or, When the Revolution Could Not Be Televised), a film about the 1969 Harlem Cultural Festival, which featured performances by Stevie Wonder, Sly and The Family Stone, Nina Simone, Mahalia Jackson, Mavis Staples, B. B. King, and many other top soul, jazz, gospel, and Latin artists of the era. Summer of Soul won both the US Grand Jury Prize and the Audience Award for documentary at the 2021 Sundance Film Festival. Disney-owned Searchlight Pictures acquired the film for distribution, setting a new Sundance Film Festival record for documentary film acquisition price. The film received acclaim from critics, with particular praise given to the restoration of the footage used. The film won numerous awards, including Best Documentary Feature at the 6th Critics' Choice Documentary Awards, where it won in all six categories in which it was nominated, Best Documentary at the 75th British Academy Film Awards, Best Documentary Feature at the 94th Academy Awards, and Best Music Film at the 64th Annual Grammy Awards.

In September 2022, it was announced that Questlove would executive produce a feature documentary about J Dilla titled Dilla Time, adapted from the Dan Charnas biography of the same name. Joseph Patel, who also produced Summer of Soul, and Darby Wheeler are slated to co-direct. In the same year, Questlove executive produced Descendant, a feature documentary on the historic discovery of The Clotilda—the last known slave ship to arrive in America illegally transporting enslaved Africans. The documentary, which made its world premiere at Sundance in 2022, was acquired by Netflix and Higher Ground, President Barack Obama and Michelle Obama's production company. The film earned several award nominations at the 2022 Critics Choice Documentary Awards, 2023 NAACP Image Awards and was also named one of the "Top 5 Documentaries" of 2022 by the National Board of Review.

In March 2023, it was announced that Questlove would direct a live-action/hybrid reimagining of the Walt Disney Productions animated film The Aristocats as his feature-film directorial debut, as well as executive-producing and overseeing the music. Will Gluck and Keith Bunin were attached to write the script, and Tariq Trotter, Shawn Gee and Zarah Zohlman were attached to executive produce on behalf of Two One Five Entertainment. Gluck and his production company Olive Bridge Entertainment were slated to produce. In August 2025, however, Questlove revealed that Disney was no longer moving forward with the film.

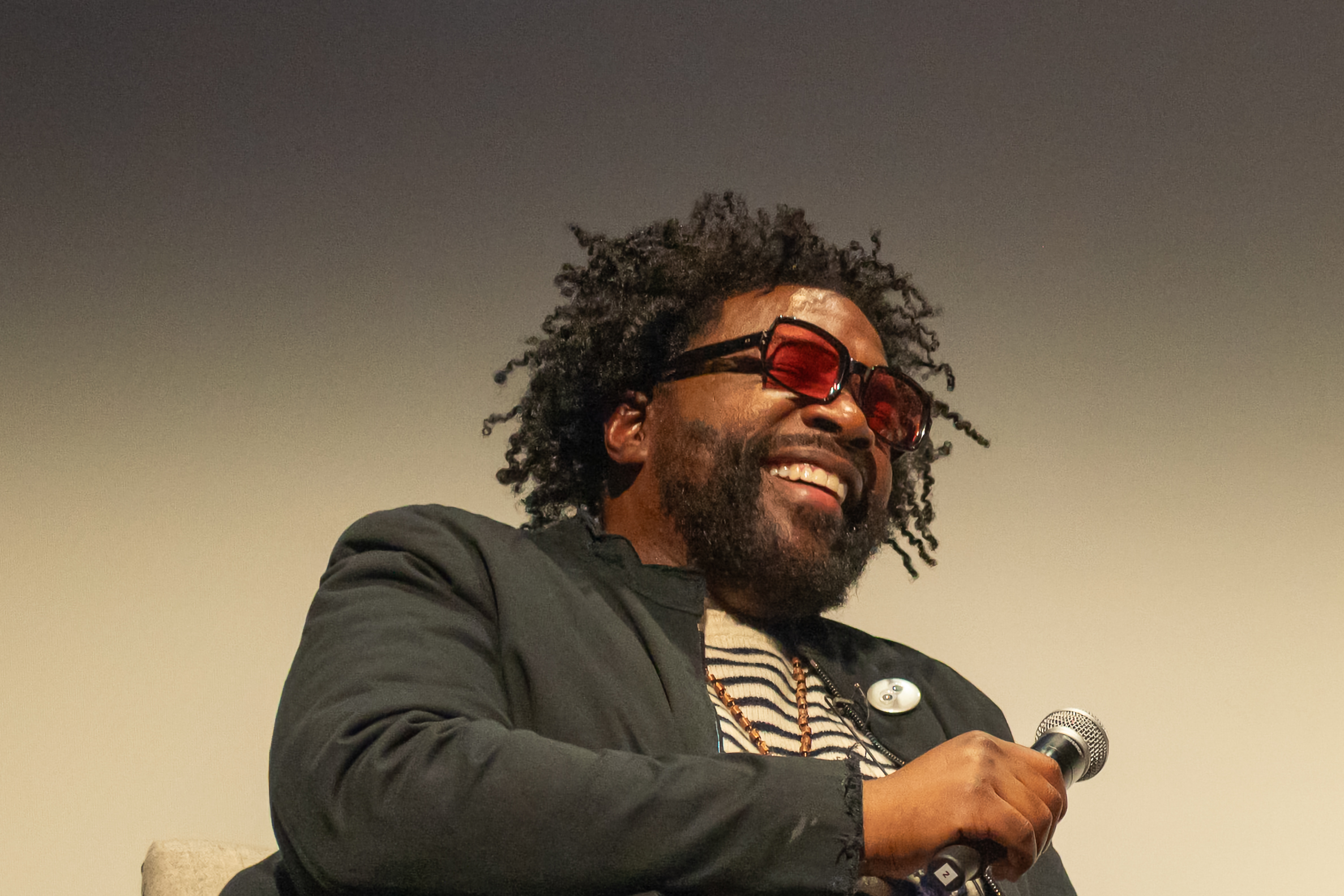
Questlove in 2025

Questlove and Black Thought, under their Two One Five banner, executively produced Rise Up, Sing Out, a collection of animated musical shorts for Disney Junior, which earned a nomination for "Outstanding Short Form Series" for the 2023 NAACP Image Awards. Questlove's web series, Quest for Craft, produced by Two One Five and launched in partnership with the single malt whiskey brand, The Balvenie, took home a Webby Award in 2023. In 2023, Questlove also executive produced Sam Pollard's The League, a documentary centered on Negro league baseball. Questlove executive produced the A&E James Brown docuseries Say It Loud, which aired in 2024.

Questlove directed Sly Lives!, a documentary film about funk musician Sly Stone, which was released on Hulu in February 2025.

=== Writing ===
In 2007, Questlove provided the foreword for the book Check the Technique. On June 18, 2013, he released a memoir, Mo' Meta Blues: The World According to Questlove. On October 22, 2013, Harper Design published the Questlove-written book, Soul Train: The Music, Dance, and Style of a Generation.

Questlove released his third book, Something to Food About: Exploring Creativity with Innovative Chefs, along with co-author Ben Greenman and photographer Kyoko Hamada, which was published by Clarkson Potter Books on April 12, 2016. In 2018, Questlove curated the soundtrack The Michelle Obama Musiaqualogy for Michelle Obama's memoir Becoming.

In April 2018, he published the book Creative Quest, regarding the concept and cultivation of creativity.

Questlove also released the cookbook Mixtape Potluck in 2019.

In December 2021, Music Is History was published by Abrams Image. The book explores popular music through the context of American history over the past 50 years, connecting issues of race, gender, politics, and identity with Questlove's point of view.

He wrote an essay for the book included in the super deluxe edition of the Beatles album Revolver, released in October 2022.

In 2023, he started his own publishing imprint, Auwa Books; he published his book Hip-Hop Is History under Auwa in 2024.

== Personal life ==
Starting in 2023, Questlove has hosted seven invite-only Game Night events for celebrities from different industries, with the address to each Game Night being undisclosed until the morning of the event. The Game Nights were ideated and planned by his Chief of Staff, Cathy Rong.

He endorsed Kamala Harris' 2024 presidential campaign.

He is a distant cousin of Melanie Lynskey, which they both found out through the show Finding your Roots. He also learned he is a direct descendant of Cudjoe Lewis, who was one of the last survivors of the Atlantic Slave Trade. In 1808, importation of slaves became illegal. His birth name was Kossola, and in 1860, he was brought in illegally in the ship Clotilda, the last slave ship. To avoid arrest, the ship was scuttled near Mobile, Alabama. After President Lincoln’s 1863 Emancipation Proclamation, Cudjoe and other survivors founded the town of Africatown, Alabama.

== Discography ==
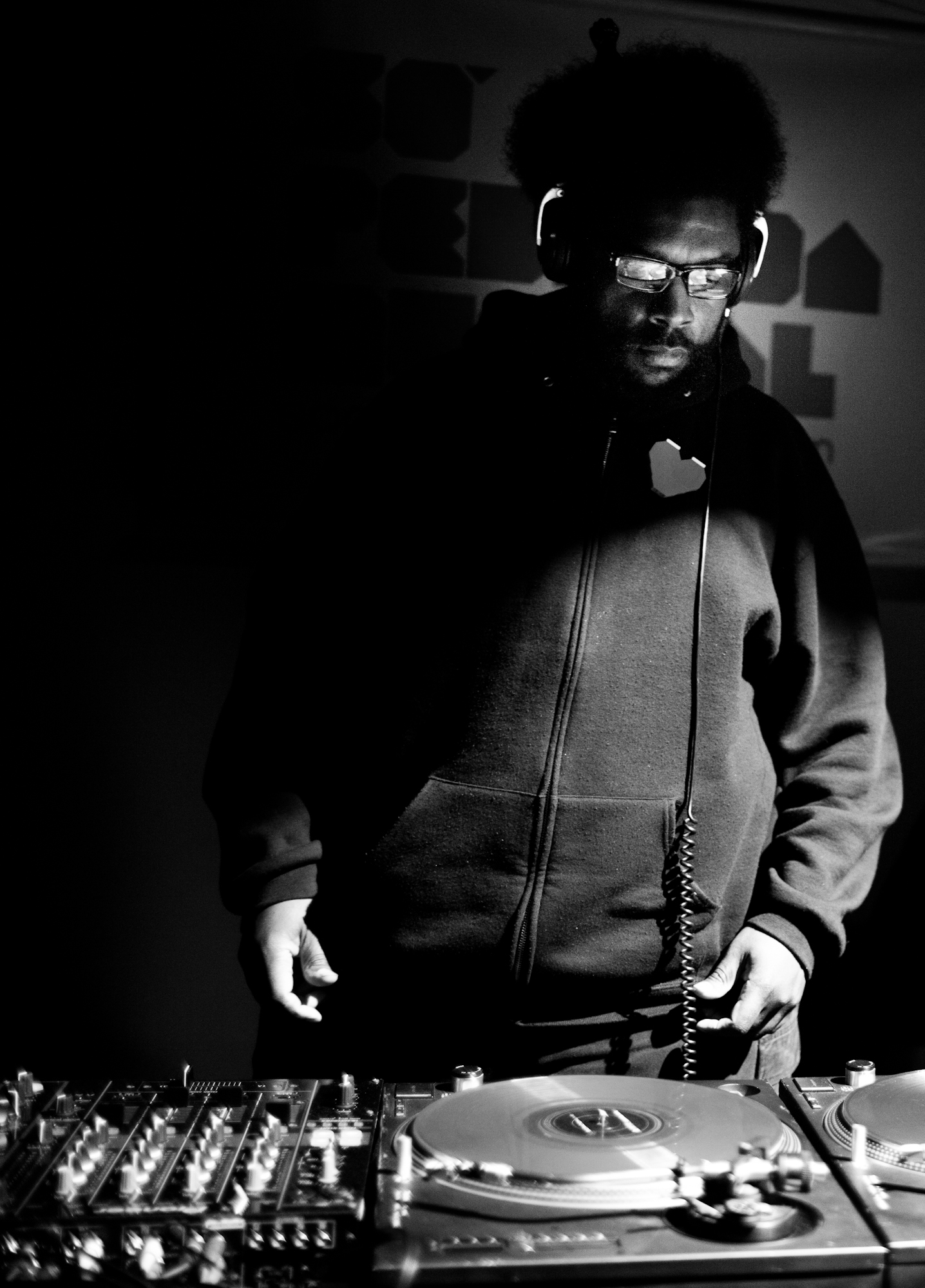
Questlove performing in 2011

=== Other studio releases ===
- Plumb – David Murray, ?uestlove, and Ray Angry (J.M.I. Recordings, 2023)
- Fight the Power: Remix – Public Enemy Featuring Nas / Rapsody / Black Thought / Jahi / YG & Questlove (Enemy Records, 2020)
- Take Me I'm Yours – Difford & Tilbrook W / Robert Glasper & ?uestlove (Yep Roc Records, 2018)
- Sufro Breaks – ?uestlove (Serato Pressings, 2017)
- The Philadelphia Experiment – as The Philadelphia Experiment with Christian McBride, Uri Caine, Pat Martino, John Swana, Larry Gold and Aaron Levinson (Ropeadope Records, 2001)

== Filmography ==
=== Film ===
Year	Title	Role	Notes	Ref(s)
2000	Bamboozled	Alabama Porch Monkeys: Levi - Musical Director		
2001	Brooklyn Babylon	Member of The Lions		
2006	Before the Music Dies	Himself / Musician: The Roots	Documentary	
2011	The Black Power Mixtape 1967–1975	Himself	Documentary	
2011	Beats, Rhymes & Life: The Travels of A Tribe Called Quest	Himself	Documentary	
2012	Bad 25	Himself	Documentary	
2013	Finding the Funk	Narrator	Co-executive producer	
2014	Top Five	—N/a	Executive music producer Composer	
2014	Mr. Dynamite: The Rise of James Brown	Himself	Documentary	
2016	Michael Jackson's Journey from Motown to Off the Wall	Himself	Documentary	
2016	Popstar: Never Stop Never Stopping	Himself	Cameo appearance	
2016	Vincent N Roxxy	—N/a	Composer	
2019	Someone Great	Himself		
2020	Soul	Curley	Voice role	
2021	Summer of Soul	—N/a	Director	
2025	Ladies & Gentlemen... 50 Years of SNL Music	—N/a	Director	
2025	Sly Lives! (aka The Burden of Black Genius)	—N/a	Director	
2025	Spinal Tap II: The End Continues	Himself	Cameo appearance	
2026	Earth, Wind & Fire (To Be Celestial vs That's the Weight of the World)	—N/a	Director	
2026	Travis Barker: Louder Than Fear	Himself	Documentary	

=== Television ===
Year	Title	Role	Notes
2003	Street Time	Composer	Episode: "Born to Kill"
2004	Chappelle's Show	Original sketch music	12 episodes
2009	Yo Gabba Gabba!	Himself	Episode: "Clean"
2009–2014	Late Night with Jimmy Fallon	—N/a	Musical director; 969 episodes
2010	Nickelodeon Presents History and Heritage	Composer	Television film
2010	VH1 Rock Docs	Himself	Episode: "Soul Train: The Hippest Trip in America"
2011	Philly's 4th of July Jam	Music director	Television special
2012	iCarly	Himself	Episode: "iShock America"
2012	The Cleveland Show	Himself (voice)	Episode: "Menace II Secret Society"
2012	2012 Soul Train Awards	Composer	Television special
2012–2021	Independent Lens	Himself	2 episodes
2013	The Eric Andre Show	Himself	Episode: "Chance the Rapper/Mel B"
2013	Top Chef	Himself - Guest Judge / Musician / Restaurateur	Episode: "Giving It the College Try"
2013	Say Yes to the Dress	Himself	Episode: "Apple of His Eye"
2014	Law & Order: Special Victims Unit	Corpse (uncredited)	Episode: "Criminal Stories"
2014	SoundClash	Executive producer	Episode: "Fall Out Boy, T.I. & London Grammar"
2014–2016	Inside Amy Schumer	Himself	3 episodes
2014–present	The Tonight Show Starring Jimmy Fallon	Himself	334 episodes
2015	Anthony Bourdain: Parts Unknown	Himself	Episode: "Miami"
2015	Empire	Himself (voice)	Episode: "Et Tu, Brute?"
2015	The Jim Gaffigan Show	Himself	Episode: "My Friend the Priest"
2015	Saturday Night Live	Himself	Episode: "J.K. Simmons/D'Angelo"
2015	Lucas Bros. Moving Co.	—N/a (voice)	2 episodes
2015	Parks and Recreation	LeVondrious Meagle	Episode: "Donna and Joe"
2016	Hamilton's America	Himself	Television film
2016	Night Train with Wyatt Cenac	Himself	Episode: "Sneaks & Geeks"
2016	Roots	—N/a	Executive music producer; Miniseries
2016	SPARKLE: A Don Quixote Story	—N/a	Producer; Miniseries
2016–2020	Drunk History	Himself	2 episodes
2017–2020	Finding Your Roots	Himself	2 episodes
2020	High Fidelity	—N/a	Executive music producer; 10 episodes
2021	Sesame Street: 50 Years of Sunny Days	Himself	Television special
2022	Billions	Himself	Episode: "Johnny Favorite"
2024	Abbott Elementary	Himself	Episode: "2 Ava 2 Fest"

== Written works ==
- Mo' Meta Blues (2013)
- Soul Train: The Music, Dance, and Style of a Generation (2013)
- Something To Food About (2016)
- Creative Quest (2018)
- Mixtape Potluck (2019)
- Music is History (2021)
- The Rhythm of Time (2023)
- Hip-Hop is History (2024)
- The Idea in You: A Picture Book (2024)

== Awards and nominations ==
=== Academy Awards ===
Year	Nominee / work	Award	Result
2022	Summer of Soul (...Or, When the Revolution Could Not Be Televised)	Best Documentary Feature Film	Won

=== Annie Awards ===
Year	Nominee / work	Award	Result
2023	Best TV/Media - Preschool	Rise Up, Sing Out - “Name Tag”	Nominated

=== BET Awards ===
Year	Nominee / work	Award	Result
2003	The Roots	Best Group	Nominated
2005	The Roots	Best Group	Nominated
2009	The Roots	Best Group	Nominated

=== BAFTAs ===
Year	Nominee / work	Award	Result
2022	Summer of Soul (...Or, When the Revolution Could Not Be Televised)	Best Documentary	Won

=== Grammy Awards ===
Year	Nominee / work	Award	Result
2000	"You Got Me" (with Erykah Badu)	Best Rap Performance by a Duo or Group	Won
2000	Things Fall Apart	Best Rap Album	Nominated
2004	Phrenology	Best Rap Album	Nominated
2005	"Star"	Best Urban/Alternative Performance	Nominated
2005	"Don't Say Nuthin'"	Best Rap Performance By a Duo/Group	Nominated
2007	"Don't Feel Right" (featuring Maimouna Youssef)	Best Rap Performance By a Duo/Group	Nominated
2007	Game Theory	Best Rap Album	Nominated
2011	"Hang On in There" (with John Legend)	Best Traditional R&B Vocal Performance	Won
2011	Wake Up! (with John Legend)	Best R&B Album	Won
2011	"Shine" (with John Legend)	Best R&B Performance by a Duo or Group with Vocals	Nominated
2011	"Wake Up Everybody" (with John Legend, Melanie Fiona & Common)	Best Rap/Sung Collaboration	Nominated
2011	How I Got Over	Best Rap Album	Nominated
2012	"Surrender" (with Betty Wright)	Best Traditional R&B Performance	Nominated
2012	The Road from Memphis	Best Pop Instrumental Album	Won
2013	Undun	Best Rap Album	Nominated
2016	Hamilton	Best Musical Theater Album	Won
2019	Creative Quest	Best Audio Book, Narration & Storytelling Recording	Nominated
2022	Summer of Soul (...Or, When the Revolution Could Not Be Televised)	Best Music Film	Won
2023	Music Is History	Best Audio Book, Narration & Storytelling Recording	Nominated

=== MTV Video Music Awards ===
Year	Nominee / work	Award	Result
2003	The Seed 2.0	MTV2 Award	Nominated

=== mtvU Woodie Awards ===
Year	Nominee / work	Award	Result
2004	The Roots	Road Woodie	Nominated
2004	The Roots	Welcome Back Woodie	Nominated

=== NAACP Image Awards ===
Year	Nominee / work	Award	Result
2003	The Roots	Outstanding Duo or Group	Nominated
2004	The Roots	Outstanding Duo or Group	Nominated
2005	The Roots	Outstanding Duo or Group	Nominated
2007	The Roots	Outstanding Duo or Group	Won
2011	Wake Up!	Outstanding Collaboration	Won
2011	Wake Up!	Outstanding Album	Won
2012	The Roots	Outstanding Duo or Group	Nominated

=== Primetime Emmy Awards ===
Year	Nominee / work	Award	Result
2025	Ladies & Gentlemen... 50 Years of SNL Music	Outstanding Directing For A Documentary/Nonfiction Program	Nominated
2025	SNL50: The Homecoming Concert	Outstanding Music Direction	Nominated
2025	Sly Lives! (aka The Burden of Black Genius)	Outstanding Documentary Or Nonfiction Special	Nominated

- First Hip-Hop group to perform at Lincoln Center, January 2002
- Named one of the "Twenty Greatest Live Acts in the World" by Rolling Stone, 2003
- "Heroes Award" from the Philadelphia chapter of the Recording Academy, 2004 (Recipient)

Media offices
Preceded by Max Weinberg	Late Night bandleader March 2, 2009 – February 7, 2014	Succeeded by Fred Armisen
Preceded by Rickey Minor	The Tonight Show bandleader February 17, 2014 – present	Succeeded by Incumbent
