= Aaron Levinson =

American record producer

- Born: Philadelphia, Pennsylvania, United States
- Genres: Soul music, Funk, Hip hop, Jazz, Salsa
- Occupations: Record label owner, producer, musician, educator, engineer, writer.
- Years active: 1997–present
- Labels: Bell Tower, EMI, Fania Records, Libertad, Rykodisc, Ropeadope Records, Spruce Hill Music

Aaron Levinson (born July 2, 1963) is a Grammy award-winning producer, musician, composer and record label owner. He has produced and released dozens of albums since starting his career with Inner City Records in 1981.

== Early life ==
Levinson was born in Philadelphia and is a graduate of the Philadelphia High School for the Creative and Performing Arts.

== Career ==
In 2003, Levinson co-composed and produced the score for the Cinemax documentary “How Do You Spell Murder?” directed by Oscar-winning directors Alan and Susan Raymond. His recent productions include Jeff Thomas' All Volunteer Army, El Malito and Rediscovering Lonnie Johnson. Levinson is an ASCAP-affiliated songwriter and publisher and has an international co-publishing agreement with Evergreen Music for his musical compositions in 43 countries around the world.

Levinson is the owner of Range Recording Studios in Ardmore, Pennsylvania and served previously as president of Bell Tower Music. He was an adjunct faculty member at Temple University from 2010 to 2016. From 2014 until 2019, he was an appointed master lecturer at the University of the Arts. He is a former governor of the Philadelphia chapter of the National Academy of Recording Arts and Sciences.

== Discography ==
- Latimer, Live from Sour City (World Domination, 1997) – live rec. 1996. producer.
- Tambo, Al Santiago Presents Tambo (Ryko Latino, 1997) – Reissue (1975) producer, liner notes
- Bongo-Logic, Tipiqueros (Ryko Latino, 1997) – reissue (1996) producer, liner notes
- Son de Loma, Regalo del Ciego (Blindman's Gift) (Ryko Latino, 1998) – reissue Y Sigue La Cosa... (1982) producer
- Jimmy Bosch, Soneando Trombon (Ryko Latino, 1998) – mixing, producer
- Somos 21 , Roberto Clemente: Un Tributo Musical (Tribute in Song) (Ryko Latino, 1998) – executive producer
- The Philadelphia Experiment, The Philadelphia Experiment (Ropeadope, 2001) – rec. 2000. handclapping, mixing, producer, sound effects
- Spanish Harlem Orchestra, Un Gran Dia en el Barrio (Ropeadope, 2002) – producer, recording director
- The Dirty Dozen Brass Band, Medicated Magic (Ropeadope, 2002) – liner notes
- The Detroit Experiment, The Detroit Experiment (Ropeadope, 2003) – audio production, clapping, producer
- Truco & Zaperoko, Musica Universal (Libertad, 2003) – executive producer, liner notes
- V.A., Lost Classics of Salsa, Vol. 1 (Libertad, 2003) – executive producer, reissue producer
- Spanish Harlem Orchestra, Across 110th Street (Libertad, 2004) – audio production, engineer, executive producer, mastering, mixing, producer
- Zaperoko, 3 (Libertad , 2005) – executive producer, mixing
- V.A., Lost Classics of Salsa, Vol. 2 (Libertad, 2005) – executive producer, reissue producer, remastering
- The Harlem Experiment, The Harlem Experiment (Ropeadope, 2007) – audio production, liner notes, mixing, producer
- Jose Conde Y Ola Fresca, (R)evolucion (Mr Bongo, 2007) – producer
- Harmonious Wail, Resist Temptation (Range, 2008) – audio engineer, audio production, liner notes, mixing, producer
- Blues Anatomy with special guest Jef Lee Johnson, Rediscovering Lonnie Johnson (Range, 2008) – producer
- Pulpo, Pulpo's Hot Bread (The Mambo Project, 2008) – production Consultant
- V.A., Baby Loves Salsa: for Kittens and Puppies (Baby Loves Music, 2008) – rec. 2007. producer.
- Harmonious Wail, The Vegan Zombie's Lament (Range, 2010) – mixing, producer

== Awards and honors ==
- 2005 Grammy Winner: Salsa Album of the Year
- 2004 Grammy Nominee: Salsa Album of the Year
- 2003 Grammy Nominee: Salsa Album of the Year
- 2003 Billboard Award Winner: New Salsa Artist of the Year
- 2001 Latin Grammy Award Nominee: Traditional Tropical Album
