= I'm Going to the West =

The folk music standard I'm going to the West is also known as Going to the West. It was collected by Alabama professor Byron Arnold from Janie Barnard Couch of Guntersville, Alabama in June or July 1947, and published in an Alabama songbook in 1950.

== Partial Discography ==
- Brown, Mason; and Chipper Thompson. Am I Born to Die. An Appalachian Songbook, Dorian Dor 83217 (1999)
- Dover, Connie. The Border of Heaven, (2000)
- Finest Kind. Lost in a Song, Fallen Angle, (2006)
- Hawker, Ginny; and Kay Justice. Pathway to West Virginia, Pathway, (1988)
- Lewis, Laurie, (2008)
- Seeger Family. Third Annual Farewell Reunion, Rounder 0313, (1994)
- Staines, Bill. Going to the West, Red House Records, (1993)
- Stecher, Jody; and Kate Brislin. Our Town, Rounder 0304, (1993)
- Watson, Jim. Don't Tell Me, I Don't Know, Barker 1218, (1999)
