= The Philadelphia Experiment (album) =

2001 studio album by the Philadelphia Experiment

Studio album by The Philadelphia Experiment
- Released: June 12, 2001
- Recorded: September 25–27, 2000
- Studio: The Studio, Philadelphia, Pennsylvania
- Genre: Jazz; funk
- Length: 52:43
- Label: Ropeadope Records
- Producer: Aaron Levinson; Andy Blackman Hurwitz

Experiment series chronology
| The Philadelphia Experiment (2001) | The Detroit Experiment (2003) |

Christian McBride chronology
| Sci-Fi (2000) | The Philadelphia Experiment (2001) | Vertical Vision (2003) |

Professional ratings
Review scores
| Source | Rating |
|---|---|
| All About Jazz | favorable |
| AllMusic | 4/5 stars |
| Now | 3/5 Ns |
| PopMatters | favorable |

The Philadelphia Experiment is a 2001 studio album by the Philadelphia Experiment, a collaborative project produced by Aaron Levinson including pianist Uri Caine, bassist Christian McBride, and drummer Ahmir "Questlove" Thompson. It features guest appearances from guitarist Pat Martino, trumpeter John Swana, and cellist Larry Gold. It peaked at number 7 on the Billboard Jazz Albums chart.

== Background ==
The album is the first entry in a series devoted to musicians from the same cities but different musical genres, the second being The Detroit Experiment (2003) and the third being The Harlem Experiment (2007). The title "The Philadelphia Experiment" describes the bringing together of Philadelphia-based musicians from differing backgrounds (Caine was known for working in classical and jazz; McBride in jazz; and Thompson in rap and R&B).

In 2002, King Britt released a remix album, titled The Philadelphia Experiment Remixed.

== Critical reception ==
David R. Adler of AllMusic gave the album 4 stars out of 5, calling it "a textbook example of how jazz, soul, and hip-hop were becoming deeply intertwined at the outset of the new millennium." Todd S. Jenkins of All About Jazz said, "Here, three tight homeboys have distilled the essence of the Philly legacy down into one insanely funky disc that commands repeat listenings."

== Track listing ==
| No. | Title | Writer(s) | Length |
|---|---|---|---|
| 1. | "Philadelphia Experiment" | Caine | 4:13 |
| 2. | "Grover" | Caine | 4:57 |
| 3. | "Lesson #4" | Caine, McBride, Questlove | 2:52 |
| 4. | "Call for All Demons" | Sun Ra | 5:26 |
| 5. | "Trouble Man Theme" | Marvin Gaye | 4:31 |
| 6. | "Ain't It the Truth" | Eddie Green | 5:04 |
| 7. | "IIe Ife" | Sherman Ferguson | 6:10 |
| 8. | "The Miles Hit" | Caine, McBride, Questlove | 5:45 |
| 9. | "(Re)Moved" | Caine, McBride | 2:09 |
| 10. | "Philadelphia Freedom" | Elton John, Bernie Taupin | 3:09 |
| 11. | "Mister Magic / Just the Two of Us" | Ralph MacDonald, William Salter | 8:31 |
| Total length: | | | 52:43 |

== Personnel ==
Credits adapted from liner notes.

- Uri Caine – electric piano, acoustic piano, organ
- Christian McBride – electric bass, acoustic bass
- Ahmir "Questlove" Thompson – drums
- Pat Martino – electric guitar (1, 2, 4)
- John Swana – trumpet (1, 5)
- Larry Gold – cello (10), arrangement (10)
- Aaron Levinson – handclap (2, 9), sound effect (2, 9), production
- Andy Blackman Hurwitz – executive production

== Charts ==
| Chart | Peak position |
|---|---|
| US Jazz Albums (Billboard) | 7 |
