= Sly Lives! (aka The Burden of Black Genius) =

2025 American documentary film

- Film poster
- Directed by: Questlove
- Produced by: Amit Dey; Joseph Patel; Derik Murray
- Edited by: Josh Pearson
- Production companies: Onyx Collective; RadicalMedia; MRC; Two One Five Entertainment; StarDust Films; Network Entertainment; ID8 Multimedia; Sony Music Entertainment
- Distributed by: Hulu
- Release dates: January 23, 2025 (Sundance); February 13, 2025
- Running time: 112 minutes
- Country: United States
- Language: English

Sly Lives! (aka The Burden of Black Genius) is a 2025 American documentary film, directed by Ahmir "Questlove" Thompson. It explores the life, career, and legacy of Sly and the Family Stone.

It had its world premiere at the Sundance Film Festival on January 23, 2025, and was released on February 13, 2025, on Hulu and Disney+.

== Premise ==
Explores the life, career, and legacy of Sly and the Family Stone. Andre 3000, D'Angelo, Chaka Khan, Q-Tip, Nile Rodgers, Jimmy Jam and Terry Lewis, Joel Selvin, George Clinton, Ruth Copeland, Dream Hampton, Mark Anthony Neal, and Clive Davis appear in the film.

== Production ==
In February 2021, it was announced Ahmir "Questlove" Thompson would direct a documentary revolving around Sly and the Family Stone with Common set to executive produce.

In the making of the film, some interviews from Greg Zola's Small Talk About Sly and Michael Rubinstone's On the Sly: In Search of the Family Stone were used.

In January 2023, Onyx Collective and Hulu acquired the film.

== Release ==
It had its world premiere at the Sundance Film Festival on January 23, 2025. It was released on February 13, 2025.

== Reception ==
=== Critical response ===
On the review aggregator website Rotten Tomatoes, 93% of 45 critics' reviews are positive. The website's consensus reads: "An affectionate celebration of Sly & the Family Stone that's all the more powerful for recognizing its subject's flaws, SLY LIVES! is a sterling sophomore documentary feature from Ahmir 'Questlove' Thompson." Metacritic, which uses a weighted average, assigned the film a score of 77 out of 100, based on 12 critics, indicating "generally favorable" reviews.

Robert Daniels of RogerEbert.com gave the film three and a half out of four stars and wrote, "Sly Lives! isn't as eye-opening as Summer of Soul (a difficult hill to climb). But it's still a clear cut above your standard hagiographic music documentary. This film sees Sly as a three-dimensional person whose brilliance should neither absolve nor condemn him. It marvels at his genius and mourns the evaporation of his hitmaking talent. It is as vibrant, colorful, and catchy as any Sly and the Family Stone chart-topper."

=== Accolades ===
Award	Year	Category	Recipient(s)	Result	Ref.
Critics' Choice Documentary Awards	2025	Best Music Documentary	Sly Lives! (aka the Burden of Black Genius)	Won	
Primetime Emmy Awards	2025	Outstanding Documentary or Nonfiction Special	Joseph Patel (produced by), Derik Murray (produced by), Amit Dey (executive producer), Questlove(executive producer), Zarah Zohlman (executive producer), Shawn Gee (executive producer)	Nominated	
International Documentary Association	2025	Best Music Documentary	Sly Lives! (aka the Burden of Black Genius)	Nominated	
IndieLisboa International Independent Film Festival	2025	Indiemusic Schweppes Award	Questlove	Nominated	
Black Reel Awards for Television	2025	Outstanding Documentary	Questlove	Nominated	
Portland Critics Association Awards	2025	Best Documentary Feature	Sly Lives! (aka the Burden of Black Genius)	Nominated	
Gotham TV Awards	2025	Outstanding Original Film, Broadcast, or Streaming	Questlove (director), Eric Maran (producer), Derik Murray (producer), Joseph Patel (producer), Stephen Sawchuk (producer)	Nominated	
NAACP Image Awards	2026	Outstanding Directing in a Documentary (Television or Motion Picture)	Questlove	Nominated	
Cinema Eye Honors Awards	2026	Outstanding Achievement in Broadcast Film	Questlove	Nominated	
Cinema Eye Honors Awards	2026	Outstanding Achievement in Broadcast Editing	Joshua L Pearson	Nominated	
