= The Harlem Experiment =

Studio album by The Harlem Experiment
- Released: October 30, 2007
- Studio: Brooklyn, New York
- Genre: Jazz, funk
- Length: 48:51
- Label: Ropeadope Records
- Producer: Aaron Levinson, Andy Blackman Hurwitz, Louis Marks

Experiment series chronology
The Detroit Experiment (2003)	The Harlem Experiment (2007)

Professional ratings
Review scores
Source	Rating
All About Jazz	4/5 stars
AllMusic	3.5/5 stars
Robert Christgau	3.5/5 stars

The Harlem Experiment is a 2007 studio album by The Harlem Experiment, produced by Aaron Levinson, it was a collaborative project including Carlos Alomar, Ruben Rodriguez, Steve Berrios, Eddie Martinez, Don Byron, and Steve Bernstein. It features guest appearances from DJ Arkive, James Hunter, Olu Dara, Taj Mahal, Mums, and Queen Esther.

It is the third entry in a series of albums, the first being The Philadelphia Experiment (2001) and the second being The Detroit Experiment (2003).

== Track listing ==
No.	Title	Length
1.	"Intro"	1:13
2.	"One for Jackie"	3:19
3.	"Rigor Mortis"	2:48
4.	"Reefer Man"	3:01
5.	"Harlem River Drive"	3:32
6.	"Bei Mir Bist du Schön"	3:47
7.	"Mums' Interlude"	0:48
8.	"It's Just Begun"	3:43
9.	"Mambo a la Savoy"	2:38
10.	"A Rose in Spanish Harlem"	2:34
11.	"One for Malcolm"	3:34
12.	"Lil' Bit"	3:37
13.	"Think"	4:41
14.	"A Rose in Spanish Harlem (Instrumental)"	4:04
15.	"Walking Through Harlem"	5:32

== Personnel ==
Credits adapted from liner notes.

- Carlos Alomar – guitar
- Ruben Rodriguez – acoustic bass, electric bass
- Steve Berrios – drums, percussion
- Eddie Martinez – electric piano, organ
- Don Byron – clarinet, tenor saxophone
- Steve Bernstein – trumpet
- DJ Arkive – scratches
- James Hunter – vocals, guitar
- Olu Dara – vocals, guitar
- Taj Mahal – vocals
- Mums – vocals
- Queen Esther – vocals
