= The Detroit Experiment =

Studio album by The Detroit Experiment
- Released: February 18, 2003
- Recorded: January 25 – September 2002
- Studio: White Room Detroit, Michigan
- Genre: Jazz, electronic
- Length: 64:12
- Label: Ropeadope Records
- Producer: Aaron Levinson and Carl Craig

Experiment series chronology
The Philadelphia Experiment (2001)	The Detroit Experiment (2003)	The Harlem Experiment (2007)

Singles from The Detroit Experiment
- 1. "The Way We Make Music" Released: 2002; 2. "Think Twice" Released: 2009

Professional ratings
Review scores
Source	Rating
AllMusic	3/5 stars
BBC	favorable

The Detroit Experiment is a 2003 studio album by The Detroit Experiment, a collaborative project including DJ/producer Aaron Levinson, saxophonist Bennie Maupin, trumpeter Marcus Belgrave, pianist Geri Allen, and violinist Regina Carter. It peaked at number 17 on the Billboard Jazz Albums chart, as well as number 24 on the Top Dance/Electronic Albums chart.

It is the second entry in a series of albums, the first being The Philadelphia Experiment (2001) and the third being The Harlem Experiment (2007).

== Track listing ==
No.	Title	Length
1.	"Space Odyssey"	5:25
2.	"Think Twice"	6:18
3.	"Revelation"	7:45
4.	"Baby Needs New Shoes"	4:38
5.	"There Is a God"	5:50
6.	"Church"	5:27
7.	"Enterluud"	2:32
8.	"Vernors"	4:03
9.	"Too High"	4:28
10.	"Highest"	3:35
11.	"Midnight at the Twenty Grand"	6:58
12.	"A Taste of Tribe"	0:15
13.	"The Way We Make Music"	3:38
14.	"Revelation Reprise"	3:20

== Charts ==
Chart	Peak position
US Jazz Albums (Billboard)	17
US Top Dance/Electronic Albums (Billboard)	24
