= Dandelion Wine (disambiguation) =

Dandelion Wine is a 1957 novel by Ray Bradbury, based on a 1953 short story, also by Bradbury, of the same title.

Dandelion Wine may also refer to:

- a type of fruit wine

== Entertainment ==
- Dandelion Wine (film), a 1997 Russian TV movie based on the novel
- Dandelion Wine (band), a musical trio based in Melbourne, Victoria, Australia
- "Dandelion Wine", a song by The Hollies from their 1970 album Confessions of the Mind
- "Dandelion Wine", a folk song performed by Makem and Clancy from their 1980 album The Makem & Clancy Collection
- "Dandelion Wine", a song by Blackmore's Night from their 2003 album Ghost of a Rose
- "Dandelion Wine", a song by Ron Sexsmith from his 2004 album Retriever
- "Dandelion Wine", a song by Gregory Alan Isakov from his 2009 album This Empty Northern Hemisphere
- "Dandelion Wine", a song by Thrice from their 2021 album Horizons/East
