= Priscilla Herdman =

American musician

- Born: February 11, 1948 (age 77); Eastchester, New York, United States
- Genres: Folk music
- Occupation(s): Singer-songwriter, musician
- Labels: Philo Records; Rounder Records; Flying Fish Records; Alcazam!; Redwing; Hearst and Hand

Priscilla Herdman (born February 11, 1948) is an American folk singer, whom The New York Times called "one of the clearest and most compelling voices of contemporary folk music." Although she has written songs, she is notable chiefly for her interpretations of other artists' work.

== Early life ==
Born in Eastchester, New York in 1948, she attended the University of Iowa, finishing her studies at the Fashion Institute of Technology in New York. While working in the fashion industry, she began to play in the coffeehouses of Greenwich Village and the church basements of the Upper West Side, and toured in Europe. In 1976, she moved to Philadelphia and decided to become a professional singer.

== Music career ==
Her first album, The Water Lily, was released in 1977, on the Philo label. In 1980, her second album, Forgotten Dreams, consisting mainly of covers of songs by contemporary North American songwriters, was released on the Flying Fish label. In 1982, Herdman left Philadelphia and moved to the small rural community of Pine Plains, New York, where she met her husband, Dick Hermans. In 1983 she then released her third album, Seasons of Change. To date, Herdman has released 12 albums, including several in a trio with Anne Hills and Cindy Mangsen.

== Discography ==
=== Studio albums ===
- 1977: The Water Lily (Philo)
- 1980: Forgotten Dreams (Flying Fish)
- 1983: Seasons Of Change (Flying Fish)
- 1987: Darkness Into Light (Flying Fish)
- 1988: Stardreamer: Nightsongs and Lullabies (Alacazam!)
- 1990: Voices (Flying Fish) - with Anne Hills and Cindy Mangsen
- 1993: Daydreamer (Music For Little People)
- 1995: Forever & Always (Flying Fish / New Rounder)
- 1997: Voices of Winter (Gadfly) - with Anne Hills and Cindy Mangsen
- 1998: Moondreamer (Redwing)
- 2000: At the Turning of the Year (Hand & Heart)
- 2003: The Road Home (Redwing)
- 2009: Into the Stars (Stardreamer)

=== As composer ===
- 1981: Martyn Wyndham-Read - Emu Plains (Fellside) - track 5, "Water Lily" (co-written with Henry Lawson)

=== Also appears on ===
- 1977: Jim Ringer - Tramps & Hawkers (Philo) - vocals
- 1981: Bill Staines - Rodeo Rose (Philo) - vocals
- 1983: Martin Curtis - Gin & Raspberry (Cityfolk) - vocals
- 1985: Fred Small - No Limit (Rounder) - vocals
- 1992: Cindy Mangsen - Songlines (Compass Rose) - vocals
- 1993: Allen Power - The Healing Arts (Beacon) - vocals
- 1993: various artists - Christine Lavin Presents: On a Winter's Night (Philo) - track 15, "Stars"
- 1994: Anne Hills and Cindy Mangsen - Never Grow Old (Flying Fish)
- 1995: Anne Hills - Angle of the Light (Flying Fish)
- 1996: Jay Ansill - A Lost World (Poems of Robert Graves Set as Songs) (Beacon) - vocals
- 1998: Anne Hills - Never Grow Up (Flying Fish)
- 1998: Cindy Mangsen - Songs of Experience (Redwing) - vocals
- 2009: Anne Hills - Points of View (Appleseed) - vocals

== Bibliography ==
- Michael Erlewine & Scott Bultman (ed.) (1992) All Music Guide, 1st ed., p. 509, ISBN 0-87930-264-X.
- Neal Walters & Brian Mansfield (ed.) (1998) MusicHound Folk: The Essential Album Guide, p. 360-361, ISBN 1-57859-037-X (the source of her birth date).
- Carlin, Richard (2007) American Popular Music: Folk, p. 94, ISBN 0-8160-7340-6.
