= Woods Tea Company =

American musical group from Vermont

Wood's Tea Company
- Group members of Wood's Tea Company

Background information
- Origin: Vermont
- Genres: Traditional folk
- Years active: 1981 — 2022
- Label: Independent
- Past members: Howard Wooden; Patti Casey; Mike Lussen; Chip Chase; Rusty Jacobs; Bruce Morgan; Tom MacKenzie; Pete Sutherland
- Website: woodstea.net

Woods Tea Company was an American folk music group based in Vermont. They performed a wide variety of traditional folk music from the New England and Anglo-Celtic traditions, including sea shanties, drinking songs, and instrumental fiddle tunes. The group was known for its energy, musical talent and dry sense of humor between songs.

== History ==
Woods Tea Company was started in 1981 in Burlington, Vermont, by Bruce Morgan and Rusty Jacobs. The band got its name from a wooden storage box owned by Jacobs that had "Woods Tea Co." printed on its side. Mike Lussen joined the band several years later.

Morgan left the band in the early 1990s. Howard Wooden officially joined the band in 1992, and Tom MacKenzie a year later. In 2000, MacKenzie left, and was replaced by Chip Chase.

The band became a regular feature at Colgate University, where the students knew the band's material. Between songs, students often shout 'Arrgh!' to poke fun at the group's sea shanties. To honor this, MacKenzie wrote a song called "Aargh!" for the students.

The band suffered several losses in its third decade. On October 6, 2006, Chase died from a massive pulmonary embolism. He had been hit by a pickup truck while riding his motorcycle several weeks earlier. A year later, on August 15, 2007, Jacobs died of a heart attack. On June 21, 2018, Mike Lussen died after a long illness.

Following the deaths, MacKenzie started touring with the group and eventually rejoined the band full-time. In late 2008, Patti Casey became the band's newest member. In June 2010, Lussen retired from the group. MacKenzie left the band again in fall 2013 and was replaced by Pete Sutherland.

Woods Tea Co. no longer performs, following the deaths of Mike Lussen in 2018 and Pete Sutherland in 2022.

== Members ==
- Howard Wooden - vocals, guitar, bass, bodhran
- Pete Sutherland - vocals, fiddle, mandolin, guitar, keyboard
- Patti Casey - vocals, guitar, penny whistle, flute, bodhran
- Tom MacKenzie - vocals, hammered dulcimer, guitar, banjo, keyboards, ukulele
- Mike Lussen - vocals, banjo, guitar, Irish bouzouki, bodhran
- Bruce Morgan - vocals, guitar, mandolin, concertina
- Chip Chase - vocals, fiddle, guitar, mandolin, banjo, bodhran
- Rusty Jacobs - vocals, guitar, tin whistle

== Discography ==
=== 1983 - Where Am I To Go? ===
1. Santy Anno
2. Wild Mountain Thyme
3. The Road To Boston
4. Where Am I To Go?
5. Panxty Fanny Poswers
6. Blow Ye Winds
7. Three Pounds Ten
8. The Blarney Pilgrim
9. The Irish Question
10. Sally In The Garden
11. No Mans Land
12. Summertime - The Rights Of Man

=== 1995 - Side By Each ===
1. Irish Rain
2. Lazy
3. Clam Flats / Oyster River / The Bridge / Mud Walk
4. Spotted Pony / Sugar Hill
5. She Was
6. Wayfaring Stranger
7. Roll the Old Chariot / Green Willis
8. Home Sweet Home
9. April Wood
10. Three Fishers
11. Petticoat Whalers / Nantucket Sleigh Ride
12. Chilly Winds
13. The Trip
14. Daughters and Sons

=== 1995 - Journey Home ===
1. Paddy's Green Shamrock Shore
2. Boyne Water
3. By The Hush
4. Roll Highway
5. Johnny Jump Up
6. Take Your Pay
7. Foolish Questions
8. Talcahuano Girls
9. Jenny-Lynne
10. Ghost of Gloucester's Fleet
11. Matthew 18:3
12. Mist Covered Mountains
13. Pull Down Your Vest
14. Goin' Away

=== 1999 - The Wood's Tea Co. - Live! ===
1. Daughters & Sons
2. The Wild Rover
3. Banks of Newfoundland
4. Wee Wee
5. Jenny Glenn
6. The Scotsman's Kilt
7. The Folker
8. 'Aargh!'
9. Here I Am
10. Blarney Pilgrim / Morpeth Rant
11. Roll the Old Chariots
12. The Dutchman
13. Foolish Questions
14. Alberta Bound
15. The Cat Came Back
16. Finnegan's Wake
17. Somewhere Over the Rainbow
18. There Were Roses
19. Sandy River Bell / Soldiers Joy

=== 2001 - This Side of the Sea ===
1. Haul Away Joe
2. St. Patrick's Day in America
3. The Fireman
4. Unst Wedding March
5. The High Cost of Living
6. This Side of the Sea
7. The Morning Comes Early
8. Farewell
9. The Bullgine
10. She Loves the Rain
11. Little Birdie
12. Ode to New Jersey
13. Planxty Fanny Powers
14. Bedford Harbor
15. Lift & Tow

=== 2003 - Standing Room Only ===
1. Lonesome Traveller
2. The Country Life
3. Morning on the Clam Flats / Oyster River
4. Girl of My Dreams
5. Inspirational Moment
6. RH Intro
7. Robin Hood (written by first-graders in Burlington, Vermont)
8. Olympic Audience Judging
9. Lament for Henriette / St. Anne's Reel / Soldier's Joy
10. Sweet Appreciation
11. 18 Again
12. Where Am I To Go
13. Santuario
14. Rock / O'Keef's Slide / Lord of The Dance
15. The Schooner I'm Alone
16. Don't Pet the Dog
17. Give Me Just a Little More Time
18. This Land is Your Land
19. Speed The Plow / Mason's Apron / Devil's Dream
20. Rolling Home

=== 2003 - An Evening With Woods Tea Company (DVD) ===
- Was aired on PBS a number of times.

=== 2007 - The Passage ===
1. The Passage / Whistle Jump
2. All The Hard Days Are Gone
3. December's Child
4. Sink The Cheerio
5. My Monday
6. Before They Close The Minstrel Show
7. The Coal Town Road
8. Lovell the Robber
9. The Old Dun Cow
10. For Rusty
11. Reuben James
12. Round The Bend
13. Gin Ye Marry Me or Birnie Bouzle
14. On Board the Saratoga
15. God Rest Ye Merry Gentlemen / O'Carolyn Tune
16. The Waterfall

=== 2009 - A Lively Evening with The Woods Tea Co. ===
This album was released on February 20, 2009, as a DVD and CD combo.

1. Where Am I To Go?
2. The Old Dun Cow / Star of Munster / Temperance Reel
3. The Remember Song
4. Down From Canada
5. The Wild Rover
6. Glencoe Schottische / Lord Of The Dance
7. Little Birdie
8. Sink The Cheerio
9. Ghost Of Pekin Brook
10. The High Cost of Living
11. Handsome Patrick
12. Sandy River Belle / Soldier's Joy
13. Old Man
14. This Little Light Of Mine
15. Rolling Home
16. Patti's Dance

=== 2010 - 10 For 10 ===
This album was released at various times during 2010 for $10, and it has 10 songs on it, hence the name. It is the first CD released without Mike Lussen.

1. Star of the County Down
2. The Silver Caravan
3. Give Me Just a Little More Time
4. Gander In the Stubble
5. Ste Joseph / Girl With the Blue Dress/Ste Antoine
6. Spotted Pony / Sugar Hill
7. Into This Night
8. Old Woman / Ten Penny Bit
9. The Grey Funnel Line
10. The Dog's Complaint
