= J. D. Walter =

American jazz vocalist (born 1967)

- Born: July 2, 1967 (age 59); Abington Township, Montgomery County, Pennsylvania, U.S.
- Genre: Jazz
- Occupation: Vocalist
- Years active: 2000–present
- Labels: Dreambox; Double-Time; Pact; Jwal; Arkadia
- Education: University of North Texas; Conservatorium van Amsterdam
- Website: www.jdwalter.com

J. D. Walter (born July 2, 1967, in Abington, Pennsylvania) is a jazz vocalist.

== Career ==
Walter grew up in Lebanon, Pennsylvania. Beginning in 1985, he studied jazz vocals at the University of North Texas, then at the Conservatory for the Arts in Amsterdam, Netherlands. In the 2000s, he taught at the University of the Arts in Philadelphia.

He released his debut solo album in 2000. The DownBeat review of his album One Step Away stated that Walter had "built a reputation for going down his own idiosyncratic path, while simultaneously crafting music that's at once accessible and adventuresome, and undeniably soulful." That album was recorded with guitarist Marvin Sewell, pianist Orrin Evans, bassist Eric Revis, and drummer Nasheet Waits.

== Discography ==
- Sirens in the C-House (Dreambox / Ear, 2000)
- Clear Day (Double-Time, 2001) – with Dave Liebman
- Dedicated to You (Pact, 2004) – with the Steve Rudolph Trio
- 2 Bass, a Face and a Little Skin (Dreambox, 2004)
- Live at the 55 Bar (Jwal / 55bar, 2009)
- Live in Portugal, Set 1 (Jwal, 2009)
- One Step Away (Jwal, 2013)
- Dressed in a Song (Jwal, 2020)
- White Christmas with JD Walter (Arkadia, 2022)[EP]
- Live in Portugal, Set 2 (Arkadia, 2023)
- What the World Needs Now (Arkadia, 2023)
- The Last Muse (Arkadia, 2023)
- Holiday Sleigh Ride (2024)
- Without a Net (Arkadia, 2025)
