= Bongo-Logic =

Bongo Logic is an American charanga founded in Los Angeles in 1987 under the leadership of timbalero Brett Gollin. Other personnel include flautist Art Webb, violinist Harry Scorzo, bassist Guillermo Guzmán, güiro player Johnny Crespo, conga player Michito Sánchez, keyboardist John Douglas and pianist Joe Rotondi. They have recorded for Rhythm Safari and Montuno Records, respectively. The original members have changed since they first began, and include newer members like Alfredo Ortiz, John Fumo, Claude Caillet, and many others.

== Discography ==
- Cha Cha Charanga (Rocky Peak, 1987)
- ¡Despierta! (Rhythm Safari/Priority, 1991)
- Bongo-Licious (Montuno Records, 1993)
- Tipiqueros (Montuno Records, 1996)
- Charanga-rama (Montuno Records, 1999)
