= Norm Hacking =

- Born: August 1, 1950
- Origin: Scarborough, Ontario, Canada
- Died: November 25, 2007 (aged 57)
- Genres: Folk music, spoken word
- Occupations: Singer-songwriter, musician, poet, author, columnist
- Instrument: Guitar
- Years active: 1976–2007
- Website: www.normhacking.com

Norm Hacking (August 1, 1950 – November 25, 2007) was a Canadian folk music singer-songwriter.

== Early life ==
Hacking spent his first six years living in a house that used to be owned by his grandparents, in the Gerrard Street and Victoria Park Avenue area of Scarborough, Ontario. When he was six his family "moved out to 'Scarberia'," he would jokingly say. Hacking described most of Scarborough at that time as a "sea of mud". "There was nothing but pollywogs and field mice and there was even a chicken farm on the corner of Kennedy and Lawrence."

Of his father, Hacking said "My old man was AWOL pretty early in life. He left when I was six." He described his mother Kathy as a "saint".

== Musical career ==
After attending Winston Churchill Collegiate Institute, Hacking started performing while a student at Scarborough College at the University of Toronto, where he graduated as an English major. His career as a musician began when a representative from the student council, who had heard him play, asked him to perform at a concert. "I said, 'You're crazy, are you out of your mind.' And he said '50 bucks, six songs...' You got me. I got up and nobody threw anything. In fact, several women who wouldn't normally speak to me came up after the gig and were cluttering about how they liked the music. And I said, 'Wow, this is good.'"

He then accepted an invitation to play the pub two weeks later, which he did with a lead guitar accompanist. "By the end of the night you couldn't hear yourself playing, it was so loud. And the table in front of the stage, they had been playing euchre all night and screaming and yelling, and they all got up in unison and mooned the stage. I said, 'OK, so that's how it is'."

Hacking would eventually become a regular at various establishments in Toronto. The recordings of early performances in 1976 and 1977 became his first solo album, Norm Hacking Live (1977).

Critically acclaimed albums Cut Roses (1980) and Stubborn Ghost (1988) followed, and led to many festival and concert appearances. A video of the song "Sammy", from the album Cut Roses, aired on The Nashville Network. Upon becoming the single caregiving parent to his young son Ben, however, he cut back on touring.

In 1996, with his son now a teen, Hacking released a greatest hits album with four new songs, Skysongs... A Writer's Collection, and returned to more active performing. In 1996, and again in 1997, he was artistic director of the Caledon Folk Festival.

A group of Canadian and American songwriters recorded 18 of his songs for a tribute album, One Voice: A Tribute to Norm Hacking, Vol. 1, in 2001. Wayne Marshall of Three Flamingos Music initiated the project. The performers on the album included Michael Peter Smith, Alan Rhody, Mikel Miller, Roger James, Nancy White, Chris Whiteley, Ron Nigrini, Jory Nash, Slowpoke, Jason Fowler and many others.

Hacking released I Am The Night, a collection of 33 original spoken word selections – poetry, prose, and lyrics – in 2005. Richard Christy, of the Kingston Whig-Standard, described each piece as "a very real slice of life. They are easy to relate to yet are neither simple nor boring... Hacking, like John Steinbeck, understands the depths of very simple situations and the simplicity of very complicated events."

On October 4, 2006, Hacking's mother Kathy died, with Norm at her side. He had spent most of his time since July with her at Scarborough Grace Hospital. Her death came as a profound emotional blow to Hacking, whose health deteriorated noticeably in the last few months, friends said.

Along with performing, in 1992 Hacking started writing a column, Racetrack Hack, for Taxinews, a monthly publication for and about Toronto's taxi industry.

== Death ==
A chronic leg infection limited his mobility in his final years. Norm Hacking died in his sleep from an apparent heart attack in his home on the night of November 25, 2007. "What I admired most about Norm and his songs are their realness, their honesty," said Chris Whiteley. "He made no excuses and his songs were those of a hopeless romantic. His best work was filled with a sense of wonder, and I hope those songs will be around for a long time for others to sing."

== Discography ==
- 1977: Norm Hacking Live
- 1980: Cut Roses
- 1988: Stubborn Ghost
- 1993: A Day in the Studio
- 1996: Skysongs: A Writer's Collection
- 1999: The Ache
- 2003: Orange Cats Make the Very Best Friends (with Kirk Elliot)
- 2005: I Am The Night
- 2005: When Cats Go Wrong (with Cynthia Nugent; includes book ISBN 1-55192-917-1, publisher: Raincoast Books)
