= Anne Hills =

American folk singer-songwriter (born 1953)

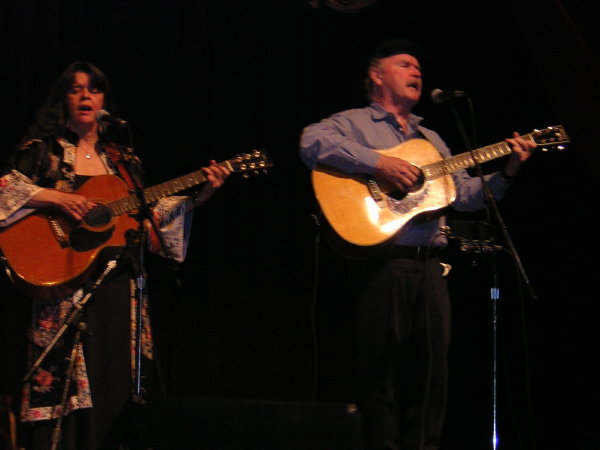
- Anne Hills and Tom Paxton performing in Nelsonville, Ohio, on May 15, 2005.

Background information
- Born: Anne E. Hills; October 18, 1953 (age 72); Moradabad, India
- Genres: Folk
- Occupations: Singer-songwriter, actor
- Instruments: Vocals, guitar, banjo, autoharp
- Years active: 1967–present
- Labels: Flying Fish, Hogeye, Appleseed
- Website: Official Website

Anne Hills (born October 18, 1953) is an American folk singer-songwriter who lives in Bethlehem, Pennsylvania.

== Biography ==
Hills was born to a family of missionaries in Moradabad, India, and grew up in Michigan in the United States.

A member of her church choir as a child, she became involved in community theater when she was still in elementary school. A student at the Interlochen Center for the Arts, she played in a band there with Chris Brubeck and Peter Erskine. By high school, she was singing classical, jazz and popular music.

In 1976, she moved to Chicago and was a co-founder of the record label Hogeye Music. After releasing a few records on Hogeye, the label was bought out by Flying Fish Records in the mid-1980s.

In 1984, Hills was briefly a member of a trio (along with Tom Paxton and Bob Gibson) known as the Best of Friends. In 1988, she began collaborating with Cindy Mangsen, with whom she released two duo albums. Together with Priscilla Herdman the three singers recorded as a trio in 1990 and again in 1997. In 1998, she contributed renditions to tribute albums for Pete Seeger and Phil Ochs.

The 2000s saw her collaborating with Tom Paxton and singing in a fourpiece called Fourtold with Steve Gillette, Mangsen, and Michael Peter Smith. Hills was awarded the Kate Wolf Memorial Award by the World Folk Music Association in 2002.

In addition to her musical endeavors, Hills also acts on the live stage. Additionally, she collaborated with Liz Paxson on a children's book with an accompanying album, featuring Hills and her daughter, Tamlyn. She lives in Bethlehem, Pennsylvania, and is married to Mark Moss, editor of Sing Out!.

== Discography ==
- Woman of a Calm Heart (1978)
- The Panic is On (with Jan Burda) (Hogeye, 1982)
- Don't Explain (Hogeye, 1984)
- On This Day Earth Shall Sing (Hogeye, 1984)
- Woman of a Calm Heart (Flying Fish Records, 1988)
- October Child (Flying Fish, 1993)
- Angle of the Light (Flying Fish, 1995)
- Bittersweet Street (Redwing Music, 1998)
- Paradise Lost & Found (with Michael Peter Smith) (Redwing, 1999)
- Under American Skies (with Tom Paxton) (2001)
- Fourtold (with Steve Gillette, Cindy Mangsen, and Michael Peter Smith) (2003)
- Best of Friends (with Tom Paxton and Bob Gibson) (2004)
- Beauty Attends: The Heartsongs of Opal Whiteley (2006)
- Ef You Don't Watch Out (2007)
- Points of View (2009)
- Rhubarb Trees (with David Roth) (2011)
- The Things I Notice Now: Anne Hills Sings the Songs of Tom Paxton (2012)
- Tracks (2014)
- Fragile Gifts (with Jay Ansill) (2016)
- Accidental August (2021)

With Cindy Mangsen

- Never Grow Old (1994)
- Never Grow Up (1998)

With Cindy Mangsen and Priscilla Herdman

- Voices (1990)
- Voices of Winter (1997)
- At the Turning of the Year (2000)
