= Makem and Clancy =

Irish folk duo

- Also known as: Tommy Makem & Liam Clancy
- Origin: County Tipperary, Ireland and County Armagh, Northern Ireland
- Genres: Traditional Irish, Folk, Celtic
- Years active: 1975–1988
- Labels: Blackbird Records, Shanachie Records
- Past members: Tommy Makem; Liam Clancy

Makem and Clancy was an Irish folk duo popular in the 1970s and 1980s. The group consisted of Tommy Makem and Liam Clancy, who had originally achieved fame as a part of the trailblazing folk group The Clancy Brothers and Tommy Makem in the 1960s. Makem and Clancy sang a combination of traditional Irish music, folks songs from a variety of countries, and newly written pieces, including compositions that Tommy Makem himself wrote. One reporter described their music as "more polished and varied than that used by the Clancy Brothers."

Although best known for their albums, concerts, and television programs, Makem and Clancy had three top ten singles in Ireland, including the number one hit, "And the Band Played Waltzing Matilda." Upon Liam Clancy's death in 2009, Irish broadcaster and writer Shay Healy noted about the group: "America had Elvis, Britain had The Beatles—Ireland had Makem and Clancy."

== Background ==
After initially achieving fame with The Clancy Brothers, Tommy Makem began a solo career in 1969. After Makem's departure, the Clancy Brothers began scaling back their busy touring schedule to the point that, by the mid-'70s, they were touring only part of the year. When not touring with his brothers, Liam Clancy started performing solo. In late 1974, suffering financial setbacks because of misreported taxes, Clancy filed for bankruptcy and moved his family to live with his in-laws in Calgary, Alberta, Canada. Clancy's brother-in-law, Leo Cote, began producing a series of successful local solo gigs for him. Clancy's concerts in Calgary caught the attention of a television producer, who signed him for thirteen episodes of his own syndicated music and talk show for the Spring season of 1975. The show was a hit and was renewed for twenty-six more episodes for the 1975–1976 season. He also released his first solo album in ten years, Farewell to Tarwathie, notable for his first recording of "The Dutchman".

At the same time, Makem was also achieving success in releasing seven solo albums, sold-out concerts, and television appearances, including a Canadian television series of his own.

Makem and Clancy both performed as solo acts at the Cleveland Irish Festival in July 1975. According to interviews, the two of them had to keep meeting with each other to make sure the other did not sing the same songs at each other's separate gigs. They decided to team up for a one-time performance together at the festival. Their pairing was successful, and they received an enthusiastic standing ovation from the audience. Soon after, Clancy invited Makem onto his Canadian television series, "The Liam Clancy Show". On the final show of the season, Makem appeared as a guest; this hit episode, which won an Emmy Award for Best Half-hour Entertainment in a Variety Show, led to the two of them being signed together for twenty-six additional episodes on television in the 1976–1977 season. Their series was called "The Makem & Clancy Show".

== Recordings and appearances ==
In February 1976, Makem and Clancy announced that they were joining forces and embarked on a tour of Canada. The following May, they began production on their television series in Calgary. Clancy toured with the Clancy Brothers at least one last time in March 1976 before officially leaving the group and joining Makem full-time.

In the autumn of 1976, the television series premiered. During the run of their show, they invited Scottish folk singer Archie Fisher to appear as a guest performer on an episode. Fisher told Makem and Clancy he wanted to produce a record with them. Makem and Clancy agreed and, with Fisher, produced their debut self-titled album, Tommy Makem & Liam Clancy, released in December 1976 on their own record label, Blackbird Records. Three of their subsequent albums were released on their label. The self-titled album included all-new songs they had not recorded before, including Makem's own compositions Windmills and Gordon Bok's "Hills of Isle Au Haut". The last-minute addition of the anti-war song, And the Band Played Waltzing Matilda, added to the album's success. The song quickly became Clancy's signature piece and reached the number one spot on the Irish music charts.

With Maurice Cassidy as their international manager and Makem's wife Mary Makem as their manager in the United States, the duo began touring full-time, performing at all the major venues and festivals in North America, Ireland, the UK, Australia, and appearing on all the major talk shows outside the U.S. as well as their own television specials. Usually, they would tour the British Isles in January and February, and for six weeks in June, July and August; Australia in May; North America in March and in the autumn.

Over the course of their thirteen-year career, they regularly toured with two backup musicians. In the 1970s and early 1980s, they were usually Archie Fisher, who produced their first three albums, on acoustic and bass guitar, and Allan Barty on fiddle and mandolin. Later on from approximately 1984 to the farewell tour in 1988, husband and wife duo Arty McGlynn on guitar and Nollaig Casey on fiddle replaced Barty and Fisher. Reportedly, Donal Lunny joined McGlynn and Casey for a time after he produced Makem and Clancy's final record in 1986. He played bouzouki.

Makem and Clancy followed their debut studio album with a live record recorded at the Gaiety Theater in Dublin in July 1977, the double LP The Makem & Clancy Concert. The record introduced many songs that were to become staples in their repertoire, including another of their signature numbers, Gordon Bok's story-song, "Peter Kagan and the Wind", as well as "Mary Mack", "Rambles of Spring", the Irish language song "Ar Éirinn Ní Neosainn Cé Hí", and "The Town of Ballybay".

In the autumn of 1977, they brought their old television show from Canada to PBS in the United States and filmed thirteen new episodes for New Hampshire PBS. Copies of the series were donated by Makem to the Ward Irish Music Archives before he died. They also filmed at least two television specials in 1977, one in Dublin in February, the other in San Francisco in December. At some point in late 1977, early 1978, Clancy moved from Calgary to Dover, New Hampshire, the same town where Makem resided.

In 1978, they hired nearly a dozen backup musicians to help record their next effort, a studio album called Two for the Early Dew. The album featured mostly ballads such as the now classic "Red is the Rose", "Dawning of the Day", "Grey October Clouds", "Clear Away in the Morning", and "Journey's End"; the last of which became their standard closing song. Fast, up-tempo songs included the Irish language "Cruiscin Lan", previously recorded by the Clancy Brothers mostly in English. The opening song "Day of the Clipper" came from the group Schooner Fare, whom Makem and Clancy had recently seen in concert. When Schooner Fare saw Makem and Clancy in the audience, they immediately changed their entire repertoire into Clancy and Makem songs, except for one song, "Day of the Clipper". After the show, Makem and Clancy told the group they were a bit disappointed they sang stuff they knew, but they asked, "What was that other song?" They loved it so much, it was used as their opening number.

Two songs from the album, "Red is the Rose" and "Morning Glory", became top ten hits in Ireland in 1979. The former, on which Clancy sang the lead, rose to the third spot on the singles chart. Later in the year, "Morning Glory" reached the seventh position on the same chart. The title of the album was taken from a line in the chorus of this song: "One for the morning glory, two for the early dew, three for the man who will stand his round, and four for the love of you".

During the late 1970s and early 1980s, they recorded several singles such as Pete Seeger's Rainbow Race, studio versions of The Dutchman, Dandelion Wine and The Town of Ballybay, as well as new material including Kitty from Baltimore, A Place in the Choir, Willie McBride, The Ballad of St Anne's Reel, The Garden Song, and Gentle Annie; some of these singles appeared on their compilation album, The Makem & Clancy Collection in 1980. TV specials such as an on location show called "The Music Makers" followed, as well as numerous guest appearances on Canada's The Irish Rovers television series.

Sometime around 1982, their first four albums and some of their solo albums were re-released on the Shanachie Records label. On the Shanachie label, Clancy's solo album, Farewell to Tarwaithie was re-titled The Dutchman to capitalize on the song's fame under Makem and Clancy, with a new album cover and track order. One of Makem's albums, Listen, for the Rafters are Singing, was also re-released with a new title and album cover. Their subsequent albums together, with the exception of We've Come a Long Way, and Makem's future solo albums would originally be released on the Shanachie label.

In 1983, Makem and Clancy recorded their fifth album, Live at the National Concert Hall. The album was recorded on February 6, 1983, at Dublin's National Concert Hall, and included an acclaimed rendition of Makem's "Four Green Fields". The concert was also filmed for Irish television and PBS in the United States, and included several songs not included on the album, such as "Rainbow Race" and the story-song "The Children of Michael", similar to their earlier hit "Peter Kagan and the Wind". "Little Beggarman" from this album features a wooden dancing marionette man manipulated by Clancy to dance to the beat of the song. This version of the song reportedly received much airtime on radio. The album is the only Makem and Clancy record released solely on the Shanachie label.

== Break-up ==
In 1984, after living in Dover, New Hampshire for a number of years, Clancy moved to Ireland with his family, purchasing several acres of land and building a maintenance-free solar powered, slate, stone and oak mansion in Helvic, County Waterford, using royalties from his hit song, And the Band Played Waltzing Matilda.

After a partial hiatus when they rejoined The Clancy Brothers for several tours in 1984 and 1985, Makem and Clancy resumed their full-time touring schedule as a duo, and returned to the recording studio in 1986 to produce their final album together, We've Come a Long Way. Produced by Planxty's Donal Lunny, the record was more of a contemporary pop album than a traditional Irish music album, using synthesizers and keyboards in addition to traditional Irish musical instruments. According to Clancy's daughter, Siobhan, the album, due to its contemporary feel, attracted the attention of Columbia Records, Makem's and Clancy's former employer and a new record contract was in the offering. Clancy was willing to sign, but Makem, remembering their hectic schedule in the 1960s, was not.

In 1988, Makem and Clancy announced they were amicably breaking up after thirteen years together. Newspapers reported that they didn't wish to overstay their welcome or let their material begin to go stale. Makem noted at the time that this was a "mutual decision" and that the two men remained friends.

They embarked on a farewell tour in Ireland and the UK in January and February, and finally in the United States in March 1988. Their final concert was at Stonehill College in Easton, Massachusetts, on March 26, 1988.

Both Clancy and Makem resumed the solo careers they had begun before reuniting in 1975.

Makem continued to perform solo for the rest of his life, releasing half a dozen solo albums and filming nearly a dozen PBS television concert specials and travelogues. Clancy filmed two of his solo concerts for Irish and American television in 1989, one of which was released on home video. His solo career was put on hold in 1990 when he rejoined the Clancy Brothers after brother Tom's death. After leaving the Clancy Brothers in 1996, he toured with his nephew Robbie O'Connell and son Donal until 1999, after which he resumed his solo career until the end of his life. He released a solo CD in 2008 and two videos, a concert special and a documentary on his life, in 2009.

Tommy Makem died of lung cancer in August 2007. Liam Clancy died of pulmonary fibrosis in December 2009.

== Discography ==
=== Albums ===
- Tommy Makem and Liam Clancy (1976) Blackbird BLB 1001; Shanachie 52002 (1982)

Side One

1. Windmills

2. Move Along

3. Fadh Mo Buartha

4. Hares on the Mountain

5. The Hills of Isle Au Haut

Side Two

6. The Town of Rostrevor

7. Bread and Fishes

8. The Sally Gardens

9. Maggie Pickens

10. The Band Played Waltzing Matilda

- The Makem & Clancy Concert (1977) Blackbird BLB 1002; Shanachie 52003 (1982)

Side One

1. Rambles Of Spring

2. In The Town Of Ballybay

3. The Dutchman

4. Sound The Pibroch

5. The Cobbler

Side Two

6. The 200 Year Old Alcoholic

7. The Mermaid

8. Peter Kagan and the Wind

Side Three

9. The Rocky Road To Dublin

10. Mary Mack

11. Botany Bay

12. And The Band Played Waltzing Matilda

Side Four

13. O'Donnell Abu

14. Ar Éirinn Ní Neosainn Cé Hí

15. My Father Loves Nikita Khrushchev

16. Leave Her Johnny

Shanachie compact disc version only - alternate track order, excludes Peter Kagan and the Wind to fit the 80 minute CD storage limit.

1. Rambles of Spring

2. Town of Ballbay

3. The Dutchman

4. The Mermaid

5. Botany bay

6. Mary Mack

7. And the Band Played Waltzing Matilda

8. O'Donnell Abu

9. Ar Éirinn Ní Neosainn Cé Hí

10. My Father Loves Nikita Khrushchev

11. Sound the Pibroch

12. The Cobbler

13. The 200 Year Old Alcoholic

14. Rocky Road to Dublin

15. Leave Her Johnny

- Two for the Early Dew (1978) Blackbird BLB 1007; Shanachie 52004 (1982)

Side One

1. The Day Of The Clipper

2. The Dawning Of The Day

3. Cruiscin Lan

4. White Swans And Black/Grey October Clouds

5. Red Is The Rose

Side Two

6. Bower Mowden

7. The Cocky Farmer

8. Morning Glory

9. Clear Away In The Morning

10. The Newry Highwayman

11. Journey's End

- The Makem and Clancy Collection (1980) Blackbird BLB 1009; Shanachie 52001 (1982)

- contains previously released material and singles

Side One

1. A Place In The Choir

2. The Cobbler

3. The Dutchman

4. The Garden Song

5. Willie McBride

6. Morning Glory

7. Four Green Fields

Side Two

8. Ballad Of St. Anne's Reel

9. Red Is The Rose

10. Gentle Annie

11. Ar Éirinn Ní Neosainn Cé Hí

12. Town Of Ballybay

13. The Band Played Waltzing Matilda

14. Rambles Of Spring

- Live at the National Concert Hall (1983) Shanachie 52006 (the only Makem and Clancy album originally released on Shanachie Records and RTE)

Side One

1. Wish I Was A Hunting

2. Bonnie Highland Laddie

3. Sliabh Gallion Braes

4. Galway Races

5. The Liar

6. Dandelion Wine

Side Two

7. Summer Roads

8. Little Beggarman

9. The Orchard

10. Whatever You Say, Say Nothing

11. Four Green Fields

12. Journey's End

- We've Come A Long Way (1986) Philips 830533–1; Shanachie 52013 (1986)

Side 1

1. We've Come a Long Way

2. Frog in the Well

3. Roseville Fair

4. Drill Ye, Tarriers, Drill

5. The Coast of Malabar

6. Queen of Connemara

Side 2

7. The Highwayman

8. Fair and Tender Ladies

9. Peg Leg Jack

10. Parcel of Rogues

11. Fagfaidh Mise An Baile Se

12. Golden

13. Mary Ellen Carter

Shanachie Records version (different track order and album cover)

Side One

1. We've Come A Long Way

2. Frog In The Well

3. Roseville Fair

4. The Queen Of Connemara

5. Peg Leg Jack

6. The Mary Ellen Carter (Stan Rogers)

7. Fair And Tender Ladies

Side Two

8. The Coast Of Malabar

9. The Highwayman

10. Fagfaidh Mise An Baile Se

11. Parcel Of Rogues

12. Drill Ye Tarriers, Drill

13. Golden

=== Single releases ===
- The Band Played Waltzing Matilda* & Town Of Rostrevor/Maggie Pickens: 1976 - BB 101 — IRE #1, AUS #92
- The Town Of Ballybay (studio version) & Kitty From Baltimore: 1977 - BB 103
- The Dutchman (studio version) & The Lowland Sea: 1977 - BB 104
- Red Is The Rose* & Bower Madden: 1979 - BB 106 — *#3 in The Irish Charts ...
- Morning Glory* & Cruiscin Lan: 1979 - BB 107 — *#7 in The Irish Charts ...
- The Garden Song** & The Tombstone: 1980 - BB 108
- A Place In The Choir** & Sliabh Gheal Gua Na Feile: 1980 - BB 111
- Ballad of St. Anne's Reel** / Sliabh Galleon Braes (studio version): 1980 - BB 112
- Willie McBride** & Gentle Annie** : 1980 - BB 113
- Waltzing Matilda & Red is the Rose: 1981 - BB 114
- Rainbow Race (studio version) & Dear Dark Eyes: 1981 - BB 116
- We Are The Boat & Dandelion Wine (studio version): 1985 - BB 127
- Bridie Murphy and The Kamikaize Pilot (live track) & The Newry Highwayman: 1985 - BB 128
- Four Green Fields** & New Mary Ellen Carter: 1986 - Rego 802

**appeared on The Makem and Clancy Collection (1980).
