= Pete Sutherland =

American folk musician (1951–2022)

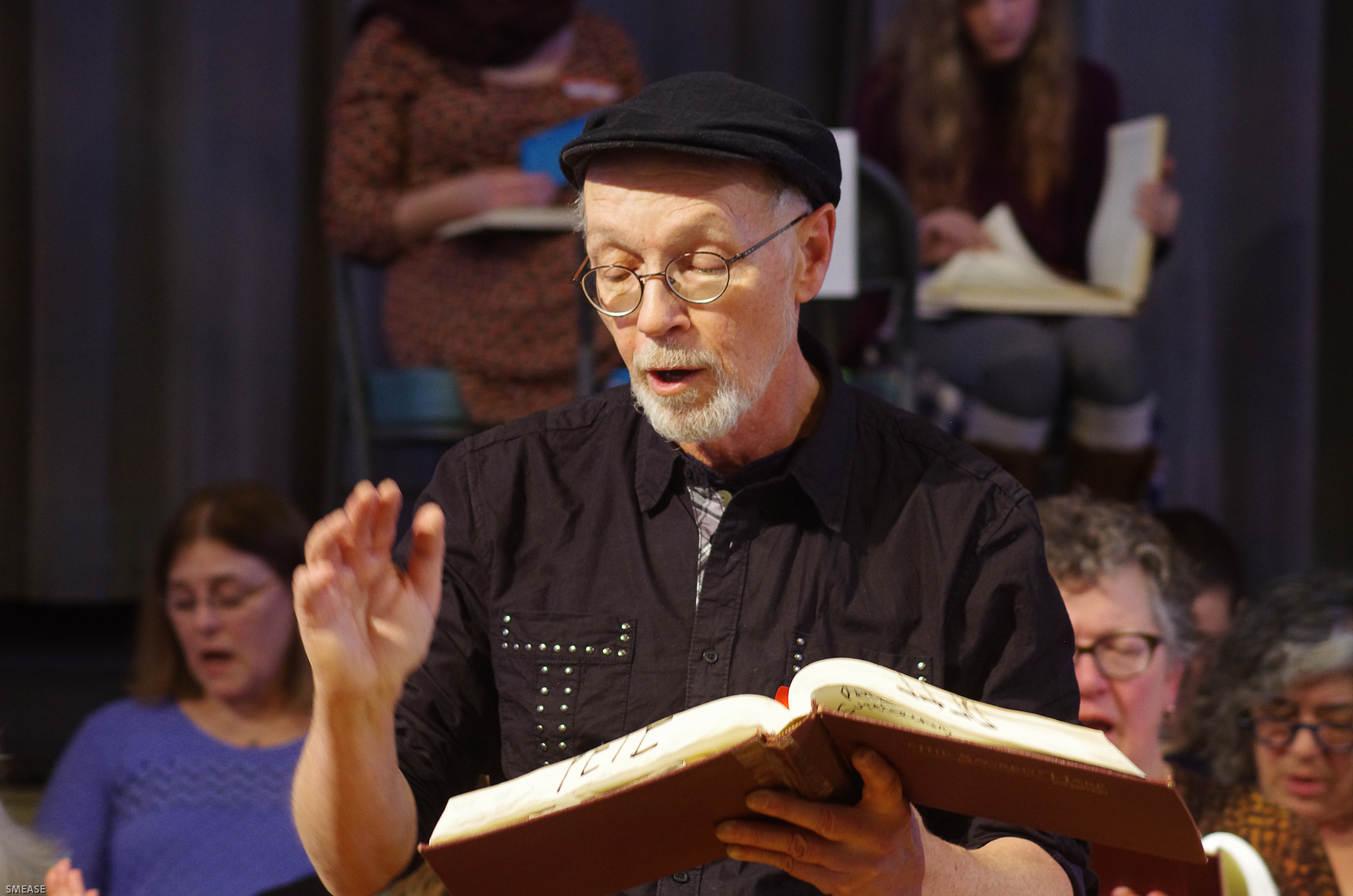
- Sutherland leading Sacred Harp singing in 2017

Background information
- Born: Peter Jeffrey Sutherland; May 13, 1951; Burlington, Vermont, U.S.
- Died: November 30, 2022 (aged 71) Montpelier, Vermont, U.S.
- Genres: Folk
- Member of: Pete's Posse; Clayfoot Strutters; Metamora; Woods Tea Company
- Spouse(s): Karen Billings (divorced) 1 child

Peter Jeffrey Sutherland (May 13, 1951 – November 30, 2022) was an American folk musician. He was considered a leader of the Americana and traditional music scene in Vermont. He performed with the Clayfoot Strutters and was the bandleader of Pete's Posse. In addition to performing, he was actively involved with teaching music throughout his career. He worked with organizations like Young Tradition Vermont.

== Early life and education ==
Sutherland was born on May 13, 1951, in Burlington, Vermont. His mother, Mary Lou, was a classical pianist and homemaker. His father, Bob, worked at General Electric. He grew up in a small house on a dirt road in Shelburne, Vermont, the oldest of four brothers.

Sutherland showed an early interest in music. His mother said that he "could hum a recognizable tune before he could talk." He also took piano lessons. As a teenager, he gathered with peers at a neighbor's kitchen table, where he played guitar to accompany their singing.

After graduating from Champlain Valley Union High School, he enrolled at Castleton State College, where he learned banjo and fiddle and developed his musical interests. He transferred to the University of Vermont his junior year, where he majored in English and education.

== Career ==
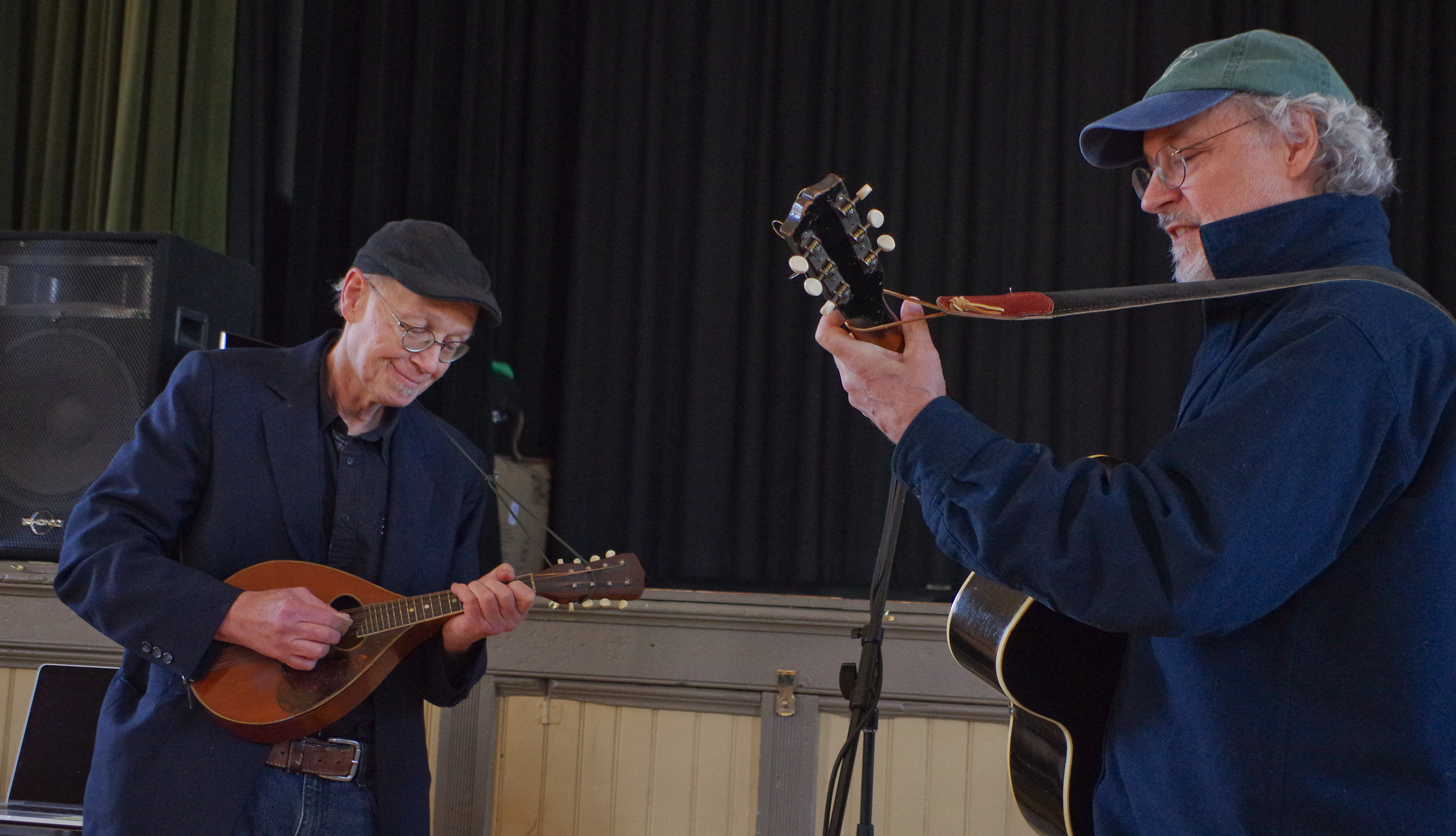
Sutherland (left) playing mandolin in Bristol, Vermont, 2017

In the 1970s, Sutherland spent time in North Carolina learning bluegrass traditions. He held various jobs, including apple picking, to support himself.

In the 1980s, Sutherland moved to Bloomington, Indiana. He toured with a band called Metamora, visiting every state except Hawaii.

By 1990, he moved back to Vermont. He played with various musical groups, including the Clayfoot Strutters and Pete's Posse, where he was the bandleader. He was also an artist leader for Young Tradition Vermont, a youth music and dance program he helped establish.

Sutherland mentored many young musicians, including Oliver Scanlon, who joined his contra dance band as a fourth grader and later joined Pete's Posse. The band gained prominence during a 2002 cross-country tour.

Sutherland performed regularly for the Vermont seasonal production "Winter Tales". He was also the music producer for the Old Meeting House summer concert in East Montpelier, Vermont.

He hosted concerts at his house for approximately $10, discounted by a dollar for anyone who brought their own chair.

== Personal life ==
Sutherland met his spouse, Karen (née Billings), while playing hammered dulcimer at UVM's student center in 1972. They had a son, Calem, c. 1990, and divorced c. 2016.

Sutherland lived in a converted former general store in Monkton, Vermont. He maintained a large garden and foraged for food. He took an interest in his son's hobbies, including at various points baseball, American history and filmmaking.

== Later life, death, and legacy ==
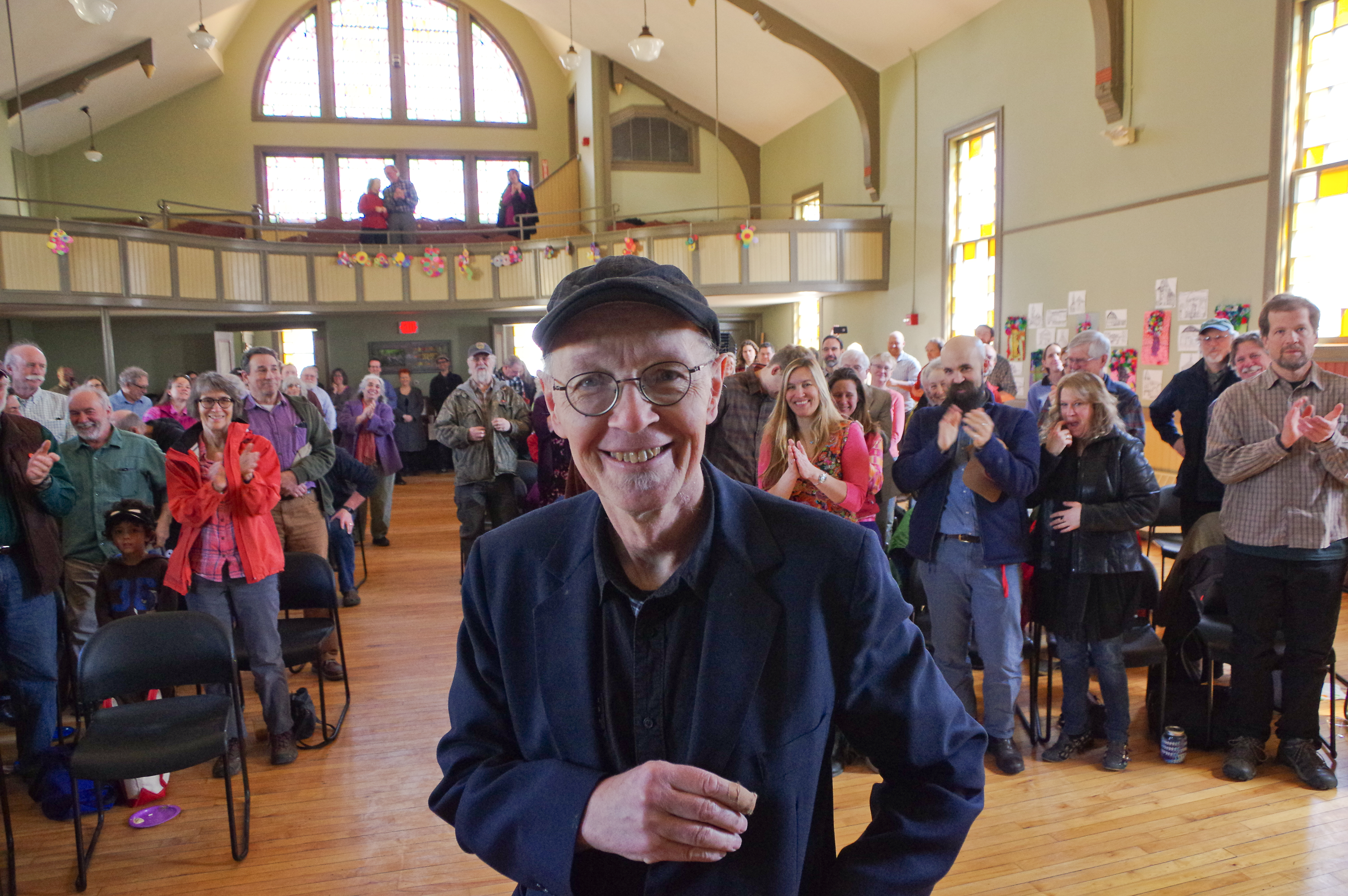
Sutherland at a town tribute in Bristol, Vermont, in 2017

A few years before his death, Sutherland sold his Monkton house and began living with friends in Chittenden County and central Vermont. He dealt with prostate cancer for more than a decade. He moved into a hospice in Montpelier c. October 2022, but remained mentally acute, and received visits from many musicians who played at his bedside. He ended his life on November 30, 2022, using Vermont's medical aid in dying law.

Sutherland received many tributes after his death praising his contributions, mentoring, and humbleness. The Barre Montpelier Times Argus described him as "arguably the dean of Vermont traditional music" in its obituary.
