= Harmonious Wail =

American music group

- Origin: Madison, Wisconsin, USA
- Genres: jazz, swing, americana, and cabaret
- Years active: 1987–present
- Members: Sims Delaney-Potthoff; Maggie Delaney-Potthoff
- Past members: John Cooper; Chris Wagoner; Laurie Lang; Jeff Weiss; Doug Brown; Tom Waselchuk; Henry Boehm; Jon Cristensen
- Website: harmoniouswail.com

Harmonious Wail is an American musical group from Madison, Wisconsin, known for their eclectic blend of gypsy jazz, acoustic swing, americana, and cabaret. The group was founded in 1987 by members Sims Delaney-Pothoff, John Cooper, Chris Wagoner, and Laurie Lang. Later members include Maggie Delaney-Pothoff, Jeff Weiss, Doug Brown, Tom Waselchuck, Henry Boehm, and Jon Cristensen. They have received many awards, including the Best Jazz Album award, and have produced 9 albums.

== History ==
Harmonious Wail was founded in Madison, Wisconsin, in 1987 by Sims Delaney-Pothoff (mandolin), John Cooper (guitar), Chris Wagoner (violin), and Laurie Lang (bass). Founders Sims and Maggie Delaney-Pothoff had both moved to Madison in 1978, though they did not meet until a year later at a local club where Sims was performing with the bluegrass band Stone Oak. In 1984, Sims moved to Boston to attend the Berklee College of Music. During his formative years as a musician, he was mentored by mandolinist Jethro Burns in Evanston, Illinois.

Maggie Delaney-Pothoff, who had made occasional guest appearances since the band's inception, became a permanent member around 1990 following Cooper's departure. Although her background was in classical music and music theater, she began performing the group's instrumental melodic lines vocally, a transition that helped define the band's sound. In addition to vocals, she also performs as a percussionist, notably using brushes on a cardboard box.

While the band's early repertoire included Louis Jordan and Nat King Cole covers, their direction changed following a 1994 European tour. After hearing the Robin Nolan Quartet in Amsterdam, the group dedicated itself to "authentic Django Reinhardt gypsy jazz." Since then, they have expanded their sound to include elements of Americana. This transition eventually led to the group founding the Midwest Gypsy Swing Festival in the early 2000s, an event held twice a year in Madison.

In 2011, bassist Jeff Weiss joined the group. Raised in Middleton, Wisconsin, Weiss began as a saxophonist before switching to bass. He studied under Richard Davis at the University of Wisconsin–Madison and pursued a career in classical music, including an audition for the Chicago Symphony Orchestra, before dedicating himself to jazz. Weiss won the Madison Area Music Award (MAMA) for Best Bassist in 2012.

Throughout its history, the band has performed across the United States and Europe and collaborated with National Public Radio (NPR). Other significant contributors and former members include guitarists Doug Brown and Tom Waselchuk, and bassists Henry Boehm and Jon Cristensen.

== Awards and recognition ==
Throughout their career, Harmonious Wail has received numerous awards, including honors at the Madison Area Music Awards (MAMA) for Best Jazz Album, Best Cover Song, and Best Percussionist. They received the Musicnotes Award for Outstanding Musical Career Achievement in 2017. Their 2019 album Holiday Spirits won the award for Best Jazz Album, while the song What the World Needs Now, Is Love Sweet Love was named Best Cover Song that same year.

== Discography ==
- Airborne (Bufflehead Recordings, 1993)
- Live at the Zelt Music Festival (Bufflehead Recordings, 1997) – live rec. 1996
- Gypsy Swing (Naxos, 2003)
- Resist Temptation (Range, 2008)
- The Vegan Zombie's Lament (Range, 2010)
- Bohemian Tango (Bufflehead Recordings, 2013)
- Holiday Spirits (Bufflehead Recordings, 2014)
- Beyond the Pale (Bufflehead Recordings, 2020)
- Wailing Allstars Bufflehead Recordings, 2022) – live
