= Josh White Jr. =

American recording artist (1940–2024)

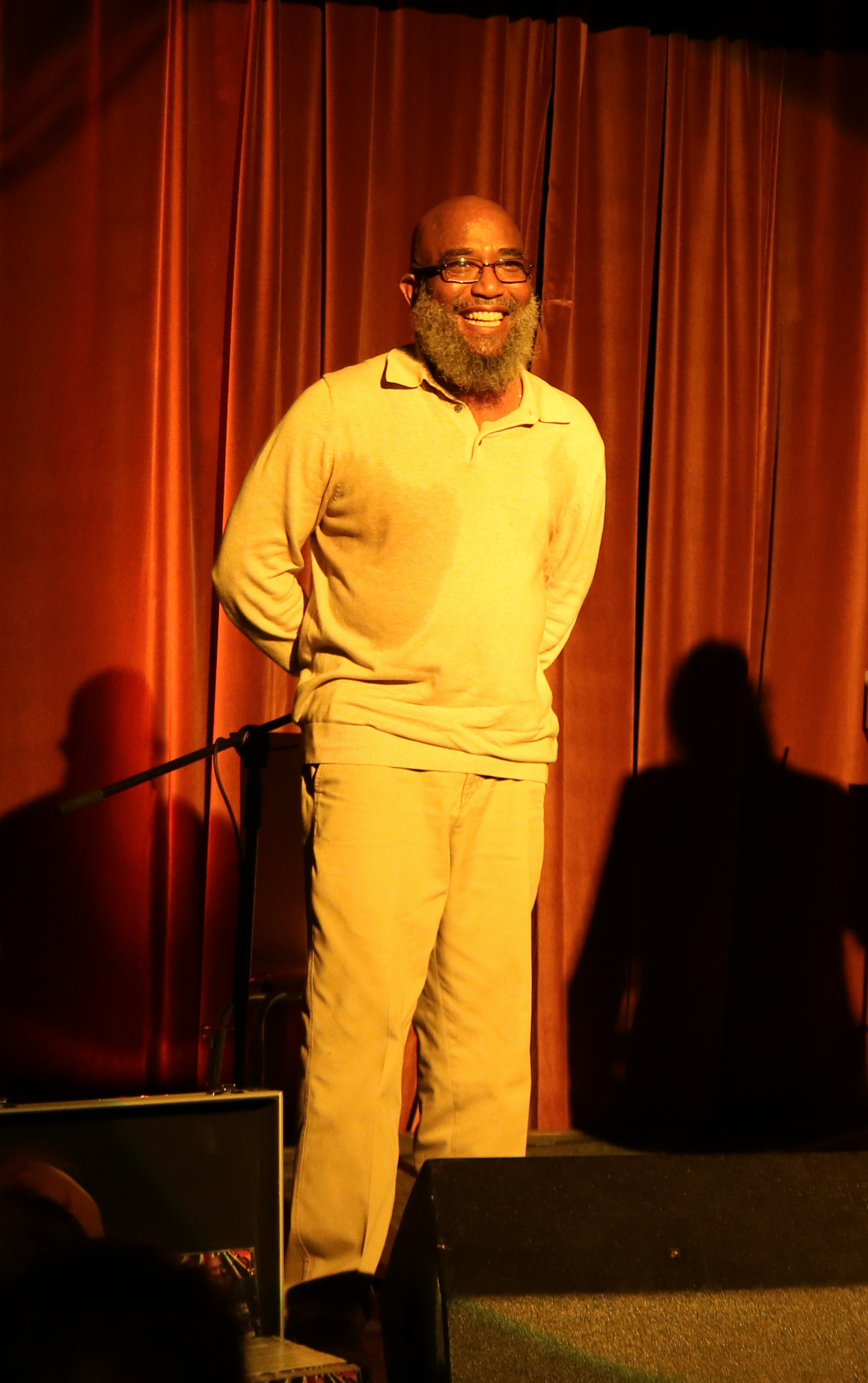

Background information
- Born: November 30, 1940; New York City, U.S.
- Died: December 28, 2024 (aged 84) Rochester, Michigan, U.S.
- Genres: Blues; folk
- Occupation: Singer
- Instruments: Vocals, guitar
- Years active: 1945–2024
- Labels: Decca, Shanachie, Silverwolf

Joshua Donald White Jr. (November 30, 1940 – December 28, 2024) was an American Grammy Award-nominated recording artist who upheld the musical traditions of his father, the late bluesman Josh White.

== Early life ==
White was born in Manhattan on November 30, 1940 to blues performer Josh White and gospel singer Carol Carr White. He grew up in the Sugar Hill area of Harlem. He attended Professional Children's School in Manhattan, alongside Elliott Gould, Christopher Walken and Marvin Hamlisch.

== Career ==
At the age of four, Josh White Jr. made his professional debut alongside his father at the Café Society in New York City. In 1949, he co-starred with the elder White on Broadway in How Long Til Summer? For his work on the show, Josh White Jr. received a special Tony Award.

In 1956, Josh White Jr. made his solo recording debut on Decca with "See Saw," co-written with Marvin Hamlisch.

In the 1960s, White became a popular attraction in the college tour circuit, while continuing to record.

In 1979, he headlined at concert special for PBS and starred in a stage biography of his father a few years later.

He received a Grammy nomination in 1987 for Jazz, Ballads and Blues, another tribute to his father.

His album, Tuning for the Blues, is a collection of folk tunes which was released in 2011.

== Personal life ==
White married Jackie Harris in 1963. She was murdered in their New York apartment as part of a robbery in 1971. White relocated to upstate New York with his two children. He remarried in 1978. White died at the age of 84 on December 28, 2024, in Rochester, Michigan, the day after announcing his retirement.
