= Storm Windows =

Studio album by John Prine
- Released: October 30, 1980
- Recorded: Muscle Shoals (Sheffield, Alabama)
- Genre: Folk, alt-country, Americana
- Label: Asylum
- Producer: Barry Beckett

John Prine chronology
Pink Cadillac (1979)	Storm Windows (1980)	Aimless Love (1984)

Storm Windows is the seventh album by American folk singer and songwriter John Prine, released in 1980. It was his last release on a major label; he joined Al Bunetta and Dan Einstein to form Oh Boy Records, on which all his subsequent recordings were released.

== Recording ==
After receiving some of the worst reviews of his career for the 1979 party album Pink Cadillac, Prine moved towards a more country-flavored sound on Storm Windows which foreshadowed much of his work in Nashville in the 1980s. The album was produced by Barry Beckett, who had previously worked with Paul Simon and Bob Dylan, and was recorded at the legendary Muscle Shoals Sound Studios in Sheffield, Alabama. Critics liked it far more than Prine's previous release but, as David Fricke observed in 1993, many listeners might be surprised to learn that "half of the songs that ended up on that album were first tried out during those madhouse Pink Cadillac sessions." The album was a return to a relatively polished, full-band sound closer to Sweet Revenge and Common Sense than the acoustic folk-pop of Bruised Orange or the murky rockabilly of Pink Cadillac. The LP concluded Prine's three-album obligation to Asylum Records.

== Composition ==
Storm Windows features six original Prine compositions and two songs co-written with guitarist John Burns. Several of the songs, such as the title track, were inspired by Prine's childhood, with the singer recalling in the Great Days anthology: "I grew up on a four-lane highway. Lots of trucks. Lots of traffic. I used to have these spells every so often as a child where like the ceiling of the room was in normal perspective, but the doorway would appear much farther away than it was. Coupled with this, all noises seemed muffled and distant, particularly the traffic moving on the wet or snow-covered pavement. I was really in another world. I finally worked up the courage to tell my mother and father about it, and Mom made Dad take me to the eye doctor. I love them both." Prine added that "One Red Rose" was about an overnight stay with his cousin Charlie Bill. "It was the back of a general store in Paradise. There was a tin roof and a wonderful thunderstorm going on above and around us. We were telling ghost stories and staying up late, and there was a curtain separating the bedroom from the mature adults' kitchen. Our light was off. Thus, their 'kitchen light fell asleep on the bedroom floor.' I was nine."

The title track was a resigned epic in the style of Van Morrison and the Band, a rare Prine recording that was built around the piano, played by producer Beckett, rather than guitar, while Prine's then bass playing girlfriend Rachel Peer sang background vocals on a couple of tunes. In the liner notes of his 1988 album John Prine Live, the singer writes that the idea for the comical "Living in the Future" came from being a kid and "seeing sketches of how the world would look in twenty years and here it is in the future and things aren't better; they're just here....The joke's on us."

== Reception ==
Professional ratings
Review scores
Source	Rating
AllMusic	3/5 stars
Robert Christgau	A−
The Rolling Stone Album Guide	3.5/5 stars

Storm Windows received generally positive reviews upon release, with Ken Tucker of Rolling Stone praising Barry Beckett's production and noting that Storm Windows "strikes a stunning balance between the artist's last two radically different releases." For AllMusic, critic Ronnie D. Lankford, Jr. wrote: "Storm Windows isn't a bad album, but the songs and "studio musician" production lack the bite of Bruised Orange. While Storm Windows captures Prine on autopilot, fans will enjoy listening to his reflections at this transitional stage."

== Track listing ==
All tracks composed by John Prine; except where indicated.

1. "Shop Talk" (Prine, John Burns) – 3:12
2. "Living in the Future" – 3:26
3. "It's Happening to You" (Prine, John Burns) – 2:18
4. "Sleepy Eyed Boy" – 2:53
5. "All Night Blue" (Ava Aldridge, Cindy Richardson) – 2:46
6. "Just Wanna Be With You" – 3:07
7. "Storm Windows" – 5:04
8. "Baby Ruth" (Johnny Wyker) – 3:07
9. "One Red Rose" – 3:17
10. "I Had a Dream" – 3:30

== Personnel ==
- John Prine – vocals, guitar
- Barry Beckett – piano
- John Burns – guitar, harmony vocals
- Bob Hoban – organ, fiddle, mandolin, piano, backing vocals
- Leo LeBlanc – steel guitar
- Rachel Peer – harmony vocals
- Wayne Perkins – guitar
- Tom Piekarske – bass, backing vocals
- Angie Varias – drums

== Chart positions ==
Year	Chart	Position
1980	Billboard Pop Albums	144
