= The Best of Bob Dylan's Theme Time Radio Hour =

Compilation album by Various artists
- Released: November 20, 2007
- Genres: Blues, R&B, rockabilly, doo-wop, soul, jazz, rock-and-roll, country
- Label: Chrome Dreams
- Producer: Derek Barker

The Best of Bob Dylan's Theme Time Radio Hour is a series of four compilation albums featuring songs Bob Dylan played on his shows as a deejay on the XM Satellite Radio and Sirius XM Satellite Radio program, Theme Time Radio Hour, from May 2006 through April 2009. Each album in the series includes 52 songs on two CDs. The tracks cover the range of genres Dylan highlighted on the program, including blues, R&B, rockabilly, doo-wop, soul, jazz, rock-and-roll and country.

== Track listings ==
=== Best of Bob Dylan's Theme Time Radio Hour, Volume 1 ===
==== Disc one ====
1. "Keep on the Sunny Side", The Carter Family (Show 1, Weather) - 2:51
2. "(Mama) He Treats Your Daughter Mean", Ruth Brown (Show 2, Mothers) - 2:59
3. "Ain't Got No Money to Pay for This Drink", George Zimmerman & The Thrills (Show 3, Drinking) - 2:33
4. "The Ball Game", Sister Winona Carr (Show 4, Baseball) - 3:09
5. "Java Jive", The Ink Spots (Show 5, Coffee) - 3:05
6. "Send Me to the 'Lectric Chair", Bessie Smith (Show 6, Jail) - 3:22
7. "Papa's on the Housetop", Leroy Carr & Scrapper Blackwell (Show 7, Father) - 2:59
8. "Married Women", Big Joe Turner (Show 8, Wedding) - 2:48
9. "Alimony Blues", Eddie "Cleanhead" Vinson (Show 9, Divorce) - 2:24
10. "Ice Cream Man", John Brim (Show 10, Summer) - 2:48
11. "Tulip or Turnip", Duke Ellington & His Orchestra (Show 11, Flowers) - 3:12
12. "No Money Down", Chuck Berry (Show 12, Cars) - 2:57
13. "Brother, Can You Spare a Dime?", Bing Crosby (Show 13, Rich Man Poor Man) - 3:10
14. "Race with the Devil", Gene Vincent (Show 14, The Devil) - 2:03
15. "Brown Eyed Handsome Man", Chuck Berry (Show 15, Eyes) - 2:19
16. "Hound Dog", Freddy Bell & the Bell Boys (Show 16, Dogs) - 2:39
17. "Last Night", Little Walter (Show 17, Friends & Neighbors) - 2:43
18. "Disc Jockey Blues", Luke Jones & His Orchestra (Show 18, Radio) - 3:02
19. "John the Revelator", Blind Willie Johnson (Show 19, Bible) - 3:18
20. "Louisiana", Percy Mayfield (Show 20, Musical Map) - 2:04
21. "Good Morning Little School Girl", Sonny Boy Williamson (Show 21, School) - 3:01
22. "Telephone Is Ringing", Pee Wee Crayton (Show 22, Telephone) - 3:07
23. "Jesus Gave Me Water", The Five Blind Boys of Mississippi (Show 23, Water) - 2:48
24. "All the Time", Sleepy LaBeef (Show 24, Time) - 1:52
25. "Midnight Hour", Clarence "Gatemouth" Brown (Show 24, Time) - 2:43
26. "Pistol Packin' Mama", Al Dexter & His Orchestra (Show 25, Guns) - 2:47

==== Disc two ====
1. "I Put a Spell on You", Screamin' Jay Hawkins (Show 26, Halloween) - 2:25
2. "When You Dance, The Turbans (Show 27, Dance) - 2:57
3. "When It's Sleepy Time Down South", Louis Armstrong (Show 28, Sleep) - 2:47
4. "Matzoh Balls, Slim Gaillard & His Flat Foot Floogie Boys (Show 29, Food) - 2:38
5. "Let Me Play with Your Poodle", Tampa Red & Big Maceo (Show 30, Thanksgiving Leftovers) - 2:39
6. "Tennessee", Carl Perkins (Show 31, Tennessee) - 3:04
7. "Blue Moon of Kentucky", Bill Monroe (Show 32, Moon) - 3:03
8. "Five Long Years", Eddie Boyd (Show 33, Countdown) - 2:42
9. "Christmas Is A-Comin'", Leadbelly (Show 34, Christmas/New Year) - 1:08
10. "Zindy Lou", The Chimes (Show 35, Women's Names) - 3:08
11. "Don't Touch My Head", J.B. Lenoir (Show 36, Hair) - 2:17
12. "Don't Mess with My Ducktail", Joe Clay (Show 36, Hair) - 2:27
13. "(Everytime I Hear) That Mello Saxophone", Roy Montrell (Show 37, Musical Instruments) - 2:25
14. "Alright, Okay, You Win!", Buddy & Ella Johnson (Show 38, Luck) - 2:48
15. "I'm So Lonesome I Could Cry", Hank Williams (Show 39, Tears) - 2:48
16. "Lose Your Blues and Laugh at Life", Jimmie Rev & His Oklahoma Playboys (Show 40, Laughter) - 3:18
17. "Good Morning Heartache", Billie Holiday (Show 41, Heart) - 3:12
18. "Blue Suede Shoes", Carl Perkins (Show 42, Shoes) - 2:17
19. "Deep Purple", The Ravens (Show 43, Colour) - 2:48
20. "Blue Yodel #1 (T for Texas)", Bob Downen (Show 44, Texas) - 2:34
21. "Mystery Train", Little Junior Parker (Show 45, Trains) - 2:23
22. "This Train", Sister Rosetta Tharpe (Show 46, More Trains) - 2:53
23. "Why Do Fools Fall in Love", Frankie Lymon & the Teenagers (Show 47, Fools) - 2:18
24. "Take the "A" Train", Duke Ellington (Show 48, New York) - 2:54
25. "Taxes, Taxes", Hank Penny (Show 49, Death and Taxes) - 2:48
26. "Richest Guy in the Graveyard", Dinah Washington (Show 50, Spring Cleaning) - 2:54

=== Best of Bob Dylan's Theme Time Radio Hour, Volume 2 ===
==== Disc one ====
1. "Jamaica Hurricane", Lord Beginner (Show 1, Weather)
2. "Just Walkin' in the Rain" (Bragg, Riley), The Prisonaires (Show 1, Weather)
3. "Mother Fuyer", Dirty Red (Show 2, Mothers)
4. "One Mint Julep" (Rudy Toombs), The Clovers (Show 3, Drinking)
5. "Did You See Jackie Robinson Hit That Ball", Buddy Johnson (Show 4, Baseball)
6. "Forty Cups of Coffee", Ella Mae Morse (Show 5, Coffee)
7. "Folsom Prison Blues" (Cash), Johnny Cash (Show 6, Jail)
8. "My Son Calls Another Man Daddy", Hank Williams (Show 7, Father)
9. "Fannie Brown Got Married", Roy Brown (Show 8, Wedding)
10. "Divorce Me C.O.D." (Travis), Merle Travis (Show 9, Divorce)
11. "June-teenth Jamboree", Fatso Bentley (Show 10, Summer)
12. "Bonny Bunch of Roses", Paul Clayton (Show 11, Flowers)
13. "Every Woman I Know", Billy "The Kid" Emerson (Show 12, Cars)
14. "Get Rich Quick", Little Richard (Show 13, Rich Man, Poor Man)
15. "Must Have Been The Devil", Otis Spann (Show 14, The Devil)
16. "20/20 Vision", Jimmy Martin (Show 15, Eyes)
17. "Ain't I'm a Dog?", Ronnie Self (Show 16, Dogs)
18. "My Next Door Neighbor", Jerry McCain & His Upstarts (Show 17, Friends & Neighbours)
19. "Radio Boogie" (Mayo, Smith), L.C. Smith & His Southern Playboys (Show 18, Radio)
20. "The Old Ark's A'Moving", A.A. Gray & Seven Foot Dilly (Show 19, Bible)
21. "Take Me Back to Tulsa" (B. Wills, T. Duncan), Bob Wills & His Texas Playboys (Show 20, Musical Map)
22. "Professor Bop", Babs Gonzales (Show 21, School)
23. "Atomic Telephone", The Spirit of Memphis Quartet (Show 22, Telephone)
24. "Water, Water", Effie Smith & The Squires (Show 23, Water)
25. "24 Hours", Eddie Boyd (Show 24, Time)
26. "Shotgun Boogie", Tennessee Ernie Ford (Show 25, Guns)

==== Disc two ====
1. "Hoo-Doo Say", The Sly Fox (Show 26, Halloween)
2. "Back To Back, Belly To Belly (Zombie Jamboree)" (Conrad Eugene Mauge Jr.), The Charmer (Show 26, Halloween)
3. "I Can't Dance (I've Got Ants In My Pants)", Roy Newman (Show 27, Dance)
4. "A Man's Best Friend Is a Bed", Louis Jordan & His Tympany Five (Show 28, Sleep)
5. "Hungry Man", Louis Jordan & His Tympany Five (Show 29, Food)
6. "Let's Be Friends", Billy Wright (Show 30, Leftovers)
7. "Tennessee Border", Hank Williams (Show 31, Tennessee)
8. "Havana Moon", Chuck Berry (Show 32, Moon)
9. "3 x 7 = 21", Jewel King (Show 33, Countdown)
10. "Christmas Morning", Titus Turner (Show 34, Christmas/New Year)
11. "Peggy Sue" (Holly, Allison, Petty), Buddy Holly (Show 35, Women's Names)
12. "Red Headed Woman", Sonny Burgess (Show 36, Hair)
13. "Uncle Pen", Bill Monroe & His Bluegrass Boys (Show 37, Musical Instruments)
14. "Bad Luck Blues", Guitar Slim (Show 38, Luck)
15. "Drown in My Own Tears", Lula Reed (Show 39, Tears)
16. "I've Got The Last Laugh Now", Roy Brown (Show 40, Laughter)
17. "Hearts of Stone" (Rudy Jackson), The Jewels (Show 41, Heart)
18. "Paper in My Shoes", Boozoo Chavis (Show 42, Shoes)
19. "Pink Cadillac", Sammy Masters (Show 43, Colour)
20. "Drifting Texas Sand", Webb Pierce (Show 44, Texas)
21. "Still A Fool (Two Trains Running)", Muddy Waters (Show 45, Trains)
22. "All Aboard", Muddy Waters (Show 46, More Trains)
23. "(Now and Then There's) A Fool Such as I" (Bill Trader), Hank Snow (Show 47, Fools)
24. "Let Me Off Uptown", Anita O'Day & Roy Eldridge (Show 48, New York)
25. "Tax Payin' Blues", J.B. Lenoir (Show 49, Death & Taxes)
26. "Bad, Bad Whiskey" (Milburn), Amos Milburn (Show 50, Spring Cleaning)

=== Bob Dylan's Theme Time Radio Hour, Volume 3 (Best of the Second Series) ===
==== Disc one ====
1. "Hello Stranger" (Carter), The Carter Family - 2:48
2. "Young Man's Blues" (Allison), Mose Allison - 1:26
3. "Young Fashioned Ways" (Dixon), Muddy Waters - 3:02
4. "Lucy Mae Blues" (Sims), Frankie Lee Sims - 2:32
5. "Blue Monday" (Domino, Bartholomew), Smiley Lewis - 2:42
6. "California Blues" (Rodgers), Webb Pierce - 3:02
7. "Rollin' Stone" (Waters), Muddy Waters - 3:05
8. "Mr. Thrill" (Jones), Mildred Jones - 2:34
9. "Speedo" (Navarro), The Cadillacs - 2:23
10. "Dry Bones" (Traditional), The Delta Rhythm Boys - 3:31
11. "Roll in My Sweet Baby's Arms" (Trad., Arr. Monroe), The Monroe Brothers - 2:30
12. "Big Legs" (Phillips, Taub), Gene Phillips - 2:58
13. "Brain Cloudy Blues" (B. Wills/T. Duncan), Bob Wills & His Texas Playboys - 2:47
14. "Smoke! Smoke! Smoke! (That Cigarette)" (Travis, Williams), Tex Williams & His Western Caravan - 2:54
15. "Cigareets, Whuskey and Wild, Wild Women" (Spencer), Red Ingle & The Natural Seven - 2:38
16. "Reefer Man" (Razaf, Robinson), Baron Lee - 2:50
17. "All I Have To Do Is Dream" (Bryant), The Everly Brothers - 2:20
18. "Sh-Boom" (Feaster, Feaster, Keyes, Edwards, McRae), The Chords - 2:28
19. "Let's Have a Party" (Robinson), Wanda Jackson - 2:11
20. "Caldonia's Party" (Bartholomew), Smiley Lewis - 2:10
21. "One Bad Stud" (Leiber, Stoller), The Honey Bears - 2:26
22. "Dedicated to the One I Love" (Bass, Pauling), The "5" Royales - 2:44
23. "One Night" (Bartholomew, King), Elvis Presley - 2:32
24. "Walking By Myself" (Rogers), Jimmy Rogers & Big Walter Horton - 2:48
25. "The Walk" (McCracklin, Bob Garlic), Jimmy McCracklin - 2:42
26. "Down in Mexico" (Leiber, Stoller), The Coasters - 3:14

==== Disc two ====
1. "All Around The World" (Turner), Little Willie John - 2:58
2. "Ubangi Stomp" (Underwood), Warren Smith - 2:00
3. "The Key (To Your Door)" (Williamson), Sonny Boy Williamson - 3:17
4. "Key To The Highway" (Broonzy, Segar), Little Walter - 2:57
5. "Write Me a Letter" (Biggs), The Ravens - 2:52
6. "I'm Gonna Sit Right Down and Write Myself a Letter" (Ahlert, Young), Fats Waller - 3:30
7. "I Feel That Old Age Coming On" (Sherman, Mann, Harris, Burns), Wynonie Harris - 2:47
8. "(Gotta Go) Upside Your Head" (Johnson), Buddy & Ella Johnson - 2:46
9. "Gloomy Sunday" (Seress, Javor, Lewis), Billie Holiday - 3:13
10. "Send For The Doctor" (Pomus), Doc Pomus - 2:14
11. "Dr. Kinsey Report" (Williams), Lord Lebby - 3:13
12. "Hadocal Boogie", Bill Nettles & The Dixie Blue Boys - 2:46
13. "Better Beware" (Otis, Darnell), Esther Phillips - 2:38
14. "You're The Dangerous Type" (Dorough), Bob Dorough - 4:20
15. "Be Careful (What You Say and Do)" (Brim), John Brim - 2:41
16. "The Rooster Song" (Domino, Bartholomew), Fats Domino - 2:06
17. "Bird Gets The Worm" (Parker), Charlie Parker - 2:37
18. "White Dove" (Carter Stanley), The Stanley Brothers - 3:17
19. "Hold 'Em Joe" (Thomas), Andre Toussaint - 1:25
20. "Where's Joe?" (Barker), Blue Lu Barker - 2:49
21. "Diamond Joe" (Trad., Arr. Houston), Cisco Houston - 2:25
22. "Red Hot" (Emerson), Billy Lee Riley - 2:32
23. "Great Balls Of Fire" (Blackwell, Hammer), Jerry Lee Lewis 1:53
24. "Hot Little Mama" (Watson, Davis, Taub), Johnny "Guitar" Watson - 2:42
25. "Cold Cold Feeling" (Robinson), T-Bone Walker - 3:10
26. "Stone Cold Man" (The Charmer), The Charmer - 2:32

=== Bob Dylan's Theme Time Radio Hour: The Best Of The Third Series ===
==== Disc one ====
1. "Greenbacks", Ray Charles
2. "My Baby's Just Like Money", Lefty Frizzell (Show 1, Money)
3. "Your Cash Ain't Nothin' But Trash", The Clovers (Show 1, Money)
4. "Money Honey" (Clyde McPhatter), The Drifters (Show 1, Money)
5. "Why Don't You Eat Where You Slept Last Night?", Zuzu Bollin (Show 3, Night)
6. "In the Night", Professor Longhair (Show 3, Night)
7. "Don't Start Me to Talkin'", Sonny Boy Williamson (Show 4, Beginnings, Middles, Ends)
8. "In the Middle of the Night", Amos Milburn (Show 4, Beginnings, Middles, Ends)
9. "Flesh, Blood and Bone", Little Esther (Show 5, Blood)
10. "She Made My Blood Run Cold", Ike Turner (Show 5, Blood)
11. "Searching for a Soldier's Grave", The Bailes Brothers (Show 6, War)
12. "Drive Soldiers Drive", Little Maxie Bailey (Show 6, War)
13. "Peaches in the Springtime", Memphis Jug Band (Show 7, Fruit)
14. "W-P-L-J", The Four Deuces (Show 7, Fruit)
15. "The Banana Boat Song (Day-O)", Harry Belafonte (Show 7, Fruit)
16. "Straight Street", The Pilgrim Travelers (Show 8, Street Map)
17. "Lost Highway", Hank Williams (Show 8, Street Map)
18. "Route 90", Clarence "Bon Ton" Garlow (Show 8, Street Map)
19. "Jack Palance", Mighty Sparrow (Show 9, Famous People)
20. "My Boy Elvis", Janis Martin (Show 9, Famous People)
21. "Forty Days and Forty Nights", Muddy Waters (Show 10, Numbers 11 & Up)
22. "Girl Fifteen", Floyd Dixon (Show 10, Numbers 11 & Up)
23. "Call It Stormy Monday (But Tuesday Is Just As Bad)", T-Bone Walker (Show 11, Work)
24. "Nice Work If You Can Get It", Sarah Vaughan (Show 11, Work)
25. "That Ain't Nothin' But Right", Mac Curtis (Show 12, Nothing)
26. "She's Got Something", Jimmy Ballard (Show 13, Something)

==== Disc two ====
1. "Dead Cats on the Line", Tampa Red & Georgia Tom (Show 14, Cats)
2. "It's Fun to Be Livin' in the Crazy House", Redd Foxx (Show 15, Madness)
3. "Lost Mind", Mose Allison (Show 15, Madness)
4. "I Want to Be Happy", Ella Fitzgerald (Show 16, Happiness)
5. "Happy Home", Elmore James (Show 16, Happiness)
6. "Feelin' High And Happy", Hot Lips Page (Show 16, Happiness)
7. "Dirty People", Smiley Lewis (Show 17, Cops & Robbers)
8. "Sugar Coated Love", Lazy Lester (Show 18, Sugar & Candy)
9. "Big Rock Candy Mountain", Harry McClintock (Show 19, Questions)
10. "Who Do You Love?" (Diddley), Bo Diddley (Show 19, Questions)
11. "Whadaya Want?", The Robins (Show 19, Questions)
12. "What Is This Thing Called Love?", Billie Holiday (Show 19, Questions)
13. "True Blue Papa", Leon Chappel (Show 20, Truth & Lies)
14. "Your True Love", Carl Perkins (Show 20, Truth & Lies)
15. "It's Only Make Believe", Conway Twitty (Show 20, Truth & Lies)
16. "I'm My Own Grandpa", Lonzo & Oscar (Show 21, Family Circle)
17. "The Seventh Son", Willie Mabon (Show 21, Family Circle)
18. "Barnyard Boogie", Louis Jordan & His Tympany Five (Show 22, Noah's Ark)
19. "Fattening Frogs For Snakes", Sonny Boy Williamson II (Show 22, Noah's Ark)
20. "Calling All Cows", Lazy Bill Lucas & the Blues Rockers (Show 23, Noah's Ark)
21. "Little Sadie", Clarence Ashley (Show 24, Big Clearance Sale)
22. "Bon Ton Roula", Clarence "Bon Ton" Garlow (Show 24, Big Clearance Sale)
23. "Ain't Got No Home", Clarence "Frogman" Henry (Show 24, Big Clearance Sale)
24. "Much Later", Jackie Brenston (Show 25, Goodbye)
25. "So Long, I'm Gone", Warren Smith (Show 25, Goodbye)
26. "So Long, It's Been Good to Know Yuh (Dusty Old Dust)", Woody Guthrie (Show 25, Goodbye)
