= The Sun Records Collection =

Compilation album by Various Artists
- Released: 1994
- Recorded: 1950s
- Genre: Rock
- Length: 187:19
- Label: Rhino/WEA
- Producer: ?

Professional ratings
Review scores
| Source | Rating |
|---|---|
| Allmusic | link |

The Sun Records Collection is a 1994 compilation album released by Rhino Records, compiling some of the finest recordings of the label Sun Records.

In 2012, the album was ranked number 311 on Rolling Stone magazine's list of the 500 greatest albums of all time.

== Track listing ==
=== Disc one ===
1. "Gotta Let You Go" – Joe Hill Louis – 2:43
2. "Rocket 88" – Jackie Brenston – 2:47
3. "B.B. Blues" – B. B. King – 2:31
4. "Swamp Root" – Harmonica Frank – 2:34
5. "Moanin' at Midnight" – Howlin' Wolf – 2:55
6. "How Many More Years" – Howlin' Wolf – 2:41
7. "There's a Man in Jerusalem" – Southern Jubilee Singers – 2:23
8. "Rats in My Kitchen" – Sleepy John Estes – 3:06
9. "She May Be Yours (But She Comes to See Me Sometimes)" – Joe Hill Louis – 3:03
10. "Baker Shop Boogie" – Willie Nix – 2:47
11. "Easy" – Big Walter Horton – 2:57
12. "Bear Cat" – Rufus Thomas – 2:51
13. "Take a Little Chance" – Jimmy DeBerry – 2:19
14. "Just Walkin' in the Rain" – The Prisonaires – 2:40
15. "Make Room in the Lifeboat for Me" – Howard Seratt – 2:35
16. "Feelin' Good" Little Junior's Blue Flames – 2:58
17. "Tiger Man (King of the Jungle)" – Rufus Thomas – 2:48
18. "Mystery Train" – Little Junior's Blue Flames – 2:23
19. "Come Back Baby" – Doctor Ross – 2:48
20. "Gospel Train" – The Jones Brothers – 2:20
21. "My Kind of Carryin' On" – Doug Poindexter – 1:58
22. "I'm Gonna Murder My Baby" – Pat Hare – 3:05
23. "Cotton Crop Blues" – James Cotton – 2:56

=== Disc two ===
1. "That's All Right" – Elvis Presley, Scotty and Bill – 1:55
2. "Good Rockin' Tonight" – Elvis Presley, Scotty and Bill – 2:12
3. "Drinkin' Wine, Spo-Dee-O-Dee" – Malcolm Yelvington – 2:50
4. "Turn Around" – Carl Perkins – 2:59
5. "Baby Let's Play House" – Elvis Presley, Scotty and Bill – 2:17
6. "Someday You Will Pay" – The Miller Sisters – 2:19
7. "Red Hot" – Billy "The Kid" Emerson – 2:25
8. "Lookin' for My Baby" – Little Milton – 2:53
9. "Cry! Cry! Cry!" – Johnny Cash – 2:28
10. "Sitting by My Window" – The Five Tinos – 3:25
11. "Mystery Train" – Elvis Presley, Scotty and Bill – 2:29
12. "Let the Jukebox Keep On Playing" – Carl Perkins – 2:55
13. "Defrost Your Heart" – Charlie Feathers – 2:27
14. "Folsom Prison Blues" – Johnny Cash – 2:49
15. "Blue Suede Shoes" – Carl Perkins – 2:14
16. "Honey Don't" – Carl Perkins – 2:49
17. "Let's Get High" – Rosco Gordon – 2:37
18. "Everybody's Trying to Be My Baby" – Carl Perkins – 2:13
19. "Rock & Roll Ruby" – Warren Smith – 2:52
20. "I Walk the Line" – Johnny Cash – 2:43
21. "Get Rhythm" – Johnny Cash – 2:13
22. "Ooby Dooby" – Roy Orbison – 2:12
23. "Red Headed Woman" – Sonny Burgess – 2:10
24. "Dixie Fried" – Carl Perkins – 2:26
25. "Ubangi Stomp" – Warren Smith – 1:58

=== Disc three ===
1. "Crazy Arms" – Jerry Lee Lewis – 2:44
2. "End of the Road" – Jerry Lee Lewis – 1:49
3. "Flyin' Saucers Rock & Roll" – Billy Lee Riley – 2:03
4. "Matchbox" – Carl Perkins – 2:09
5. "Down by the Riverside" – Million Dollar Quartet – 2:21
6. "Devil Doll" – Roy Orbison – 2:10
7. "Whole Lotta Shakin' Goin' On" – Jerry Lee Lewis – 2:52
8. "So Long, I'm Gone" – Warren Smith – 2:12
9. "Red Hot" – Billy Lee Riley – 2:31
10. "Red Cadillac and a Black Moustache" – Warren Smith – 2:40
11. "Raunchy" – Bill Justis – 2:22
12. "You Win Again" – Jerry Lee Lewis – 2:56
13. "Great Balls of Fire" – Jerry Lee Lewis – 1:51
14. "Claudette" – Roy Orbison – 1:57
15. "Breathless" – Jerry Lee Lewis – 2:42
16. "Guess Things Happen That Way" – Johnny Cash – 1:49
17. "High School Confidential" – Jerry Lee Lewis – 2:29
18. "Right Behind You Baby" – Ray Smith – 2:24
19. "Jump Right Out of This Jukebox" – Onie Wheeler – 2:21
20. "Lovin' Up a Storm" – Jerry Lee Lewis – 1:51
21. "Mona Lisa" – Carl Mann – 2:28
22. "Lonely Weekends" – Charlie Rich – 2:08
23. "Who Will the Next Fool Be?" – Charlie Rich – 2:24
24. "Jack's Jump" – Frank Frost – 2:14
25. "Don't Put No Headstone on My Grave" – Charlie Rich – 4:18
26. "Cadillac Man" – The Jesters – 2:36
