= Pink Cadillac =

Pink Cadillac may refer to:

- Pink Cadillac (film), a 1989 film starring Clint Eastwood
- "Pink Cadillac" (song), a 1984 song by Bruce Springsteen
- Pink Cadillac (album), a 1979 album by John Prine
- Elvis' Pink Cadillac, the singer's 1955 Cadillac Fleetwood 60 automobile
- Mary Kay Pink Cadillac, a gift by the Mary Kay cosmetics company for its top sellers
- A pink Cadillac
