= This Train =

Traditional American gospel song

Song by Florida Normal and Industrial Institute Quartette
- Recorded: 1922
- Genre: Gospel

"This Train", also known as "This Train Is Bound for Glory", is a traditional African-American gospel song first recorded in 1922. Although its origins are unknown, the song was relatively popular during the 1920s as a religious tune, and it became a gospel hit in the late 1930s for singer-guitarist Sister Rosetta Tharpe. After switching from acoustic to electric guitar, Tharpe released a more secular version of the song in the early 1950s.

The song's popularity was also due in part to the influence of John Lomax Jr. and Alan Lomax, the folklorists who discovered the song while making field recordings in the American South in the early 1930s and included it in folk song anthologies that were published in 1934 and 1960. These anthologies brought the song to the attention of an even broader audience during the folk music revival of the 1950s and 1960s. Another song, called "The Crawdad Song", uses the same melody.

== Early history ==
The earliest known example of "This Train" is a recording by Florida Normal and Industrial Institute Quartette from 1922, under the title "Dis Train". Another one of the earliest recordings of the song is the version made by Wood's Blind Jubilee Singers in August 1925 under the title "This Train Is Bound for Glory". Between 1926 and 1931, three other black religious groups recorded it. During a visit to the Parchman Farm state penitentiary in Mississippi in 1933, Smithsonian Institution musicologist John A. Lomax and his son Alan made a field recording of the song by black inmate Walter McDonald. The next year the song found its way into print for the first time in the Lomaxes' American Folk Songs and Ballads anthology and was subsequently included in Alan Lomax's 1960 anthology Folk Songs of North America.

In 1935, the first hillbilly recording of the song was released by Tennessee Ramblers as "Dis Train" in reference to the song's black roots. Then in the late 1930s, after becoming the first black artist to sign with a major label, gospel singer and guitarist Sister Rosetta Tharpe recorded "This Train" as a hit for Decca. Her later version of the song, released by Decca in the early 1950s, featured Tharpe on electric guitar.

== Other recordings ==
Over the years, "This Train" has been covered by artists from many genres, including blues, folk, bluegrass, gospel, rock, post-punk, jazz, reggae, and zydeco. Those who have covered it include Louis Armstrong, Big Bill Broonzy, Brothers Four, Hylo Brown, Alice Coltrane, Delmore Brothers, Sandy Denny, D.O.A., Lonnie Donegan, Jimmy Durante, Snooks Eaglin, Bob Gibson, Joe Glazer, John Hammond Jr., Cisco Houston, Janis Ian, Johnny Cash, Mahalia Jackson, Ella Jenkins, Sleepy LaBeef, The Limeliters, Trini Lopez, Bob Marley & The Wailers, Ziggy Marley, The Alarm, Ricky Nelson, Peter, Paul & Mary, Utah Phillips, Pete Seeger, The Seekers, Roberta Sherwood, Hank Snow, David Soul, Staples Singers, Billy Strange, the Tarriers, Sister Rosetta Tharpe, Hank Thompson, Bradley Nowell of Sublime, Randy Travis, The Verlaines, Bunny Wailer, Nina Hagen, Girls at Our Best!, Buckwheat Zydeco, The Paul Mirfin Band, Jools Holland, The Au Go Go Singers, Vaneese Thomas for the character, Grace the Bass from the children's TV show Shining Time Station, and Lifetree Kids.

== Alternate versions ==
The 1946 revue Call Me Mister, and its 1951 film adaptation, both about the end of World War II, include the song "Going Home Train", adapted from "This Train" by Harold Rome.

In 1955, blues singer/harmonica player Little Walter Jacobs released the single "My Babe", based on "This Train" but with secular lyrics. The song was a hit for Little Walter, and was later recorded by artists including Dale Hawkins, Bo Diddley, Cliff Richard (three times), and the Remains.

== Additional influences ==
The song provided the inspiration for the title of Woody Guthrie's autobiographical novel Bound for Glory. Guthrie also provided a version of this song referring to the fate of the dust bowl refugees who often had to illegally use freight trains to make their way west. The book was subsequently used as the basis for director Hal Ashby's 1976 film Bound for Glory on Guthrie's life, which starred David Carradine.

Sister Rosetta Tharpe's 1950s version of "This Train" was featured as a selection on Bob Dylan's XM Satellite Radio program Theme Time Radio Hour, during its first season in 2006–2007. The song, which was played on Show 46, "More Trains", was later released on The Best of Bob Dylan's Theme Time Radio Hour, Volume 1 on the Chrome Dreams label.

In mid-1970s in the USSR, Dean Reed made a TV clip version of "This Train" as a "gospel" of a kind in praise to the BAM - a grand Soviet Trans-Siberian railroad that was being built in that period.

The 1994 song "This Train Revised" by Indigo Girls, about the Holocaust, includes the refrain "This train is bound for glory", though with an alternate melody.

== See also ==
- List of train songs
