= Aimless Love =

Studio album by John Prine
- Released: 1984
- Studio: Alpha Studios (Burbank, California); Jack's Tracks (Nashville, Tennessee)
- Genre: Folk, alternative country, Americana
- Length: 35:44
- Label: Oh Boy
- Producer: Steve Goodman, Jim Rooney, John Prine

John Prine chronology
Storm Windows (1980)	Aimless Love (1984)	German Afternoons (1986)

Aimless Love is the eighth album by American folk singer and songwriter John Prine, released in 1984. It is his first release on his independent record label, Oh Boy Records.

== Background ==
Prine and his longtime manager Al Bunetta formed Oh Boy Records in an attempt to take control of his own music. In a 1985 interview with Bobby Bare on The Nashville Network, Prine explained that he'd been inspired to start his own label by Steve Goodman's modest success with Red Pajamas Records and named it "Oh Boy" because of how the expression is apropos for both good and bad situations. "There ain't no middleman, there is no like swarthy little character in Cleveland that gets the money from the people that want the music," Prine told Bare, "and then he takes most of it, twirls his moustache, and then sends me twelve cents." Aimless Love would be Prine's first album of original material since Storm Windows in 1980. In the years leading up to the release, he had settled in Nashville co-writing songs for other artists, notably the number one country hit "Love Is On a Roll" by Don Williams. Several of Prine's collaborators from this period, like Bobby Braddock and Donnie Fritts, would receive credits on Aimless Love. According to the 1993 release Great Days: The John Prine Anthology, "Aimless Love was finally released in 1984, the recording complicated by tight finances (it was cut at various Nashville studios, ostensibly during demo sessions), the mechanics of setting up Prine's own independent label, Oh Boy (the initial release was a 1982 Christmas single, 'I Saw Mommy Kissing Santa Claus'), and Prine's habitual low-speed approach to making records." The album was recorded at Alpha Studios Inc. in Burbank, California and was produced by Prine and Jim Rooney except for the track "People Puttin' People Down", which was produced by Steve Goodman. Prine's wife at the time, Rachel Peer-Prine, sings harmony on "Slow Boat to China" and takes a verse on "Unwed Fathers." Pianist Bobby Whitlock and harpist John Sebastian also contribute to the recording.

== Composition ==
Prine co-wrote six of the ten songs on Aimless Love. Prine later commented, "In Nashville it’s hard to avoid co-writing a song. If you have a beer with someone, the next thing you know they’re calling you up to co-write.” Several songs have as many as three writers, such as the opener “Be My Friend Tonight,” co-written with Cook and Playboy cartoonist, poet, screenwriter and children's author Shel Silverstein, and the George Jones-like tearjerker “Me, Myself, and I,” composed with Cook and Spooner Oldham. Prine also co-authored two songs with "Funky" Donnie Fritts. One of these, "The Oldest Baby In The World", was inspired by a story in the World Weekly News about ill children aging prematurely and some of the women Prine had encountered on the road. On the sleeve of his 1988 release John Prine Live, the singer noted that the girl in the song "is just trying to hang on to a shred of innocence. I personally love innocence." The songs "Aimless Love" and "The Bottomless Lake" had been kicking around for years – Prine had performed the original composition of "Aimless Love" on an episode of the TV show Austin City Limits in the 1970s – and comments in the Great Days anthology liner notes, "Love's just an aimless idiot walking down the street. You might bump into him or you might not. The song reminds me of an old Johnny Cash or Ernest Tubb song." Prine had performed "The Bottomless Lake," a song that was an amalgamation of old Prine family stories, on the 16 October 1976 episode of Saturday Night Live (still called "NBC's Saturday Night"). Prine also recalled in Great Days that "Unwed Fathers", his collaboration with Bobby Braddock, resulted from the pair deciding "that we were going to write at his house the day after the Super Bowl, I wrote down 15 titles, including one called 'Children Having Children' and 'Unwed Fathers'. I was reading the list off to him, and all the lights went on with those two. We kind of combined them and went right into it." The song would be covered by several artists, including Tammy Wynette and Johnny Cash. The socially aware "People Puttin' People Down" addressed alienation in America in the 1980s Reagan-era, with Prine commenting to David Fricke in 1993, "It's the only defense some people have. As long as you got somebody to look down on, you ain't on the bottom. So cold."

== Reception ==
Professional ratings
Review scores
Source	Rating
AllMusic	3/5 stars
Robert Christgau	B+

Although Aimless Love was Prine's first release not to chart, it received positive reviews upon release and remains highly regarded. In 1985, Don Shewey of Rolling Stone magazine wrote that Aimless Love showed that "John Prine, the elegant pop songwriter, is still in top form." Writing for AllMusic, critic William Ruhlmann wrote of the album "On this label debut, he is under no commercial pressures, but that seems to make him more low-key, less striking... his new sweetness, which is as winning as, if less impressive than, his witty older songs." Prine biographer Eddie Huffman called Prine's vocals "the best of his career to date" and lauded the song "Unwed Fathers" as possibly "the best since his debut, a character song that held its own with 'Sam Stone'..." "Prine fan Bob Dylan held Prine's "People Puttin' People Down" in such high regard that he covered the song in concert, with Prine explaining in the Great Days anthology: "I came out to the parking lot after the show, and there was the usual crowd. This mailman walked up to me and whispers, 'You want to hear a tape of Bob Dylan doing one of your songs?' I said, 'Sure!' He hands me a tape from Rome, Italy, with Dylan doing about 30 Dylan songs and 'People Puttin' People Down'. Great version too. Incredible. So I saw Dylan last year and told him about this tape. And he goes, 'Where did you get it? Where'd you get it?' I told him a mailman gave it to me. I'm sure he believed that."

== Track listing ==
1. "Be My Friend Tonight" (Prine, Roger Cook, Shel Silverstein) – 3:15
2. "Aimless Love" (Prine) – 3:07
3. "Me, Myself and I" (Prine, Spooner Oldham, Dan Penn) – 2:42
4. "The Oldest Baby in the World" (Prine, Donnie Fritts) – 3:05
5. "Slow Boat to China" (Prine, Bobby Whitlock, Linda Whitlock) – 3:46
6. "The Bottomless Lake" (Prine) – 3:42
7. "Maureen, Maureen" (Prine) – 3:16
8. "Somewhere Someone's Falling in Love" (Prine, Fritts) – 3:04
9. "People Puttin' People Down" (Prine) – 2:48
10. "Unwed Fathers" (Prine, Bobby Braddock) – 3:30
11. "Only Love" (Prine, Cook, Sandy Mason) – 3:29

== Personnel ==
- John Prine – vocals, guitar
- Charles Cochran – organ, upright bass
- Roger Cook – ukulele, background vocals
- Philip Donnelly – guitar, backing vocals
- Stuart Duncan – mandolin
- Chuck Fiore – bass
- Steve Fishell – pedal steel, backing vocals
- Donnie Fritts – piano
- Jack Grochmal – guitar, tambourine
- Glen Hardin – piano
- James Harrah – electric guitar
- Leo LeBlanc – guitar, pedal steel, bass
- Kenny Malone – drums
- Dee Murray – bass
- Tony Newman – drums
- Kevin Wells – drums
- Bobby Whitlock – piano, organ, backing vocals
- Bobby Woods – piano
- Spooner Oldham – piano
- Rachel Peer-Prine – bass, harmony and backing vocals, guitar
- Dave Prine – fiddle
- Jim Rooney – guitar
- John Sebastian – harmonica, autoharp
- Sandy Mason – backing vocals
- Jennifer Warnes – backing vocals
- Greg Prestopino – backing vocals
- Matthew Wilder – backing vocals

Production notes:

- Steve Goodman – producer
- Jim Rooney – producer
- John Prine – producer
- Allen Reynolds – engineer
- Hank Neuberger – engineer
- Curtis Allen – engineer
- Gary Brandt – engineer

== Bibliography ==
- Huffman, Eddie (2015). John Prine: In Spite of Himself. University of Texas Press. ISBN 9780292748224.
