= Bruised Orange =

Studio album by John Prine
- Released: May 16, 1978
- Recorded: January–March 1978
- Studios: CRC (Chicago, Illinois)
- Genres: Folk-pop, country
- Label: Asylum
- Producer: Steve Goodman

John Prine chronology
Prime Prine: The Best of John Prine (1976)	Bruised Orange (1978)	Pink Cadillac (1979)

Bruised Orange is the fifth album by American singer and songwriter John Prine, released on May 16, 1978.

== Recording ==
After the tepid reviews for his 1975 album Common Sense, Prine was disillusioned with his label, Atlantic, who he felt had not promoted the LP as much as they could have. Prine remained deeply respected within the industry, and even appeared on the new hit show Saturday Night Live as a substitute for the Beach Boys in 1976, performing "Hello in There" and "The Bottomless Lake" (Prine fan and fellow Chicago native John Belushi had lobbied for the singer). Prine signed with the singer-songwriter friendly Asylum Records for a three-album deal in 1977 and turned to his friend and fellow Chicago songwriter Steve Goodman to produce. Bruised Orange was recorded and mixed at the Chicago Recording Company between January and March 1978. Prine had done work on the new album with Jack Clement but, as he explained to Paul Zollo of Bluerailroad magazine, "I had made the record already but I didn’t have it. I worked with Cowboy Jack Clement, who was a huge mentor to me and the reason why I moved to Nashville. I moved there and we worked for three to four months, solid. And through all kinds of outside forces and things that shouldn’t have been going on in the studio, we didn’t get the record that we were playing every day. We really enjoyed making the record, but we didn’t get it on tape the way we were hearing it in the studio." Frustrated, Prine went to Los Angeles and spoke with several "big-time producers" but admitted to Zollo that had lost his enthusiasm for the project: "I talked to, Christ, twenty different producers, really great guys, great producers. Big-time producers. And I just didn’t want to do it. I just didn’t have the heart to do the record again. And Goodman said he would do it." The album features "If You Don't Want My Love" which Prine co-wrote with Phil Spector.

== Composition ==
In the Great Days: The John Prine Anthology liner notes, Prine claims that the inspiration for "That's The Way The World Goes Round" came from him being "kind of fed up with a lot of cynicism that I saw in people, even in myself at the time. I wanted to find a way to get back to a better world, more childlike. I immediately went back and started writing from a child's perspective." Prine was introduced to Phil Spector by L.A. Times writer Robert Hillburn and wrote "If You Don't Want My Love" with the producer at his house, recalling to Bluebirdrailroad magazine, "It happened on the way out the door. We’d been there for seven hours, jokin’, drinkin’. And by the way, when you go in the house, he's got two bodyguards on his shoulder. It was just craziness, you know...So I was leaving around four in the morning, and all of a sudden Phil sits down at the piano as I was getting my jacket on, and he hands me an electric guitar unplugged. And I sit down on the bench next to him. I played him 'That's The Way The World Goes Round', and he really liked it. He said, 'Let's do this,' and he played the beginning notes of 'If You Don't Want My Love'. And we came up with the first couple lines and he insisted that we repeat them. Over and over. He said it would be very effective. And we took 'That's The Way The World Goes Round' and took the melody and turned it inside out...And that was on my way out the door. And as soon as he sat down and had a musical instrument, he was normal. That's the way he was. He was just a plain old genius."

For the sleeve to his 1988 album John Prine Live, the singer wrote that he composed the album's opening track "Fish And Whistle" about a carwash down the street from his house because "I hadn't wrote a song in what seemed like years so one day I decided just to write a song about what was goin' on around me." The title song was inspired by a real life tragedy, as Prine later explained to Paul Zollo in 2009: "I liked the title, and the image, and I wanted to do something with that image without saying anything about an orange or a bruise in the song. It was based upon something that actually happened. I was an altar boy, and the Northwestern train tracks were not far from the church that I went to. I was going down there one day and there was this big ruckus going on at the train tracks. I had to go shovel the snow off the church steps before Mass. Because they’d sue the church if people fell and broke their legs. So I was going down there to get the snow and ice off. I went over to the train tracks. A kid who had also been an altar boy at the Catholic Church, I found out later, was walking down the train tracks. And evidently the commuter train came up behind him. They were taking him away in bushel baskets, there was nothing left of him. There were a bunch of mothers standing around, trying to figure out – cause it was Sunday morning and all their kids were gone and they didn’t know – they all hadn’t located their children yet, and they didn’t know who it was."

Prine also resurrected “Aw Heck,” written in West Germany more than a decade before, while “There She Goes” also contained a jaunty country sound that Merle Travis could have written, with lyrics that sounded like they reflected Prine's own crumbling marriage. Prine has often stated that he believes "Sabu Visits The Twin Cities Alone" is the oddest song he ever penned. It tells the story of Indian actor Sabu, who starred in the 1937 film Elephant Boy, and the culture shock he experiences on a promotional tour of shopping malls in the American Midwest in the middle of winter. In the liner notes to John Prine Live the singer marvels, "What a strange song. Who would want to write a song like this?" The album closer, "The Hobo Song," features an array of background vocalists, including Jackson Browne and Ramblin' Jack Elliott.

== Reception ==
Professional ratings
Review scores
Source	Rating
AllMusic	4.5/5 stars
Christgau's Record Guide	B+
The Rolling Stone Album Guide	3/5 stars
The Village Voice	B−

Bruised Orange received mostly positive reviews when it was released. Writing in Rolling Stone in 1978, Jay Cocks proclaimed that "Steve Goodman is likely the best and certainly the most congenial producer Prine has ever had" and added "No matter when you play it, Bruised Orange carries the chill of Midwest autumn beyond autobiography ... into a kind of personal pop mythology." The New York Times noted that Prine's gift is "to marry the unpretentious basics of folk musical styles and poetic imagery with an almost bizarrely exaggerated imagination."

Critic Robert Christgau was cool toward the album in The Village Voice, writing that "...Prine sounds like he's singing us bedtime stories, and while the gently humorous mood is attractive, at times it makes this 'crooked piece of time that we live in' seem as harmless and corny as producer Steve Goodman's background moves...", although he ultimately found Prine's "meaningful nonsense" comparable to and more impressive than Edward Lear's poetry.

In 1993, critic David Fricke wrote in the Great Days anthology liner notes that Bruised Orange is "very much an album about the light at the end of the hurt" and observed that the LP was "the highest form of praise Goodman could have given, a marvel of taut, confessional Prinespeak rendered with a seductive pop-folk intimacy and, on droll boppers like 'Fish And Whistle', a deceptive, whimsical bounce." AllMusic's William Ruhlman wrote: "Despite some brilliant songs, Prine's followup albums to his stunning debut were uneven until this" and stated that "Sabu Visits the Twin Cities Alone" was "perhaps the best depiction ever written of life on the road in the entertainment business." Prine himself remembers the album fondly for Goodman's saving influence, commenting to Bluerailroad, "I totally put it in his hands. And he handed me back a beautiful record." Prine biographer Eddie Huffman calls the album "a spare, acoustic-driven pop-folk rock record that occasionally veered uncomfortably close to Jimmy Buffett-style whimsy, but generally stayed on track."

== Track listing ==
All tracks composed by John Prine, except where indicated.

1. "Fish and Whistle" – 3:14
2. "There She Goes" – 3:24
3. "If You Don't Want My Love" (Prine, Phil Spector) – 3:05
4. "That's the Way That the World Goes 'Round" – 3:20
5. "Bruised Orange (Chain of Sorrow)" – 5:21
6. "Sabu Visits the Twin Cities Alone" – 2:53
7. "Aw Heck" – 2:20
8. "Crooked Piece of Time" – 2:52
9. "Iron Ore Betty" – 2:42
10. "The Hobo Song" – 3:31

== Personnel ==
- John Prine – vocals, backing vocals, guitar
- Jethro Burns – mandolin
- John Burns – guitar, backing vocals
- Sam Bush – guitar, backing vocals
- Bob Hoban – piano
- Bob Horne – keyboards, backing vocals
- Leo LeBlanc – dobro, guitar, pedal steel guitar
- Howard Levy – piano, accordion, keyboards, saxophone
- Steve Goodman – guitar, backing vocals, harmony vocals
- Tom Radtke – drums, percussion
- Steve Rodby – bass
- Sid Sims - bass
- Jim Rothermel – clarinet, saxophone, recorder, penny whistle
- Corky Siegel – harmonica, piano
- Mike Utley – organ, piano
- Don Shelton – backing vocals
- Diane Holmes – backing vocals
- Len Dresslar – backing vocals
- Ramblin' Jack Elliott – backing vocals
- Bob Bowker – backing vocals
- Jackson Browne – backing vocals
- John Cowan — backing vocals
- Kitty Haywood – backing vocals
- Bonnie Herman – backing vocals
- Vicki Hubley – backing vocals
- Bonnie Koloc – backing vocals

== Chart positions ==
Year	Chart	Position
1978	Billboard Pop Albums	116

== Bibliography ==
- Huffman, Eddie (2015). John Prine: In Spite of Himself. University of Texas Press. ISBN 9780292748224.
