= Ubangi Stomp =

Single by Warren Smith
- B-side: "Black Jack David"
- Released: 1956
- Genre: Rock and roll
- Label: Sun
- Songwriter: Charles Underwood

"Ubangi Stomp" is an American rockabilly song. Written by Charles Underwood and first released on record by Warren Smith in 1956, the song did not chart, but went on to become a rockabilly standard, covered by many artists. "Ubangi Stomp" – usually Smith's recording – appears on many compilation albums, including The Sun Records Collection and The Best of Bob Dylan's Theme Time Radio Hour.

"Ubangi Stomp" is a straightforward uptempo rock and roll song; the lyrics, not particularly belletristic (e.g. "Ubangi stomp, Ubangi style / When the beat just drives a cool cat wild"), tell in first person the story of a sailor who goes to Africa ("I rocked through Africa and... Seen them cats doin' the Ubangi stomp") and, enamored of the local music and dance, jumps ship to go native ("Then the captain said son, we gotta go / I said that's alright, you go right ahead / I'm gonna Ubangi-stomp 'till I roll over dead"). Some mixing of cultural stereotypes is seen when supposed Native American terms ("heap big", tom-tom) are mixed into the ostensibly African setting.

The Ubangi Stomp Festival, an annual international exposition of America roots and rockabilly music, takes its name from the song, as does the Ubangi Stomp Club, a Dublin organization that organizes and promotes roots concerts and gigs.

Saxophonist Earl Bostic released an instrumental piece titled "Ubangi Stomp" in 1954, but this has no relation to Underwood's song beyond the title.

== Notable recordings ==
- Warren Smith (single) (1956, Sun #250)
- Jerry Lee Lewis, on the album Jerry Lee Lewis (1958, Sun)
- Alice Cooper, on the album Lace and Whiskey (1977, Warner Bros.)
- John Prine, on the album Pink Cadillac (1979, Asylum)
- The Stray Cats, on the album Stray Cats (1981, Arista)
