= Elvis Presley's pink Cadillac =

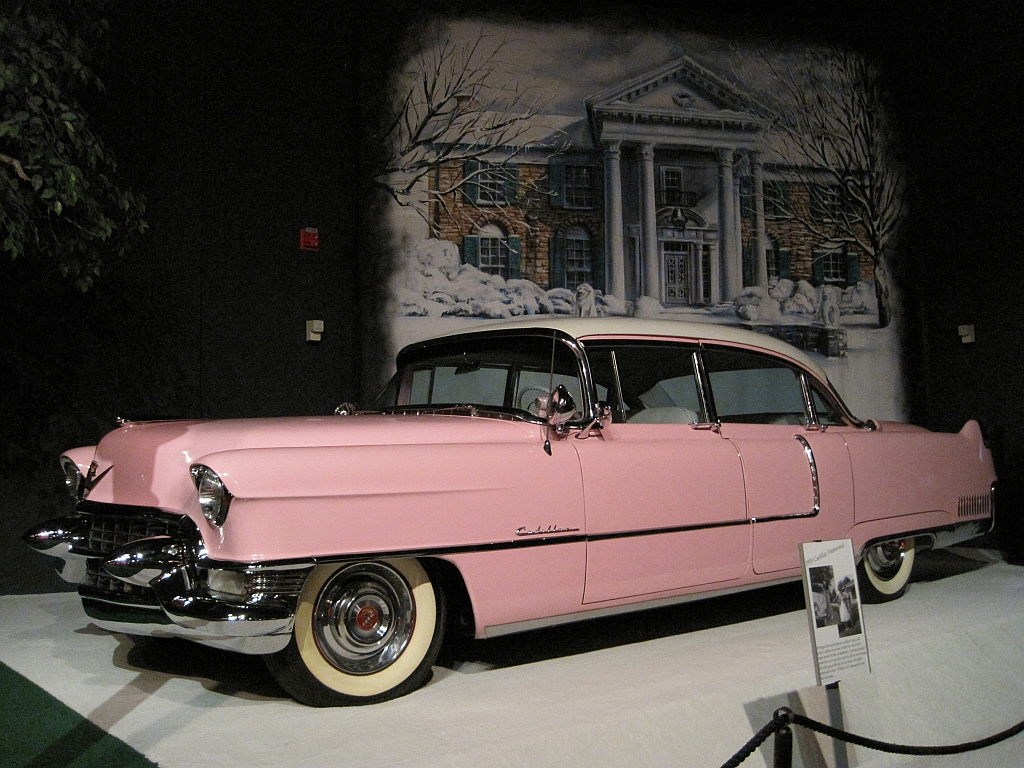

Overview
- Manufacturer: Cadillac
- Production: 1954

Body and chassis
- Class: Full-size luxury car
- Body style: 4-door sedan
- Layout: FR layout
- Platform: C-body

Powertrain
- Engine: 365 cu in (6.0 L) OHV V8
- Transmission: 4-speed Hydra-Matic automatic

Dimensions
- Wheelbase: 133 in (3,378 mm)
- Length: 227.4 in (5,776 mm)
- Width: 79.8 in (2,027 mm)
- Height: 62.1 in (1,577 mm)
- Curb weight: 4,700–5,000 lb (2,132–2,268 kg)

Elvis Presley's iconic pink Cadillac is a 1955 Cadillac Fleetwood Sixty Special. It set style for the era, was sung about in popular culture, and was copied by others around the world.

The car is now preserved in the Graceland museum, in Memphis, Tennessee.

== History ==
In early 1955, Presley bought his first Cadillac, a 1954 Fleetwood Series 60, which was the color pink. The car provided transport for Presley and the Blue Moon Boys, but after the failure of a brake lining, was destroyed in a roadside fire between Hope and Texarkana, Arkansas, on June 5, 1955.

On July 5, 1955, Presley purchased a new Cadillac Fleetwood Series 60 in blue with a black roof. Having mentioned a Pink Cadillac in the song "Baby, Let's Play House", the first song recorded by Presley to appear on a national chart which made #5 on the Billboard Country Singles chart in July 1955; Presley had the car repainted by Art, a neighbour on Lamar Street. Art designed a customised pink color for Presley which he named "Elvis Rose," but the car kept its black roof. Once the car was finished Presley gave it to his mother Gladys as a gift. Gladys never had a driver's license, and Presley drove the car with the members of his band for most of 1955–1956.

On September 2, 1955, Scotty Moore drove the car into a vehicle which was passing a pick-up truck in Texarkana, Texas, causing $1000 of damage. Having signed his contract with RCA in November 1955, in March 1956 Presley had the upholstery replaced, the body retouched and roof painted white. (As can be seen in the book "A Boy from Tupelo", from FTD/2012, in 1955 the Cadillac already has the white roof).

On his return from military service in Germany in 1960, Presley lent the car to his US Army buddy Joe Esposito, having bought himself a white with pink roofed 1961 Cadillac Coupe de Ville.

The original pink Cadillac remains on permanent display at Graceland, formerly under a carport for many years, and now resident in the auto museum. The car was once again brought to the front drive entrance of Graceland in June 2006, during the visit of President George W. Bush and Prime Minister of Japan Junichiro Koizumi.

== Pink Cadillacs in popular culture ==
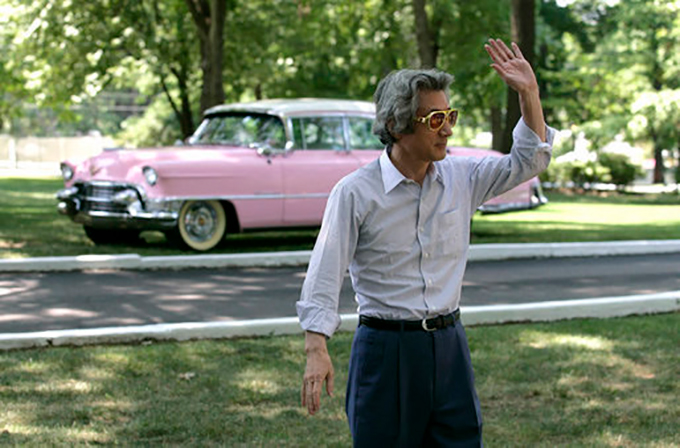
Japanese Prime Minister Junichiro Koizumi waves in front of Presley's Cadillac while touring Graceland with George W. Bush in 2006.

At the time, Ford Motor Co. was the only manufacturer to offer pink as a standard color. After the public attention to Presley's car, many individual car owners in the 1950s began to paint their cars various shades of pink.

Although the original car was a 1955 four-door sedan, the more replicated version in popular culture is a pink 1959 Cadillac Series 62 Convertible, which has been sold as miniature replicas by many companies including Franklin Mint, and featured in songs and videos about the pink Cadillac.

Pink Cadillacs have also been the automobiles of recognition for their top salespeople by Mary Kay Cosmetics.

Elvis Presley appears in the Hitchhiker's Guide to the Galaxy book series by Douglas Adams—he is depicted as driving a pink spaceship.

Presley's pink Cadillac was the inspiration for Robert Dunn's musical novel Pink Cadillac (2002). In the novel Elvis makes a cameo appearance, giving the heroine, Daisy Holliday, one of his pink Cadillacs as a gift after she helps him get it running.

Presley's pink Cadillac was featured in the CBS miniseries Elvis, where it shows him first buying the car for his mother.

== Krentzman copy ==
In December 2006 the historians of Graceland documented and provided 125 detailed color photographs of the entire car so that Bonnie and Stewart Krentzman of River Vale, New Jersey could re-create Presley's famous pink Cadillac in exacting detail. Pantone color swatches were used to match the pink and white exterior and interior paint. It was stipulated in the agreement with Graceland that this, the only "twin sister" and exact re-creation of the original car, would be offered at no charge to "pink ribbon" breast cancer fund-raising organizations to help raise money for breast cancer research and education. It has been estimated that close to 200,000 photos have been taken with this re-creation at breast cancer fundraising events. On occasion Diamond Joe Esposito, Presley's road manager appeared with the Krentzman car. The Krentzman car made its first appearance at Susan G. Komen's mother and daughter Color Me Pink Event in New York City in April 2007. It has since appeared at many Susan G. Komen, Avon and Revlon Walks in addition to being used by many grassroots breast cancer organizations across the United States.

== Songs and films about pink Cadillacs ==
- "Pink Cadillac," 1956 song by Sammy Masters
- Pink Cadillac, a 1979 album by John Prine
- "Pink Cadillac", a 1983 song by Bruce Springsteen, later covered in 1986 by Southern Pacific and in 1988 by Natalie Cole
- "Freeway of Love", a Grammy-winning 1985 song by Aretha Franklin
- Pink Cadillac, a 1989 film starring Clint Eastwood

== Gallery ==
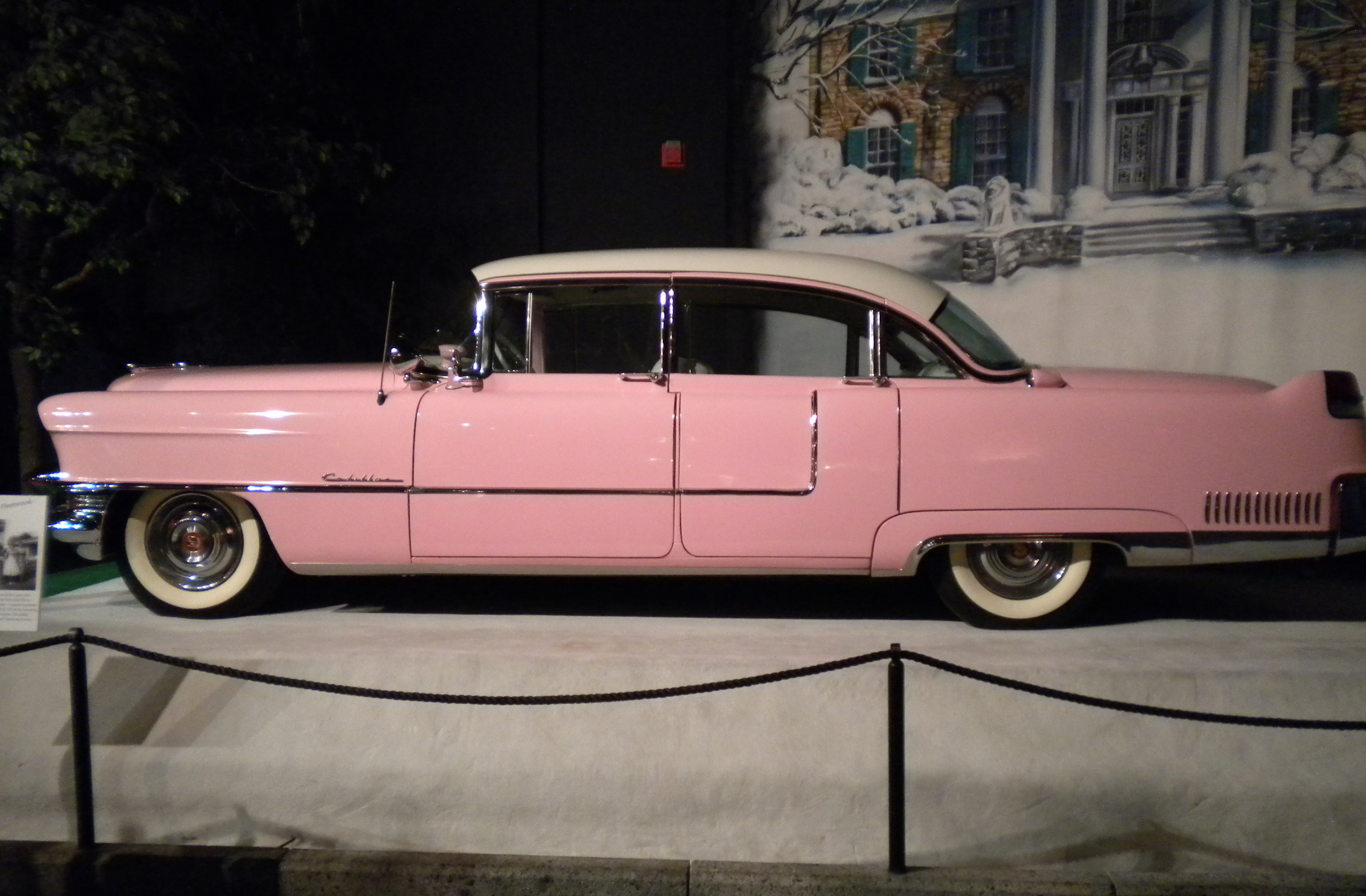
Presley's Cadillac on display in 2012

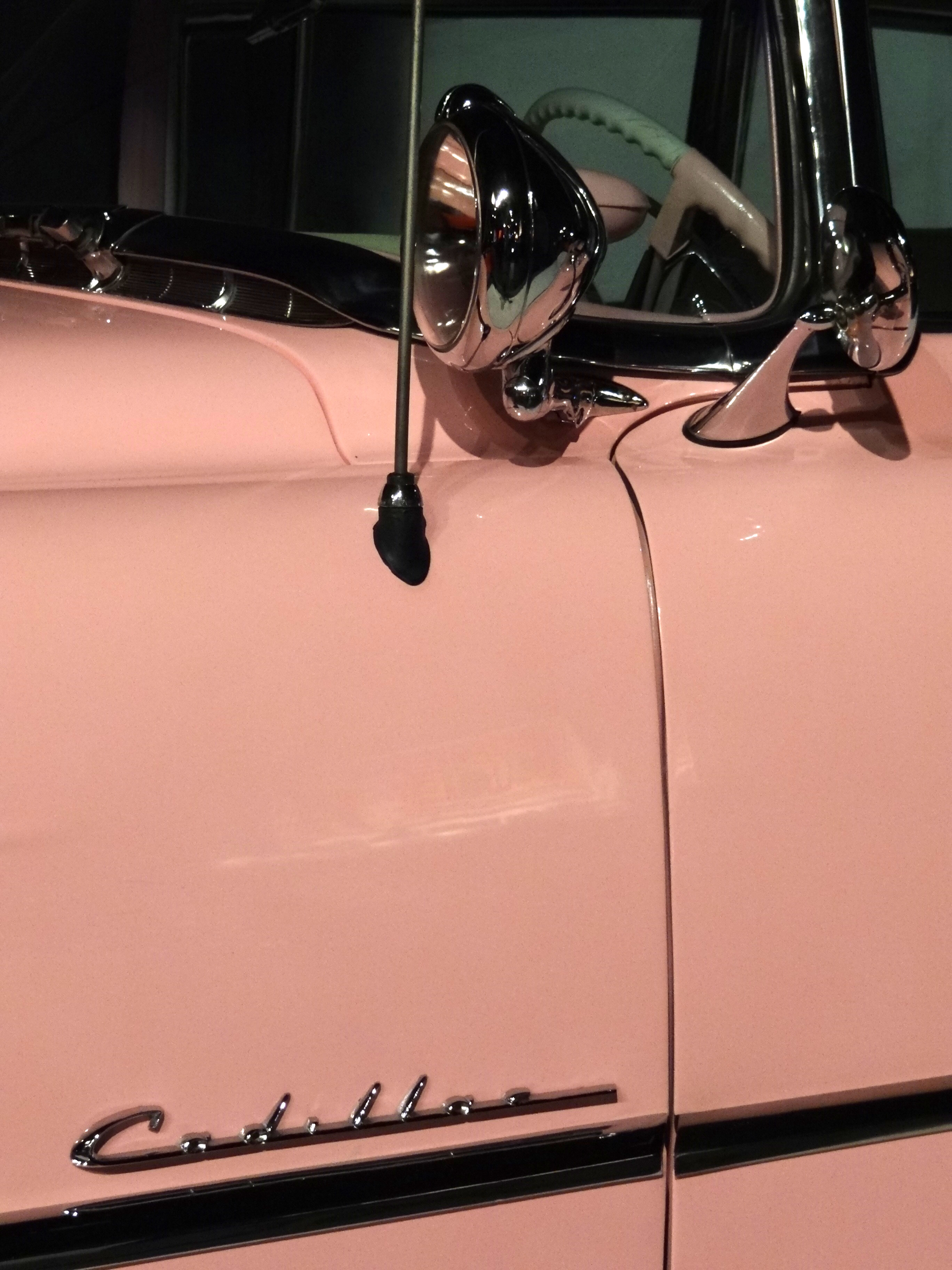
Close-up near the driver-side door

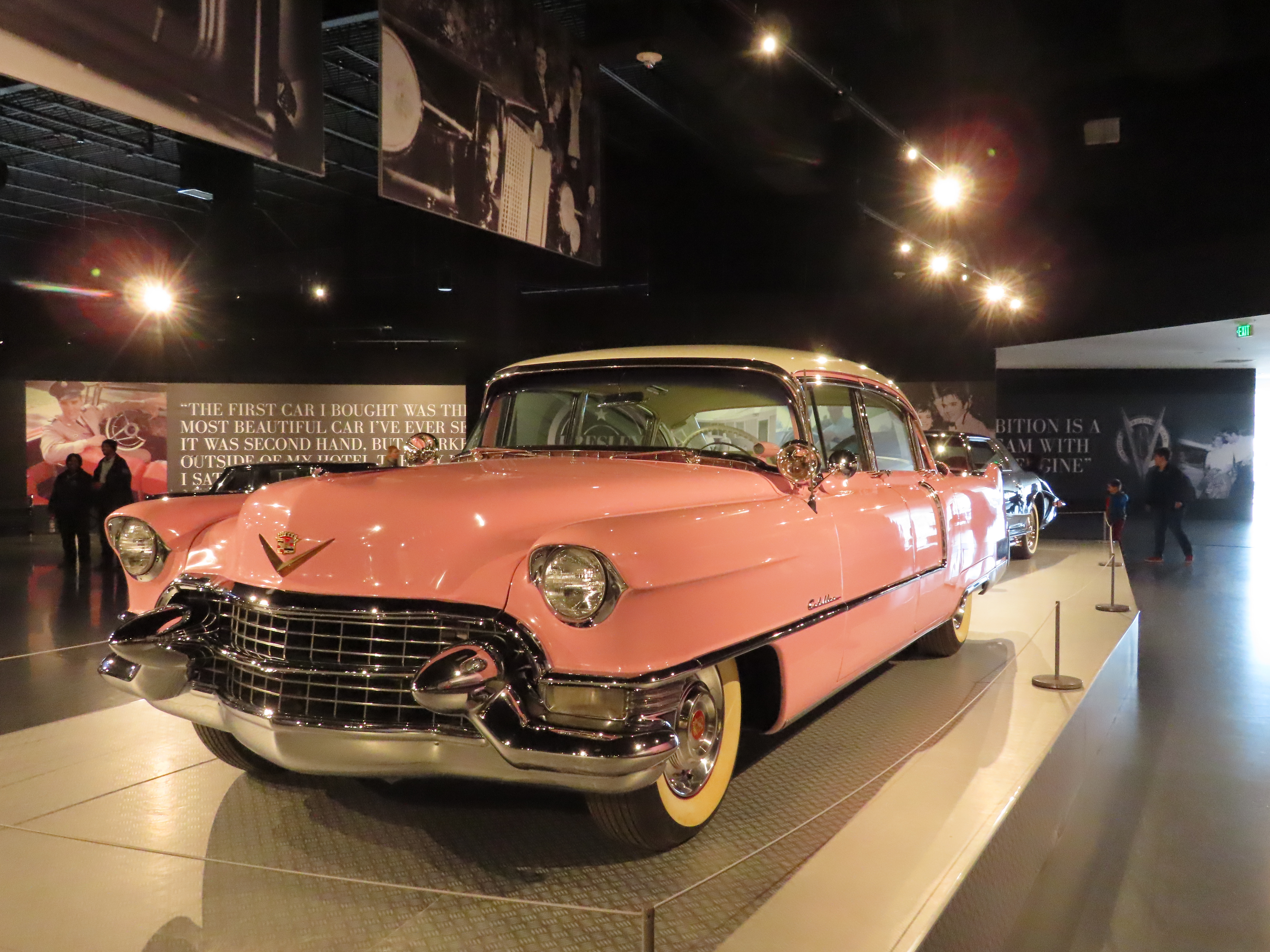
Presley's Cadillac on display in 2019

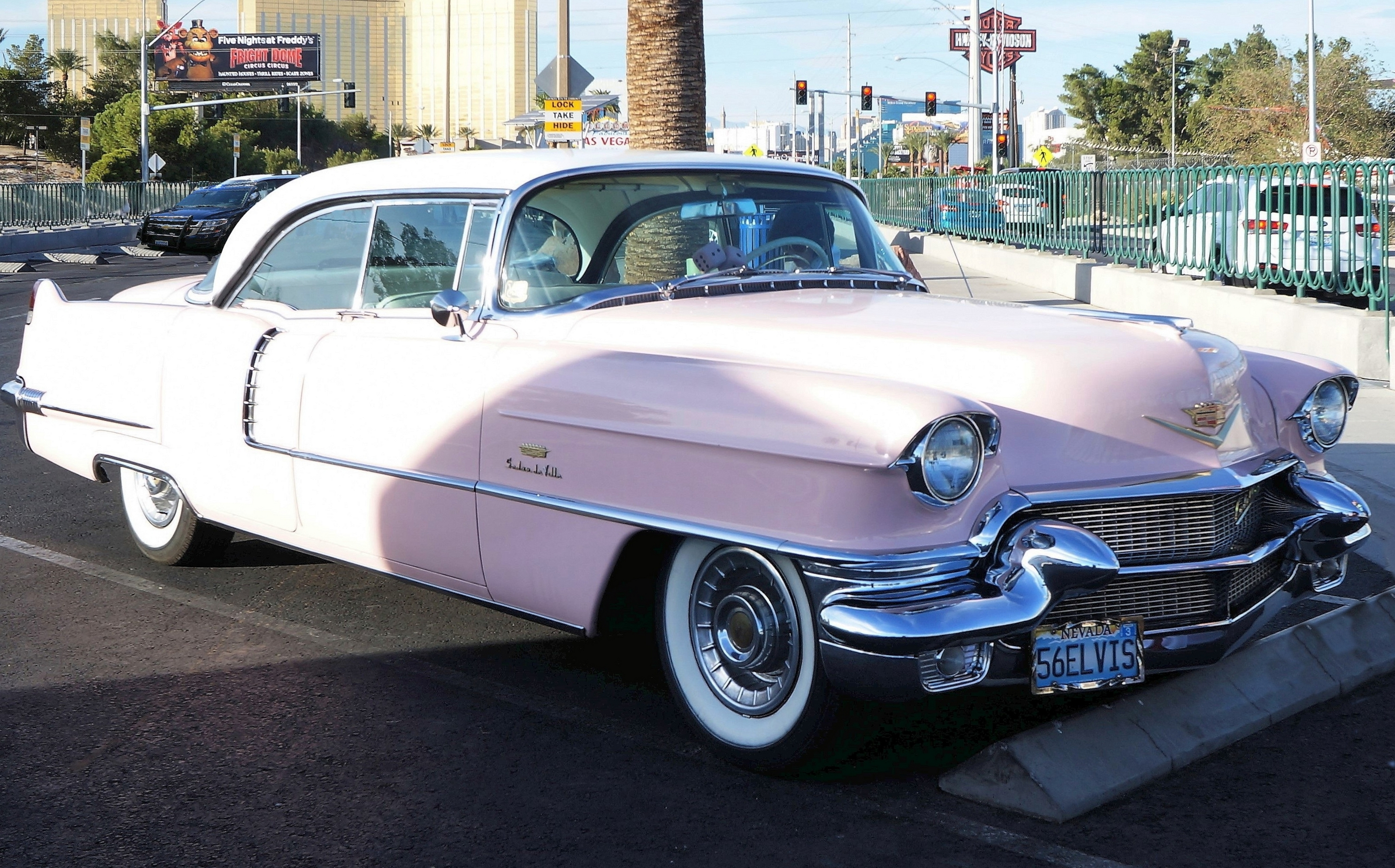
Presley's Cadillac on Las Vegas Blvd, Las Vegas, NV
