= Sonny Burgess (album) =

Studio album by Sonny Burgess
- Released: 1996
- Genre: Rockabilly
- Label: Rounder
- Producer: Garry Tallent

Sonny Burgess chronology
Tennessee Border (1992)	Sonny Burgess (1996)

Sonny Burgess (occasionally referred to as Sonny Burgess Has Still Got It, per its back cover) is an album by the American musician Sonny Burgess, released in 1996.

Burgess supported the album by touring with Rosie Flores.

== Production ==
Recorded in Nashville, the album was produced by Garry Tallent; he allegedly sought control over all aspects of the recording sessions. Dave Alvin, Steve Forbert, Radney Foster, and Bruce Springsteen, among others, contributed to the songwriting. Scotty Moore and the Jordanaires appear on "Bigger Than Elvis". Springsteen's contribution, "Tiger Rose", had not yet been recorded by him; he had to sing the lyrics over the phone for Tallent.

== Critical reception ==
Professional ratings
Review scores
Source	Rating
AllMusic	4/5 stars
The Encyclopedia of Popular Music	3/5 stars
Lincoln Journal Star	4.5/5 stars
MusicHound Rock: The Essential Album Guide	3.5/5 stars

The Washington Post wrote that "Burgess is still a rousing rockabilly performer, with a raspy baritone growl and a stinging guitar sound." The Orlando Sentinel thought that "'Hell Yes I Cheated' is the kind of country slow-dance they don't write often enough anymore... Burgess' economical guitar is particularly eloquent on Steve Forbert's 'Catbird Seat'."

Stereo Review determined that, "unlike myriad rockabilly nostalgists, Burgess is the real thing—and more often than not, he'll give you chills." The Lincoln Journal Star noted that the album "lacks the out-of-control feeling of his early music," but praised "the hard-country confessional ballad 'Hell Yes I Cheated'." The Chicago Tribune concluded that, "where younger practitioners accent the 'rock' in rockabilly, Burgess restores the music's loping country rhythms and backwoods drawl."

AllMusic deemed Sonny Burgess "a modern rockabilly classic." The Encyclopedia of Popular Music considered Burgess's voice to be "remarkably fresh-sounding."

== Track listing ==
No.	Title	Length
1.	"If I Could I Would"
2.	"Tiger Rose"
3.	"Big Black Cadillac"
4.	"Six Nights a Week"
5.	"Hang Up the Moon"
6.	"Bigger Than Elvis"
7.	"Didn't Know Love at All"
8.	"Leave Your Lovin' at Home"
9.	"Fast Train"
10.	"You Tear Me Up"
11.	"Lookin' Out for Number One"
12.	"Hell Yes I Cheated"
13.	"Catbird Seat"
14.	"Fly Right On By"
