= Prime Prine: The Best of John Prine =

Prime Prine

Compilation album by John Prine
- Released: 1976
- Genre: Folk
- Length: 43:41
- Label: Atlantic

John Prine chronology
| Common Sense (1975) | Prime Prine (1976) | Bruised Orange (1978) |

Prime Prine is a compilation album by American folk singer John Prine, released in 1976. It concluded Prine's run with Atlantic Records. No one associated with Prine had anything to do with the release, with the singer telling Goldmine in 1992, "A friend of ours in the art department called us one night and snuck us into the place...so we could at least look at the cover before it came out."

== Reception ==
Professional ratings
Review scores
| Source | Rating |
|---|---|
| Allmusic | 4.5/5 stars |
| Christgau's Record Guide | B− |

Writing retrospectively for Allmusic, critic William Ruhlman commented of the album, "Atlantic Records' compilation of John Prine's first four albums was good for its time...but was later superseded by Rhino's Great Days anthology."

== Track listing ==
All tracks are written by John Prine.

CD
| No. | Title | Length |
|---|---|---|
| 1. | "Sam Stone" | 4:14 |
| 2. | "Saddle in the Rain" | 3:30 |
| 3. | "Please Don't Bury Me" | 2:47 |
| 4. | "The Great Compromise" | 4:57 |
| 5. | "Grandpa Was a Carpenter" | 2:11 |
| 6. | "Donald and Lydia" | 4:27 |
| 7. | "Illegal Smile" | 3:10 |
| 8. | "Sweet Revenge" | 2:58 |
| 9. | "Dear Abby" | 4:10 |
| 10. | "Souvenirs" | 3:32 |
| 11. | "Come Back to Us Barbara Lewis Hare Krishna Beauregard" | 3:16 |
| 12. | "Hello In There" | 4:29 |
| Total length: | | 43:41 |

== Chart positions ==
| Year | Chart | Position |
|---|---|---|
| 1977 | Billboard Pop Albums | 196 |
