= Sweet Revenge (John Prine album) =

Studio album by John Prine
- Released: October 1973
- Venue: State University of New York, New Paltz, New York
- Studio: Quadrafonic Sound (Nashville, Tennessee); Atlantic (New York City)
- Label: Atlantic
- Producer: Arif Mardin

John Prine chronology
Diamonds in the Rough (1972)	Sweet Revenge (1973)	Common Sense (1975)

Sweet Revenge is the third album by American country and folk singer and songwriter John Prine, released in 1973.

== Recording and composition ==
Sweet Revenge was produced by Arif Mardin and was mostly recorded at Quadraphonic Sound Studios in Nashville. As Prine biographer Eddie Huffman observes, Sweet Revenge was a full-band LP recorded in Tennessee, but the singer had grown dramatically as a vocalist and recording artist over the previous two years. He sounded fully integrated with the backing musicians this go-around..." Two songs, "Blue Umbrella" and "Onomatopoeia", were recorded at Atlantic Studios in New York City while "Dear Abby" was cut live at a gig at New York's State University in New Paltz. "Dear Abby" was attempted in the studio but, as Prine told David Fricke in 1993, "The studio version of that was cut with a band, and it was real stiff and humorless. We cut it once, live, and that was it. That was the power of the song, in the way people would turn their heads the minute I'd get to the first verse, the first chords. That was the reason we used the live version." The album features many of the same musicians who played on Prine's debut album, along with Cissy Houston, who was a member of the Elvis Presley accompaniment group, the Sweet Inspirations, and Houston, Deidre Tuck, and Judy Clay sing with Prine on the title track's call-and-response sections, adding a soulful blend to Prine's ragged hillbilly edge. "Sweet Revenge" reflects some of Prine's frustrations with how his second album was received, commenting in the Great Days: The John Prine Anthology liner notes, "I'd quit my job at the post office, I had this album out that got incredible reviews, and then this second one where the critics started to hit me. I think it got under my skin."

In the liner notes to John Prine Live, Prine writes that "Mexican Home" was partially inspired by his father Bill sitting on his front porch in Maywood, Illinois, while "Grandpa Was A Carpenter" was his homage to his grandfather Empson Schobie Prine. "Christmas in Prison" mixed humor with pathos, romantic longing with some of Prine's most cinematic imagery to date. In the Great Days liner notes, Prine writes of the tune, "It's about a person being somewhere like a prison, in a situation they don't want to be in. And wishing they were somewhere else. But I used all the imagery as if it were an actual prison, with the lights swinging around the yard, the food tasting bad, making guns out of wood or soap. And being a sentimental guy, I put it at Christmas." "Please Don't Bury Me" was a rollicking country toe-tapper with some intricate guitar interplay but had been redrafted, with Prine recalling in Great Days, “That song was originally about this character I had in mind called Tom Brewster. He dies but he wasn't suppose [sic] to, like that scene in those old movies. The angels have to send him back, but they can't the way he is. So they send him back as a rooster. Which is why his name is Brewster. I ended up trashing that whole part and came up with this idea of the guy just giving all of his organs away, and I made a whole song out of that.”

The album cover is a far cry from the somewhat naive portraits of the singer on his first two LPs: a bearded, denim-clad Prine - wearing sunglasses and pointy-toed cowboy boots, a cigarette jutting from his lips - sprawls across the leather front seats of a 1959 Porsche convertible, the "first toy" the singer purchased with his record company money.

== Reception ==
Professional ratings
Review scores
Source	Rating
Allmusic	4.5/5 stars
Christgau's Record Guide	A
Encyclopedia of Popular Music	4/5 stars

Village Voice critic Robert Christgau wrote: "Prine is described as surrealistic and/or political even though the passion of his literalness is matched only by that of his detachment: inferential leaps and tall songs do not a dreamscape make, and Prine offers neither program nor protest. It's the odd actions of everyday detail - as in the "four way stop dilemma" of "The Accident" - that heighten the reality of his songs, and his elementary insight that social circumstances do actually affect individual American lives that distinguishes him politically from his fellow workers. That's why when he finally writes his music-biz takeoff it's a beaut; that's why "Christmas in Prison" deserves to be carved on a wooden turkey. Rating: A" Writing for Allmusic, critic Jim Smith wrote of the album "Sympathy takes a back seat to cynicism here, and while that strips the record of some depth, Prine's irreverence is consistently thrilling, making this one of his best. It's not as uniformly brilliant as the debut, but it did steer his music in a new direction — where that record is often hallmarked for its rich sensitivity, Sweet Revenge established cynicism as Prine's dominant voice once and for all. In 1993, David Fricke opined that the album marks "a swing back to the expansive textures of John Prine but with a harder edge, born of Prine's own increased confidence." Steven Stolder of Amazon.com writes, "This outing isn't as musically distinctive as Prine's other albums from his early period, but as collections of songs go, it's first-rate." Tom Nolan's 1974 review of the album for Rolling Stone was positive, calling the album "a more human work, more mature, and a step forward artistically and toward a wider audience," and "his best record yet."

== Track listing ==
All tracks composed by John Prine, except "Nine Pound Hammer".

1. "Sweet Revenge"
2. "Please Don't Bury Me"
3. "Christmas in Prison"
4. "Dear Abby" recorded live at State University of New York, New Paltz, New York
5. "Blue Umbrella"
6. "Often is a Word I Seldom Use"
7. "Onomatopoeia"
8. "Grandpa Was a Carpenter"
9. "The Accident (Things Could Be Worse)"
10. "Mexican Home"
11. "A Good Time"
12. "Nine Pound Hammer" (Merle Travis)

== Personnel ==
- John Prine – vocals, acoustic guitar
- Steve Goodman – guitar, backing vocals
- Ralph MacDonald – percussion
- Grady Martin – guitar, dobro
- Bobby Wood – keyboards, piano
- Kenny Ascher – keyboards, piano
- Steve Burgh – electric and acoustic guitar
- Johnny Christopher – acoustic guitar
- Cissy Houston – backing vocals
- Judy Clay – steel guitar, backing vocals
- Doyle Grisham – steel guitar
- Leo LeBlanc – guitar, steel guitar
- Mike Leech – bass, upright bass
- Raun MacKinnon – harmony vocals, gut-string guitar
- Kenny Malone – drums
- Hugh McDonald – bass, percussion
- Steve Mosley – drums
- Dave Prine – guitar, banjo, dobro, fiddle
- Jerry Shook – harmonica
- William Slater – bass, percussion
- Deirdre Tuck Corley – backing vocals
- Reggie Young – lead electric guitar
- David Briggs – organ, piano
- Arif Mardin – horn arrangement on "Often is a Word I Seldom Use" and "Mexican Home"

Technical

- Brad Davis, Jimmy Douglass, Steve Ham, Frank Hubach, Bob Liftin – engineer
- Ira Friedlander – album design
- Wendie Lombardi – cover photography

== Chart positions ==
Year	Chart	Position
1973	Billboard Pop Albums	135

== Bibliography ==
- Huffman, Eddie (2015). John Prine: In Spite of Himself. University of Texas Press. ISBN 9780292748224.
