= Pink Cadillac (album) =

Studio album by John Prine
- Released: 1979
- Recorded: January – May 1979
- Studios: Phillips, Memphis, Tennessee
- Genre: Rockabilly
- Length: 37:19
- Label: Asylum
- Producers: Jerry Phillips, Knox Phillips, Sam Phillips, John Prine

John Prine chronology
Bruised Orange (1978)	Pink Cadillac (1979)	Storm Windows (1980)

Pink Cadillac is the sixth studio album by the American musician John Prine, released in 1979 on Asylum Records. The working title was Storm Windows, which Prine used for his next album.

== Recording ==
Pink Cadillac was produced by Knox Phillips and Jerry Phillips. Their father, Sun Records founder Sam Phillips, produced two of the album's tracks. Recording took place at Sam Phillips Recording Studio in Memphis between January and May 1979. The album features Prine indulging his love for early rock and roll, with the singer telling David Fricke in 1993, "I wanted to do something noisy, something like if you had a buddy with a band and you walked into his house and you could hear 'em practicing in the basement." Although the album may have come as a surprise to some of his fans, Prine had recorded songs with rock and roll arrangements on his previous albums.

In the album's liner notes Prine wrote, "What we tried to achieve here is a recording of a five-piece band with a vocalist playing and singing good honest music." Later the singer recalled, "We ended up with something like five hundred hours of tape - and took the best of what we had, and Asylum just about had a heart attack."

== Composition ==
As Prine biographer Eddie Huffman observes, "For the first time in his recording career, lyrics were clearly a secondary concern; he was now focused much more on rhythm and the raw feel of the tracks. Prine wrote or co-wrote only five of the ten songs on Pink Cadillac, the singer opting to include some of the classic rock and roll songs that he had loved when he was a kid growing up in Chicago. These include Arthur Gunter's "Baby, Let's Play House", made famous by Elvis Presley, and Charles Underwood's "Ubangi Stomp". Prine was one of the first artists to cover the Roly Salley classic "Killing The Blues" and duets with Billy Lee Riley on "No Name Girl", a song Riley co-wrote with Cowboy Jack Clement. Pink Cadillac also contains a cover of the Floyd Tillman song "This Cold War With You".

In the Great Days: The John Prine Anthology liner notes, Prine recalls that "Automobile" was inspired by Elvis Presley's first record: "I think I was playing "That's All Right, Mama" on my guitar and putting my own words to it." "Saigon" tells the story of a Vietnam vet who is probably suffering from PTSD and is unsuccessfully adjusting to civilian life. "Saigon" and "How Lucky" features Sam Philips producing. In the A&E Biography episode on the producer's life Prine joked, "Sam thought my voice sounded so awful that he would stick around to see if he could maybe help fix it." Prine added that on "Saigon", Phillips intentionally blew the tubes out of guitarist John Burns' amplifier so he could get the sound of "pieces of hot metal flying through the air." In the Great Days anthology, Prine recalls that when Phillips "used the talk-back in the studio, he even had the slap-back echo on his voice. You felt like Moses talking to the burning bush."

The release of Pink Cadillac coincided with Prine's appearance on the PBS concert series Soundstage, where he is backed by his band performing several songs from the album, including "Automobile" (which features clips of Prine driving a 1950s-era car around the Maywood, Illinois, neighborhood where he grew up), "Ubangi Stomp", "No Name Girl" (again featuring Riley, who also performs "Red Hot" with Prine), "Saigon" and the nostalgic "How Lucky". Prine performs "How Lucky" on acoustic guitar with John Burns on the porch of his childhood home and offers a few thoughts on the song, asking Burns "Did you ever have a whole lotta growing pains when you got somewhere around the age of thirty? I never thought that age mattered much, I just thought that age was just something that was there every year, like Christmas...Seems like I started going back over everything I'd ever done and wondered if I wanted to do it for the next thirty or not...That's where this kind of started."

== Reception ==
Professional ratings
Review scores
Source	Rating
AllMusic	3/5 stars
Christgau's Record Guide	B−
The Encyclopedia of Popular Music	3/5 stars
MusicHound Rock: The Essential Album Guide	4.5/5 stars
The Rolling Stone Album Guide	3.5/5 stars

The album received mostly positive reviews upon release. The New York Times opined that "Prine is a talented writer and performer and the record is exceptional," concluding that "it's certainly Mr. Prine's masterpiece to date." The Los Angeles Times noted that "most of Prine's tunes rely on fairly standard folk, country or rock melodies, but the lyrics are captivating and he sings them with a conviction that is rare in an age of over-polished pop production." The Buffalo News called the album "an authentic roadhouse record," writing that "Prine's got what sounds like a rough and ready houseband."

Village Voice critic Robert Christgau wrote, "Prine has never rocked harder. But he's slurring his vocals like some toothless cartoon bluesman emulating an Elvis throwaway — related to the Sun sound, I guess, but perversely." Writing in Rolling Stone, Dave Marsh deemed it "an almost unqualified disaster" and insisted that Prine "has never sung such a half-assed grab bag of songs, partly because he wrote so few of them (and is in no way a classic interpreter of any material except his own), partly because the outside stuff he chose is so thoroughly mediocre."

Writing for AllMusic, critic William Ruhlman says of the album "Prine wrote only five of the ten songs... and even though the covers were of high caliber — notably Roly Salley's "Killing the Blues" and Arthur Gunter's "Baby Let's Play House," a song Elvis Presley did at Sun — Pink Cadillac was a good idea that went slightly awry in the execution. If Prine had had the songs as well as the studio, it would have been among his best." The album has become a fan favorite, however, with Prine revealing to David Fricke in 1993, "I get people now coming up and saying they're sorry for not liking it then, that they've gone back to it and really like it now."

== Track listing ==
All tracks composed by John Prine, except where indicated.

1. "Chinatown" – 2:24
2. "Automobile" – 4:23
3. "Killing the Blues" (Roly Salley) – 4:35
4. "No Name Girl" (Jack Clement, Billy Lee Riley) – 3:31
5. "Saigon" (John Prine, John Burns) – 3:16
6. "Cold War (This Cold War with You)" (Floyd Tillman) – 4:11
7. "Baby Let's Play House" (Arthur Gunter) – 3:30
8. "Down by the Side of the Road" – 5:03
9. "How Lucky" – 3:38
10. "Ubangi Stomp" (Charles Underwood) – 2:41

== Personnel ==
- John Prine – vocals, guitar
- Tom "Pickles" Piekarski – bass
- Billy Lee Riley – guitar, backing vocals
- Angie Varias – drums
- John Burns – guitar, backing vocals
- Leo LeBlanc – guitar, steel guitar
- Howard Levy – harmonica, keyboards, saxophone
- Jerry Phillips – guitar
- Helen Duncan – backing vocals
- Phyllis Duncan – backing vocals
- Beverly White – backing vocals
- Helen Bernard – backing vocals

== Charts ==
Chart (1979)	Peak position
Australia (Kent Music Report)	99
United States (Billboard 200)	152
