= Warren Smith (singer) =

American rockabilly singer-songwriter (1932–1980)

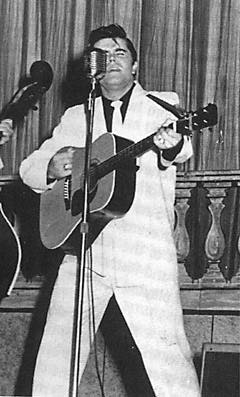
- Smith in 1956

Background information
- Born: February 7, 1932; Louise, Mississippi, U.S.
- Died: January 30, 1980 (aged 47)
- Genres: Country, rockabilly
- Occupation: Musician
- Instruments: Vocals, guitar
- Years active: 1956–1965, 1977–1980

Warren Smith (February 7, 1932 – January 30, 1980) was an American rockabilly and country music singer and guitarist.

== Biography ==
Smith was born in Humphreys County, Mississippi, to Ioda and Willie Warren Smith, who divorced when he was young. He was raised by his maternal grandparents in Louise, Mississippi, where they had a small farm and dry goods store.

Smith took up the guitar to while away his evenings while in the United States Air Force stationed in San Antonio, Texas. By the time of his discharge from the service, he had decided to make a career of music. He moved to West Memphis, Arkansas, and auditioned, successfully, to play the Cotton Club, a local nightclub. The steel guitarist Stan Kesler, who was playing there with the Snearly Ranch Boys, immediately spotted Smith's potential and took him to Sun Records to audition for Sam Phillips, with the Snearly Ranch Boys providing backup.

Phillips liked what he heard and decided that "Rock 'n' Roll Ruby", a song credited to Johnny Cash, would be Smith's first record. (Smith later claimed that the song was actually written by George Jones and sold to Cash for $40.) Smith recorded it on February 5, 1956. Phillips, playing it safe in case rock and roll did not maintain its popularity, released it with a country crooner, aptly named "I'd Rather Be Safe Than Sorry", on the flip side. By May 26, "Rock 'n' Roll Ruby" had reached number 1 on the local pop chart; this record, his first for Sun, went on to outsell the first Sun releases by Elvis Presley, Johnny Cash and Carl Perkins.

In August 1956, Smith went back to the Sun Records studio to record his second release, "Ubangi Stomp", an infectious rocker with crude lyrics and vocals suggesting an African chief with the syntax of a movie Indian. For the B-side, he recorded the classic ballad "Black Jack David", a song that originated in early 18th-century Britain and survived in various forms in the mountains of the American South; it may be the oldest song ever recorded by a rock-and-roll performer. Although a resounding artistic success, this record did not sell as well as Smith's debut.

In 1957, Smith recorded "So Long, I'm Gone", a song written by Roy Orbison. It became his biggest hit for Sun, peaking at number 74 on the Billboard national chart. But Sun had no cash to promote it, as Sam Phillips put every dollar Sun had behind Jerry Lee Lewis's "Whole Lotta Shakin' Goin On". Smith continued to make rockabilly records for Sun, including a cover version of Slim Harpo's "Got Love If You Want It" (recorded in October 1957), but these records did not do well commercially. Toward the end of 1958, seeing his future in country music, he cut a final record for Sun, a cover version of Don Gibson's "Sweet Sweet Girl". In spite of a review in Billboard calling it "ultra commercial", this record also did not sell well. Like other artists such as Sonny Burgess, Hayden Thompson, Billy Lee Riley and Ray Harris, Smith had little success on the charts. He then decided to leave Sun Records.

In 1959, Smith and his wife and son moved from Mississippi to California, settling in Sherman Oaks, not far from Johnny and Vivian Cash. Cash offered Smith a spot on his show, but Smith turned it down, seeing himself as a headliner, not a supporting player. In early 1960, Smith signed a contract with Liberty Records and immediately had a hit with "I Don't Believe I'll Fall in Love Today", which went to number 5 on the Billboard country and Western chart. This record and subsequent Liberty releases were produced by Joe Allison and featured one of California's best country session musicians, Ralph Mooney, on pedal steel guitar. Smith scored again with his next record for Liberty, "Odds and Ends, Bits and Pieces", written by Harlan Howard. He recorded several more tracks for Liberty, mostly cover versions of recent country hits, to fill out an album, The First Country Collection of Warren Smith. He continued to record for Liberty, with some success, and toured with his band, from 1960 to 1965.

On August 17, 1965, Smith suffered severe back injuries in a car crash in LaGrange, Texas. It took nearly a year for him to recover. By this time, his contract with Liberty had lapsed. He made several attempts to restart his career, first with a small, virtually amateur label called Skill Records, and then with Mercury Records, but addictions to pills and alcohol held him back. Eventually, he was convicted of robbing a pharmacy and sentenced to an 18-month term in an Alabama prison.

After his release from prison, Smith again tried to restart his career. He got some publicity from the rockabilly revival in the late 1970s. In 1977 he was invited to appear at London's Rainbow Theatre, on a bill featuring Charlie Feathers, Buddy Knox and Jack Scott. To his shock, Smith was received in London with standing ovations. His reception in England boosted his spirits and, upon his return to the United States, he began to perform with newfound vigor. In November 1978, Smith and fellow Sun alumnus Ray Smith toured Europe, again with great success.

Smith died of a heart attack, at 47 years of age, in 1980, while preparing for another European tour.

== Legacy ==
Smith's contribution to rockabilly music has been recognized by the Rockabilly Hall of Fame. Bob Dylan repeatedly featured Smith on his XM Satellite Radio show, Theme Time Radio Hour, playing Smith's records "Red Cadillac and a Black Moustache", "Uranium Rock", "Ubangi Stomp" and "So Long, I'm Gone". Dylan recorded a studio version of "Red Cadillac and a Black Moustache" in 2001; he also played that song and another recorded by Smith, "Uranium Rock", in concert in 1986. In 2015, "Uranium Rock" was also featured in the video game Fallout 4. "Uranium Rock" was also covered by The Cramps on their second compilation album "Bad Music For Bad People".

== Discography ==
=== Albums ===
Year	Album	Label
1961	The First Country Collection of Warren Smith	Liberty
1978	The Legendary Warren Smith	Lake Country
1980	Memorial Album	Big Beat
1981	The Last Detail	Charly

=== Singles ===
Year	Single	Chart positions	
Year	Single	US Country	US
1956	"Rock 'n' Roll Ruby"	—	—
1956	"Ubangi Stomp"	—	—
1957	"So Long I'm Gone"	—	72
1958	"Got Love If You Want It"	—	—
1959	"Sweet Sweet Girl"	—	—
1960	"I Don't Believe I'll Fall in Love Today"	5	—
1961	"Odds and Ends (Bits and Pieces)"	7	—
1961	"Why Baby Why" (with Shirley Collie)	23	—
1961	"Why I'm Walking" (with Shirley Collie)	—	—
1961	"Call of the Wild"	26	—
1962	"Five Minutes of the Latest Blues"	—	—
1962	"Book of Broken Hearts"	—	—
1963	"That's Why I Sing in a Honky Tonk"	25	—
1964	"Big City Ways"	41	—
1964	"Blue Smoke"	41	—
1966	"Future X"	—	—
1968	"When the Heartaches Get to Me"	—	—
1972	"Make It on Your Own"	—	—
1972	"I Don't Believe"	—	—
1973	"A Woman's Never Gone"	—	—
