= Common Sense (John Prine album) =

Studio album by John Prine
- Released: February 20, 1975
- Recorded: Ardent (Memphis, Tennessee); Larrabee (Los Angeles, California)
- Genre: Folk, alt-country, Americana
- Label: Atlantic
- Producer: Steve Cropper

John Prine chronology
Sweet Revenge (1973)	Common Sense (1975)	Prime Prine: The Best of John Prine (1976)

Common Sense is the fourth album by American folk singer and songwriter John Prine, released in 1975.

== Recording ==
Common Sense was produced by Steve Cropper and was recorded at Ardent Studios in Memphis and Larabee Studios in Los Angeles. The album features contributions from Bonnie Raitt, Glenn Frey, Jackson Browne and Steve Goodman. Bassist Donald "Duck" Dunn, who played in Booker T and the MGs with Cropper, plays on "Forbidden Jimmy" and "Saddle in the Rain". The album marked the first time Prine recorded an album on Atlantic without producer Arif Mardin, and critics took note the change in the Prine sound. In the Great Days: The John Prine Anthology liner notes, Prine insists Sweet Revenge "was a really good record, but I didn't want to keep making the same album over and over, do another 'Dear Abby.' I was really reaching on Common Sense, trying to do some different things musically." According to Eddie Huffman's book John Prine: In Spite of Himself, the singer was “perfectly content with the record he cut in Memphis. But Cropper was moving into the rock ‘n’ roll big leagues as a producer, working on Rod Stewart's next record around the same time. He decided Prine's album needed fleshing out. Despite the singer's reservations, Cropper took the tapes to Los Angeles and added the kinds of overdubs Prine said he wanted to avoid...”

== Compositions ==
For the sleeve to his 1988 release John Prine Live, Prine wrote that he began writing "Come Back To Us Barbara Lewis Hare Krishna Beauregard" "in the summer of '73 during a tour of Colorado ski towns with Ramblin' Jack Elliott. What I had in mind was this girl who left home, did drugs, did religion, did husbands, and ended up doing diddley." In the Great Days anthology, Prine explains the idea behind the title track: "It's a song about the American dream only existing in the hearts and minds of immigrants until they live here long enough for democracy to make them cold, cynical, and indifferent, like all us native Americans. It don't make much sense." In the same essay, Prine reveals that "Saddle In The Rain" is "another song about friendships and relationships, and being let down. Ever since I can remember, when I was a small kid, anytime I had a friend who really let me down, it would affect me. The disappointment was always large with me. So I guess that's why that's a theme I go back to every once in a while." "Saddle In The Rain" is one of only two songs from Common Sense to appear on the 1976 Atlantic greatest hits compilation Prime Prine (the other being "Barbara Lewis").

Like “Mexican Home” on his previous album, “He Was in Heaven Before He Died” was partially inspired by Prine's father, who died in 1971, and Prine later reflected on the song's opening line about “a rainbow of babies draped over the graveyard”: “Where do you go from there? I consider it a challenge, though, to paint myself into a corner and then get out.” The musical arrangements were more complex than they had been in the past, with Prine biographer Eddie Huffman noting that "Common Sense" used the common I-IV-V chord progression, though Prine "mixed it up with extra chords, as usual, stretching the music to fit the lyrics," while "Saddle in the Rain" "kept his sidemen on their toes, seeming to modulate between D and E minor," and "That Close to You" shifted from A to D in the bridge like a middle-period Beatles song.

As with his previous two LPs, Prine ends the album with a cover song, this time Chuck Berry's "You Never Can Tell". Although primarily known as a folk singer-songwriter, Prine was just as captivated by rock and roll in his youth as he was by American folk and country music, telling Paul Zollo of Bluerailroad, "I was coming of age just as rock and roll was invented" and cites Berry as his favorite because "he told a story in less than three minutes. And he had a syllable for every beat...Some people stretch the words like a mask to fit the melody. Whereas guys who are really good lyricists, have a meter so that the melody is almost already there."

== Reception ==
Professional ratings
Review scores
Source	Rating
Allmusic	2.5/5 stars
Christgau's Record Guide	A−

Common Sense received mixed reviews. Writing for Allmusic, critic Jim Smith says of the album: "Unfortunately, the cloying production overpowers the lyrics and relegates them to an almost cursory notion, and it doesn't help that Prine hasn't come up with much new material of note. His wit is still sharp, but it no longer shines; consequently, Common Sense has the unfortunate distinction of being the worst of Prine's Atlantic albums." Village Voice critic Robert Christgau was more enthusiastic: "Prine customarily strives for coherence, but this time he has purposely (and painfully) abjured it. He seems to regret this at one point--during a more or less cogent lament for a dead friend — but the decision was obviously unavoidable. It results in the most genuinely miserable album I've heard in years."

The chilly critical response shook Prine and marked the end of his relationship with Atlantic Records, with the singer admitting to David Fricke in 1993: "After Common Sense it seemed like all there was to write about was what was going on on the road. Which was nothin'. The whole initial rush had left me...I had to take a good look at everything."

== Track listing ==
All songs written by John Prine, except as shown.

1. "Middle Man" – 2:29
2. "Common Sense" – 3:07
3. "Come Back to Us Barbara Lewis Hare Krishna Beauregard" – 3:17
4. "Wedding Day in Funeralville" – 2:25
5. "Way Down" – 2:21
6. "My Own Best Friend" – 3:11
7. "Forbidden Jimmy" – 2:52
8. "Saddle in the Rain" – 3:30
9. "That Close to You" – 2:45
10. "He Was in Heaven Before He Died" – 2:12
11. "You Never Can Tell" (Chuck Berry) – 3:17

== Personnel ==
- John Prine – vocals, acoustic guitar
- James H. Brown Jr. (James Hooker) – piano, keyboards
- Peter Bunetta – drums, backing vocals
- Paul Cannon – electric guitar
- Tommy Cathey – bass guitar
- Mailto Correa – percussion, conga
- Jackson Browne – backing vocals
- Al Bunetta – backing vocals
- Pat Coulter – backing vocals
- Dan Cronin – backing vocals
- Steve Cropper – electric guitar
- Donald Dunn – bass guitar
- Steve Goodman – guitar, backing vocals
- Leo LeBlanc – guitar, steel guitar
- Alan Hand – piano, keyboards, backing vocals
- Larry Muhoberac – piano
- J. Russell – keyboards
- Steve Spear – bass guitar
- Rick Vito – electric guitar, slide guitar
- Greg Jackson – backing vocals
- Brooks Hunnicutt – backing vocals
- Glenn Frey – backing vocals
- Herb Pedersen – backing vocals
- Gwen Edwards – backing vocals
- JD Souther – backing vocals
- Bonnie Raitt – vocals, harmony vocals, gut-string guitar
- Jim Rothermel – vocals, wind
- Jim Horn – horn
- Lewis Collins – horn
- Jack Hale Sr. – horn
- Wayne Jackson – horn
- Jackie Kelso – horn
- Andrew Love – horn
- Chuck Findley – horn
- James Mitchell – horn
- Dave Prine – guitar

== Production notes ==
- Steve Cropper – producer
- Ron Capone – engineer, remixing
- Richard Rosebrough – engineer
- Barry Rudolph – engineer
- Stephen Innocenzi – mastering
- Paula Scher – design
- Bob Defrin – art direction
- Carl Marsh – strings, string arrangements

== Chart positions ==
Year	Chart	Position
1975	Billboard Pop Albums	66
