= Just Walkin' in the Rain =

Song by the Prisonaires
- Language: English
- Released: 1952
- Genre: Rhythm and blues
- Songwriters: Johnny Bragg and Robert Riley (two prisoners at Tennessee State Prison in Nashville)
- Producer: Sun Records

"Just Walkin' in the Rain" is a popular song. It was written in 1952 by Johnny Bragg and Robert Riley, two prisoners at Tennessee State Prison in Nashville, after a comment made by Bragg as the pair crossed the courtyard while it was raining. Bragg allegedly said, "Here we are just walking in the rain, and wondering what the girls are doing." Riley suggested that this would make a good basis for a song, and within a few minutes, Bragg had composed two verses. However, because Bragg was unable to read and write, he asked Riley to write the lyrics down in exchange for being credited as one of the song's writers.

Bragg and his band, the Prisonaires, later recorded the song for Sun Records and it became a hit on the US Billboard R&B chart in 1953. However, the best-known version of the song was recorded by Johnnie Ray on July 16, 1956 on the label Columbia Records; it reached No. 2 on the US Billboard Hot 100, and No. 1 on the UK Singles Chart for seven weeks. It became a gold record. Ray initially disliked the song, but sang it based on the recommendation of Mitch Miller. Ray's version featured the backup male vocals of the Ray Conniff Singers as well as a whistler.
