= Theme Time Radio Hour =

Satellite radio show hosted by Bob Dylan

- Genre: Music show
- Running time: 1 hour per episode, weekly
- Country of origin: United States
- Home station: Deep Tracks; XM 40; Sirius 16
- Starring: Bob Dylan; Ellen Barkin (announcer); Pierre Mancini (announcer)
- Created by: Bob Dylan; Eddie Gorodetsky
- Written by: Eddie Gorodetsky
- Executive producer: Eddie Gorodetsky
- Original release: May 3, 2006 – April 11, 2015, September 21, 2020
- No. of episodes: 102

Theme Time Radio Hour (TTRH) was a weekly one-hour satellite radio show hosted by Bob Dylan that originally aired from May 2006 to April 2009. Each episode had a freeform mix of music, centered on a theme (such as "Weather", "Money" or "Flowers") rather than genre. Much of the material for the show was culled from producer Eddie Gorodetsky's music collection.

Dylan would read emails from fans, take listener phone calls, play vintage radio promos and jingles, tell jokes, recite poetry, play taped messages from celebrities, and provide commentary on the music. Throughout the show, Dylan would claim that musical genres were constructed "ticky-tacky boxes" not to be taken seriously. The show was not live, taped at various locations and while touring; the "Abernathy Building" studio location mentioned was fictitious. Most of the "listener phone calls" and emails were also fictitious, although at least one email read on the show came from an actual listener.

== Original broadcast history ==
The first episode of TTRH was broadcast on May 3, 2006 on the Deep Tracks channel of XM Satellite Radio (now Sirius XM Radio). The show was originally broadcast every Wednesday at 10:00 am ET on Deep Tracks, with several "encore" repeats throughout the week on various channels, including an all-day airing on what was XMX Channel 2.

On November 12, 2008, Sirius XM revised its channel lineup, providing Sirius and XM listeners with access to programming on both networks, with TTRH airing every Wednesday at 11 am ET on Deep Tracks. Several channels on both stations were discontinued in November 2008, including XMX Channel 2, which had aired TTRH all day on Wednesdays.

The show was simulcast on DirecTV until February 9, 2010.

From 2006 through 2008, AOL Radio offered the show on "AOL Radio featuring XM" until XM Radio and America Online announced that their relationship was terminated.

From 2007 to 2009, the program aired in the United Kingdom on BBC Radio 2 and BBC 6 Music, and in Ireland on Dublin-based alternative rock station Phantom FM.

Season 3 of TTRH concluded with the show's 100th original episode on April 15, 2009. The theme of that show was "Goodbye". During an April 2009 interview with Rolling Stone magazine, Dylan implied that his contract with Sirius XM had ended, and that he had no plans to do additional episodes of the show.

In September 2020, SiriusXM announced that a 101st episode of the Theme Time Radio Hour would be produced and aired as part of a marathon rerunning of the whole series. The new episode, with a "Whiskey" theme, was being produced as a tie-in to Dylan's line of whiskeys, "Heaven's Door".

== Reruns ==
Sirius XM continued to air rebroadcasts of Theme Time Radio Hour on the Deep Tracks channel to the end of April 2011. At the beginning of May 2011, TTRH was replaced with the "Earle Bailey" show.

On July 25, 2011, Sirius XM issued a press release announcing the launch of a 24/7 "Bob Dylan's Theme Time Radio Hour" internet-only channel. The press release noted that channel would launch on Monday, August 15 on channel 801 on Sirius XM Internet Radio and would feature "every one of Dylan's classic 'Theme Time Radio Hour' shows." The release also noted "Sirius XM listeners will hear a show from the Theme Time Radio Hour vault on Deep Tracks, channel 27, on Mondays at 8:00 pm; Wednesdays at 11:00 am; Thursdays at 12:00 am and Sundays at 8:00 am (all times Eastern)," marking the show's return to satellite radio. The internet channel and radio rebroadcasts were discontinued in August 2013.

== Seasons and episode lists ==
Season 1 of TTRH consists of fifty episodes, airing from May 3, 2006 to April 18, 2007.

Season 2 of TTRH consists of twenty-five new episodes, airing from September 19, 2007 to April 2, 2008. Three episodes ("Halloween," "Leftovers" (Thanksgiving) and the "Christmas/New Year's Special") were repeats from Season 1.

Season 3 of TTRH consists of twenty-five new episodes, airing from October 8, 2008 to April 15, 2009. Three episodes ("President's Day," "Christmas/New Year's Special," and "Number One") were repeats from earlier seasons.

== The "Kiss" episode, 2015 ==
In early February 2015, Berlin radio station Radio Eins announced that it would broadcast a new episode of Theme Time Radio Hour, titled "Kiss," as a special episode of the station's Friendly Takeover series. The Radio Eins "Kiss" episode was broadcast on February 11, 2015 and later by SiriusXM and the BBC. Due to time constraints, both the Radio Eins and BBC versions of the "Kiss" episode were edited by the respective stations, and neither broadcast the complete hour-long show.

Show track listings:

1. "The Shoop Shoop Song (It's in His Kiss)" – Betty Everett (1964)
2. "Always Late with Your Kisses" – Lefty Frizzell (1951)
3. "Passionate Kisses" – Lucinda Williams (1988)
4. "Kissing At Midnight" – Billy Boy Arnold (1957)
5. "Kiss" – Prince (1986)
6. "Kissing in the Dark" – Memphis Minnie (1953)
7. "Kiss Tomorrow Goodbye" – Danny White (1963)
8. "Pucker Paint" – Huelyn Duvall (1960)
9. "Lipstick on Your Collar" – Connie Francis (1959)
10. "(Till) I Kissed You" – The Everly Brothers (1959)
11. "Let's Kiss and Make Up" – The Falcons (1963)
12. "Baby, Let Me Kiss You One More Time" – Roy Head and The Traits (1958)
13. "Last Kiss" – J. Frank Wilson and the Cavaliers (1964)
14. "A Kiss to Build a Dream On" – Louis Armstrong (1951)

== The "Whiskey" episode, September 21, 2020 ==
Dylan resurrected his Theme Time Radio Hour format when he broadcast a two-hour special on the theme of "Whiskey" on Sirius Radio on September 21, 2020.

Show track listings:

1. "Quiet Whiskey" — Wynonie Harris (1953)
2. "If the River Was Whiskey" — Charlie Poole (1930)
3. "Whiskey River" — Willie Nelson (1973)
4. "Bottleneck Blues" (excerpt) — Sylvester Weaver and Walter Beasley (1927)
5. "Whiskey Sununu Odia" (aka "Whiskey Sonn Onuo Da") — Edmund Tagoe and Frank Essien (1929)
6. "He's Got All the Whiskey" — Bobby Charles (1972)
7. "Good Whiskey (And a Bad Woman)" — Timmie Rogers (1946)
8. "The Whiskey Makes You Sweeter" — Laura Cantrell (2000)
9. "Drinking Again" — Frank Sinatra (1967)
10. "I've Been Drinking" (excerpt) — Jeff Beck / Rod Stewart (1968)
11. "Corn Whiskey" — Jimmy Witherspoon (1952)
12. "Ain't That Whiskey Hot" — Billie Harbert (1954)
13. "One Scotch, One Bourbon, One Beer" — Alfred Brown (1968)
14. "Rye Whiskey" — Harry Choates (1948)
15. "Coming through the Rye" — John C. Reilly (2020)
16. "Coming Through the Rye" — Julie London (1959)
17. "Mountain Dew" — The Stanley Brothers (1960)
18. "Moonshine Whiskey" — Van Morrison (1971)
19. "Bourbon from Heaven" (excerpt) — Dean Martin (1964?)
20. "Mack the Knife" (excerpt )— Louis Armstrong (1955)
21. "Alabama Song (Whiskey Bar)" — Lotte Lenya (1930)
22. "Jockey Full of Bourbon"— Tom Waits (1985)
23. "Tennessee Whiskey" — George Jones (1983)
24. "Whiskey in the Jar" — Thin Lizzy (1972)
25. "The Parting Glass" — The Clancy Brothers (1959)
26. "Hangover Blues" — Byllye Williams (1954)
27. "Tuff" (excerpt) — Ace Cannon (1962)
28. "Let's Go to the Liquor Store" — Tuff Green (1949)
29. "Top Cat" (underscore) — Hoyt Curtin (1961)

== Credits ==
Although uncredited in the closing credits, actress Ellen Barkin read the opening "Night/Night time in the Big City" introduction for each episode during the first two seasons of the show, with the exception of the Season 1 Halloween episode (read by comedian Steven Wright). Barkin read the "Big City" intro intermittently during Season 3.

The production credits were usually read at the close of each show. The usual theme music played under the closing credits was "Top Cat (Underscore)" which can be found on the CD compilation Tunes from the Toons: The Best of Hanna-Barbera, issued in 1996 and reissued in 2002. The music is an acoustic version of the theme song from the 1960s cartoon Top Cat. The show's usual credits were as follows:

- Host: Bob Dylan
- Producer: Eddie Gorodetsky
- Associate Producer: Season 1 – Sonny Webster. Season 2 – Ben Rollins. Season 3 – Nina Fitzgerald-Washington
- Continuity: "Eats" (spelling unknown) Martin
- Editor: Damian Rodriguez
- Supervising Editor: Rob Macomber
- Research Team: Diane Lapson, Bernie Bernstein
- Additional Research: Season 1 – Lynne Sheridan, Kimberly Williams, Robert Bower. Seasons 2 and 3 – April Hayes, Callie Gladman, Terrence Michaels, Sean Patrick, and Lynne Sheridan
- Librarian: Seasons 2 and 3 – Robert Bower
- Production Coordinator: Seasons 2 and 3 – Debbie Sweeney
- Production Assistance: Jim McBean
- Special Thanks to: Randy Ezratty, Coco Shinomiya, Samson's Diner and Lee Abrams (Season 3)
- Studio Engineer: Tex Carbone (changed to Director of Studio Operations midway through Season 2 and continuing through Season 3)
- For XM Radio: Lee Abrams (Seasons 1 and 2)
- Location: Announced as "Recorded in Studio B, the Abernathy Building" – a fictitious location. (Season 2 modified this to "Recorded in Studio B, in the historic Abernathy Building". Season 3 had several variations on the line including "take the tour", "crown jewel of the city skyline", and "on the 8th floor".)
- A Greywater Park Production in Association with Big Red Tree
- Announcer: "Pierre Mancini" (suspected to be the voice of Producer Eddie Gorodetsky)

== Reception ==
The show received positive reviews. Terry Teachout wrote in The Wall Street Journal that "[to] listen to Theme Time Radio Hour is to rediscover the sense of musical adventure that old-fashioned disc jockeys with strongly individual personalities offered in the days before big-money stations pinned their fiscal hopes to the rigid Top 40-style playlists that took the fun out of radio". Linton Weeks, writing for The Washington Post, praised Dylan's hosting qualities, calling him "voluble, generous, articulate. He's liable to quote a poem, give tips on hanging drywall, pass along a recipe".

== See also ==
- The Best of Bob Dylan's Theme Time Radio Hour
