= Sonny Burgess =

American rockabilly guitarist and singer

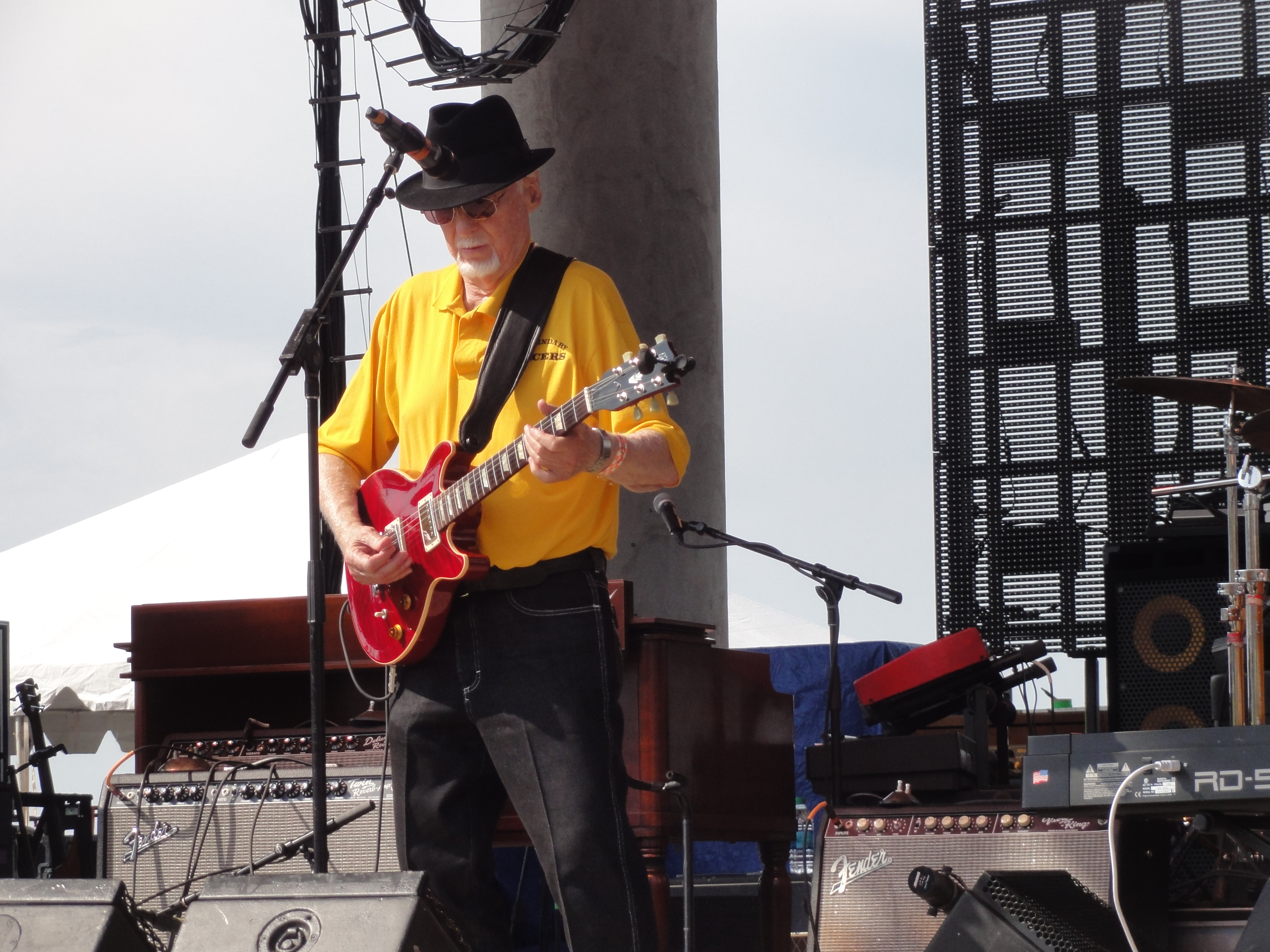
- Burgess playing at Riverfest in Little Rock, Arkansas, 2013

Background information
- Born: Albert Austin Burgess; May 28, 1929; Newport, Arkansas, U.S.
- Died: August 18, 2017 (aged 88) Little Rock, Arkansas, U.S.
- Genres: Boogie-woogie, rockabilly
- Occupations: Musician, singer
- Instrument: Guitar
- Formerly of: Rocky Road Ramblers

Albert Austin "Sonny" Burgess (May 28, 1929 – August 18, 2017) was an American rockabilly guitarist and singer.

== Biography ==
Burgess was born on a farm near Newport, Arkansas to Albert and Esta Burgess. He graduated from Newport High School in 1948. In the early 1950s, Burgess played boogie woogie music in dance halls and bars around Newport. Burgess, Kern Kennedy, Johnny Ray Hubbard, and Gerald Jackson formed a boogie-woogie band they called the Rocky Road Ramblers. In 1954, following a stint in the US Army (1951–53), Burgess re-formed the band, calling them the Moonlighters after the Silver Moon Club in Newport, where they performed regularly. After advice from record producer Sam Phillips, the group expanded to form the Pacers.

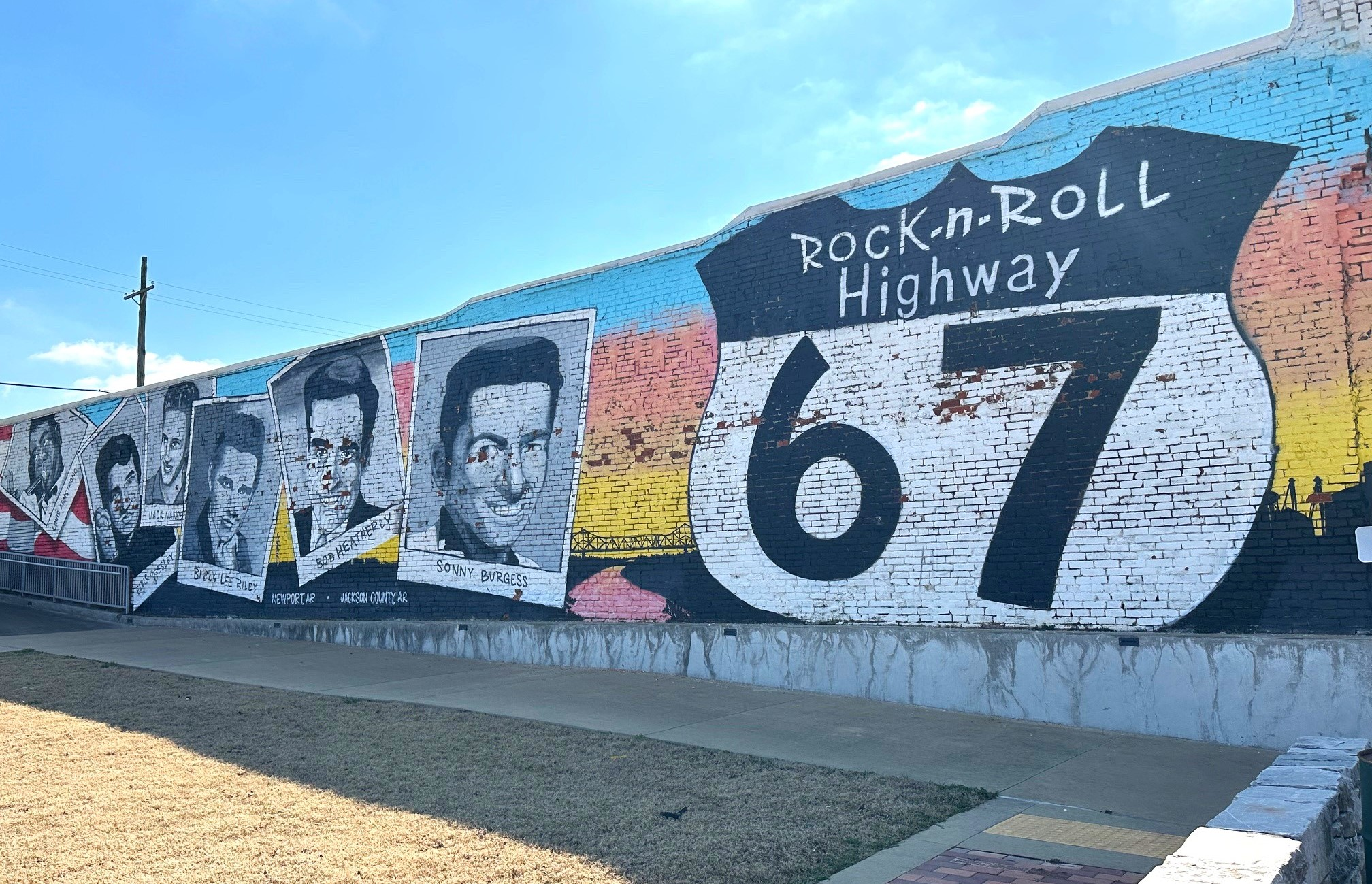
Rock-n-Roll Highway mural w/Sonny Burgess, Newport AR, 2-2025

The band's first record was "Red Headed Woman" in 1956 for Sun Records, in Memphis, about 80 miles southeast of his birthplace. The flip side was "We Wanna Boogie." Both were written by Burgess. The songs have been described as "among the most raucous, energy-filled recordings released during the first flowering of rock and roll." Their onstage antics in performance were similarly described. Like other artists such as Ray Harris, Hayden Thompson, Billy Lee Riley, and Warren Smith, chart success largely eluded him. Burgess disbanded the group in 1971 but later found a new audience in Europe.

Burgess was inducted into the Rock and Roll Hall of Fame of Europe in 1999. His group, now called The Legendary Pacers, was a hit that same year in a rockabilly concert in Las Vegas, Nevada. It recorded Still Rockin' and Rollin' in 2000, voted the best new album in the country and roots field in Europe. The group was inducted in 2002 into the Rockabilly Hall of Fame.

Sonny Burgess & The Legendary Pacers performed at the 2006 National Folk Festival in Richmond, Virginia.

Burgess hosted a weekly radio program called We Wanna Boogie with co-host June Taylor. The program, named after his first record, aired on Sunday nights from 5-7pm Central Time on 91.9FM KASU in Jonesboro, Arkansas.

== Personal life ==
External videos
- Oral History, Sonny Burgess reflects on his first guitar, a Gene Autry flat top he purchased for $3.25. Interview date September 23, 2006, NAMM (National Association of Music Merchants) Oral History Library

Burgess had two brothers and three sisters. He married Joann Adams in 1956 and they had two sons, Peyton and John.

In July 2017, Burgess suffered a fall at his home. He died the following month in Little Rock, Arkansas hospital, at the age of 88.

== Selected discography ==
- Country Rock (1969)
- The Old Gang (1976)
- We Wanna Boogie (1984)
- Sonny Burgess and the Pacers (1985)
- Raw Deal (1986)
- Spellbound (1986)
- We Wanna Boogie (Best-of compilation) (1989)
- I'm Still Here (1990)
- The Razorback Rock & Roll Tapes (with Bobby Crafford) (1992)
- Tennessee Border (with Dave Alvin) (1992)
- Hittin' That Jug (Best-of compilation) (1995)
- The Arkansas Wild Man (Sun Records recordings) (1995)
- Sonny Burgess (1996)
- God's Holy Light (1997)
- Tupelo Connection (2001)
- Back to Sun Records (2003)
- Tear It Up! (2006)
- Gijon Stomp! (2009)
- Live at Sun Studios (2012)
