= The Prisonaires =

American doo-wop group

- Origin: Tennessee, United States
- Genres: Blues, gospel
- Years active: 1953–1955
- Label: Sun
- Past members: Johnny Bragg; John Drue; Marcell Sanders; William Stewart; Ed Thurman

The Prisonaires were an American doo-wop group, whose hit "Just Walkin' in the Rain" was released on Sun Records in 1953, while the group was incarcerated in the Tennessee State Penitentiary in Nashville. The group was led by Johnny Bragg (born February 26, 1925), who had been a penitentiary inmate since 1943 when, at the age of 17, he was convicted of six charges of rape, which were later recanted or considered falsified. The Prisonaires were formed when Bragg joined up with two prison gospel singers, Ed Thurman and William Stewart (each of whom was doing 99 years for murder), and two new penitentiary arrivals, John Drue Jr. (three years for larceny) and Marcell Sanders (one-to-five years for involuntary manslaughter).

== History ==
The group was discovered by the radio producer Joe Calloway, who heard them singing while preparing a news broadcast from the prison. He arranged for the group to perform on the radio, a performance which was eventually brought to the attention of Sam Phillips of Sun Records. He arranged for the group to be transported under armed guard to Memphis to record. A few weeks later, "Just Walkin' in the Rain" was released and eventually sold 250,000 copies.

Their success was such that they were allowed out on day passes to tour throughout the state of Tennessee. The band became favorites of the state's governor, Frank G. Clement, and frequently performed at his mansion.

The group's legacy was confirmed when "Just Walkin' in the Rain", written by Bragg, was recorded by Johnnie Ray, whose version sold over eight times that of the Prisonaires.

When Bragg's sentence was commuted in 1956, he formed a new group including Hal Hebb, Willy Wilson, Al Brooks and Henry "Dishrag" Jones, who were known as the Sunbeams. When they were rechristened as the Marigolds they had a No. 8 hit in the US R&B chart with "Rollin' Stone" on Decca Records. In 1960, he was unfairly sent back to jail on trumped up charges. This saw him returned to jail for six and a half years. Putting together another group called the Prisonaires, they did not record any material. Upon his further release, Bragg worked in a cemetery.

== Deaths ==
Stewart died of a drug overdose in a Florida motel in 1959, Sanders died in the late 1960s, Thurman was killed in an accident in 1973 and Drue died of cancer in 1977.

Bragg died of cancer in 2004.

== In popular culture ==
In Jonathan Lethem's 2003 novel The Fortress of Solitude, part 3 is entitled "Prisonaires". Chapter 2 of this section of the novel features Dylan Ebdus, the novel's main protagonist and a rock critic, pitching a dramatic film based on the story of the Prisonaires to an executive at DreamWorks Studios. The executive initially seems excited by the idea of the film until he learns from Ebdus that Johnny Bragg is (in 1999) still alive, creating potential problems in optioning the rights to the story.

== Bibliography ==
- The Mistakes of Yesterday, the Hopes of Tomorrow: The Story of the Prisonaires, John Dougan, 2012, University of Massachusetts Press, ISBN 9781558499683
