= Leo LeBlanc =

American musician

Leo LeBlanc (May 27, 1939 – April 2, 1995) was an American musician. He played the pedal steel guitar and dobro, primarily playing country music. He was legally blind and could only see a few feet.

LeBlanc performed on albums by Jerry Jeff Walker, John Prine, Mac Davis, Carole King, Liza Minnelli, Melissa Manchester, the Osmond Brothers, Bill Medley, Red Simpson, Aretha Franklin, Gary Stewart, Jose Feliciano, Edwin Hubbard, Merle Haggard, T. G. Sheppard, Danny O'Keefe, Gary Paxton, Clarence Carter, The Wallflowers, Wayne Newton, Beck Hansen and many more. He played as a session musician in Memphis, Hollywood and in Muscle Shoals, Alabama.

LeBlanc spent three years performing live concerts with Jerry Jeff Walker and two years with John Prine. He has also performed with Natalie Merchant, George Jones, Jericho, Larry Raspberry, The Coon Elder Brenda Patterson Band, the Gentrys, Jerry Lee Lewis, Charlie Rich, Paul Craft, the Settlers, Ace Cannon and Lou Roberts.

Jakob Dylan dedicated the Wallflowers album Bringing Down the Horse to LeBlanc after his death from cancer.
