= For Better, or Worse =

Studio album by John Prine
- Released: September 30, 2016
- Recorded: January–February 2016
- Genre: Country
- Label: Oh Boy

John Prine chronology
Singing Mailman Delivers (2011)	For Better, or Worse (2016)	The Tree of Forgiveness (2018)

Professional ratings
Review scores
Source	Rating
AllMusic	3.5/5 stars
Associated Press	(favourable)
Exclaim!	9/10
The Guardian	4/5 stars
NPR	(favourable)
Robert Christgau	

For Better, or Worse is the seventeenth studio album by John Prine. It consists of tracks in which the artist teams with an all-star contingent of female singers on a selection of vintage country songs as duets. It was his first studio album in nine years, preceded by 2007's Standard Songs for Average People.

== Background ==
This is the second album featuring duets with Prine. His first album of duets was released in 1999 with the similarly styled In Spite of Ourselves.

The 15 tracks include 14 duets and feature 11 female artists, (with Iris DeMent, Lee Ann Womack and Kathy Mattea recording two duets each and Alison Krauss, Susan Tedeschi, Holly Williams, Morgane Stapleton, Amanda Shires, Miranda Lambert, Kacey Musgraves and Prine's wife, Fiona, also contributing). The last track is a solo recording by Prine, of Hank Williams' "Just Waitin'".

Iris DeMent and Fiona Prine were featured on the 1999 album as well.

== Commercial performance ==
Released on September 30, 2016 on CD and vinyl and in digital formats, the album debuted at No. 2 on the US Billboard Country Albums chart and at No. 30 on the Billboard 200. It also reached No. 7 on the US Independent Albums chart and No. 5 on the US Folk Albums chart. The album sold 43,700 copies in the US within its first six months of release.

== Track listing ==
No.	Title	Writer(s)	Featured vocalist	Length
1.	"Who's Gonna Take the Garbage Out"	Johnny Tillotson, Teddy Wilburn	Iris DeMent	2:41
2.	"Storms Never Last"	Jessi Colter	Lee Ann Womack	2:43
3.	"Falling in Love Again"	Friedrich Hollaender, Sammy Lerner	Alison Krauss	2:31
4.	"Color of the Blues"	George Jones, Lawton Williams	Susan Tedeschi	2:54
5.	"I'm Tellin' You"	Billy Hughes	Holly Williams	1:50
6.	"Remember Me (When Candlelights Are Gleaming)"	Scott Wiseman	Kathy Mattea	3:32
7.	"Look at Us"	Max T. Barnes, Vince Gill	Morgane Stapleton	2:46
8.	"Dim Lights, Thick Smoke (And Loud, Loud Music)"	Joe Maphis, Rose Lee Maphis	Amanda Shires	2:58
9.	"Fifteen Years Ago"	Raymond Smith	Lee Ann Womack	3:06
10.	"Cold, Cold Heart"	Hank Williams	Miranda Lambert	3:32
11.	"Dreaming My Dreams with You"	Allen Reynolds	Kathy Mattea	3:12
12.	"Mental Cruelty"	Buck Owens, Dixie Davis, Larry Davis	Kacey Musgraves	2:23
13.	"Mr. & Mrs. Used to Be"	Joe Deaton	Iris DeMent	2:36
14.	"My Happiness"	Betty Peterson, Borney Bergantine	Fiona Prine	2:55
15.	"Just Waitin'"	Hank Williams		2:49

== Personnel ==
- John Prine – lead vocals, acoustic guitar
- Kenneth Blevins – drums
- Shad Cobb – fiddle
- Iris DeMent – vocals on tracks 1 and 13
- Lloyd Green – pedal steel guitar
- Mark Howard – acoustic guitar, mandolin
- Dave Jacques – upright bass
- Kirk "Jelly Roll" Johnson – harmonica
- Alison Krauss – vocals on track 3
- Miranda Lambert – vocals on track 10
- Kathy Mattea – vocals on tracks 6 and 11
- Pat McLaughlin – mandolin
- Kacey Musgraves – vocals on track 12
- Tim O'Brien – fiddle, mandolin
- Al Perkins – pedal steel guitar, resonator guitar
- Fiona Prine – vocals on track 14
- Amanda Shires – vocals on track 8
- Morgane Stapleton – vocals on track 7
- Susan Tedeschi – electric guitar, vocals on track 4
- Pete Wasner – piano, Wurlitzer piano
- Jason Wilber – acoustic guitar, electric guitar
- Holly Williams – vocals on track 5
- Lee Ann Womack – vocals on tracks 2 and 9

== Charts ==
=== Weekly charts ===
Chart (2016)	Peak position
Belgian Albums (Ultratop Flanders)	161
Dutch Albums (Album Top 100)	152
US Billboard 200	30
US Top Country Albums (Billboard)	2
US Americana/Folk Albums (Billboard)	5
US Independent Albums (Billboard)	7
US Indie Store Album Sales (Billboard)	8

=== Year-end charts ===
Chart (2016)	Position
US Top Country Albums (Billboard)	69
