= Great Days: The John Prine Anthology =

Compilation album by John Prine
- Released: August 17, 1993
- Genre: Country
- Label: Rhino
- Producers: Barry Beckett, James Austin, David Briggs, Al Bunetta, Steve Cropper, Dan Einstein, Howie Epstein, Steve Goodman, Hank Neuberger, Jerry Phillips, Knox Phillips, John Prine, Jim Rooney, Arif Mardin

John Prine chronology
The Missing Years (1991)	Great Days: The John Prine Anthology (1993)	A John Prine Christmas (1994)

Great Days: The John Prine Anthology is a compilation album by American folk singer John Prine, released in 1993.

== Reception ==
Professional ratings
Review scores
Source	Rating
Allmusic	5/5 stars
Robert Christgau	(A)
Encyclopedia of Popular Music	4/5 stars

Allmusic critic Steven Thomas Erlewine called the album an excellent summary of Prine's prime period (1971–1991), and "this provides a nearly flawless recap of his career - so much so that it's not only for neophytes, but also reminds longtime fans why they loved him in the first place." Music critic Robert Christgau also praised the compilation, writing "There aren't 41 best Prine songs. There are 50, 60, maybe more; the only way to resolve quibbles would be a bigger box than commerce or decorum permits...Prine's a lot friendlier than your average thriving old singer-songwriter (Young, Thompson, Cohen), and his disinclination to downplay his natural warmth or his folk-rock retro may make him impenetrable to victims of irony proficiency amnesia."

== Track listing ==
All songs by John Prine unless otherwise noted.

Disc 1

1. "Illegal Smile" – 3:13
2. "Spanish Pipedream" – 2:41
3. "Hello In There" – 4:32
4. "Sam Stone" – 4:16
5. "Paradise" – 3:15
6. "Donald and Lydia" – 4:30
7. "The Late John Garfield Blues" – 3:06
8. "Yes I Guess They Oughta Name a Drink After You" – 2:10
9. "The Great Compromise" – 4:56
10. "Sweet Revenge" – 2:41
11. "Please Don't Bury Me" – 2:51
12. "Christmas in Prison" – 3:13
13. "Dear Abby" – 4:22 (live)
14. "Blue Umbrella" – 3:31
15. "Common Sense" – 3:11
16. "Come Back to Us Barbara Lewis Hare Krishna Beauregard" – 3:20
17. "Saddle in the Rain" – 3:35
18. "He Was in Heaven Before He Died" – 2:16
19. "Fish and Whistle" – 3:15
20. "That's the Way That the World Goes 'Round" – 3:22
21. "Bruised Orange (Chain of Sorrow)" – 5:20
- Tracks #1–6 are originally from John Prine
- Tracks #7–9 are originally from Diamonds in the Rough
- Tracks #10–14 are originally from Sweet Revenge
- Tracks #15–18 are originally from Common Sense
- Tracks #19–21 are originally from Bruised Orange

Disc 2

1. "Sabu Visits the Twin Cities Alone" – 2:55
2. "Automobile" – 4:23
3. "Killing the Blues" (Roly Salley) – 4:38
4. "Down by the Side of the Road" – 5:04
5. "Living in the Future" – 3:26
6. "It's Happening to You" (Prine, John Burns) – 2:19
7. "Storm Windows" – 5:07
8. "One Red Rose" – 3:19
9. "Souvenirs" – 3:33
10. "Aimless Love" – 3:08
11. "The Oldest Baby in the World" (Prine, Donnie Fritts) – 3:07
12. "People Puttin' People Down" – 2:50
13. "Unwed Fathers" (Prine, Bobby Braddock) – 3:32
14. "Angel from Montgomery" – 4:34 (live)
15. "Linda Goes to Mars" – 3:10
16. "Bad Boy" – 3:30
17. "Speed of the Sound of Loneliness" – 3:31 (live)
18. "It's a Big Old Goofy World" – 5:24 (live)
19. "The Sins of Memphisto" – 4:14
20. "All the Best" – 3:28
- Track #1 is originally from Bruised Orange
- Tracks #2–4 are originally from Pink Cadillac
- Tracks #5–8 are originally from Storm Windows
- Track #9 is originally from Affordable Art by Steve Goodman
- Tracks #10–13 are originally from Aimless Love
- Track #14 is originally from A Tribute to Steve Goodman
- Tracks #15–16 are originally from German Afternoons
- Track #17 is originally from John Prine Live
- Track #18 is originally from The Best of Mountain Stage Live, Volume 2
- Tracks #19–20 are originally from The Missing Years

== Personnel ==
- John Prine – vocals, guitar, backing vocals
- Kenny Ascher – piano
- Barry Beckett – piano
- David Briggs – organ, piano
- David Bromberg – guitar, dobro
- James Brown – organ
- Al Bunetta – percussion
- Steve Burgh – bass, drums, guitar
- John Burns – guitar, backing vocals
- Paul Cannon – guitar
- Tommy Cathey – bass
- Peter Bunetta – drums
- Gene Chrisman – drums
- Johnny Christopher – guitar
- Lewis Collins – horn
- Mailto Correa – conga
- Steve Cropper – guitar
- Philip Donnelly – guitar
- Pat Coulter – backing vocals
- Stuart Duncan – fiddle, mandolin
- Donald "Duck" Dunn – bass
- Bobby Emmons – organ
- Howie Epstein – guitar, percussion
- Chuck Fiore – bass
- Steve Fishell – pedal steel guitar
- Donnie Fritts – piano
- Bob Glaub – bass
- Steve Goodman – guitar, backing vocals, harmony vocals
- Jack Hale – horn
- Alan Hand – piano
- Glen D. Hardin – piano
- James Harrah – guitar
- Bishop Heywood – percussion
- Robert Hoban – fiddle, piano, backing vocals
- Wayne Jackson – horn
- John Jorgenson – guitar, mandolin
- Leo LeBlanc – pedal steel guitar
- Mike Leech – bass
- Howard Levy – organ, harmonica, accordion, saxophone
- Andrew Love – horn
- Lyle Lovett – vocals
- Raun MacKinnon – vocals, backing vocals, harmony vocals
- Jay Dee Maness – steel guitar
- Grady Martin – dobro
- Hugh McDonald – bass
- James Mitchell – horn
- Larry Muhoberac – piano
- Dee Murray – bass
- Phil Parlapiano – accordion
- Rachel Peer-Prine – bass, backing vocals, harmony vocals
- Tom Piekarske – bass, backing vocals
- Dave Prine – fiddle, guitar, vocals
- Bonnie Raitt – guitar, backing vocals, harmony vocals
- Joe Romersa – drums, percussion
- Jim Rooney – guitar, backing vocals
- Neal Rosengarden – bass
- Jim Rothermel – clarinet, recorder, saxophone, human whistle, penny whistle
- Johnny Lee Schell – bass, backing vocals, harmony vocals
- John Sebastian – harmonica
- Jerry Shook – harmonica
- Corky Siegel – piano
- Bobby Whitlock – organ, piano
- Bobby Woods – piano
- Rick Vito – guitar, slide guitar
- Reggie Young – guitar
- Sid Sims – bass
- Steve Spear – bass
- Benmont Tench – organ, bass
- Mike Utley – organ
- Tom Radtke – drums, percussion
- Tony Newman – drums
- Angie Varias – drums
- Kevin Wells – drums
- Kenny Malone – drums, tambourine
- Steve Mosley – drums
- Helen Bernard – backing vocals
- Bob Bowker – backing vocals
- Jackson Browne – backing vocals
- Liz Byrnes – backing vocals, harmony vocals
- Judy Clay – backing vocals
- Len Dressler – backing vocals
- Phyllis Duncan – backing vocals
- Gwen Edwards – backing vocals
- Glenn Frey – backing vocals
- Kitty Haywood – backing vocals
- Bonnie Herman – backing vocals
- Diane Holmes – backing vocals
- Cissy Houston – backing vocals
- Vicki Hubley – backing vocals
- Brooks Hunnicutt – backing vocals
- Bonnie Koloc – backing vocals, harmony vocals
- Greg Prestopino – backing vocals
- JD Souther – backing vocals
- Don Shelton – backing vocals
- Deidre Tuck – backing vocals
- Jennifer Warnes – backing vocals
- Beverly White – backing vocals
- Matthew Wilder – backing vocals

== Production notes ==
- Ken Perry – remastering
- Gary Peterson – research
- Bill Inglot – remastering
- Carl Marsh – arranger
- David Fricke – liner notes
- Geoff Gans – artwork
