= The Tree of Forgiveness =

Studio album by John Prine
- Released: April 13, 2018
- Recorded: July 13, 2017–18
- Studio: RCA Studio A (Nashville, Tennessee)
- Genre: Country folk, Americana
- Length: 32:51
- Label: Oh Boy
- Producer: Dave Cobb

John Prine chronology
For Better, or Worse (2016)	The Tree of Forgiveness (2018)

The Tree of Forgiveness is the eighteenth and final studio album by American country folk singer John Prine. The album was released on April 13, 2018. It is the last album released by Prine before his death on April 7, 2020.

== Background ==
The album is Prine's first album since 2005's Fair & Square to consist of his own new songs. Most of the songs were co-written with other songwriters, including Pat McLaughlin, Dan Auerbach, Keith Sykes, and Phil Spector. The album features guest vocals from artists such as Jason Isbell, Amanda Shires, and Brandi Carlile. Isbell and Shires also played instruments on some of the tracks. The album was recorded at RCA Studio A in Nashville.

- John Prine: Lead vocals and acoustic guitar
- Dave Cobb: Acoustic guitar, 12-string guitar, and mellotron
- Pat McLaughlin: Background vocals and mandolin
- Jason Wilber: Electric guitar
- Dave Jacques: Bass
- Ken Blevins: Drums, kick drum, and rack tom
- Mike Webb: B3, piano, and mellotron

== Critical reception ==
Professional ratings
Aggregate scores
Source	Rating
AnyDecentMusic?	7.3/10
Metacritic	77/100
Review scores
Source	Rating
AllMusic	4/5 stars
Chicago Tribune	3/4 stars
The Independent	4/5 stars
The Irish Times	4/5 stars
Mojo	3/5 stars
Pitchfork	7.6/10
Rolling Stone	4/5 stars
The Times	4/5 stars
Uncut	8/10
Vice	A−

The Tree of Forgiveness has received positive reviews from professional music critics, with a Metacritic rating of 77 based on 13 critics, indicating "generally favorable reviews". Rolling Stone listed the album as the 22nd best album of 2018 and the 91st best album of the 2010s.

== Commercial performance ==
The album debuted at No. 5 on the Billboard 200, which is Prine's best-ever ranking on the chart. It also debuted at No. 2 on the Top Country Albums chart and Rock Albums, and No. 1 on Americana/Folk Albums, selling 53,000 copies (54,000 album-equivalent units) in the first week. It has sold 156,000 copies in the United States as of September 2019.

== Track listing ==
No.	Title	Writer(s)	Length
1.	"Knockin' on Your Screen Door"	Pat McLaughlin, Prine	2:19
2.	"I Have Met My Love Today"	Roger Cook, Prine	1:50
3.	"Egg & Daughter Nite, Lincoln Nebraska, 1967 (Crazy Bone)"	McLaughlin, Prine	4:05
4.	"Summer's End"	McLaughlin, Prine	3:29
5.	"Caravan of Fools"	Dan Auerbach, McLaughlin, Prine	2:28
6.	"The Lonesome Friends of Science"	Prine	4:41
7.	"No Ordinary Blue"	Prine, Keith Sykes	2:56
8.	"Boundless Love"	Auerbach, McLaughlin, Prine	3:35
9.	"God Only Knows"	Prine, Phil Spector	3:46
10.	"When I Get to Heaven"	Prine	3:42

== Charts ==
=== Weekly charts ===
Chart (2018–2020)	Peak position
Swiss Albums (Schweizer Hitparade)	53
UK Country Albums (OCC)	2
US Billboard 200	5
US Americana/Folk Albums (Billboard)	1
US Independent Albums (Billboard)	2
US Top Country Albums (Billboard)	2
US Top Rock Albums (Billboard)	2

=== Year-end charts ===
Chart (2018)	Position
US Top Country Albums (Billboard)	58
US Top Rock Albums (Billboard)	73
