= Souvenirs (John Prine album) =

Studio album by John Prine
- Released: 31 October 2000
- Recorded: 24–26 April 2000
- Studio: Cowboy Arms (Nashville, Tennessee)
- Genre: Folk, alt-country, Americana
- Label: Oh Boy, Ulftone Music
- Producer: Jim Rooney, John Prine

John Prine chronology
In Spite of Ourselves (1999)	Souvenirs (2000)	Fair & Square (2005)

Professional ratings
Review scores
Source	Rating
AllMusic	2.5/5 stars
Associated Press	3/4 stars
The Encyclopedia of Popular Music	3/5 stars
(The New) Rolling Stone Album Guide	2/5 stars

Souvenirs is a studio album by John Prine, released in 2000. Originally intended for German-only release, the album consists of new performances of some of Prine's most popular early songs.

== Critical reception ==
AllMusic critic Zac Johnson wrote that "John Prine's contemporary touches on these old favorites may provide new insights, but the new versions rarely surpass the originals." Country Standard Time called the album "an endearing, entertaining stopgap for fans waiting to hear new gems from this talented songwriter." The Arkansas Democrat-Gazette called it "a gem," writing that the songs exist "in their spare, acoustic glory with only the rough edges of Prine’s voice to guide you." The Irish Times called it "a stunning reminder" of "Prine's consistently intelligent take on how to tell a story."

== Track listing ==
All tracks composed by John Prine.

1. "Souvenirs" – 3:42
2. "Fish and Whistle" – 3:00
3. "Far from Me" – 5:09
4. "Angel from Montgomery" – 5:07
5. "Donald and Lydia" – 4:09
6. "Christmas in Prison" – 3:37
7. "Storm Windows" – 4:26
8. "Grandpa Was a Carpenter" – 2:52
9. "The Late John Garfield Blues" – 3:46
10. "Blue Umbrella" – 3:53
11. "Six O'Clock News" – 4:36
12. "People Puttin' People Down" – 4:00
13. "Sam Stone" – 4:39
14. "Please Don't Bury Me" – 3:06
15. "Hello in There" – 4:57

== Personnel ==
- John Prine – vocals, guitar
- Stuart Basore – pedal steel guitar
- Shawn Camp – fiddle
- Paul Griffith – drums, percussion
- Dave Jacques -- upright bass, electric bass
- Pat McLaughlin – harmony vocals
- Phil Parlapiano – organ, mandolin, piano, accordion
- Jason Wilber – mandolin, guitar
