= The Great Compromise (song) =

Song by John Prine

from the album Diamonds in the Rough
- Released: 1972
- Studio: Atlantic Recording Studios, New York City
- Genre: Folk, Anti-war, Protest song
- Length: 4:57
- Label: Atlantic Records
- Songwriter: John Prine
- Producer: Arif Mardin

"The Great Compromise" is a song written and performed by John Prine. The song was included on Prine's album Diamonds in the Rough which was released by Atlantic Records in 1972. It is an anti-war song and a protest song. Its theme is the disillusionment of the country during the Vietnam War era. In the liner notes to his 1993 anthology Great Days, Prine writes of this song, "The idea I had in mind was that America was this girl you used to take to drive-in movies. And then when you went to get some popcorn, she turned around and screwed some guy in foreign sports car. I really love America. I just don't know how to get there anymore."

In 2011, Oh Boy Records released 1970 recordings of Prine singing "The Great Compromise" on Singing Mailman Delivers. Before singing the song he says, "This is a song that Francis Scott Key and me wrote not too long ago. He writes political songs (you know), I write love songs. So we got together and wrote a song ... It's a hate song to a woman I love. It's about a kid who went out to find America, and he found her in a bar room, drinking-she was feeling bad. So he felt sorry for her and asked her out to the drive-in."

An obituary for Prine described the song as "Dylan-esque".
