= Live on Tour =

Live album by John Prine
- Released: 1997
- Genres: Folk, alt-country, Americana
- Length: 70:51
- Label: Oh Boy
- Producers: Dan Einstein, John Prine

John Prine chronology
Lost Dogs + Mixed Blessings (1995)	Live on Tour (1997)	In Spite of Ourselves (1999)

Live on Tour is a live album by American singer-songwriter John Prine, released in 1997. The album also include three studio tracks.

== Reception ==
Professional ratings
Review scores
Source	Rating
Allmusic	3/5 stars
Robert Christgau	
NME	8/10
Uncut	3/5 stars

Writing for Allmusic, critic Jeff Burger wrote of the album "The studio tracks tacked onto the end of this album are nothing to write home about, but overall, Live on Tour is a solid collection. Featuring everything from tender folk ballads to rockers packed with Prine's trademark wacky witticisms, it would be a perfect starting point for anyone who has had the misfortune to have not yet encountered this one-of-a-kind artist."

== Track listing ==
All tracks composed by John Prine; except where indicated

1. "Picture Show" – 3:54
2. "Quit Hollerin' at Me" (Prine, Gary Nicholson) – 6:10
3. "You Got Gold" (Prine, Keith Sykes) – 4:55
4. "Unwed Fathers" (Braddock, Prine) – 3:00
5. "Space Monkey" (Prine, Peter Case) – 5:12
6. "The Late John Garfield Blues" – 4:11
7. "Storm Windows" – 4:32
8. "Jesus the Missing Years" – 6:38
9. "Humidity Built the Snowman" – 4:51
10. "Illegal Smile" – 4:33
11. "Daddy's Little Pumpkin" (Prine, Pat McLaughlin) – 3:38
12. "Lake Marie" – 8:47
13. "If I Could" (Tim Carroll) – 3:10
14. "Stick a Needle in My Eye" (Pat McLaughlin, Prine) – 3:06
15. "You Mean So Much to Me" (Prine, Donnie Fritts) – 4:14

== Personnel ==
- John Prine – vocals, guitar
- Larry Crane – guitar, backing vocals
- Howie Epstein – bass
- Jack Holder – guitar
- David Jacques – bass
- John Jorgenson – guitar, banjo, mandolin
- Pat McLaughlin – guitar
- Phil Parlapiano – organ, piano, accordion, backing vocals
- Joe Romersa – drums, percussion
- Sam Shoup – bass
- David Steele – guitar, backing vocals
- Benmont Tench – piano, keyboards
- Robby Turner – pedal steel guitar
- Jason Wilber – guitar, backing vocals
- Gary Belz – backing vocals
- Al Bunetta – backing vocals
- Keith Sykes – backing vocals
