= John Prine Live =

Live album by John Prine
- Released: 1988
- Genre: Folk, alt-country, Americana
- Label: Oh Boy
- Producer: Dan Einstein, Jim Rooney, John Prine

John Prine chronology
German Afternoons (1986)	John Prine Live (1988)	The Missing Years (1991)

John Prine Live is a live album by American folk singer and songwriter John Prine, released in 1988. It was originally released as a double-LP.

== Recording ==
John Prine Live was taped mostly during a three-day stint at The Coach House in San Juan Capistrano, California. It was released on Oh Boy Records, Prine's own independent label. As he explained to David Fricke in 1993, Oh Boy needed product: "We didn't have another artist to put out. The idea was to have me and my guitar, telling stories and doing songs – and buying me some time until I could get into the studio again."

The version of "Angel from Montgomery" was recorded at an all-star memorial concert for Steve Goodman (who died of leukemia in 1984) held in Chicago in January 1985 and released later that year as Tribute to Steve Goodman. Prine is joined by Bonnie Raitt (who recorded "Angel from Montgomery" on her 1974 Streetlights album) and guitarist David Bromberg. The version of "Souvenirs" is taken from a 1970s performance by Prine and Goodman from the TV show Austin City Limits.

Prine dedicated the album to his mother, Verna Prine.

== Reception ==
Professional ratings
Review scores
Source	Rating
Allmusic	4/5 stars
Encyclopedia of Popular Music	4/5 stars

Writing for Allmusic, critic William Ruhlman says of the album "With years of experience playing club dates, John Prine has evolved into a very entertaining live performer, and this album...presents him at his intimate best, telling funny stories and performing his most impressive material in unadorned arrangements."

== Track listing ==
All songs by John Prine unless otherwise noted.

1. "Come Back to Us Barbara Lewis Hare Krishna Beauregard" – 3:04
2. "Six O'Clock News" – 3:16
3. "The Oldest Baby in the World" (Prine, Donnie Fritts) – 6:50
4. "Angel from Montgomery" – 4:16
5. "Grandpa Was a Carpenter" – 2:49
6. "Blue Umbrella" – 3:15
7. "Fish and Whistle" – 3:01
8. "Sabu Visits the Twin Cities Alone" – 5:47
9. "Living in the Future " – 3:45
10. "Illegal Smile" – 4:16
11. "Mexican Home" – 4:16
12. "Speed of the Sound of Loneliness" – 3:27
13. "The Accident (Things Could Be Worse)" – 2:50
14. "Sam Stone" – 5:06
15. "Souvenirs" – 3:33
16. "Aw Heck" – 2:33
17. "Donald and Lydia" – 3:50
18. "That's the Way That the World Goes 'Round" – 3:47
19. "Hello In There" – 4:48

== Personnel ==
- John Prine – vocals, guitar
- Bonnie Raitt – acoustic guitar, vocals on "Angel from Montgomery"
- Johnny Lee Schell – bass, harmony vocals on "Angel from Montgomery"
- David Bromberg – electric guitar on "Angel from Montgomery"
- Steve Goodman – acoustic guitar, vocals on "Souvenirs"
- Jim Rooney – acoustic guitar, harmony vocals on "Fish and Whistle" and "Speed of the Sound of Loneliness"
- Philip Donnelly – electric guitar, harmony vocals on "Fish and Whistle" and "Speed of the Sound of Loneliness"
- Rachel Peer Prine – bass, harmony vocals on "Fish and Whistle" and "Speed of the Sound of Loneliness"
- Stuart Duncan – mandolin on "Fish and Whistle" and "Speed of the Sound of Loneliness"
- Kenny Malone – drums, percussion on "Fish and Whistle" and "Speed of the Sound of Loneliness"
- Al Bunetta – executive producer
