= Tré Burt =

American singer-songwriter

- Origin: Sacramento, CA
- Occupation: Singer-songwriter
- Instruments: Vocals, guitar
- Years active: 2018–present
- Label: Oh Boy Records
- Website: Official website

Tré Burt is an American singer-songwriter from Sacramento, California.

== Career ==
Tré Burt's debut album, Caught It From The Rye, was originally released independently in 2019 before being re-released on John Prine's Oh Boy Records in early 2020. Later, in September of that year, Burt released the single Under the Devil's Knee (feat. Sunny War, Leyla McCalla, and Allison Russell) in response to the deaths of George Floyd, Breonna Taylor, and Eric Garner and police violence in America.

The following year, Burt released his second full-length You, Yeah, You. The album was recorded in Durham, North Carolina with producer Brad Cook and featured contributions from Amelia Meath, Phil Cook (musician), and Kelsey Waldon.

His third album Traffic Fiction was released in 2023. The album is a tribute to his late grandfather Tommy Burt, inspired by music he heard growing up while driving around in his grandfather's car. Burt wrote and recorded demos for the album alone in the wilderness of Alberta, Canada and finished the album later in Nashville. He followed the album with a tour opening for Wilco across Europe and the U.S. and his own solo tours of Europe and the U.S. in 2024.

== Discography ==
=== Albums ===
Year	Title	Label
2020	Caught it from the Rye	Oh Boy Records
2021	You, Yeah, You	Oh Boy Records
2023	Traffic Fiction	Oh Boy Records

=== Singles ===
Year	Title	Label
2020	Under the Devil's Knee	Oh Boy Records
