= Lost Dogs + Mixed Blessings =

Studio album by John Prine
- Released: April 4, 1995
- Studios: Huh Sound Theater, Los Angeles and Pacifique Recording Studios, North Hollywood
- Genres: Folk, alt-country, Americana
- Label: Oh Boy
- Producer: Howie Epstein

John Prine chronology
| A John Prine Christmas (1994) | Lost Dogs + Mixed Blessings (1995) | Live on Tour (1997) |

Lost Dogs + Mixed Blessings is the 12th studio album by American folk singer John Prine, released in 1995. The cover artwork is by John Callahan.

== Recording ==
Lost Dogs + Mixed Blessings was produced by Tom Petty and the Heartbreakers bassist Howie Epstein, who produced Prine's 1991 Grammy Winning comeback album The Missing Years. The album features several songs Prine co-wrote with Nashville veteran Gary Nicholson and includes contributions from guitarist Waddy Wachtel and Marianne Faithfull. It was recorded, as The Missing Years had been, at Huh Sound Theater, Los Angeles and Pacifique Recording Studios, North Hollywood – which was really Epstein's house – and featured many of the same musicians that played on the previous album. However, Prine told the Fort Lauderdale Sun-Sentinel in 1995, "I didn’t want to try to come up with The Missing Years II. Sure, it came out big and shiny, but it won’t help if you put horns on it if the songs aren’t good." Prine also admitted that he and Epstein had come to the end of their working relationship: "We kinda overextended ourselves on Lost Dogs...I think we were pretty tired of each other. At the end, we shook hands and said, 'OK, we did it.'"

== Composition ==
"Lake Marie" is arguably the album's most popular track. The song was inspired in part by Prine's crumbling marriage and a series of grisly murders the singer remembered the Chicago news media having a field day with when he was a kid. The John Prine Shrine website quotes the singer discussing his inspiration for the song: "It's an actual place along the Illinois-Wisconsin border. There's an entire chain of lakes along there, small lakes, and I remember as a teenager growing up in Chicago, a lot of the teenagers would go to these lakes and in the summer time kind of get away from the city. Lake Marie was kind of just one that stuck out in my mind. About '59, '60, '61, I grew up in Maywood - it's a western suburb of Chicago, and we started hearing about murders that weren't related to the mob. You know, John Wayne Gacy was like, about two towns away from me and you just hear about it. The suburbs were kind of thought to be a pretty safe place at the time, and then some of these unexplained murders would show up every once in a while, where they'd find people in the woods somewhere. I just kind of took any one of them, not one in particular, and put it as if it was in a TV newscast. It was a sharp left turn to take in a song, but when I got done with it, I kind of felt like it's what the song needed right then." In 2005 Lloyd Sachs wrote that the song was "one of Prine’s masterpieces." In a 2009 interview with The Huffington Post, Bob Dylan commented, "If I had to pick one song of his, it might be 'Lake Marie'."

"Ain't Hurtin' Nobody" was inspired by one of the singer's childhood trips to the beach and would be chosen to be Prine's second music video (the first having been "Picture Show"). The optimistic "New Train" seems to celebrate a new lease on life while "Humidity Built the Snowman" is a commentary on the impermanence of relationships. Several of the songs have a harder edge than many might expect from Prine, largely due to the presence of guitarist Waddy Wachtel, such as "Big Fat Love", which producer Howie Epstein referred to as “the Aerosmith number”, and the ominous "Quit Hollerin' at Me", which reveals Prine's frustration with consumer culture and the need to escape. Regarding the album's slick and occasionally "commercial-rock" sound, biographer Eddie Huffman speculates, "After the success of The Missing Years, Prine and Epstein may have thought they could do no wrong, and the cheesier songs sound like calculated attempts to get Prine on the radio."

== Reception ==
Professional ratings
Review scores
| Source | Rating |
|---|---|
| Allmusic | 3/5 stars |
| Chicago Tribune | 3.5/4 stars |
| Christgau's Consumer Guide | A |
| The Encyclopedia of Popular Music | 3/5 stars |
| Entertainment Weekly | B |
| Los Angeles Times | 3/4 stars |
| The New Rolling Stone Album Guide | 3/5 stars |
| Spin | 6/10 |

Lost Dogs and Mixed Blessings received favorable reviews upon release and was nominated for a Grammy award. Rolling Stone magazine commented, "Unlike virtually every other act in his age group, veteran singer/songwriter John Prine is doing the best work of his career right now." Writing for Allmusic, critic William Ruhlman wrote of the album "Fans of the early Prine may find that sound over-produced, but the songs never get lost, and with Prine's typically humorous, off-center view of the world..." Music critic Robert Christgau wrote "Prine's waggish pathos and lip-smacking Americanese have been whetted by the divorce that keeps nosing in where it's not wanted." Biographer Eddie Huffman takes a dim view of the lyrics to several songs, such as “We Are the Lonely” and “Leave the Lights On,” the latter of which was credited to Prine, Howie Epstein, Phil Parlapiano, and drummer Joe Romersa: “Prine seemed to be aiming at Cowboy Jack Clement-style whimsy, but it’s a wonder no one convinced him it was a terrible mistake to rhyme ‘telephoney’ with ‘Rice-A-Roni’ and ‘forty-two-inch Sony’ with ‘Twilight Zoney’.”

== Found Dogs ==
In 2026, Found Dogs, an archival release celebrating the 30th anniversary of the album, was released. It includes alternate takes, demos, and five previously unreleased songs from the recording seesions.

== Track listing ==
1. "New Train" (John Prine) – 3:24
2. "Ain't Hurtin' Nobody" (Prine) – 5:01
3. "All the Way With You" (Prine, Gary Nicholson) – 3:52
4. "We Are the Lonely" (Prine, Nicholson) – 4:28
5. "Lake Marie" (Prine) – 6:00
6. "Humidity Built the Snowman" (Prine) – 4:27
7. "Day Is Done" (Prine, Nicholson) – 3:33
8. "Quit Hollerin' at Me" (Prine, Nicholson) – 4:16
9. "Big Fat Love" (Prine, Nicholson) – 3:58
10. "Same Thing Happened to Me" (Prine, Nicholson) – 3:18
11. "This Love Is Real" (Prine, Lee Clayton) – 3:18
12. "Leave the Lights On" (Prine, Howie Epstein, Phil Parlapiano, Joe Romersa) – 3:28
13. "He Forgot That It Was Sunday" (Prine) – 5:38
14. "I Love You So Much It Hurts" (Floyd Tillman) – 2:32

== Personnel ==
- John Prine – vocals, guitar
- Marianne Faithfull – backing vocals
- Johnnie Fiori – backing vocals
- Sass Jordan – backing vocals
- John Jorgenson – guitar, slide guitar, dobro, mandolin, banjo, vocals
- Doug Hamblin – background vocals
- Benmont Tench – piano, organ
- Patti Brooks – background vocals
- Howie Epstein – guitar, slide guitar, bass, banjo, piano, harmonica, percussion, marxophone, vocals
- Bob Glaub – bass
- John Hobbs – piano
- Vicky Levy – vocals
- Jay Dee Maness – pedal steel
- Gary Nicholson – guitar, piano
- Phil Parlapiano – mandolin, accordion, harmonium, keyboards
- Juliette Prayter – percussion
- Joe Romersa – drums, percussion
- Vince Santoro – percussion
- Sarah Taylor – background vocals
- Waddy Wachtel – electric and acoustic guitar
- Gary Riley – hurdy-gurdy, percussion
- Rock Deadrick – drums, percussion
- Carlene Carter – autoharp, percussion
- Carol Leffler – backing vocals

== Charts ==
| Year | Chart | Position |
|---|---|---|
| 1995 | Billboard Top 200 Albums | 159 |

2025 chart performance for Lost Dogs and Mixed Blessings
| Chart (2025) | Peak position |
|---|---|
| Scottish Albums (Official Charts) | 65 |
| UK Country Albums (Official Charts) | 3 |
| UK Independent Albums (Official Charts) | 35 |

== Bibliography ==
- Huffman, Eddie (2015). John Prine: In Spite of Himself. University of Texas Press. ISBN 9780292748224.
