= Live at Old Town School of Folk =

Live album by John Prine
- Released: June 12, 2026
- Recorded: March 6, 2010
- Venue: Old Town School of Folk Music
- Genre: Folk
- Length: 70:51
- Label: Oh Boy

Live at Old Town School of Folk is a live album by American singer-songwriter John Prine, released in 2026 in Nashville on the Oh Boy label.

Prine was raised in nearby Maywood, Illinois and first visited the Old Town School of Folk Music in Chicago as a teenager, sent by his older brother who was hoping to get Prine to expand his interests in life beyond playing pool. Prine developed his career by playing at the venue and performed a solo concert there in 2010 that was recorded for the release of this album.

Live at Old Town School of Folk was recorded directly from the concert mixing board on March 6, 2010. It includes the entire concert with stage banter from Prine and demonstrates his well-known raport with his audiences.

== Track listing ==
All tracks composed by John Prine except (15)

1. "Spanish Pipedream" - 4:02
2. "The Oldest Baby In The World" - 3:07
3. "Crooked Piece of Time" - 2:46
4. "Six O'Clock News" - 5:32
5. "Souvenirs" - 6:01
6. "Far From Me" - 12:07
7. "Grandpa Was A Carpenter" - 3:35
8. "Fish and Whistle" - 11:41
9. "The Late John Garfield Blues" - 4:51
10. "Glory Of True Love" - 5:42
11. "Crazy As A Loon" - 6:25
12. "Angel From Montgomery" - 6:00
13. "Jesus The Missing Years" - 6:49
14. "Sins of Memphisto" - 4:33
15. "My Old Man" (Steve Goodman) - 6:40
16. "Illegal Smile" - 7:01
17. "Way Back Then" - 3:34
18. "Please Don't Bury Me" - 4:27
19. "Bruised Orange (Chain of Sorrow)" - 6:50
20. "That's The Way The World Goes Round" - 9:55
21. "Sam Stone" - 7:52
22. "That's Alright By Me" - 5:55
23. "She Is My Everything" - 4:51
24. "Ain't Hurtin' Nobody" - 6:31
25. "Hello In There" - 7:06
26. "Lake Marie" - 10:30
27. "Christmas In Prison" - 5:13
28. "Paradise" - 8:59

== Personnel ==
- John Prine – vocals, guitar
