= Jason Wilber =

- Origin: Bloomington, Indiana
- Genres: American folk music, Americana
- Occupations: Singer-songwriter, musician
- Instruments: Guitar, vocals
- Labels: Oh Boy Records, Flat Earth Records, WilberTone Records
- Website: www.jasonwilber.net

Jason Wilber is an American folk/acoustic singer, guitarist, songwriter, and recording artist. He grew up in Bloomington, Indiana.

== Musical career ==
Jason Wilber has released eleven CDs of mostly solo work to date. His ninth album, Echoes, consisted of covers of other artists' songs. His latest is Time Traveler, released in 2020.

His TV appearances and radio broadcasts include The Colbert Report, Late Night with Conan O’Brien, Sessions At West 54th Street, The Grand Ole Opry, Live with Regis and Kathy Lee, CNN's Entertainment Week, The Road, Mountain Stage, E-Town, Austin City Limits, and The Late Show with David Letterman.

=== Collaborations ===
Wilber played guitar on John Prine's Grammy Award-winning album Fair & Square and on Prine's two Grammy Award-nominated albums Live on Tour and In Spite of Ourselves (which spent 32 weeks on the Billboard Country Charts).

Jason has accompanied John Prine on duet recordings with Emmylou Harris, Lucinda Williams, Josh Ritter, Patty Loveless, Iris Dement, Trisha Yearwood, and Sara Watkins.

He has played with other artists, including John Prine, Hal Ketchum, Greg Brown, Iris DeMent, Todd Snider, Greg Trooper, Carrie Newcomer, Tom Russell and Tim Grimm, Krista Detor, Kim Fox, Bill Wilson, and Over the Rhine.

Jason Wilber served as Co-Executive Producer on the compilation CD Coal Country Music featuring Willie Nelson, Gillian Welch, Ralph Stanley, Jason and the Scorchers, Kathy Mattea, Justin Townes Earle, Natalie Merchant, Diana Jones, Tom T. Hall, Bonnie Raitt, John Prine, Jean Ritchie, and other artists, who all contributed their talents to benefit the Alliance for Appalachia's work to stop Mountain Top Removal in rural Appalachia.

== Discography ==
- 1998: Lost in Your Hometown
- 2000: Amber Waves
- 2000: Behind the Midway
- 2004: King For A Day
- 2006: Lazy Afternoon
- 2006: Live and Otherwise Volume 1
- 2008: Ghost of Summers Past
- 2009: Live and Otherwise Volume 2
- 2016: Echoes
- 2017: Reaction Time
- 2020: Time Traveler
