= A John Prine Christmas =

Studio album by John Prine
- Released: 1993
- Genre: Christmas, country, folk
- Length: 32:28
- Label: Oh Boy
- Producer: Howie Epstein, David Ferguson, Jack Grochmal, Jim Rooney

John Prine chronology
Great Days: The John Prine Anthology (1993)	A John Prine Christmas (1993)	Lost Dogs + Mixed Blessings (1995)

A John Prine Christmas is the 11th studio album by American folk singer John Prine, released in 1993.

"If You Were the Woman and I Was the Man" is a duet with Margo Timmins, lead singer of the Cowboy Junkies.

== Reception ==
Professional ratings
Review scores
Source	Rating
Allmusic	3.5/5 stars
Robert Christgau	(1-star Honorable Mention)

Writing for Allmusic, critic Ronnie D. Lankford Jr. wrote of the album "this isn't the run-of-the-mill holiday product, and Prine can still write a good song when he sets his mind to it. Old fans will be glad to see that even cynics can age gracefully." Music critic Robert Christgau gave the album a 1-star Honorable Mention rating.

== Track listing ==
1. "Everything Is Cool" (John Prine) – 3:24
2. "All the Best" (Prine) – 4:34 (live)
3. "Silent Night All Day Long" (John Prine) – 3:52
4. "If You Were the Woman and I Was the Man" (Michael Timmins) – 4:36 (live)
5. "Silver Bells" (Ray Evans, Jay Livingston) – 3:57
6. "I Saw Mommy Kissing Santa Claus" (Tommie Connor) – 3:06
7. "Christmas in Prison" (Prine) – 3:59 (live)
8. "A John Prine Christmas" (Prine) – 5:10
