= Standard Songs for Average People =

Studio album by John Prine and Mac Wiseman
- Released: April 24, 2007
- Genres: Folk, bluegrass, alt-country, Americana
- Length: 44:57
- Label: Oh Boy
- Producers: John Prine, David Ferguson

John Prine chronology
Fair & Square (2005)	Standard Songs for Average People (2007)	For Better, or Worse (2016)

Standard Songs for Average People is an album by John Prine and Mac Wiseman, consisting entirely of cover versions of other songs.

== Reception ==
Professional ratings
Review scores
Source	Rating
Allmusic	3.5/5 stars
Freight Train Boogie	3.5/4 stars
The Green Man Review	(positive)
No Depression	(no rating)

Writing for Allmusic, critic Mark Deming wrote of the album "The craft is strong on Standard Songs for Average People, but at its heart it sounds like two friends singing some old songs they love on a quiet evening, and that's part of the album's strength -- these are 14 songs sung by two guys who know a great tune when they hear it, and they allow these numbers to work their magic simply, which serves them very well." Music critic Don Grant wrote "This release by veterans Prine and Wiseman doesn't break any new ground... As would be expected from two performers of this caliber, the tunes are well executed and come off with nary a hitch. If you're a new listener to this game, by all means pick it up and expand your horizons. However, for most, it's probably a shade on the redundant side." Mike Wilson of The Green Man Review gave the album a positive rating, calling it "an honest and heartfelt recording."

Critic John Milward of the No Depression wrote that the songs were "hardly standard" and the album "an amiable picking party that evokes placid Sunday picnics more than rowdy Saturday nights. And while the results are pleasant enough, one can’t help but wish somebody had spiked the punchbowl."

== Track listing ==
1. "Blue Eyed Elaine" (Ernest Tubb) – 2:34
2. "Don't Be Ashamed of Your Age" (Cindy Walker, Bob Wills) – 2:26
3. "I Forgot to Remember to Forget" (Charlie Feathers, Stan Kesler) – 3:01
4. "I Love You Because" (Leon Payne) – 4:22
5. "Pistol Packin' Mama" (Al Dexter) – 2:43
6. "Saginaw, Michigan" (Bill Anderson, Donald Wayne) – 2:55
7. "Old Dogs, Children and Watermelon Wine" (Tom T. Hall) – 4:36
8. "Old Cape Cod" (Claire Rothrock, Milton Yakus, Allan Jeffrey) – 2:25
9. "Death of Floyd Collins" (Andrew Jenkins, Irene Spain) – 3:25
10. "Blue Side of Lonesome" (Leon Payne) – 4:09
11. "In the Garden" (C. Austin Miles) – 3:08
12. "Just the Other Side of Nowhere" (Kris Kristofferson) – 2:36
13. "Old Rugged Cross" (George Bennard)– 3:31
14. "Where the Blue of the Night" (Bing Crosby, Fred E. Ahlert, Roy Turk) – 3:01

== Personnel ==
- John Prine – vocals, guitar
- Mac Wiseman – vocals, guitar
- Lester Armistead – harmony vocals
- Kenneth Blevins – drums, percussion
- Mike Bub – bass
- Jack Clement – dobro, guitar
- Stuart Duncan – fiddle
- Lloyd Green – pedal steel guitar
- Jamie Hartford – guitar
- David Jacques – bass
- Carol Lee Singers – background vocals
- Ronnie McCoury – mandolin
- Pat McInerney – drums
- Pat McLaughlin – guitar, harmonica, mandolin, ukulele, harmony vocals, baritone guitar
- Joey Miskulin – accordion
- Tim O'Brien – banjo, guitar

== Chart positions ==
Year	Chart	Position
2007	Billboard Top Independent albums	37
2007	Billboard Top Internet albums	255
