= The Missing Years (album) =

Studio album by John Prine
- Released: September 24, 1991
- Recorded: Huh Sound Theater, Los Angeles and The Money Pit, Nashville, TN
- Genres: Folk, alt-country, Americana
- Length: 54:32
- Label: Oh Boy
- Producer: Howie Epstein

John Prine chronology
John Prine Live (1988)	The Missing Years (1991)	Great Days: The John Prine Anthology (1993)

The Missing Years is the 10th studio album by American musician John Prine, released in 1991 on Oh Boy Records. It won the Grammy Award for Best Contemporary Folk Album. In July 2013 the label released a deluxe vinyl reissue of the album with a bonus track called "The Third of July" from Prine's appearance on the PBS concert series Sessions at West 54th in 2001.

== Recording ==
The Missing Years was Prine's first studio release since his 1986 album German Afternoons and is regarded as his comeback album. According to the Great Days: The John Prine Anthology liner notes, manager Al Bunetta and longtime Prine associate Dan Einstein were brainstorming over prospective producers at Oh Boy headquarters and the name of Howie Epstein came up. Epstein, the bass player in Tom Petty's Heartbreakers, was a longtime fan, with Prine recalling "I'd heard for years that he and (Heartbreakers keyboard player) Benmont Tench would show up at my shows. And I heard all the guys in the Heartbreakers played my stuff on the road. So Al called Howie. And before he could even hang up the phone, Howie was in the office. Four hours later, he was still there, talking to my manager about my music." Roger Waters and Michael Kamen were also very interested in producing Prine's new album. Although it was partially recorded at The Money Pit in Nashville, it was mostly recorded at Huh Sound Theater in Los Angeles (actually Epstein's guest bedroom on Readcrest Drive), which led to a coterie of famous contributors, including Tom Petty, Phil Everly, Bonnie Raitt, Albert Lee, and Bruce Springsteen. Prine had bumped into Springsteen at an Italian restaurant the day he arrived to record, with Springsteen telling Prine, "When you guys get into the record and have something to play, please invite me over. I'd just love to play guitar or harmonica or sing or whatever." Prine told the Phoenix New Times in a 1991 interview, "Howie has one of those houses that looks like it's going to fall off the cliff. But it was great. All we paid for was the musicians, the tape and the engineer. I recorded most of it in a hallway. I mean a hallway - we're talkin' three-and-a-half feet wide."

== Composition ==
The album's title refers to the song "Jesus The Missing Years", which speculates upon the unrecorded middle 18 years of Christ's life. The surreal piece features, among other things, Jesus traveling to France and Spain, marrying an Irish bride, inventing Santa Claus, and opening a show for country singer George Jones. "All The Best" dealt with the theme of divorce, with the singer commenting before a performance of the song on Irish TV in 1990, "Country songs and country songwriters are a strange lot. Seems like some of the best country songs over the years have come from some of the sadder situations in life - like divorce. Having recently acquired my second divorce, about a month later the song truck pulled up and dumped a bunch of great songs on my lawn."

In the Great Days anthology, Prine recalls that "The Sins Of Memphisto" was written under pressure from producer Epstein: "We were 12 cuts into The Missing Years, and Howie says, 'We need one or two more cuts.' And I went, 'You're kidding. From where? We've been working for nine months. I don't have anything hiding on the shelf. You could take an autopsy, and you won't find a song inside of me.' So I went and locked myself in a hotel room and went, 'If he wants a song, he'll get a song.' I tried to write one from as far in left field as I could and came up with 'Memphisto'." Prine biographer Eddie Huffman calls the song "a casually visionary song about loss of innocence, relationships, sex, aging, and the passage of time, one of the most remarkable in Prine's catalog, effortlessly tying together various lyrical threads from throughout his career as a songwriter."

The Missing Years also features "Take A Look At My Heart" (co-written with rocker John Mellencamp) and collaborations with Keith Sykes and British songwriter Roger Cook. Prine covers the Lefty Frizzell classic "I Want To Be With You Always," while "Daddy's Little Pumpkin" was partly inspired by Mississippi John Hurt, who Pat McLaughlin reintroduced Prine to at the time. The album opener "Picture Show" (which features Tom Petty on background vocals) reflects Prine's lifelong love of movies and namechecks John Garfield, James Dean, and Montgomery Clift, while "It's a Big Old Goofy World" was inspired by his mother Verna's love of crossword puzzles.

== Reception ==
Professional ratings
Review scores
Source	Rating
Allmusic	4.5/5 stars
Robert Christgau	(A−)
Chicago Tribune	4/4 stars
Entertainment Weekly	(A−)
Encyclopedia of Popular Music	4/5 stars

The Missing Years was well received by critics and won the Grammy Award for Best Contemporary Folk Album. Writing for Allmusic, critic William Ruhlman wrote of the album "Prine took five years between his ninth studio album and this, his tenth—enough time to gather his strongest body of material in more than a decade...Prine's gifts for emotional revelation and off-the-wall humor are on display in abundance." Music critic Robert Christgau wrote "Occasionally too fantastic but never too bitter, the sagest and funniest of the new Dylans writes like he's resigned to an unconsummated life and sounds like he's enjoying one...I attribute its undeviating quality, gratifying variety, and amazing grace to talent, leisure time, and just enough all-star input. I wouldn't swear there's a stone classic here - just nothing I wouldn't be happy to hear again." Alanna Nash of Entertainment Weekly gave the album an A+ rating, writing "John Prine's best work has always been slightly cinematic and hallucinogenic, full of images that transport as well as provoke. There's plenty of that on this new album The Missing Years...While little here is stunning - except for the Dylanesque Take a Look at My Heart, a dear sucker letter to Prine's ex-old lady's boyfriend, with a subdued cameo vocal by Bruce Springsteen - all the songs are keepers, perfectly relaxed and wry." Critic Lynn Van Matre of the Chicago Tribune wrote "One of the singer-songwriter's strongest and most wittily observant efforts, the album finds Prine at the top of his form in a mix of evocative folk-country ballads and more rocking fare...Goofily surreal and straightforwardly sentimental by turns, this one's a don't-miss for longtime Prine fans and anyone else with a taste for idiosyncratic singer-songwriters." David Fricke observed in the Great Days anthology liner notes that Prine offers "a parcel songs that, for melodic charm, lyric whimsy, and emotional punch, were every bit the equal of those on John Prine. And this time, the music industry, and the general public, noticed."

== Track listing ==
All songs by John Prine unless otherwise noted.

1. "Picture Show" – 3:22
2. "All the Best" – 3:28
3. "The Sins of Memphisto" – 4:13
4. "Everybody Wants to Feel Like You" (Prine, Keith Sykes) – 3:09
5. "It's a Big Old Goofy World" – 5:10
6. "I Want to Be With You Always" (Lefty Frizzell, Jim Beck) – 3:01
7. "Daddy's Little Pumpkin" (Prine, Pat McLaughlin) – 2:41
8. "Take a Look at My Heart" (Prine, John Mellencamp) – 3:38
9. "Great Rain" (Prine (Words), Mike Campbell (Music)) – 4:08
10. "Way Back Then" – 3:39
11. "Unlonely" (Prine, Roger Cook) – 4:35
12. "You Got Gold" (Prine, Sykes) – 4:38
13. "Everything Is Cool" – 2:46
14. "Jesus the Missing Years" – 5:55

In July 2003, the label released a deluxe vinyl reissue of the album with a bonus track called "The Third of July" from Prine's appearance on the PBS concert series Sessions at West 54th in 2001.

== Personnel ==
- John Prine – Lead vocals, Acoustic Guitar, Electric Guitar
- Howie Epstein – Acoustic Guitar, Bass, Percussion, Additional Background Vocals
- John Jorgenson – Acoustic Guitar, Bass, Dobro, Saxophone/Bassoon/Clarinet, Mandolin
- David Lindley – Acoustic Guitar, Bouzouki/Fiddle/Harplex
- John Ciambotti – Bass
- Bob Glaub – Bass
- Benmont Tench – Bass, Organ, Piano, Harmonium
- Mike Campbell – Bass, Electric Guitar
- Joe Romersa – Drums, Percussion
- Albert Lee – Electric Guitar, Piano, Mandolin
- Phil Parlapiano – Accordion, Mandolin, Harmonium
- Steve Fishell – Dobro
- Mickey Raphael – Harmonica
- Richard Hardwick – Washboard
- Al Bunetta – Percussion
- Christina Amphlett – Background Vocals on "I Want To Be With You Always"
- Liz Byrnes – Background Vocals on "The Sins Of Memphisto"
- Phil Everly – Background Vocals on "You Got Gold"
- Tom Petty – Background Vocals on "Picture Show"
- Bonnie Raitt – Background Vocals on "Unlonely"
- Bruce Springsteen – Background Vocals on "Take A Look At My Heart"

== Production notes ==
- Howie Epstein – producer
- Al Bunetta – executive producer
- Dan Einstein – executive producer
- Joe Romersa – engineer
- Ed Seay – engineer, mixing
- Joe Chiccarelli – mixing
- Denny Purcell – mastering
- Mike Poole – assistant engineer, mixing assistant
- Dave Bossie – production assistant
- Susanne Smolka – design

== Bibliography ==
- Huffman, Eddie (2015). John Prine: In Spite of Himself. University of Texas Press. ISBN 9780292748224.
