= The Purple Bird =

Studio album by Bonnie "Prince" Billy
- Released: January 31, 2025
- Studio: The Cowboy Arms Hotel and Recording Spa; The Butcher Shack
- Genre: Folk; country
- Length: 43:35
- Label: Domino
- Producer: David Ferguson

Bonnie "Prince" Billy chronology
Keeping Secrets Will Destroy You (2023)	The Purple Bird (2025)	We Are Together Again (2026)

The Purple Bird is the thirtieth studio album by American singer Will Oldham. It was released under the name Bonnie "Prince" Billy on January 31, 2025.

== Background and composition ==
The Purple Bird was produced by David Ferguson, making it the second album on which Will Oldham has worked with a producer. It was recorded in Nashville, Tennessee.

A folk and country album, The Purple Bird consists of 12 tracks and has a runtime of 43 minutes.

== Release and reception ==
Professional ratings
Aggregate scores
Source	Rating
Metacritic	84/100
Review scores
Source	Rating
AllMusic	4.5/5 stars
Clash	7/10
The Observer	4/5 stars
The Independent	4/5 stars
MusicOMH	4/5 stars
Paste	7.8/10
Pitchfork	7.7/10
PopMatters	8/10
Uncut	4/5 stars
Under the Radar	6.5/10

The Purple Bird was released on January 31, 2025, through Domino. It is Oldham's thirtieth studio album, and follows Keeping Secrets Will Destroy You (2023).

Upon its release, The Purple Bird received positive reception from music critics. According to the review aggregator Metacritic, The Purple Bird received "universal acclaim" based on a weighted average score of 84 out of 100 from 16 critic scores.

== Track listing ==
No.	Title	Writer(s)	Length
1.	"Turned to Dust (Rolling On)"	Will Oldham; David Ferguson; Ronnie Bowman	4:04
2.	"London May"	Oldham	3:20
3.	"Tonight with the Dogs I'm Sleeping"	Oldham; Ferguson; Bowman; Tommy Prine	3:39
4.	"Boise, Idaho"	Oldham; Ferguson; Pat McLaughlin	3:46
5.	"The Water's Fine"	Oldham; Ferguson; John Anderson	4:25
6.	"Sometimes It's Hard to Breathe"	Oldham	3:46
7.	"New Water"	Oldham	3:39
8.	"Guns Are for Cowards"	Oldham	3:03
9.	"Downstream"	Oldham; Ferguson; Anderson	3:48
10.	"One of These Days (I'm Gonna Spend the Whole Night with You)"	Oldham; Ferguson; Roger Cook	3:50
11.	"Is My Living in Vain?"	Oldham^{[a]}	3:14
12.	"Our Home"	Oldham; Ferguson; Tim O'Brien	2:55
Total length:			43:35

Note

- ^{^[a]} Elbernita "Twinkie" Clark is credited for writing "Is My Living in Vain?"

== Personnel ==
- Will Oldham – lead vocals (all tracks), acoustic guitar (tracks 4–6, 10, 11)
- David Ferguson – production, mixing
- David Glasser – mastering
- Fred Eltringham – drums (all tracks), percussion (tracks 1, 3–8, 10, 12)
- Steve Mackey – bass
- Russ Pahl – electric guitar (all tracks), pedal steel (tracks 4, 10), steel guitar (6, 7), jaw harp (11), baritone guitar (12)
- Pat McLaughlin – mandolin (all tracks), additional singing (track 4), acoustic guitar (12)
- Stuart Duncan – fiddle (tracks 1–9, 11, 12), acoustic guitar (10, 12)
- Mike Rojas – keyboards (tracks 1–7, 9–12), accordion (4, 10, 12), piano (8)
- Brit Taylor – additional singing (tracks 1–4, 9, 10)
- Adam Chaffin – additional singing (tracks 1, 3, 4, 10)
- Mark Howard – banjo, additional singing (track 3)
- Leroy Troy – washboard (track 3)
- Tim O'Brien – additional singing (tracks 5, 12), mandolin (12)
- Roy Agee – trombone (tracks 7, 8)
- New Spahn Ranch Singers – additional singing (tracks 8, 12)
- Joey Miskulin – accordion, banjo (track 8)
- Matt Combs – violin, viola, cello, arco bass, bells (track 9)
- John Anderson – additional singing (tracks 9, 12)
- Eamon Dillon – uilleann pipes, whistle (track 9)
- D. Norsen – layout
- Lori Damiano – painting

== Charts ==
Chart performance for The Purple Bird
Chart (2025)	Peak position
Austrian Albums (Ö3 Austria)	57
Belgian Albums (Ultratop Flanders)	66
Dutch Albums (Album Top 100)	93
Scottish Albums (OCC)	20
UK Country Albums (OCC)	1
UK Album Downloads (OCC)	25
UK Independent Albums (OCC)	8
