= Dan Einstein =

American record producer (1960–2022)

Daniel LeVine Einstein (December 11, 1960 – January 15, 2022) was an American independent record producer. He founded Oh Boy Records with John Prine and Al Bunetta. In 1987, Einstein and co-producers Bunetta and Hank Neuberger won a Grammy for the Red Pajamas anthology A Tribute to Steve Goodman. In 1988, he won a second Grammy for producing the posthumous Steve Goodman album Unfinished Business. He died on January 15, 2022, at the age of 61.
