= Fair & Square (John Prine album) =

Studio album by John Prine
- Released: April 26, 2005
- Recorded: 2002–05
- Studio: Butcher Shoppe; Seventeen Grand; Minutia
- Genre: Country folk, Americana
- Label: Oh Boy
- Producer: John Prine, Gary Paczosa

John Prine chronology
| Souvenirs (2000) | Fair & Square (2005) | Standard Songs for Average People (2007) |

Fair & Square is the 15th studio album by American folk singer-songwriter John Prine, released on Oh Boy Records in 2005. It was rereleased in 2007 as a vinyl double-LP with four more bonus tracks, and in 2008 those four tracks were rereleased as an EP.

At the 48th Grammy Awards, Fair & Square won the Grammy Award for Best Contemporary Folk Album.

== Reception ==
Professional ratings
Review scores
| Source | Rating |
|---|---|
| AllMusic | 3.5/5 stars |
| Robert Christgau | |
| Freight Train Boogie | 5/5 stars |

Writing for AllMusic, critic Mark Deming wrote of the album "...the man on Fair and Square seems a good bit less scrappy and more contemplative than the guy who cut Prine's most memorable material... for the most part this album is an unusually spare and subdued effort from an artist who usually can't help but crack a smile; with any luck he'll be feeling a bit more hopeful next time out, though this is still great music for a quiet afternoon." Music critic Bill Frater wrote "There is a timeless quality to his songwriting style. He claims that the words just come to him without him having to do anything, but just write ‘em down. I don't doubt it; even random words like Constantinople can work if the right writer hears it. John Prine is indeed a songwriter's songwriter and we all should be so honest and trusting." Music critic Robert Christgau gave the album a 3-star Honorable Mention rating but 15 years later admitted that he underrated it.

== Track listing ==
All tracks composed by John Prine, except where indicated:

1. "Glory of True Love" (Prine, Roger Cook) – 4:12
2. "Crazy as a Loon" (Prine, Pat McLaughlin) – 5:03
3. "Long Monday" (Prine, Keith Sykes) – 3:22
4. "Taking a Walk" (Prine, McLaughlin) – 6:09
5. "Some Humans Ain't Human" – 7:03
6. "My Darlin' Hometown" (Prine, Roger Cook) – 3:14
7. "Morning Train" (Prine, McLaughlin) – 4:02
8. "The Moon Is Down" – 3:47
9. "Clay Pigeons" (Blaze Foley) – 4:27
10. "She Is My Everything" – 4:25
11. "I Hate It When That Happens to Me" (Prine, Donnie Fritts) – 2:49
12. "Bear Creek Blues" (A. P. Carter) – 4:45

Bonus tracks:

13. "Other Side of Town" (Live recording) – 4:53

14. "Safety Joe" – 3:58

The following bonus tracks are also found on the 2007 vinyl rerelease and on a 2008 EP:

1. "Carousel of Love"
2. "That's Alright By Me" (Prine, McLaughlin)
3. "That's How Every Empire Falls" (R.B. Morris)
4. "Dual Custody" (Prine, Roger Cook)

== Personnel ==
- John Prine – vocals, guitar
- John Wilkes Booth – mandolin
- Shawn Camp – guitar
- Jerry Douglas – Weissenborn
- Dan Dugmore – pedal steel guitar
- Paul Griffith – drums
- Pat McLaughlin – guitar, mandolin, harmony vocals, Wurlitzer
- Phil Parlapiano – accordion, piano, Hammond B3
- Dave Jacques – bass
- Jason Wilber – guitar
- Kenny Malone – percussion
- Roger Cook – ukulele, background vocals
- David Gerguson – bass
- Alison Krauss – harmony vocals
- Mindy Smith – harmony vocals
- Dan Tyminski – harmony vocals

== Chart positions ==
| Year | Chart | Position |
|---|---|---|
| 2005 | Billboard 200 | 55 |
| 2005 | Billboard Top Independent albums | 2 |
| 2005 | Billboard Top Internet albums | 55 |

== Cover versions ==
- In 2011, Chris Carrabba of Dashboard Confessional covered "Long Monday" on his album Covered in the Flood.
- Bright Eyes covered "Crazy as a Loon" during a 2007 AOL Music session. The band has covered the song live numerous times, both during standalone Bright Eyes/Conor Oberst shows and with John Prine himself.
