= Keeping Secrets Will Destroy You =

Studio album by Bonnie "Prince" Billy
- Released: August 11, 2023
- Length: 45:57
- Label: Drag City

Bonnie "Prince" Billy chronology
Blind Date Party (2021)	Keeping Secrets Will Destroy You (2023)	The Purple Bird (2025)

Keeping Secrets Will Destroy You is the twenty-first studio album by Bonnie "Prince" Billy, the stage name of American indie folk musician Will Oldham. It was released on August 11, 2023, through Drag City. The album was recorded in Oldham's home in Louisville, Kentucky, and preceded by the lead single "Bananas".

== Critical reception ==
Professional ratings
Aggregate scores
Source	Rating
Metacritic	84/100
Review scores
Source	Rating
AllMusic	4.5/5 stars
Exclaim!	7/10
Loud and Quiet	8/10
Pitchfork	7.7/10

Keeping Secrets Will Destroy You received a score of 84 out of 100 on review aggregator Metacritic based on seven critics' reviews, indicating "universal acclaim".

Reviewing for the album for AllMusic, Fred Thomas called it, "the kind of record that gets played over and over until it feels like a part of the listener's personal history" Mojo noted that it contains "a spare, homespun feel with its simple folk guitar", while Uncut deemed it "an open, compassionate record with a fierce spirit".

Marko Djurdjic of Exclaim! remarked that "the music throughout is unsurprisingly eclectic, with flourishes of country and flamenco, balladry and folk, and Oldham is backed by a more-than-competent band", also describing it as "a private album for mourning the state of the world and ourselves in it". Leo Lawton of Loud and Quiet concluded that "this record stands out because of its incredible thematic range. Such a well-rounded piece of work could only have been made by Bonnie Prince Billy himself, who has clearly lived life through his own fascinating, emotionally charged subjectivity".

== Track listing ==
All tracks are written by Will Oldham.

Keeping Secrets Will Destroy You track listing
No.	Title	Length
1.	"Like It or Not"	5:08
2.	"Behold! Be Held!"	3:25
3.	"Bananas"	2:43
4.	"Blood of the Wine"	4:24
5.	"Sing Them Down Together"	2:14
6.	"Kentucky Is Water"	4:06
7.	"Willow, Pine and Oak"	3:44
8.	"Trees of Hell"	4:00
9.	"Rise and Rule (She Was Born in Honolulu)"	6:05
10.	"Queens of Sorrow"	3:06
11.	"Crazy Blue Bells"	4:28
12.	"Good Morning, Popocatépeti"	2:34
Total length:		45:57

== Personnel ==
- Bonnie "Prince" Billy – guitars, vocals
- Sara Louise Callaway – violin
- Kendall Carter – keyboards
- Elisabeth Fuchsia – viola and violin
- Dave Howard – mandolin
- Drew Miller – saxophone
- Dane Waters – voice
- Emmett Kelly – "ding dongs"
- Nick Roeder – recording
- Carl Saff – mastering

== Charts ==
Chart performance for Keeping Secrets Will Destroy You
Chart (2023)	Peak position
Belgian Albums (Ultratop Flanders)	141
German Albums (Offizielle Top 100)	62
Scottish Albums (OCC)	18
Swiss Albums (Schweizer Hitparade)	92
UK Album Downloads (OCC)	40
UK Independent Albums (OCC)	7
