= We Are Together Again =

Studio album by Bonnie "Prince" Billy
- Released: March 6, 2026
- Studio: End of an Ear (Portland); Malbay (County Clare); Epiphany (New York City)
- Genre: Country
- Length: 47:04
- Label: Domino; No Quarter
- Producer: Jim Marlowe; Will Oldham

Bonnie "Prince" Billy chronology
The Purple Bird (2025)	We Are Together Again (2026)

Professional ratings
Aggregate scores
Source	Rating
Metacritic	82/100
Review scores
Source	Rating
AllMusic	4/5 stars
Far Out Magazine	3.5/5 stars
Paste	B
MusicOMH	3.5/5 stars

We Are Together Again is the thirty-first studio album by American singer Will Oldham. It was released under the name Bonnie "Prince" Billy on March 6, 2026.

== Background ==
We Are Together Again was co-produced by Oldham with Jim Marlowe and was recorded in End of an Ear Studios in Louisville, Kentucky.

The lead single "They Keep Trying to Find You" was released in January 2026 with a video directed and choreographed by Abi Elliott.

A second single, "Hey Little" was released in February 2026 featuring Catherine Irwin on vocals, Thomas Deakin on clarinet and string arrangements by Ryder McNair, and with a video directed by Brent Stewart and Maya Stewart.

The album also features Lacey Guthrie, Tory Fisher and Katie Peabody from the Louisville band Duchess on vocals on the opening and closing tracks, and musicians Jacob Duncan, Chris Bush, Ned Oldham and Erin Hill.

== Track listing ==
All tracks are written by Will Oldham.

We Are Together Again track listing
No.	Title	Length
1.	"Why Is the Lion?"	6:36
2.	"They Keep Trying to Find You"	4:37
3.	"Strange Trouble"	4:35
4.	"Life Is Scary Horses"	4:49
5.	"(Everybody's Got a) Friend Named Joe"	4:26
6.	"Vietnam Sunshine"	4:03
7.	"Hey Little"	3:46
8.	"Davey Dead"	5:17
9.	"The Children Are Sick"	4:36
10.	"Bride of the Lion"	4:19
Total length:		47:04

== Personnel ==
Credits adapted from the album's liner notes.

=== Musicians ===
- Will Oldham – performance
- Thomas Deakin – accordion, whistle, electric guitar, cornet, tuba, clarinet, vocals
- Jacob Duncan – saxophone, flute, piano, vocals
- Caleb Vasquez – percussion
- Charlie Bisharat – violin
- Camille Miller – violin
- Jake Braun – cello
- Zach Delinger – viola
- Ryder McNair – string arrangements (all tracks), piano (track 3)
- Ned Oldham – bass (1, 6, 10), vocals (6)
- Tory Fisher – vocals (1, 10)
- Lacey Guthrie – vocals (1, 10)
- Katie Peabody – vocals (1, 10)
- Nuala Kennedy – flute, vocals (1)
- Eamon O'Leary – bouzouki, vocals (1)
- Maggie Halfman – vocals (3, 5, 9)
- Sally Timms – vocals (4)
- Jim Marlowe – Moog (5), piano (8)
- Chris Cupp – bass (5)
- Catherine Irwin – vocals (6, 7)
- Chris Leidner – drums (6)
- Christopher Bush – tapes, electronics (8)
- Erin Hill – harp, vocals (8)

=== Technical ===
- Jim Marlowe – production, recording, mixing
- Will Oldham – production
- Seth Manchester – mastering
- Amy Dragon – lacquer cuts
- Martin O'Malley – recording for Nuala Kennedy (1)
- Jefferson Hamer – recording for Eamon O'Leary (1)
- D. Norsen – layout
- Danica Novgorodoff – cover painting
- Terry Way – back cover photo

== Charts ==
Chart performance for We Are Together Again
Chart (2026)	Peak position
Austrian Albums (Ö3 Austria)	24
Belgian Albums (Ultratop Flanders)	83
Belgian Albums (Ultratop Wallonia)	180
French Physical Albums (SNEP)	67
French Rock & Metal Albums (SNEP)	16
Scottish Albums (OCC)	20
Swiss Albums (Schweizer Hitparade)	38
UK Albums Sales (OCC)	28
UK Americana Albums (OCC)	9
UK Independent Albums (OCC)	12
