= German Afternoons =

Studio album by John Prine
- Released: 1986
- Studio: Cowboy Arms (Nashville, Tennessee); Jack's Tracks (Nashville, Tennessee)
- Genre: Folk
- Label: Oh Boy
- Producer: John Prine, Jim Rooney

John Prine chronology
Aimless Love (1984)	German Afternoons (1986)	John Prine Live (1988)

German Afternoons is the ninth album by American folk singer and songwriter John Prine, released in 1986.

== Recording ==
German Afternoons was Prine's second release on Oh Boy Records, the independent label he formed with his manager Al Bunetta, and delves further into the country-flavored sound established on his 1984 release Aimless Love. Like Aimless Love, German Afternoons was co-produced by Nashville veteran Jim Rooney but also features contributions from the progressive bluegrass band New Grass Revival as well as Marty Stuart, and this accounts for Prine's return to the folk-sound of his early albums on songs like "Lulu Walls" and "Paradise", the latter a rerecording of the self-penned classic which appeared on the singer's debut John Prine in 1971. The album was recorded in Nashville.

== Composition ==
Perhaps the most significant song that appears on German Afternoons is "The Speed of the Sound of Loneliness", which became a concert staple and an instant classic for many Prine devotees. Writing in Great Days: The John Prine Anthology, critic David Fricke describes the song as "a hypnotic song of lovesick melancholia set to a simple, mid-tempo rhythm that sounded like the desolate ticking of a hall way clock." "Yeah, that came out all at once," Prine revealed to Paul Zollo of Bluerailroad. "From a broken relationship I was in. I could not understand what went wrong and I had to explain to myself, and I did it through this song. The next day I thought, Jesus, that’s beautiful. I didn’t recognize it at the time, it was just pouring out of me." Prine was nearing the end of his marriage to musician Rachel Peer-Prine, who sang harmony on several German Afternoon tracks, and producer Jim Rooney recalled in his own memoir, "John and Rachel were having a very up-and-down time of it, but the resulting songs might have been worth all the trouble. Perhaps the best song to come out of the turmoil generated by Rachel and John’s relationship was the aptly titled ‘Speed of the Sound of Loneliness.’" Two songs hearken back to the singer’s roots. Prine had ended his 1972 LP with the Carter Family song "Diamonds in the Rough," and here he kicks off the album with a rollicking arrangement of A.P. Carter's "Lulu Walls." Prine also covers the Leon Payne classic "They’ll Never Take Her Love from Me," made famous by Hank Williams, another key influence on Prine. The album comes full circle with a remake of "Paradise," one of Prine's most famous songs that appeared on his debut album in 1971. He later explained: "The song over the years had turned into such a bluegrass standard...the first version of ‘Paradise,’ in order to get a fiddle part on it, we had to ask a guy from the Memphis symphony to come in and play the violin like a fiddle, and I always remember that, and I wanted to make a more of a bluegrass version of it."

In the Great Days anthology, Prine revealed that "Bad Boy" had been inspired by Merle Haggard and that it was "a really proud song about guilt. 'I'm proud to be guilty, I've been a bad boy again.' Around that time, I fell under the spell of Merle Haggard's songwriting. There was a period there when he just seemed to be churning out some really great stuff. He was bringing out great albums every six or eight months, and I considered "Bad Boy" sort of in the vein of what he was doing." Prine added that Willie Nelson had told him he wanted to cut "Linda Goes To Mars" ("I just can't imagine him doing it, although I bet it would be good," Prine wrote). The song, a comic variation on "Angel from Montgomery", is about a woman who mentally checked out of her marriage from time to time, told from the husband's point of view.

"I Just Want To Dance with You", co-written by Prine and Roger Cook, was released in April 1998 by American country singer George Strait as the first single to his album One Step at a Time and became his 34th Number One single on the Billboard Hot Country Singles & Tracks (now Hot Country Songs) chart. It was also a hit for Daniel O'Donnell in 1992, reaching 20 in the UK charts. "Love, Love, Love," a different slant on romantic disconnection, was co-written with Keith Sykes, who opened for Prine at the Bitter End years before, while Rodney Crowell protégé Bill Caswell teamed up with Prine to write "Out of Love," a corny tune full of references to beer commercials. Prine wrote "If She Were You" with his friend Steve Goodman, who had died the same year after a long battle with leukemia. The novelty song "Let's Talk Dirty In Hawaiian" was rerecorded and released as a single in 1987.

Prine would later say that the album title, which People joked in its review was "probably the worst album title in pop music history," was not a throwback to his own army service but rather came from a friend: "I had this guy explain to me once that a German afternoon is like you go into town with some errands to run and stuff to do but then you run into an old buddy you haven't seen. And you drop into a bar for just a minute and start to talk. And next thing you know it's already evening and you've just spent a German afternoon."

== Reception ==
Professional ratings
Review scores
Source	Rating
AllMusic	3/5 stars
Robert Christgau	B+

German Afternoons received a Grammy Award nomination for Best Contemporary Folk Recording. Writing for AllMusic, critic Jim Smith says of the album, "...this is a sleepy-town stroll, featuring snappy accompaniment by the New Grass Revival." Music critic Robert Christgau wrote, "...this relaxed, confident album is where Prine comes out and admits he's a folkie...The songs are straightforward and homemade..." Prine biographer Eddie Huffman opines that the LP "was a lively, enjoyable, and well-written album by a pro hitting his stride in middle age."

== Track listing ==
1. "Lulu Walls" (A. P. Carter) – 2:37
2. "Speed of the Sound of Loneliness" (John Prine) – 3:29
3. "Out of Love" (Bill Caswell, Prine) – 3:17
4. "Sailin' Around" (John Burns, Prine)– 3:25
5. "If She Were You" (Steve Goodman, Prine) – 3:35
6. "Linda Goes to Mars" (Prine) – 3:06
7. "Let's Talk Dirty in Hawaiian" (Fred Koller, Prine) (CD version only) – 3:13
8. "I Just Want to Dance with You" (Roger Cook, Prine) – 3:28
9. "Love, Love, Love" (Keith Sykes, Prine) – 3:00
10. "Bad Boy" (Prine) – 3:28
11. "They'll Never Take Her Love From Me" (Leon Payne) – 3:07
12. "Paradise" (Prine) – 3:28

== Personnel ==
- John Prine – vocals, guitar
- Sam Bush – mandolin
- Philip Donnelly – guitar
- Stuart Duncan – fiddle
- Roy Huskey Jr. – bass
- Alan O'Bryant – vocals
- Jim Rooney – guitar
