= Tommy Prine =

American singer-songwriter

- Born: October 4, 1995 (age 30)
- Origin: Nashville, Tennessee
- Genres: Alternative country, Americana
- Instruments: Vocals, guitar
- Years active: 2022–present
- Label: Nameless Knight Records
- Spouse: Savannah Prine
- Website: https://www.tommyprine.com/

Tommy Prine is an American singer-songwriter. He is the youngest son of folk musician John Prine. After his father's death in 2020, Prine decided to pursue a musical career.

== Early life ==
Prine was born October 4, 1995, to country-folk musician John Prine and Irish-born costume designer Fiona Whelan. The family lived in Nashville, Tennessee, and summered in Ireland. At the age of 10, Tommy learned how to fingerpick from his father. As a teenager, Prine traveled with his father's tour primarily to assist with merchandise, then occasionally joining him on stage for the encore. Prine studied at Pellissippi State. There was a period when Prine was involved in drugs. In addition, his loss of two friends to drug overdoses negatively impacted his mental state. Prine reconnected with his childhood friend Savannah, and subsequently proposed to her in Ireland, using his father's wedding ring.

While Prine endeavored to create distinct and independent music from his father, his influence is remembered by everything from covering John Prine songs, to writing songs about his father, and inscribing ‘John Prine’ on his guitar. While Prine is often compared to his father, he developed his own path while acknowledging the legacy of his award-winning father.

== Career ==
=== 2022 ===
Prine's debut single "Ships in the Harbor" was released on September 8, 2022. "Turning Stones" was co-written with Ruston Kelly and was made available in October 2022.

=== 2023 ===
Prine's debut album "This Far South" was released on June 23, 2023. It was co-produced by Ruston Kelly and Nashville engineer and producer Gena Johnson.

The accompanying North American tour included 28 cities from May 2023 through March 2024. Prine debuted at Nashville's Grand Ole Opry on December 8, 2023.

=== 2024 ===
Prine was featured on PBS NewsHour on January 2, 2024. The segment shared his life story and beginnings of his musical career.

== Personal life ==
Prine and his wife, Savannah, have a son who was born in September 2025.
