= Baptist Retirement Home =

- U.S. National Register of Historic Places
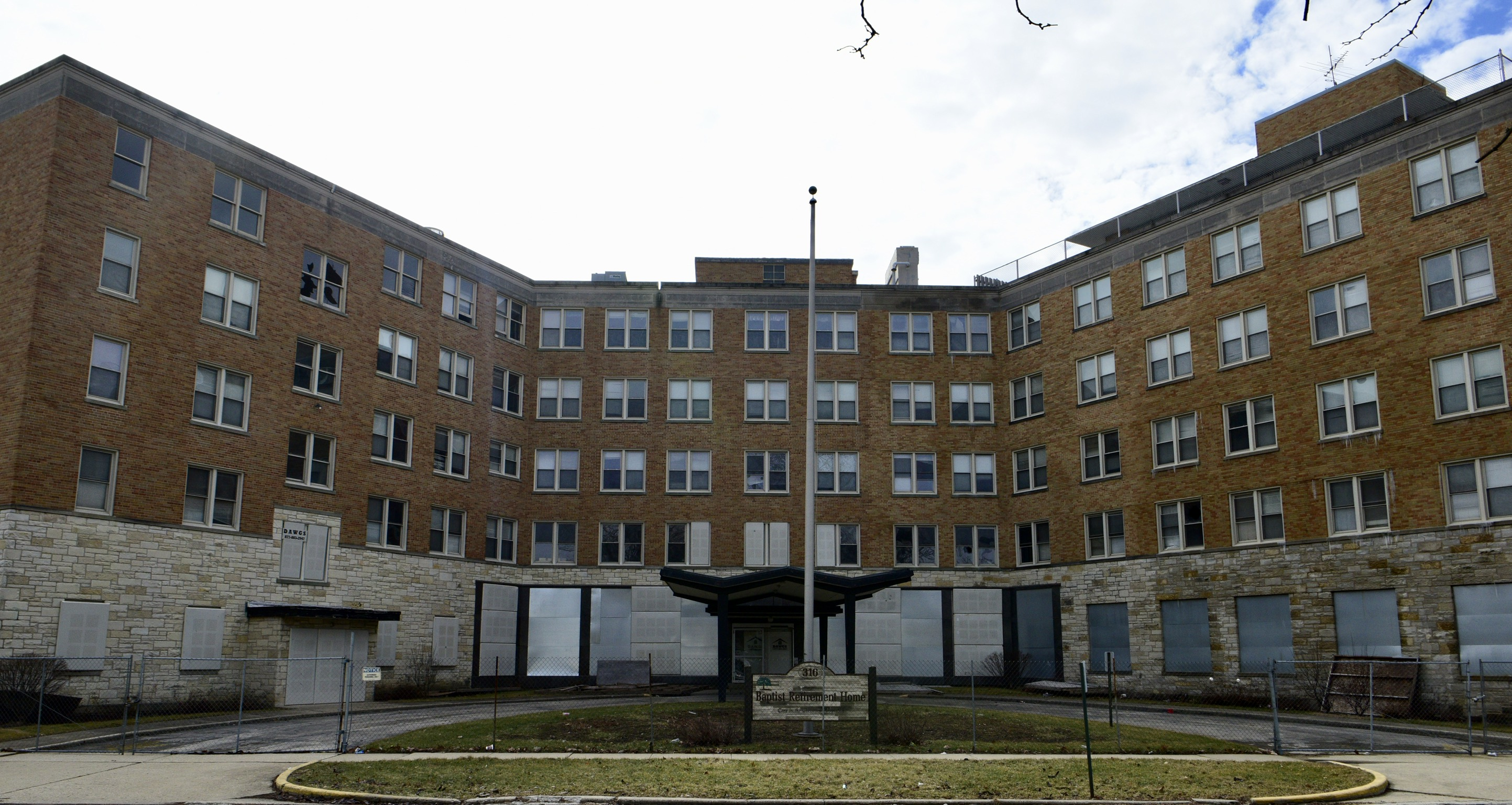

- Location within Chicago metropolitan area Location within Illinois Location within the United States
- Location: 316 Randolph St., Maywood, Illinois
- Coordinates: 41°53′04″N 87°50′14″W
- Built: 1930
- Architect: Elmer C. Roberts
- Architectural style: Tudor Revival
- NRHP reference No.: 100001765
- Added to NRHP: October 26, 2017

The Baptist Retirement Home is a historic retirement home at 316 Randolph Street in Maywood, Illinois. The home was built in 1930 for the Baptist Old People's Home organization, which was founded in Maywood in 1906; the large-scale building replaced its original, smaller facilities. At the time, retirement care was shifting from family-centered to institutional practices, and the elderly began to choose retirement home living instead of being forced there by a lack of family or money. When it opened, the facility was racially segregated and only admitted white residents; it also restricted membership to members of the Baptist faith who were over seventy years old. Architect Elmer C. Roberts designed the Tudor Revival building, which features half-timbering on its upper stories, towers enclosing its stairwells, and projecting bays topped by crenellated parapets. Additions were placed on the building in 1955 and 1965 to expand its capacity.

The building was added to the National Register of Historic Places on October 26, 2017. It still operates as a retirement home under the name Maywood Supportive Living.
