= In Spite of Ourselves =

Studio album by John Prine (with various accompanists)
- Released: September 28, 1999
- Recorded: August–October 1997, mid 1998, December 1998–99
- Studios: Cowboy Arms (Nashville, Tennessee); Jack's Tracks (Nashville, Tennessee)
- Genres: Folk, alt-country, Americana
- Length: 43:23
- Label: Oh Boy
- Producers: Jim Rooney, John Prine

John Prine chronology
Live on Tour (1997)	In Spite of Ourselves (1999)	Souvenirs (2000)

In Spite of Ourselves is the 13th studio album of John Prine, featuring duets of classic country songs with various well-known female folk and alt-country vocalists, released in 1999.

The album was Prine's first release since surviving throat cancer. The female duet partners include Iris DeMent, Connie Smith, Lucinda Williams, Trisha Yearwood, Melba Montgomery, Emmylou Harris, Dolores Keane, Patty Loveless, and his wife, Fiona Prine.

== Reception ==
Professional ratings
Review scores
Source	Rating
Allmusic	4.5/5 stars
Robert Christgau	(A)
Freight Train Boogie	4/5 stars
No Depression	(no rating)
Encyclopedia of Popular Music	4/5 stars

Writing for Allmusic, critic Michael B. Smith wrote the album "ranks as one of Prine's finest works, a scrapbook of country classics, interpreted by some of the genre's best female vocalists, in duet with one fine American singer and a great songwriter." Music critic Bill Frater wrote "To begin with, long-time John Prine fans might be a little put off by this new release. There is only one Prine-penned song in the bunch, In Spite of Ourselves, the title track... I love this album, and I applaud Prine proclaiming his love for these kinds of songs." Robert Christgau gave the album an A rating, and had particular praise for Iris DeMent, writing "... the costar is Iris DeMent, who kills on both the Bobby Braddock cornpone of "(We're Not) The Jet Set" (rhymes with "Chevro-let set") and the conflicted spouse-swapping of the impossible old George & Melba hit "Let's Invite Them Over"—as well as Prine's only new copyright, the title track, in which a husband and wife who love each other to death paint totally different pictures of their marriage."

Critic David Cantwell of No Depression specifically singled out the title track as the best duet on the album and wrote that the album "is a solid collection of country duets, and if nothing else, it proves that Prine has great taste in old country songs... not to mention great taste in what used to be called "girl singers."

== Track listing ==
No.	Title	Writer(s)	Duet partner	Length
1.	"(We're Not) The Jet Set"	Bobby Braddock	Iris DeMent	2:34
2.	"So Sad (To Watch Good Love Go Bad)"	Don Everly	Connie Smith	2:28
3.	"Wedding Bells/Let's Turn Back the Years"	Claude Boone/Hank Williams	Lucinda Williams	3:45
4.	"When Two Worlds Collide"	Bill Anderson; Roger Miller	Trisha Yearwood	2:20
5.	"Milwaukee Here I Come"	Lee Fikes	Melba Montgomery	2:20
6.	"I Know One"	Jack Clement	Emmylou Harris	2:39
7.	"It's a Cheating Situation"	Curly Putman; Sonny Throckmorton	Dolores Keane	2:54
8.	"Back Street Affair"	Billy Wallace	Patty Loveless	2:46
9.	"Loose Talk"	Freddie Hart; Ann Lucas	Connie Smith	2:43
10.	"Let's Invite Them Over"	Onie Wheeler	Iris DeMent	2:09
11.	"'Til a Tear Becomes a Rose"	Bill Rice; Sharon Rice	Fiona Prine	2:48
12.	"In A Town This Size"	Kieran Kane	Dolores Keane	3:30
13.	"We Could"	Felice Bryant	Iris DeMent	2:16
14.	"We Must Have Been Out of Our Minds"	Melba Montgomery	Melba Montgomery	2:15
15.	"In Spite Of Ourselves"	John Prine	Iris DeMent	3:32
16.	"Dear John (I Sent Your Saddle Home)"	Tex Ritter; Aubrie A. Gass		2:24
Total length:				43:23

== Chart performance ==
Chart (1999)	Peak position
U.S. Billboard Top Country Albums	21
U.S. Billboard 200	197
