= Hello In There (song) =

"Hello in There"

Song by John Prine

from the album John Prine
- Released: July 1971
- Recorded: American Recording Studios, Memphis, Tennessee
- Genre: Folk
- Length: 4:29
- Label: Atlantic
- Songwriter: John Prine
- Producer: Arif Mardin

"Hello in There" is a song written by American singer-songwriter John Prine. The song deals with themes of isolation as a result of growing old.

== Background ==
Prine wrote the song when he was 22, stating: "I delivered to a Baptist old people’s home where we’d have to go room-to-room... and some of the patients would kind of pretend that you were a grandchild or nephew that had come to visit, instead of the guy delivering papers. That always stuck in my head." Prine also went on to state that some of the names of the characters in the song come from real-life sources, such as Rudy being the name of a neighbor's dog.

== Other versions ==
Bette Midler included it in her first studio album The Divine Miss M in 1972. David Allan Coe's 1983 album is titled Hello in There and features a cover of the title song. Scottish singer-songwriter Eddi Reader recorded the song for her 1992 album Mirmama. In 2020, Jason Isbell covered the song for the Alzheimer's Association's Music Moments compilation: according to Isbell, John Prine is one of his favorite songwriters. Roger Waters recorded a cover of the song as part of his The Lockdown Sessions, released between 2020 and 2021. His version features backing vocals by Jess Wolfe and Holly Laessig of the band Lucius.

== The Hello in There Foundation ==
After John Prine's death from COVID-19 in 2020, Prine's family established the Hello in There Foundation. While also honoring Prine himself, the foundation aims to support marginalized groups and persons.
