= John Prine =

American singer-songwriter (1946–2020)

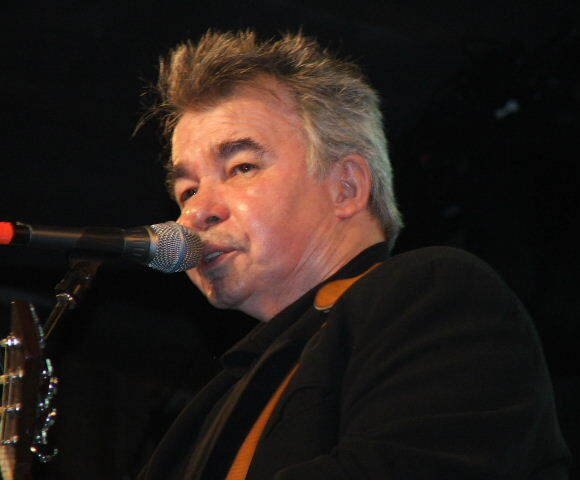
- Prine performing at MerleFest in 2006

Background information
- Born: John Edward Prine; October 10, 1946; Maywood, Illinois, U.S.
- Died: April 7, 2020 (aged 73) Nashville, Tennessee, U.S.
- Genres: Country-folk; progressive country; Americana
- Occupations: Singer; songwriter; musician
- Instruments: Vocals; guitar
- Years active: 1969–2020
- Labels: Atlantic; Asylum; Oh Boy; Rhino
- Spouses: Ann Carole (m. 1966; div. 1982) Rachel Peer (m. 1984; div. 1988) Fiona Whelan (m. 1996)
- Website: JohnPrine.com

John Edward Prine (/praɪn/; October 10, 1946 – April 7, 2020) was an American singer-songwriter of country-folk music. Widely cited as one of the most influential songwriters of his generation, Prine was known for his signature blend of humorous lyrics about love, life, and current events, often with elements of social commentary and satire, as well as sweet songs and melancholy ballads. He was active as a composer, recording artist, live performer, and occasional actor from the early 1970s until his death.

Born and raised in Maywood, Illinois, Prine learned to play the guitar at age 14. He attended classes at Chicago's Old Town School of Folk Music. After serving in West Germany with the U.S. Army, he returned to Chicago in the late 1960s, where he worked as a mailman, writing and singing songs first as a hobby. Continuing studies at the Old Town School, he performed at a student hang-out, the nearby Fifth Peg. A praising review by Roger Ebert put Prine on the map. Singer-songwriter Kris Kristofferson heard Prine at Steve Goodman's insistence, and Kristofferson invited Prine to be his opening act. Prine released his eponymous debut album in 1971. Featuring such songs as "Paradise", "Sam Stone", and "Angel from Montgomery", it has been hailed as one of the greatest albums of all time.

The acclaim Prine earned from his debut led to three more albums for Atlantic Records. Common Sense (1975) was his first to chart on the Billboard U.S. Top 100. He then recorded three albums with Asylum Records. In 1981, he co-founded Oh Boy Records, an independent label which released all of his music up until his death. His final album, 2018's The Tree of Forgiveness, debuted at No. 5 on the Billboard 200, his highest ranking on the charts.

Prine struggled with health issues throughout his life, surviving cancer twice. He died in 2020 from complications caused by COVID-19. Earlier the same year, he received the Grammy Lifetime Achievement Award.

== Early life ==
Prine was the son of William Mason Prine, a tool-and-die maker, and Verna Valentine (Hamm), a homemaker, both originally from Muhlenberg County, Kentucky. He was born and raised in the Chicago suburb of Maywood. In summers, they would go back to visit family near Paradise, Kentucky. Prine started playing guitar at age 14, taught by his brother, David. He attended classes at Chicago's Old Town School of Folk Music, and graduated from Proviso East High School in Maywood, Illinois. He was a U.S. Postal Service mailman for five years and was drafted into the United States Army during the Vietnam War, serving as a vehicle mechanic in West Germany before beginning his musical career in Chicago.

== Career ==
=== Chicago folk scene ===
In the late 1960s, while Prine was delivering mail, he began to sing his songs (often first written in his head on the mail route) at open mic nights at the Fifth Peg on Armitage Avenue in Chicago. The bar was a gathering spot for nearby Old Town School of Folk Music teachers and students. Prine was initially a spectator, reluctant to perform, but eventually did so in response to a "You think you can do better?" comment made to him by another performer. After his first open mic, he was offered paying gigs. In 1970, Chicago Sun-Times film critic Roger Ebert heard Prine by chance at the Fifth Peg and wrote his first printed review, "Singing Mailman Who Delivers A Powerful Message In A Few Words":

He appears on stage with such modesty he almost seems to be backing into the spotlight. He sings rather quietly, and his guitar work is good, but he doesn't show off. He starts slow. But after a song or two, even the drunks in the room begin to listen to his lyrics. And then he has you....Prine's lyrics work with poetic economy to sketch a character in just a few words.

After the review was published, Prine's popularity grew. He became a central figure in the Chicago folk revival, which also included such singer-songwriters as Steve Goodman, Michael Peter Smith, Bonnie Koloc, Jim Post, Tom Dundee, Anne Hills, Gary Growden and Fred Holstein. Joined by such established musicians as Jethro Burns and Bob Gibson, Prine performed frequently at a variety of Chicago clubs. He was offered a one-album deal of covers and with a few of his original songs, by Bob Koester from Delmark Records, but decided the project was not right for him.

In 1971, Prine was playing regularly at the Earl of Old Town and The Dangling Conversation coffeehouse. Steve Goodman, who was performing with Kris Kristofferson at another Chicago club, persuaded Kristofferson to go see Prine late one night. Kristofferson later recalled, "By the end of the first line we knew we were hearing something else. Twenty-four years old and writes like he's two-hundred and twenty. It must've been like stumbling onto Dylan when he first busted onto the Village scene."

=== 1970s ===
Prine's eponymous debut album was released in 1971. Kristofferson invited Prine and Goodman to open for him at The Bitter End in New York City. In the audience was Jerry Wexler, who signed Prine to Atlantic Records the next day. The album included Prine's signature songs "Illegal Smile" and "Sam Stone". "Sam Stone" is about the trauma of a Vietnam veteran. He explained in 2011:

I knew there were a lot of GIs out there, who came out of the war and they weren’t quite right. … I knew there were homes where nobody was talking to each other, which became "Angel from Montgomery". … I knew there were kids who didn’t have fathers, and nobody ever acknowledged it, which became "6 O’Clock News."… I saw all that. I knew, and I couldn’t figure out why no one would say anything.

"Paradise" is about the effects of surface mining on his parents' hometown of Paradise, Kentucky. The album also featured "Hello in There", a song about aging that was later covered by numerous artists, and "Far From Me", a lonely waltz about lost love for a waitress, which Prine later said was his favorite of all his songs. The album received many positive reviews, and some hailed Prine as "the next Dylan". Bob Dylan himself appeared unannounced at one of Prine's first New York City club appearances, anonymously backing him on harmonica.

Prine's second album, Diamonds in the Rough (1972), was a surprise for many after the critical success of his first LP; it was an uncommercial, stripped-down affair that reflected Prine's fondness for bluegrass music and features songs reminiscent of Hank Williams. Highlights of the compilation include the allegorical "The Great Compromise", which includes a recitation and addresses the Vietnam War, and the ballad "Souvenirs", which Prine later recorded with Goodman.

His subsequent albums from the 1970s include Sweet Revenge (1973), containing such fan favorites as "Dear Abby", "Grandpa Was a Carpenter", and "Christmas in Prison", and Common Sense (1975), with "Come Back to Us Barbara Lewis Hare Krishna Beauregard". The latter album was Prine's first to chart on the U.S. Top 100 by Billboard and reflected his growing commercial success. It was produced by Steve Cropper. Bruised Orange (1978) is a Steve Goodman–produced album that gave listeners songs such as "That's The Way That The World Goes 'Round", "Sabu Visits the Twin Cities Alone", "Fish and Whistle", and the title track.

In 1974, singer David Allan Coe achieved considerable success on the country charts with "You Never Even Called Me by My Name", co-written by Prine and Goodman. The song good-naturedly spoofs stereotypical country music lyrics to create what it calls "the perfect country and western song". Prine refused to take a songwriter's credit (stating he was too drunk when the song was written to remember what he had contributed) and Goodman received sole credit. Goodman bought Prine a jukebox as a gift from his publishing royalties.

In 1975, Prine toured the U.S. and Canada with a full band featuring guitarist Arlen Roth.

Pink Cadillac (1979) features two songs produced by Sun Records founder Sam Phillips, who by this time rarely did any studio work. The song "Saigon" is about a Vietnam veteran traumatized by the war ("The static in my attic's gettin' ready to blow"). During the recording, one of the guitar amplifiers blew up (which is evident on the album). The other song Phillips produced is "How Lucky", about Prine's hometown.

=== 1980s ===
In 1981, rejecting the established model of the recording industry, which Prine felt exploited singers and songwriters, he co-founded the independent record label Oh Boy Records in Nashville, Tennessee. His fans, supporting the project, sent him enough money to cover the costs, in advance, of his next album. Prine continued writing and recording albums throughout the 1980s. His songs continued to be covered by other artists; the country supergroup The Highwaymen recorded "The 20th Century Is Almost Over", written by Prine and Goodman. Steve Goodman died of leukemia in 1984 and Prine contributed four tracks to A Tribute to Steve Goodman, including a cover version of Goodman's "My Old Man".

=== 1990s ===
In 1991, Prine released the Grammy-winning The Missing Years, his first collaboration with producer and Heartbreakers bassist Howie Epstein. The title song records Prine's humorous take on what Jesus did in the unrecorded years between his childhood and ministry.

In 1992, Prine performed a duet with Margo Timmins on "If You Were the Woman and I Was the Man" from the album Black Eyed Man by Cowboy Junkies. The two acts embarked on a co-headlining tour through 1992, touring on their respective album releases and performing duets between Prine and Timmins in each set.

In 1995, Lost Dogs and Mixed Blessings was released, another collaboration with Epstein. On this album is the long track "Lake Marie", a partly spoken word song interweaving tales over decades centered on themes of "goodbye". Bob Dylan later cited it as perhaps his favorite Prine song. Prine followed it up in 1999 with In Spite of Ourselves, which was unusual for him in that it contained only one original song (the title track); the rest were covers of classic country songs. All of the tracks are duets with well-known female country vocalists, including Lucinda Williams, Emmylou Harris, Patty Loveless, Dolores Keane, Trisha Yearwood, and Iris DeMent.

=== 2000s ===
Prine appeared in a supporting role in the Billy Bob Thornton movie Daddy & Them (2001). "In Spite of Ourselves" is played during the end credits.

Prine recorded a version of Stephen Foster's "My Old Kentucky Home" in 2004 for the compilation album Beautiful Dreamer, which won the Grammy for Best Traditional Folk Album.

In 2005, Prine released his first all-new offering since Lost Dogs and Mixed Blessings, the album Fair & Square, which tended toward a more laid-back, acoustic approach. The album contains songs such as "Safety Joe", about a man who has never taken any risks in his life, and also "Some Humans Ain't Human", Prine's protest piece on the album, which talks about the ugly side of human nature and includes a quick shot at President George W. Bush. Fair & Square won the 2005 Grammy Award for Best Contemporary Folk Album. The album contains original songs plus two covers: A.P. Carter's "Bear Creek Blues" and Blaze Foley's "Clay Pigeons".

=== 2010s ===
On June 22, 2010, Oh Boy Records released a tribute album titled Broken Hearts & Dirty Windows: Songs of John Prine. The album features members of the modern folk revival, including My Morning Jacket, The Avett Brothers, Conor Oberst and the Mystic Valley Band, Old Crow Medicine Show, Lambchop, Josh Ritter, Drive-By Truckers, Nickel Creek's Sara Watkins, Deer Tick featuring Liz Isenberg, Justin Townes Earle, Those Darlins, and Bon Iver's Justin Vernon.

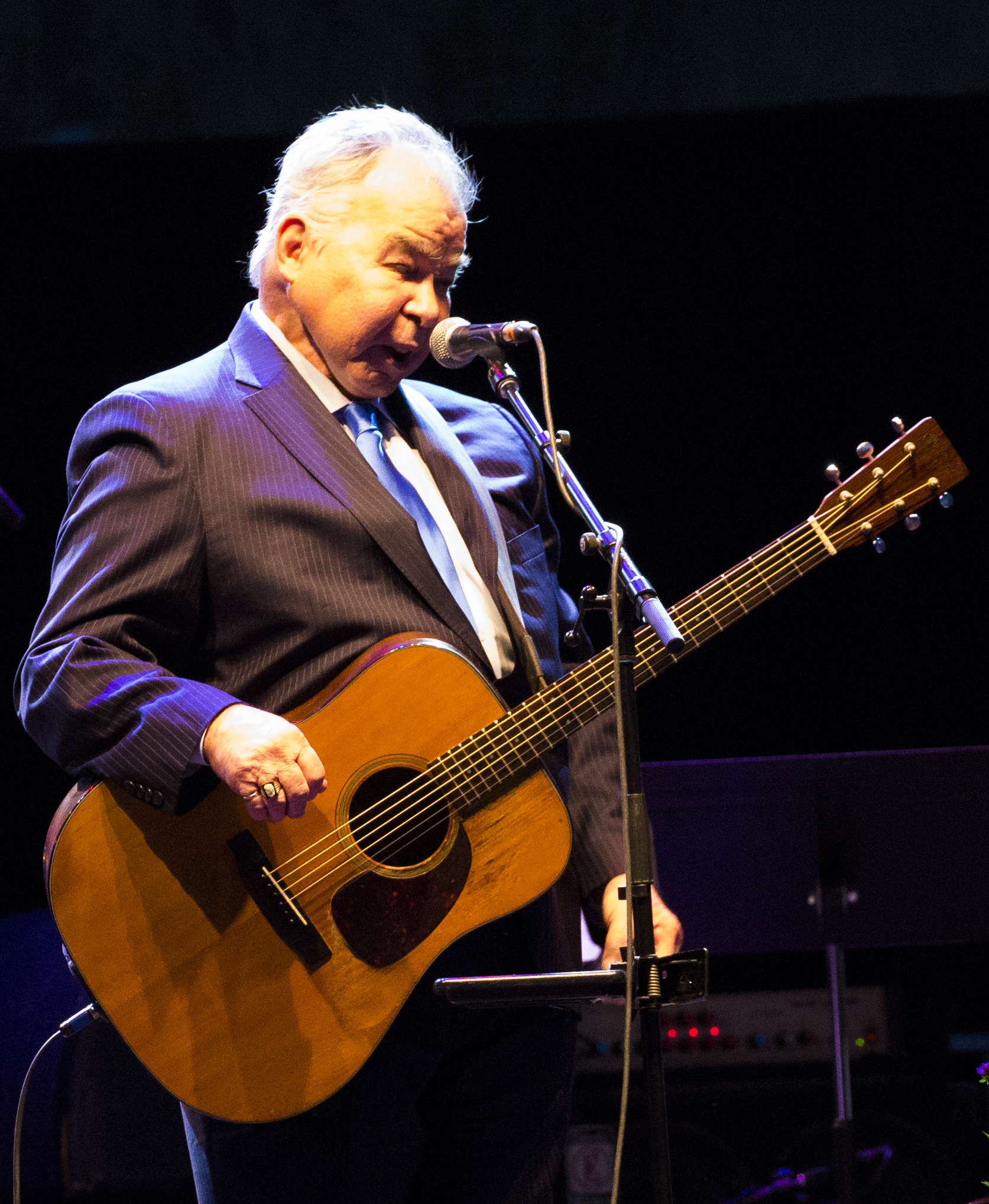
John Prine (age 69) on-stage (2016).

In 2016, Prine was named winner of the PEN/Song Lyrics Award, given to two songwriters every other year by the PEN New England chapter. The 2016 award was shared with Tom Waits and his songwriting collaborator wife Kathleen Brennan. Judges for the award included Peter Wolf, Rosanne Cash, Paul Simon, Elvis Costello, and Bono, as well as literary judges Salman Rushdie, Natasha Tretheway, and Paul Muldoon. In 2016, Prine released For Better, or Worse, a follow-up to In Spite of Ourselves. The album features country music covers spotlighting some of the most prominent female voices in the genre, including; Alison Krauss, Kacey Musgraves, and Lee Ann Womack, as well as Iris DeMent, the only guest artist to appear on both compilation albums.

On March 15, 2017, the American Currents exhibit opened at the Country Music Hall of Fame. The exhibit featured a pair of cowboy boots and jacket that Prine often wore on stage, his personal guitar, and the original handwritten lyric to his hit, "Angel From Montgomery". The American Currents Class of 2016 showcased artists who made a significant impact on country music in 2016, including, Prine. Prine won his second Artist of the Year award at the 2017 Americana Music Honors & Awards after previously winning in 2005.

On February 8, 2018, Prine announced his first new album of original material in 13 years, titled The Tree of Forgiveness, would be released on April 13. Produced by Dave Cobb, the album was released on Prine's own Oh Boy Records and features guest artists Jason Isbell, Amanda Shires, Dan Auerbach, and Brandi Carlile. Alongside the announcement, Prine released the track "Summer's End". The album became Prine's highest-charting album on the Billboard 200.

Prine's final recording session was in 2019, where he recorded "Please Let Me Go 'Round Again" with longtime friend Swamp Dogg.

=== Posthumous releases ===
The last song Prine recorded before he died was "I Remember Everything", released on June 12, 2020, alongside a music video. It was released following the two-hour special tribute show, A Tribute Celebrating John Prine aired on June 11, 2020, which featured Sturgill Simpson, Vince Gill, Jason Isbell, Kacey Musgraves, Bonnie Raitt, Rita Wilson, Eric Church, Brandi Carlile and many other country artists and friends. On the first night of the 2020 Democratic National Convention, Prine singing "I Remember Everything" was the soundtrack to the COVID-19 memorial video.

== Personal life ==
=== Marriages ===
Prine was married three times. His first marriage was to high school sweetheart Ann Carole on December 26, 1966. The marriage lasted until the late 1970s, and they legally divorced in 1982.

Prine was married to bassist Rachel Peer from 1984 to 1988.

Prine met Fiona Whelan, who later became his manager, in 1988. She moved from Ireland to Nashville in 1993, and married him in 1996.

Prine and Whelan had two sons together, Jack and Tommy, and Prine adopted Whelan's son, Jody, from a previous relationship.

Prine had a home in Kinvara, Galway, Ireland, and spent part of the year there.

=== Health problems ===
In early 1998, Prine was diagnosed with squamous-cell cancer on the right side of his neck. He had major surgery to remove a substantial amount of diseased tissue, followed by six weeks of radiation therapy. The surgery removed a piece of his neck and severed a few nerves in his tongue, while the radiation damaged some salivary glands. A year of recuperation and speech therapy were necessary before he could perform again. The operation altered his vocals and added a gravelly tone to his voice.

In 2013, Prine underwent surgery to remove cancer in his left lung. After the surgery, a physical therapist put him through an unusual workout to build stamina: Prine was required to run up and down his house stairs, grab his guitar while still out of breath, and sing two songs. Six months later, he was touring again.

=== Death ===
On March 19, 2020, amid the COVID-19 pandemic in the United States, Prine's wife Fiona revealed that she had tested positive for SARS-CoV-2 and had been quarantined in their home apart from him. He was hospitalized on March 26 after experiencing COVID-19 symptoms. On March 30, Fiona tweeted that she had recovered and that John was in stable condition but not improving. Prine died on April 7, 2020, of complications caused by COVID-19 at the age of 73.

In accordance with Prine's lyrical wishes, expressed in his song "Paradise", some of his ashes were spread in Kentucky's Green River. Additional ashes were buried next to his parents in Chicago.

== Influence ==
Prine is widely regarded as one of the most influential songwriters of his generation. He has been referred to as "the Mark Twain of songwriting".

Bob Dylan named Prine one of his favorite songwriters in 2009. He remarked, "Prine's stuff is pure Proustian existentialism. Midwestern mindtrips to the nth degree. And he writes beautiful songs. All that stuff about 'Sam Stone', the soldier junkie daddy, and 'Donald and Lydia', where people make love from ten miles away. Nobody but Prine could write like that."

Johnny Cash, in his autobiography Cash, wrote, "I don't listen to music much at the farm, unless I'm going into songwriting mode and looking for inspiration. Then I'll put on something by the writers I've admired and used for years—Rodney Crowell, John Prine, Guy Clark, and the late Steve Goodman are my Big Four ..."

Roger Waters, when asked by Word Magazine in 2008 if he heard Pink Floyd's influence in newer British bands such as Radiohead, replied, "I don't really listen to Radiohead. I listened to the albums and they just didn't move me in the way, say, John Prine does. His is just extraordinarily eloquent music—and he lives on that plane with Neil [Young] and [John] Lennon." He later named Prine as among the five most important songwriters.

Prine's influence is seen in the work of younger artists, whom he often mentored, including Jason Isbell, Amanda Shires, Brandi Carlile, Sturgill Simpson, Kacey Musgraves, Margo Price, Tyler Childers, and Robin Pecknold.

The night that Steve Goodman introduced John Prine to Kris Kristofferson and Paul Anka has been commemorated in a musical show entitled Chicago 1971 that was developed by John Ballantyne and Gus Noble.

== Awards and honors ==
=== Grammy Awards ===
Prine won four Grammy Awards out of 13 nominations, as well as a Grammy Lifetime Achievement Award.

Grammy Awards and nominations for John Prine
Year	Nominated work	Category	Result
1972	John Prine	Best New Artist	Nominated
1986	German Afternoons	Best Contemporary Folk Recording	Nominated
1988	John Prine Live	Best Contemporary Folk Recording	Nominated
1991	The Missing Years	Best Contemporary Folk Album	Won
1995	Lost Dogs and Mixed Blessings	Best Contemporary Folk Album	Nominated
1997	Live on Tour	Best Contemporary Folk Album	Nominated
1999	In Spite of Ourselves	Best Contemporary Folk Album	Nominated
2005	Fair & Square	Best Contemporary Folk Album	Won
2018	The Tree of Forgiveness	Best Americana Album	Nominated
2018	"Summer's End"	Best American Roots Song	Nominated
2018	"Knockin' on Your Screen Door"	Best American Roots Song	Nominated
2020	John Prine	Lifetime Achievement Award	Won
2021	"I Remember Everything"	Best American Roots Performance	Won
2021	"I Remember Everything"	Best American Roots Song	Won

=== Other accolades ===
- In 2005, at the request of U.S. Poet Laureate Ted Kooser, John Prine became the first singer-songwriter to read and perform at the Library of Congress.
- In 2016, Prine received the PEN New England Song Lyrics of Literary Excellence Award.
- In 2019, Prine was inducted into the Songwriters Hall of Fame with a speech by Bonnie Raitt.
- Over his career, Prine received six awards from the Americana Music Honors & Awards: the Lifetime Achievement Award for Songwriting (2003), Artist of the Year (2005, 2017, 2018), Song of the Year for "Summer's End" (2019), and Album of the Year for The Tree of Forgiveness (2019).
- On June 30, 2020, Illinois's Governor J. B. Pritzker posthumously named Prine the honorary Poet Laureate of Illinois.
- The John Prine Songwriter Fellowship was created in Prine's honor. In 2022, Leith Ross became the first recipient.
- In 2026, Chicago held a five-day celebration of Prine surrounding what would have been his 80th birthday, including a mayoral proclamation that October 10, 2026 was John Prine Day. The celebration included a concert, the dedication of a mural of Prine, a sing-a-long, and various other activities.

== Discography ==
The week after his death, Prine hit number one on Billboard's Rock Songwriters Chart because his singles ("In Spite Of Ourselves", "Angel from Montgomery", "Hello In There", "When I Get To Heaven", and "That's the Way the World Goes Round") all charted in the top 25 of the Hot Rock Song Chart. On the Billboard 200, his 1971 debut album re-entered the chart at 55, and his last album, 2018's Tree of Forgiveness, re-entered at 109.

=== Studio albums ===
John Prine studio albums
Year	Album	Peak chart positions						Label
Year	Album	US	US Country	US Indie	US Rock	US Folk	CAN	Label
1971	John Prine: Released: October 1971; Label: Atlantic; Format:	55	—	—	—	—	—	Atlantic
1972	Diamonds in the Rough: Released: 1972; Label: Atlantic; Format:	148	—	—	—	—	—	Atlantic
1973	Sweet Revenge: Released: October 1973; Label: Atlantic; Format:	135	—	—	—	—	—	Atlantic
1975	Common Sense: Released: 1975; Label: Atlantic; Format:	66	—	—	—	—	—	Atlantic
1978	Bruised Orange: Released: 1978; Label: Asylum; Format:	116	—	—	—	—	—	Asylum
1979	Pink Cadillac: Released: 1979; Label: Asylum; Format:	152	—	—	—	—	—	Asylum
1980	Storm Windows: Released: 1980; Label: Asylum; Format:	144	—	—	—	—	—	Asylum
1984	Aimless Love: Released: 1984; Label: Oh Boy; Format: Cassette, CD	—	—	—	—	—	—	Oh Boy
1986	German Afternoons: Released: 1986; Label: Oh Boy; Format:	—	—	—	—	—	—	Oh Boy
1991	The Missing Years: Released: September, 1991; Label: Oh Boy; Format:	—	—	—	—	—	—	Oh Boy
1993	A John Prine Christmas: Released: 1993; Label: Oh Boy; Format: CD, Cassette	—	—	—	—	—	—	Oh Boy
1995	Lost Dogs + Mixed Blessings: Released: April 4, 1995; Label: Oh Boy; Format: CD, Cassette	159	—	—	—	—	—	Oh Boy
1999	In Spite of Ourselves: Released: September 14, 1999; Label: Oh Boy; Format: CD, Cassette	197	21	—	—	—	—	Oh Boy
2000	Souvenirs: Released: October 31, 2000; Label: Oh Boy; Format: CD	—	—	—	—	—	—	Oh Boy
2005	Fair & Square: Released: April 26, 2005; Label: Oh Boy; Format: CD, LP	55	—	2	—	—	—	Oh Boy
2007	Standard Songs for Average People (with Mac Wiseman): Released: April 24, 2007; Label: Oh Boy; Format: CD	—	—	37	—	—	—	Oh Boy
2016	For Better, or Worse: Released: September 30, 2016; Label: Oh Boy; Format: CD, LP	30	2	7	—	5	—	Oh Boy
2018	The Tree of Forgiveness: Released: April 13, 2018; Label: Oh Boy; Format: CD, LP	5	2	2	2	1	26	Oh Boy
"—" denotes releases that did not chart

=== Live albums ===
John Prine live albums
Year	Album	Peak chart positions			
Year	Album	US	US Indie	US Rock	US Folk
1988	John Prine Live: Released: 1988; Label: Oh Boy; Format: CD, cassette, LP	—	—	—	—
1997	Live on Tour: Released: April 8, 1997; Label: Oh Boy; Format: CD, Cassette	—	—	—	—
2010	In Person & On Stage: Released: May 25, 2010; Label: Oh Boy; Format: CD	85	—	27	1
2011	Singing Mailman Delivers: Released: October 25, 2011; Label: Oh Boy; Format: CD, LP	94	20	22	4
2015	September '78: Released: October 27, 2017; Label: Oh Boy; Format: CD	—	—	—	—
2021	Live At The Other End Dec. 1975: Released: July 17, 2021; Label: Atlantic; Format: CD, LP	—	—	—	—
2026	Live at Old Town School of Folk: Released: June 12, 2026; Label: Oh Boy; Format: Digital download	—	—	—	—
"—" denotes releases that did not chart

=== Compilation albums ===
John Prine compilation albums
Year	Album	Peak chart positions	Label
Year	Album	US	Label
1976	Prime Prine: The Best of John Prine	196	Atlantic
1993	Great Days: The John Prine Anthology	—	Rhino

Other appearances
Year	Song	Album
1992	"If You Were the Woman and I Was the Man" (duet with Margo Timmins)	Black Eyed Man - Cowboy Junkies
1994	"Lonely Just Like Me"	Adios Amigo: A Tribute to Arthur Alexander
2004	"My Old Kentucky Home"	Beautiful Dreamer: The Songs of Stephen Foster
2010	"This Guitar Is for Sale"	Twistable, Turnable Man: A Musical Tribute to the Songs of Shel Silverstein

John Prine guest singles
Year	Single	Artist	Peak positions	Album
Year	Single	Artist	US Country	Album
1992	Sweet Suzanne	Buzzin' Cousins	68	Falling from Grace soundtrack 1992 "Speed Of The Sound Of Loneliness" Gene Clark & Carla Olson on their album Silhouetted In Light
2013	Yes We Will	Maria Doyle Kennedy 2020 "If You Don't Want My Love" Phil Seymour on the album If You Don't Want My Love	–	Sing
2020	Memories	Swamp Dogg	–	Sorry You Couldn't Make It
2020	Please Let Me Go Around Again	Swamp Dogg	–	Sorry You Couldn't Make It
2020	How Lucky	Kurt Vile	–	Speed, Sound, Lonely KV (ep)

John Prine video albums
Year	Title	Label
2001	John Prine – Live from Sessions at West 54th	Oh Boy Records Music Video

John Prine music videos
Year	Video	Director
1992	"Picture Show"	Jim Shea
1992	"Sweet Suzanne" (Buzzin' Cousins)	Marty Callner
1993	"Speed of the Sound of Loneliness" (featuring Nanci Griffith)	Rocky Schenck
1995	"Ain't Hurtin' Nobody"	Jim Shea
2016	"Fish and Whistle (Lyric Video)"	Northman Creative
2016	"I'm Telling You" (featuring Holly Williams)	Joshua Britt and Neilson Hubbard
2016	"Color of the Blues" featuring Susan Tedeschi	Joshua Britt and Neilson Hubbard
2017	"Sweet Revenge"	Oh Boy Records
2017	"In Spite of Ourselves"	Oh Boy Records
2018	"The Road to 'The Tree of Forgiveness'"	Oh Boy Records
2018	"Knockin' On Your Screen Door"	David McClister
2018	"Knockin' On Your Screen Door (Lyric Video)"	David McClister
2018	"God Only Knows (Lyric Video)"	Joshua Britt and Neilson Hubbard
2018	"Summer's End"	Kerrin Sheldon and Elaine McMillion Sheldon
2018	"Summer's End (Lyric Video)"	Oh Boy Records
2018	"When I Get to Heaven (Lyric Video)"	Oh Boy Records
2018	"Egg & Daughter Nite, Lincoln, Nebraska, 1967 (Crazy Bone)"	Oh Boy Records
2019	"My Old Kentucky Home, Goodnight"	Oh Boy Records
2020	"I Remember Everything"	Oh Boy Records

Awards
Preceded by Billy Joe Shaver	AMA Lifetime Achievement Award for Songwriting; 2003	Succeeded by Cowboy Jack Clement
Preceded by Loretta Lynn	AMA Artist of the Year; 2005	Succeeded by Neil Young
