= Oh Boy Records =

American independent record label

- Founded: 1981
- Founder: John Prine, Al Bunetta, Dan Einstein
- Distributor: Secretly Distribution
- Genre: American folk, Americana, country
- Country of origin: U.S.
- Location: Nashville, Tennessee
- Official website: www.ohboy.com

Oh Boy Records is an independent American record label founded in 1981 by singer John Prine, his manager Al Bunetta, and their friend Dan Einstein. The label has released more than 40 audio and video recordings by singer-songwriters including Prine, Kris Kristofferson, Daniel "Slick" Ballinger, Shawn Camp, Dan Reeder, Todd Snider and Kelsey Waldon, along with a dozen reissues of classic country music artists. Oh Boy Records also manages two subsidiary labels: Steve Goodman's Red Pajamas Records and the Mountain Stage label Blue Plate Music. Oh Boy is based in Nashville, Tennessee and is managed by Fiona Whelan Prine.

From 2016 to 2024, the label was distributed by Thirty Tigers. Since August 2024, Oh Boy Records has been distributed by Secretly Distribution.

== History ==
Al Bunetta was a talent manager with Paul Anka's management company CMA, working with artists such as Bette Midler, Al Green, and The Manhattan Transfer. When Anka signed John Prine and Steve Goodman to management contracts in 1971, Bunetta became the manager for both of them. In 1980, Prine finished his recording contract with Asylum and moved to Nashville. Rather than sign with another major label, he decided to start one of his own, and was joined by Bunetta and associate Dan Einstein. The new Oh Boy label's first release was a red vinyl Christmas single with Prine singing "I Saw Mommy Kissing Santa Claus" on the A-side and "Silver Bells" on the B-side. The first full-length release, completely funded in advance by fans, was Prine's Aimless Love in 1984. Around 1989, Sony offered to buy Oh Boy Records, but Prine decided to keep the label independent and turned down the offer. In 1996, Oh Boy established a chat page for Prine fans that evolved into one of the first Internet music communities.

== Recent projects ==
In 2000, the label began reissuing a series of classic country music artists titled Oh Boy Classics Presents... These are remastered versions of the original recordings. The first three artists in this series were Roger Miller, Willie Nelson, and Merle Haggard. In 2007, Oh Boy released Standard Songs for Average People, an album of classic country duets by Prine and bluegrass singer Mac Wiseman. In February 2010, singer-songwriter Dan Reeder released his album This New Century, using instruments he made himself.

The release of a new Prine live album in 2010, In Person & On Stage, was followed by Broken Hearts & Dirty Windows, a tribute album of Prine songs performed by artists such as Sara Watkins and Old Crow Medicine Show. Both of these 2010 releases debuted at number one on the Billboard Folk Album charts.

In April 2018, John Prine released Tree of Forgiveness produced by Dave Cobb. This was Prine's first album of original works in 13 years. Guest artists on the album include Brandi Carlile, Jason Isbell, Amanda Shires, and Dan Auerbach.

In 2019, the label signed singer-songwriter Kelsey Waldon. The female outlaw country singer is Oh Boy's first artist signing in 15 years.

In December 2019, Oh Boy Records signed Sacramento, California-based indie folk-singer Tre Burt. Burt was introduced to the label by Jody Whelan, who had discovered the folk singer's album Caught It from the Rye.

In June 2020, Oh Boy Records signed Ohio-based country singer Arlo McKinley, marking him as the last signee by John Prine.

== See also ==
- List of record labels
