= Golden Hits of Jerry Lee Lewis =

The Golden Hits of Jerry Lee Lewis

Studio album by Jerry Lee Lewis
- Released: January 1964
- Recorded: 1963
- Studio: Philips Recording Studio, Nashville, Tennessee
- Genre: Rock and roll, rockabilly
- Label: Smash
- Producer: Shelby Singleton

Jerry Lee Lewis chronology
Jerry Lee's Greatest! (1961)	The Golden Hits of Jerry Lee Lewis (1964)	Live at the Star Club, Hamburg (1964)

The Golden Hits of Jerry Lee Lewis is the third studio album by American musician Jerry Lee Lewis. It was released on Smash Records in 1964, and was Lewis's first album with the label after leaving Sun Records.

== Background ==
One of Smash's first decisions was to record a retread of his Sun hits, which may have been inspired by the continuing enthusiasm Europe an audiences had shown for Lewis's brand of rock and roll.

== Reception ==
The Golden Hits of Jerry Lee Lewis was released on January 1, 1964, making the charts briefly before vanishing (it peaked at number 40). Matt Fink of AllMusic argues that "Great Balls of Fire," "Whole Lotta Shakin' Goin' On," "Breathless" and "High School Confidential" are given an "overall bigger, booming sound with backup vocalists and a brass section, but most would probably still give the originals pre-eminence."

== Track listing ==
Side A

1. "Whole Lotta Shakin' Going On" (Dave "Curlie" Williams, Sunny David)
2. "Fools like Me" (Jack Clement, Murphy Maddox)
3. "Great Balls of Fire" (Otis Blackwell, Jack Hammer)
4. "I'll Make It All Up to You" (Charlie Rich)
5. "Down the Line" (Roy Orbison)
6. "End of the Road" (Jerry Lee Lewis)

Side B

1. "Breathless" (Otis Blackwell)
2. "Crazy Arms" (Ralph Mooney, Chuck Seals) – 2:41
3. "You Win Again" (Hank Williams)
4. "High School Confidential" (Ron Hargrave, Jerry Lee Lewis) – 2:27
5. "Break-Up" (Charlie Rich)
6. "Your Cheatin' Heart" (Hank Williams)

== Personnel ==
Technical

- Billy Sherrill – recording engineer
- John Hester, Ray Butts – assistant engineer
