= Jerry Lee Lewis (1958 album) =

Studio album by Jerry Lee Lewis
- Released: 1958
- Recorded: 1958
- Genres: Rock and roll, rockabilly
- Length: 27:30
- Label: Sun LP-1230
- Producers: Sam Phillips, Jack Clement

Jerry Lee Lewis chronology
Jerry Lee Lewis (1958)	Jerry Lee's Greatest! (1961)

Singles from Jerry Lee Lewis
- 1. "Crazy Arms" Released: December 1956; 2. "High School Confidential/Fools like Me" Released: May 1958

Jerry Lee Lewis is the debut studio album by American musician Jerry Lee Lewis, released in 1958 on Sun Records.

== Background and content ==
The album featured Lewis's hit "High School Confidential", but producer Sam Phillips did not include Lewis's bigger hits such as "Great Balls of Fire" and "Whole Lotta Shakin' Going On." The album is sometimes referred to as High School Confidential.

The back cover of the LP feature a large picture of Sun Records President Sam Phillips admiring Lewis at the piano in the famous studio at 706 Union Avenue in Memphis, Tennessee. Phillips, then working to promote his latest star Lewis, also wrote the liner notes for the album noting that Lewis "is regarded as the very epitome of rock and roll" In keeping with an occasional record industry practice of the time (1958) the album was also released in 45 rpm format, the twelve songs being divided over a series of three 7-inch extended play (EP) records, Sun EPs 108, 109 and 110 (pictured). The album is currently available on CD, featuring bonus tracks from his first EP, "The Great Ball of Fire" (Sun EP 107).

Cub Koda described the selections found on Jerry Lee Lewis as "a curious mixture" with "a great deal of his best material [being] inexplicably left off", but the album still being a "terrific debut".

== Track listing ==
Side A
No.	Title	Writer(s)	Length
1.	"Don't Be Cruel"	Otis Blackwell	2:00
2.	"Goodnight Irene"	Huddie Ledbetter	2:52
3.	"Put Me Down"	Roland Janes	2:06
4.	"It All Depends"	Billy Mize	2:57
5.	"Ubangi Stomp"	Charles Underwood	1:44
6.	"Crazy Arms"	Ralph Mooney; Chuck Seals	2:41
Total length:			14:20

Side B
No.	Title	Writer(s)	Length
7.	"Jambalaya"	Hank Williams	1:57
8.	"Fools like Me"	Jack Clement; Murphy Maddux	2:48
9.	"High School Confidential"	Jerry Lee Lewis; Ron Hargrave	2:27
10.	"When the Saints Go Marching In"	Traditional	2:06
11.	"Matchbox"	Carl Perkins	1:40
12.	"It'll Be Me"	Jack Clement	2:12
Total length:			13:10
