= Memphis Music Hall of Fame =

- Interactive map of Memphis Music Hall of Fame
- Address: 126 S 2nd St; Memphis, Tennessee; United States
- Coordinates: 35.140437°N 90.053610°W
- Type: Theater and museum
- Public transit: MATA; Main Street Line; Riverfront Loop

Website
- http://memphismusichalloffame.com/

The Memphis Music Hall of Fame, located in Memphis, Tennessee, honors Memphis musicians for their lifetime achievements in music. The induction ceremony and concert is held each year in Memphis. Since its establishment in 2012, the Hall of Fame has inducted more than 48 individuals or groups. It is administered by the non-profit Memphis Rock N' Soul Museum. In July 2015, the Memphis Music Hall of Fame opened a 'brick and mortar' museum and exhibit hall, which features memorabilia, video interviews, and interactive exhibits.

== History ==
The Memphis Music Hall of Fame, created as a tribute to the city's wide-ranging role in the fields of blues, gospel, jazz, R&B, country, rockabilly and hip-hop, was launched on November 29, 2012, featuring an induction ceremony for its first 25 honorees at the Cannon Center for the Performing Arts.

Each inductee into the Memphis Music Hall of Fame receives the Mike Curb Award, named after songwriter, producer and record company owner, Mike Curb. Annual inductees are selected by a Nominating Committee composed of nationally recognized authors, producers, historians and leaders in the music industry. The number of annual inductees may vary.

On August 1, 2015, the Memphis Music Hall of Fame opened its museum and exhibition hall at 126 S. 2nd Street between the Hard Rock Cafe and Lansky Brothers' Clothier. The museum features memorabilia and other archival materials from nearly all of the 60 inductees.

== Inductees ==
=== 2012 ===
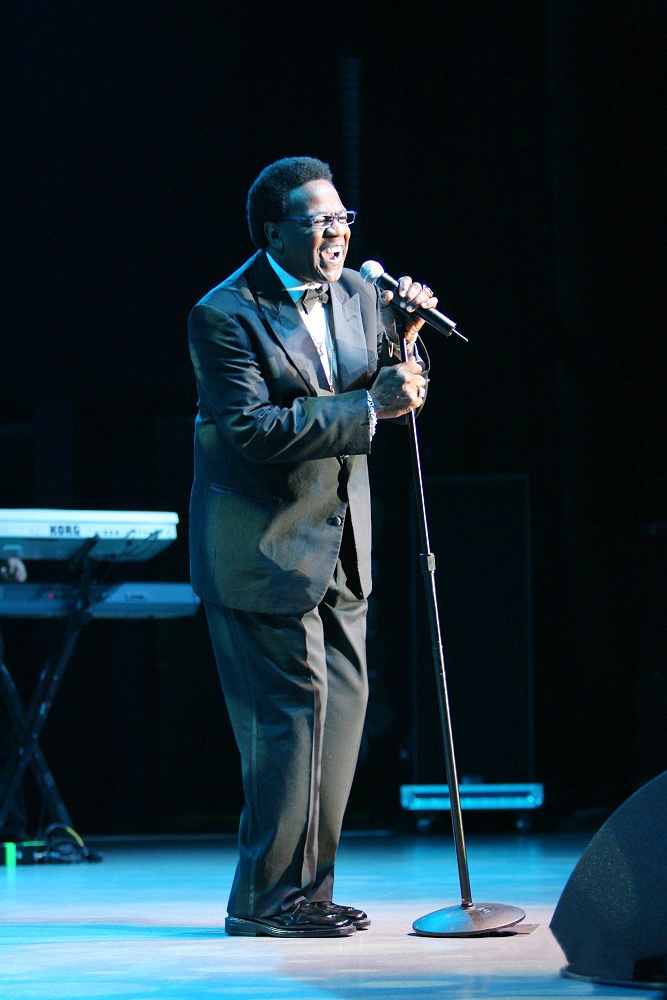
Al Green

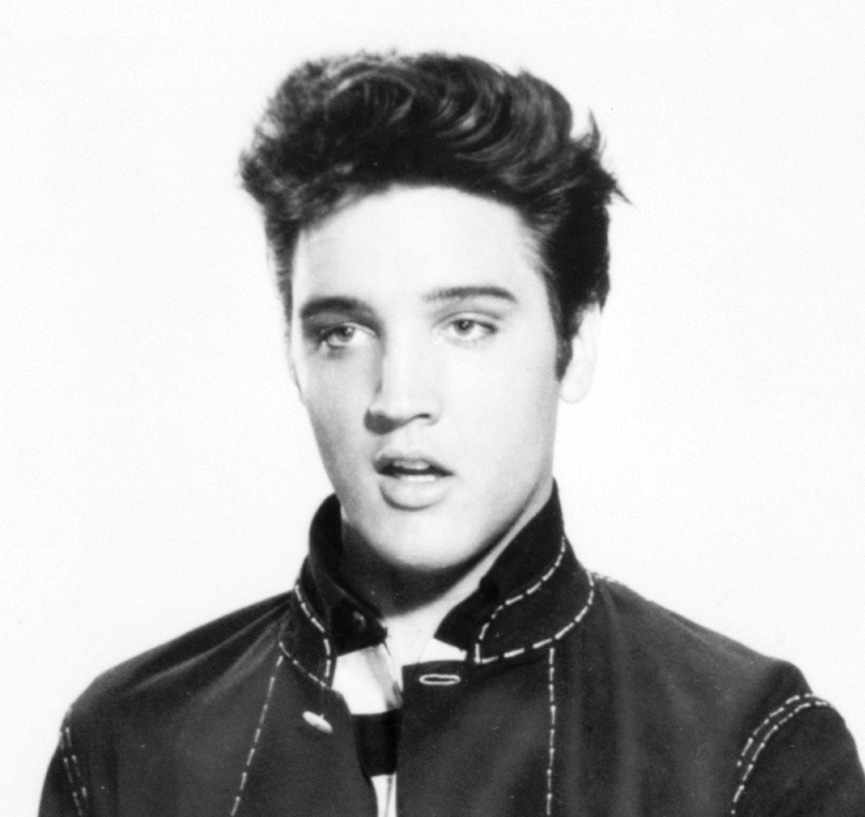
Elvis Presley

- Jim Stewart & Estelle Axton
- Bobby "Blue" Bland
- Booker T. & the M.G.'s
- Lucie Campbell
- George Coleman
- Jim Dickinson
- Al Green
- W.C. Handy
- Isaac Hayes
- Howlin' Wolf
- B.B. King
- Jerry Lee Lewis
- Jimmie Lunceford
- Professor W.T. McDaniel
- Memphis Minnie
- Willie Mitchell
- Dewey Phillips
- Sam Phillips
- Elvis Presley
- Otis Redding
- The Staple Singers
- Rufus Thomas
- Three 6 Mafia
- Nat D. Williams
- ZZ Top

=== 2013 ===
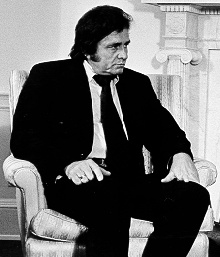
Johnny Cash

- The Bar-Kays
- The Blackwood Brothers
- Rev. Herbert Brewster
- Johnny Cash
- Roland Janes
- Albert King
- Memphis Jug Band
- Phineas Newborn, Jr.
- David Porter
- Sid Selvidge
- Kay Starr
- Carla Thomas

=== 2014 ===
- Lil Hardin Armstrong
- Al Bell
- Big Star
- John Fry
- Furry Lewis
- Chips Moman
- Ann Peebles
- Carl Perkins
- Jesse Winchester

=== 2015 ===
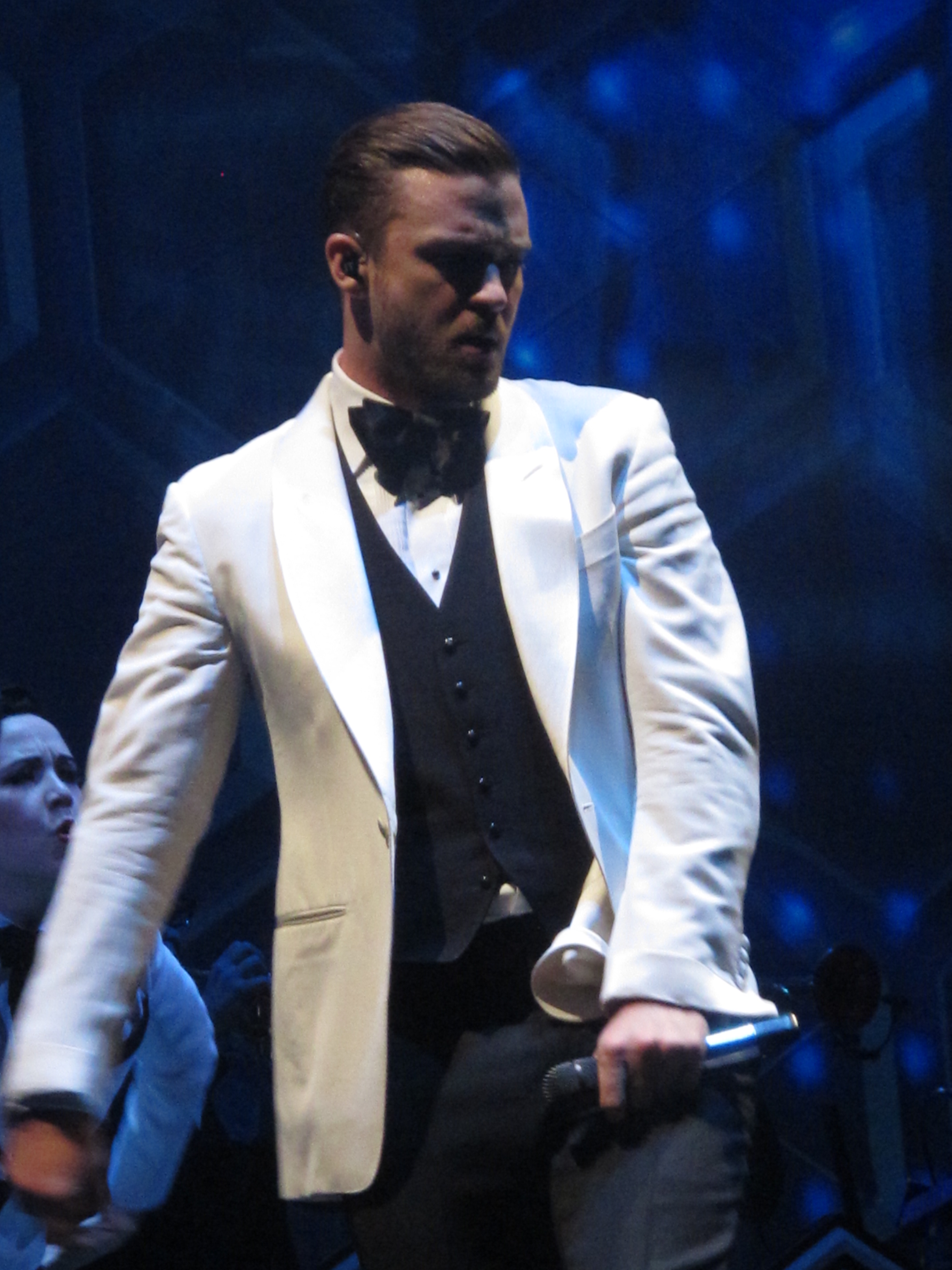
Justin Timberlake

- Alberta Hunter
- Al Jackson, Jr.
- Memphis Slim
- Scotty Moore
- Charlie Rich
- Sam & Dave
- Justin Timberlake

=== 2016 ===
- William Bell
- Hi Rhythm Section
- John Lee Hooker
- Charles Lloyd
- Marguerite Piazza
- Sam "The Sham" Samudio

=== 2017 ===
- Roy Orbison
- Memphis Horns
- Maurice White
- Frank Stokes
- Cassietta George
- Irvin Salky
- Jack Clement

=== 2018 ===
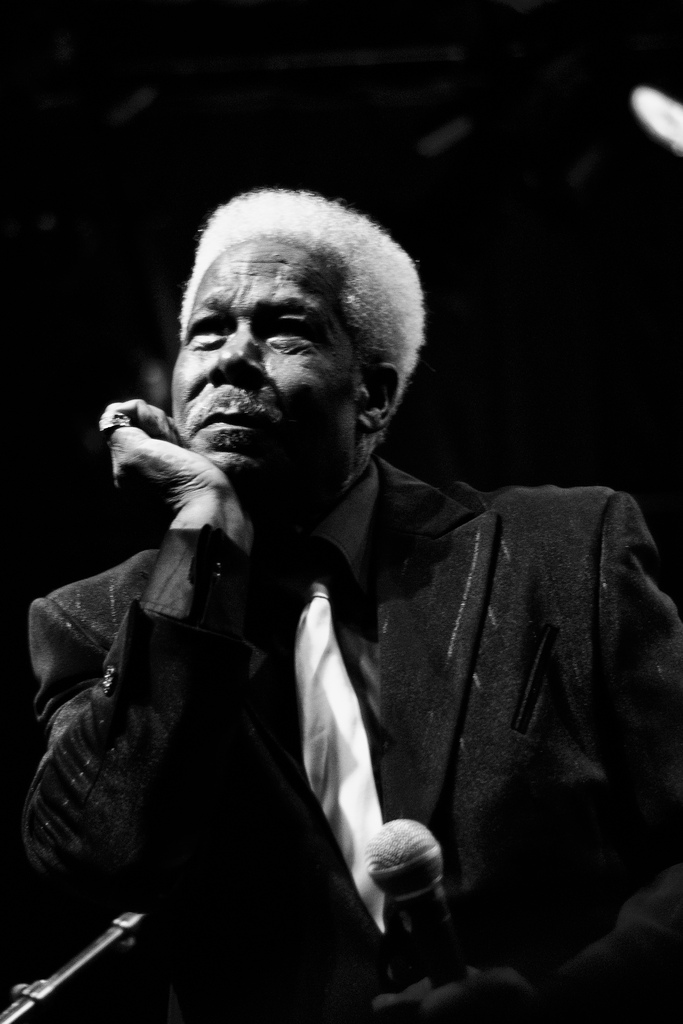
Eddie Floyd

- Aretha Franklin
- The Box Tops
- 8Ball & MJG
- The Rock and Roll Trio
- Eddie Floyd
- George Klein
- O'Landa Draper

=== 2019 ===
- Tina Turner
- Steve Cropper
- Charlie Musselwhite
- Dan Penn
- Don Bryant
- Dee Dee Bridgewater
- The Memphis Boys
- Florence Cole Talbert-McCleave

=== 2022 ===
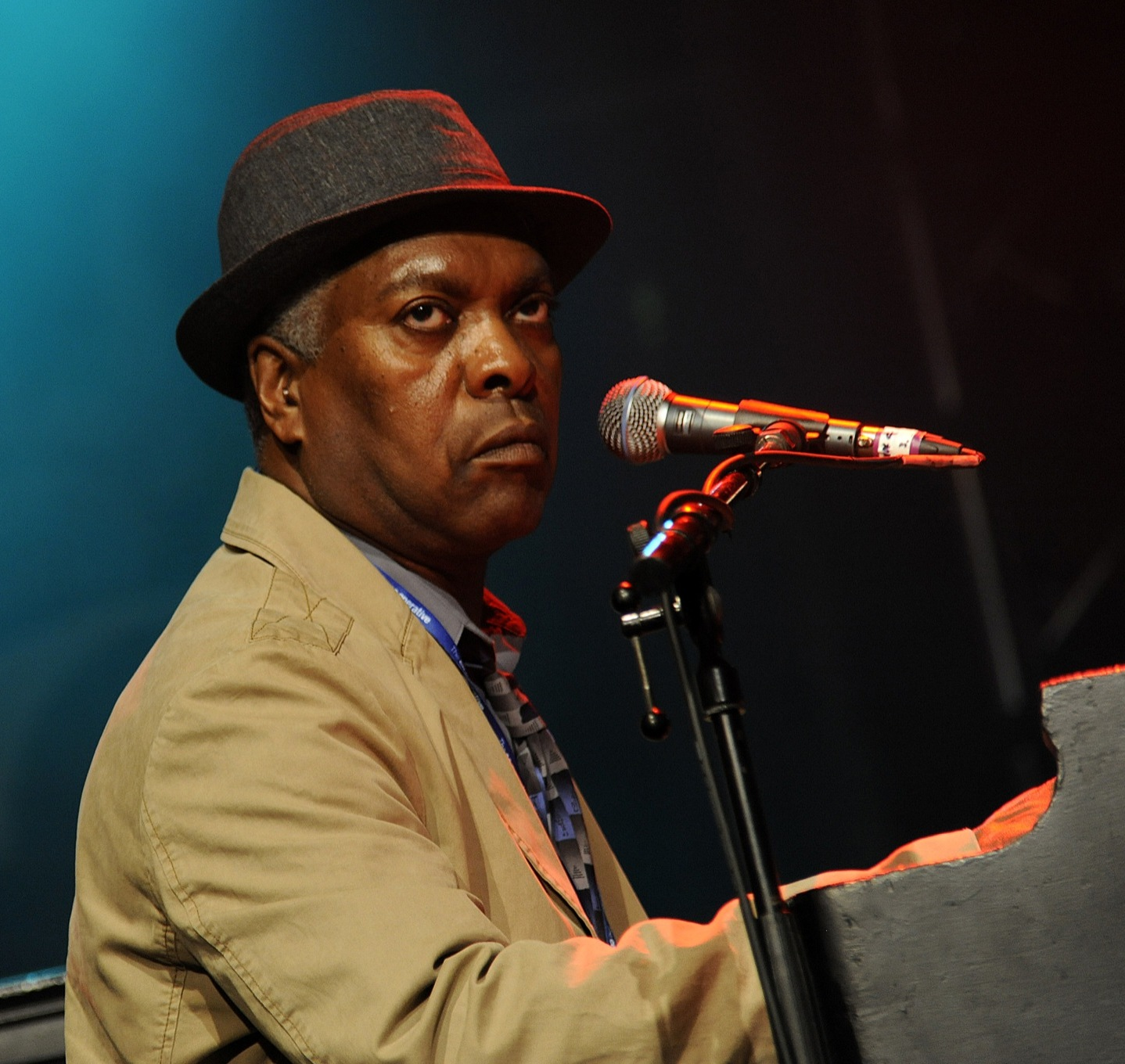
Booker T. Jones

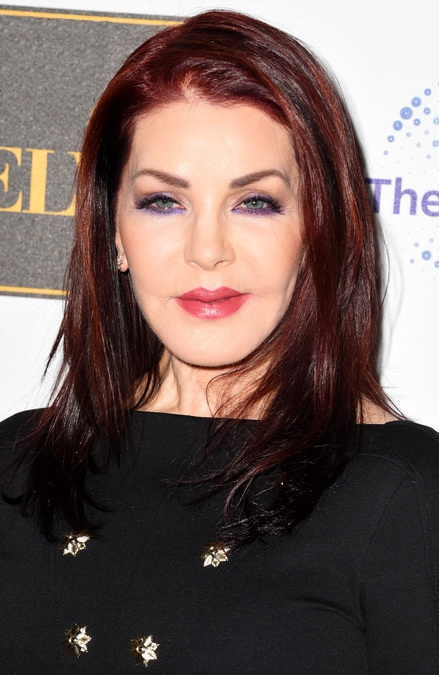
Priscilla Presley

- Fred Ford
- Jim Gaines
- Booker T. Jones
- Ronnie Milsap
- Priscilla Presley
- Billy Lee Riley
- Mavis Staples
- J.M. Van Eaton

=== 2023 ===
- Carlos "Six July" Broady
- Gus Cannon
- Jimi Jamison
- Don Nix
- Deanie Parker
- Kirk Whalum

=== 2024 ===
- James Carr
- Kallen Esperian
- The Gentrys
- Kevin Kane
- Spooner Oldham (inducted by Neil Young)
- Jazze Pha
- Wilson Pickett
- Rhodes, Chalmers, Rhodes
- Jack Soden

=== 2025 ===
- Art Gilliam
- Cordell Jackson
- Robert Johnson
- Denise LaSalle
- Wendy Moten
- Johnnie Taylor

== See also ==
- List of music museums
- Memphis Rock N' Soul Museum
