= Original Golden Hits, Vol. 2 =

Compilation album by Jerry Lee Lewis
- Released: 1969
- Recorded: Memphis
- Genre: Rock and roll, rockabilly, country
- Length: 27:20
- Label: Sun
- Producer: Shelby Singleton

Jerry Lee Lewis chronology
| Original Golden Hits, Vol. 1 (1969) | Original Golden Hits, Vol. 2 (1969) | Rockin' Rhythm and Blues (1969) |

Original Golden Hits, Vol. 2 is a compilation album by American rock and roll pioneer Jerry Lee Lewis, released on Sun Records in 1969. It is the direct sequel to Vol. 1 from earlier in the year, and compiled many of Lewis's popular Sun recordings. Following up on his recent successes on the country charts, Original Golden Hits, Vol. 2 peaked at number 6 on the Billboard country albums chart.

== Track listing ==
| No. | Title | Writer(s) | Length |
|---|---|---|---|
| 1. | "Fools like Me" | Jack Clement; Murphy Maddox | 2:53 |
| 2. | "Break-Up" | Charlie Rich | 2:37 |
| 3. | "Money" | Janie Bradford; Berry Gordy Jr. | 2:41 |
| 4. | "I'll Make It All Up to You" | | 3:03 |
| 5. | "Mean Woman Blues" | Claude Demetrius | 2:25 |
| 6. | "What'd I Say" | Ray Charles | 2:27 |
| 7. | "High School Confidential" | Ron Hargrave; Jerry Lee Lewis | 2:29 |
| 8. | "How's My Ex Treating You" | | 2:36 |
| 9. | "I'll Sail My Ship Alone" | Moon Mullican | 2:07 |
| 10. | "I Could Never Be Ashamed of You" | Hank Williams | 2:13 |
| 11. | "Save the Last Dance for Me" | Doc Pomus; Mort Shuman | 1:49 |
| Total length: | | | 27:20 |
