= J. W. Brown =

American musician (1926–2022)

- Born: November 28, 1926; Mangham, Louisiana; United States
- Died: October 10, 2022 (aged 95) Gwinnett County, Georgia; United States
- Genres: Rock and Roll, Rockabilly, Country
- Occupation: Musician
- Instrument: Bass guitar

J. W. Brown (November 28, 1926 – October 10, 2022) was an American musician, most known as a member of his cousin Jerry Lee Lewis's backing band, and as the father of Lewis's third wife Myra Gale Brown.

Brown was the first person to play an electric bass guitar on television.

== Early life ==
Born in Mangham, Louisiana and raised in Winnsboro, Louisiana, Brown was the third of four children of Henry and Jane (nee Lewis) Brown. As a child Brown learnt to play bass guitar and was a member of his family's band The Mississippi Hotshots, which regularly performed live on WMIS radio in Natchez, Mississippi.

During World War II, Brown was a member of a seismograph crew working in the oil fields of the Gulf of Mexico, before his attempts to enlist in the US military were denied, by the US Army due to his flat feet and the US Navy due to a heart murmur. Instead, Brown gained work as a linesman in Winnsboro.

Brown married Lois Clois Neal September 24, 1943 in Winnsboro; both were aged 16. They had two children; Myra Gale, in 1944 and Robby Jay (known as Rusty) in 1954.

== Musical career ==
Brown first met Jerry Lee Lewis when Lewis was a small child but did not see him again until 1955 when Brown traveled to Natchez to watch Lewis perform at a local club. Brown suggested they form a band but it was not until he was recovering from injury suffered while working as a telephone wire repairman in Memphis that he visited Lewis again and convinced him to start a band.

Lewis moved into Brown's house in Memphis, where he first met Brown's 12 year old daughter Myra Gale. Shortly after, Lewis was signed by Sun Records and following Lewis's debut single "Crazy Arms", Lewis and Brown were back at Sun Studios, recording the follow-up single, "It'll Be Me", when Brown suggested recording "Whole Lotta Shakin' Goin' On", a popular song in Lewis's live shows, as the B-side.

Following the release of "It'll Be Me"/"Whole Lotta Shakin' Goin' On", Lewis and his band were invited to perform "Whole Lotta Shakin' Goin' On" on the July 28, 1957 edition of the Steve Allen Show, where Brown became the first person to play an electric bass guitar (a Fender Precision) on television. Amid further touring, Brown appeared in the films Jamboree and High School Confidential.

Jerry Lee and Myra Gale (then 13) married in secret in Hernando, Mississippi on December 12, 1957. Upon learning of the marriage three days later, Brown grabbed his pistol and drove to Sun Studios with the intention of killing Lewis. Lois rang the studio and warned Sam Phillips, the owner of Sun Records, who bundled Lewis into a car and drove him to the airport, booking Lewis on the next flight to Alabama. Brown and Lewis next met on December 26, 1957 when they played a concert at the Paramount Theater in Brooklyn, New York when Lewis accidentally hit Brown in the head with a poorly thrown shoe while performing "Whole Lotta Shakin' Goin' On'".

Brown initially left Lewis's backing band in 1959 but occasionally returned for recording sessions and tours, with their final performance together taking place in May 2010 in Cherokee, North Carolina. Brown continued to perform live as a solo act, including opening for Bill Monroe and as a member of the house band for the Memphis Holiday Inns and the El Capitan Club.

In 1962, as Jay Brown, he recorded "So Long, I'm Gone", backed with "I'll Keep On Loving You" for Briar International, which earned a five star review from the Nashville Music Review, and in 1966 released "That's How Much", written and produced by Roland Janes, backed by "Don't Push Me Around", for Atco Records.

Outside of music, Brown owned a piano tuning and repair business before starting a trucking business with his son Rusty.

Brown was portrayed by John Doe in the 1989 movie Great Balls of Fire! and appeared on an 2017 episode of Mike Judge Presents: Tales From the Tour Bus.

In 2010, Brown released his autobiography Whole lotta Shakin', in which he wrote of his surprise at the number of famous musicians who were fans of his, including Kenny Rogers and Eric Clapton, and demand skyrocketed for Fender Precision bass guitars after his appearance on the Steve Allen Show.

Brown died in Gwinnett County, Georgia on October 10, 2022, aged 95. He and Lois had been married 78 years.

== Sources ==
- Bonomo, J. (2009) Jerry Lee Lewis: Lost and Found, Continuum: London. ISBN 9780826429667.
- Brown, J. W. (2010) Whole lotta Shakin', Continental Shelf Publishing: Savannah, Georgia. ISBN 9780982258361
- Davis, J.D. (2012) Unconquered, Brown Books Publishing Company: Dallas. ISBN 9781612540412.
- Guterman, J. (1991) Rockin' My Life Away: Listening to Jerry Lee Lewis, Rutledge Hill Press: Nashville. ISBN 1558530819.
- Lewis, M.G. & Silver, M. (1989) Great Balls of Fire, Mandarin: London. ISBN 0749301325.
- Tosches, N. (1982) Hellfire: The Jerry Lee Lewis Story, Plexus Publishing: London. ISBN 0859650529.
- White, C. (1995) Killer, Century: London. ISBN 9780712675291.
- Williams, M.G. (2016) The Spark That Survived, Deeds Publishing: Atlanta. ISBN 9781944193164.
