= Original Golden Hits, Vol. 1 =

Compilation album by Jerry Lee Lewis
- Released: 1969
- Recorded: Memphis
- Genres: Rock and roll, rockabilly, country
- Length: 25:53
- Label: Sun
- Producer: Shelby Singleton

Jerry Lee Lewis chronology
Together (1969)	Original Golden Hits, Vol. 1 (1969)	Original Golden Hits, Vol. 2 (1969)

Original Golden Hits, Vol. 1 is a compilation album by American rock and roll singer Jerry Lee Lewis, released on Sun Records in 1969.

== Background ==
When Shelby Singleton bought the Sun label from Sam Philips in July 1969, he began reissuing albums by former Sun stars Johnny Cash, Roy Orbison, Carl Perkins, Charlie Rich, and other lesser known artists. What turned out to be a goldmine for Singleton, however, were the gobs of recordings Lewis had left behind at Sun, most of which had never been released. With Lewis's return to the charts in 1968 with the country hit "Another Place, Another Time," and with Cash reaching the pinnacle of his stardom, Singleton wasted no time flooding the market with new compilations. Retaining the original Sun logo but also employing vague themes, overdubs, and contemporary photographs of the artists, Singleton mined the archive for obscure cuts and alternate takes to create packages that became extremely successful. Singleton also leased the masters to other labels, notably Charly in England and Rhino in the United States.

As the title implies, Original Golden Hits, Vol. 1 collects some of Lewis's biggest hits at Sun, including "Whole Lotta Shakin' Going On" and "Great Balls of Fire". The album became a top ten hit, peaking at number 8 on the Billboard country albums chart. As Lewis's phenomenal success continued in the country field, Singleton would tailor his Lewis releases to that market in 1970.

== Track listing ==
No.	Title	Writer(s)	Length
1.	"Crazy Arms"	Ralph Mooney; Charles Seals	2:42
2.	"End of the Road"	Jerry Lee Lewis	1:47
3.	"Great Balls of Fire"	Otis Blackwell; Jack Hammer	1:51
4.	"It'll Be Me"	Jack Clement	2:13
5.	"Move On Down the Line"	Roy Orbison; Sam Phillips	2:12
6.	"You Win Again"	Hank Williams	2:53
7.	"Whole Lotta Shakin' Goin' On"	Dave "Curlee" Williams; James Faye "Roy" Hall	2:51
8.	"Little Queenie"	Chuck Berry	2:23
9.	"Breathless"	Blackwell	2:41
10.	"Teen-Age Letter"		2:21
11.	"Lewis Boogie"	Lewis	1:59
Total length:			25:53
