= Red Hot (song) =

1955 song by Billy "The Kid" Emerson

Single by Billy "The Kid" Emerson
- B-side: "No Greater Love"
- Released: June 1955
- Recorded: May 31, 1955
- Studio: Sun Studio (Memphis, Tennessee)
- Genre: Rockabilly
- Length: 2:27
- Label: Sun
- Songwriter: Billy "The Kid" Emerson
- Producer: Sam Phillips

"Red Hot" is a song written and recorded by Billy "The Kid" Emerson and released on Sun Records in 1955. It has been covered many times.

== Emerson's version ==
Emerson recorded the song at the Sun Recording Studio in Memphis, Tennessee on May 31, 1955. Besides Emerson as vocalist, the Sam Phillips produced session included Calvin Newborn, guitar; Kenneth Banks, bass; Phineas Newborn, Sr., drums; Billy 'Red' Love, piano; Jewell Briscoe, tenor sax; and Moses Reed, tenor sax. The b-side for the release was another Emerson song, "No Greater Love".

== Covers ==
- The best known cover of "Red Hot," also recorded at Sun Studio, produced by Sam Phillips, and released on Sun Records was by Billy Lee Riley & The Little Green Men, in January 1957 and issued as # 277. Along with Riley on vocals and guitar were guitarist Roland Janes, drummer J. M. Van Eaton, bassist Marvin Pepper, and Jimmy Wilson on piano. The record did not chart.
- Another version was recorded in 1957, at Mira Smith's Ram Studios, Shreveport, Louisiana by Bob Luman (Imperial XB8313, 1957) featuring James Burton on guitar.
- Ronnie Hawkins released a version of the song on his first album, Ronnie Hawkins, on Roulette Records, # SR-25078 in 1959. The drummer on the session was future member of The Band, Levon Helm, then a member of Hawkins' backing band, The Hawks.
- The Beatles performed "Red Hot" in December 1962, live at the Star-Club in Hamburg, but the recording has never been officially released.
- Robert Gordon with Link Wray on guitar, released a version on his debut album for Private Stock Records, # PS-2030 in 1977.
- The song was performed by Joss Ackland (as Evil Edmunds and The BeeLzeeBOPS) in the 2003 movie, I'll Be There.
- Brian Setzer released a version of the song on his 2005 album Rockabilly Riot, Vol. 1 - A Tribute to Sun Records.
