= William Martin Willis =

American rock and roll musician

William Martin "Marty" Willis
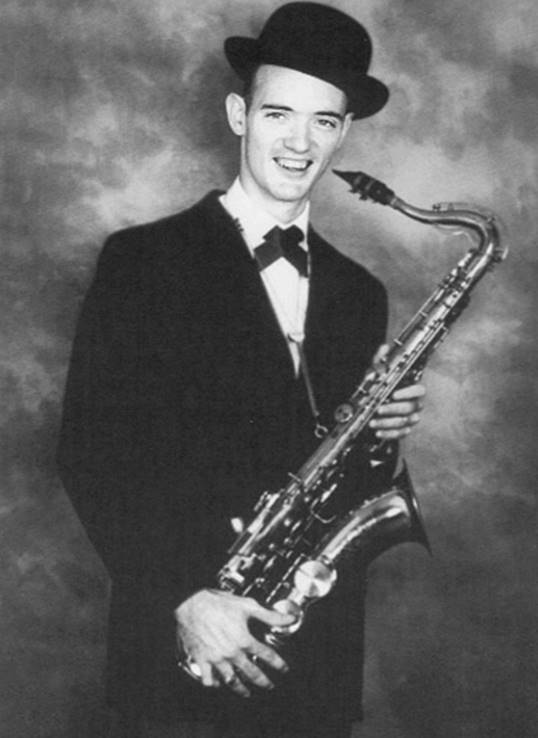
- Marty Willis studio promo shot with saxophone and trademark derby

Background information
- Also known as: Willy; Marty
- Born: William Martin Willis, Jr. February 27, 1938; Memphis, Tennessee
- Died: February 13, 2018 (aged 79) Brandon, Florida
- Genres: Rock and roll; Jazz; Country; Blues
- Occupations: Musician, composer, arranger
- Instruments: Saxophones; Clarinet; Flute
- Years active: 1956–1966
- Labels: Sun, Phillips, Mercury, Hi

William Martin Willis Jr. (February 27, 1938 – February 13, 2018) was an American rockabilly rock and roll musician, composer, and arranger who played the saxophone, clarinet, and flute as a member of several bands in the 1950s and 1960s. Throughout his career, Willis traveled and recorded with several musicians, including Conway Twitty, Charlie Rich, Roy Orbison, Jerry Lee Lewis, Billy Lee Riley, Eddie Cash, Johnny Bernero, Narvel Felts, Roland Janes, Barbara Pittman, and the Bill Black Combo. He was an original Sun Studio session musician and is a member of the Rockabilly Hall of Fame.

== Biography ==
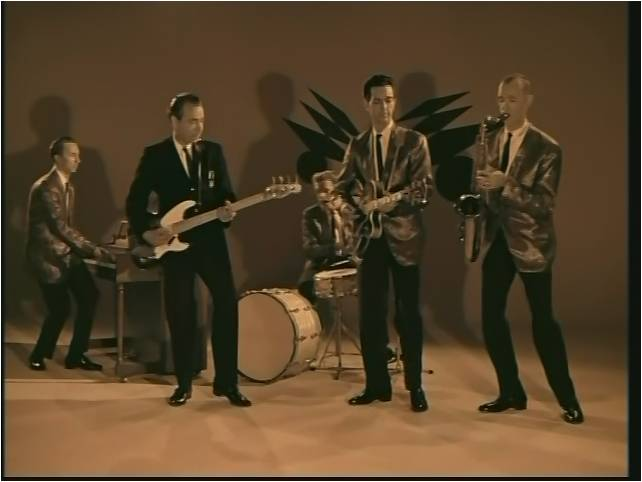
Teenage Millionaire- Bill Black Combo "Yogi"

Willis was born on February 27, 1938, in Memphis, Tennessee. In 1956 Willis began his recording and performing career with Conway Twitty and his band "The Rockhousers," who had record contracts with Mercury Records Nashville and MGM Records. Willis performed many songs with Conway Twitty, including "Shake It Up" and "I Need Your Loving". The latter was also Twitty's first record to hit the Billboard charts, peaking at #93. In 1957, during a tour stop in Toronto, Canada at The Brass Rail, Willis left Conway Twitty's band and joined Sun Records artist Billy Lee Riley's band, "The Little Green Men." As a Sun Studio musician, Willis used his experience with rock-and-roll, jazz, blues, and country music, in addition to his abilities to quickly transpose music and play guitar keys with his saxophones, to add to the emerging "Rockabilly"-sound. An example of his transposition is when he played a regular C-note as an A-note on the Alto/Baritone saxophone with an A♯-note for the tenor, while the piano and guitars played their original notes and chord progression as written. He collaborated with several other Sun musicians in their songs, including with Jerry Lee Lewis in "I'll Sail My Ship Alone" and "Hang Up My Rock And Roll Shoes," with Roy Orbison in “I Like Love” and "The Fools' Hall of Fame," and with Charlie Rich in "Lonely Weekends." Willis also recorded and went on tour with Charlie Rich's band.

In 1959 Willis joined Bill Black, the original bassist for Elvis Presley, in a new band called Bill Black's Combo. His saxophone work with the band in "Smokie Part 2", "Josephine", and "White Silver Sands" was rated as the greatest saxophone solo work in 1959, 1960, and 1961, respectively. Bill Black's Combo earned a Gold Record for "White Silver Sands" and was listed as Billboard's Most Played Instrumental Group from 1959 to 1962. The group played its songs "Smokie, Part 2" and “Yogi” in the movie Teenage Millionaire, which also starred Chubby Checker, Dion DiMucci, and Jackie Wilson. In 1963 Willis began letting bandmate Ace Cannon replace him as the band's saxophonist when the band went on tours. Willis subsequently formed his own band, “The Marty Willis Combo”, which signed to Bill Black's Rita and Louis record labels. Occasionally musicians visiting Memphis would sit in during the band's sessions to perform, including Pete Fountain and Al Hirt.

After the birth of his son in 1965, Willis wanted to settle down to family life and take a break from traveling and performing. One of his fans from his supper club performing days, Kemmons Wilson, gave him a job managing a club. Willis was subsequently promoted, becoming the food and beverage manager at the Peabody Hotel. In 1968, he was chosen to manage new hotels being built in Daytona Beach, Florida. For the next thirty-five years, Willis became a well-sought businessman and recognized official in the hotel management industry. In 1978 he became a widower at the age of 40 when his wife died. After the death of one of his daughters in 2001, Willis retired in 2005 to Valrico, Florida, making his last performance the next year with Billy Lee Riley and "The Little Green Men" at the Memphis in May music festival. Two years after the death of his second daughter in 2010, Willis began suffering from dementia and Alzheimer's disease. On February 13, 2018, Willis died following complications from a fall and broken hip. He was buried with his wife and daughters in the Masonic section of the Hillsboro Memorial Gardens cemetery in Brandon, Florida.

== See also ==
- List of rockabilly musicians
