= Jerry Lee's Greatest! =

Studio album by Jerry Lee Lewis
- Released: December 1961
- Genre: Rock and roll
- Length: 14:48 (Side A); 13:39 (Side B); 28:27 (Total)
- Label: Sun
- Producer: Sam Phillips

Jerry Lee Lewis chronology
Jerry Lee Lewis (1958)	Jerry Lee's Greatest! (1961)	Golden Hits of Jerry Lee Lewis (1964)

Singles from Jerry Lee's Greatest!
- 1. "Great Balls of Fire" Released: November, 1957; 2. "Break-Up"" Released: August 1958; 3. "Let's Talk About Us" Released: June 1959; 4. "What'd I Say" Released: February 1961; 5. "Cold, Cold Heart" Released: May 1961; 6. "Money (That's What I Want)" Released: November 1961

Jerry Lee's Greatest! is the second studio album by American musician Jerry Lee Lewis, released in 1961 on Sun Records (SLP 1265).

== Background ==
Although Lewis recorded with Sun Records from 1956 to 1963 - far longer than Elvis Presley or Johnny Cash - only two LPs were ever issued on Sun under Jerry Lee's name, the second being Jerry Lee's Greatest in 1961. Part of the reason for the lack of material was no doubt producer Sam Phillips' waning enthusiasm in the wake of Lewis' scandalous marriage to his 13-year-old cousin Myra, which erupted on a tour of Britain in 1958, derailing the star's career. In his authorized 2014 biography Jerry Lee Lewis: His Own Story, Rick Bragg quotes Phillips as he explained his reasoning to Sun researcher Martin Hawkins: "I was always very cautious about putting out a lot of product on my artists just to ensure a certain amount of income...You only have to look at some of the crap they put out on Elvis Presley, just because he was in a picture show or something...When Jerry Lee took a beating from the press it would have been stupid to try and cram product down people's throats. Believe me, just before that happened, Jerry was the hottest thing in America." Jerry Lee's Greatest! includes mostly later cuts from Lewis's run at Sun, with AllMusic's Cub Koda suggesting that, "While tracks like "Let's Talk About Us," "What'd I Say," and "As Long as I Live" have their own charm, this set simply isn't the place to start a Jerry Lee collection..." The album includes Lewis' biggest hit, "Great Balls of Fire," which had been left off of his debut LP.

== Track listing ==
Side A

No.	Title	Writer(s)	Length
1.	"Money"	Janie Bradford; Berry Gordy, Jr.	2:30
2.	"As Long As I Live"	Dorsey Burnette	2:25
3.	"Hillbilly Fever"	George Vaughn	2:05^{†}
4.	"Frankie and Johnny"	Traditional; arranged by Jerry Lee Lewis	2:30
5.	"Home"	Roger Miller	1:58
6.	"Hello, Hello Baby"	Traditional; arranged by Jerry Lee Lewis	3:20
Total length:			14:48

Side B

No.	Title	Writer(s)	Length
7.	"Let's Talk About Us"	Otis Blackwell	2:05
8.	"What'd I Say"	Ray Charles	2:25
9.	"Break Up"	Charlie Rich	2:36
10.	"Great Balls of Fire"	Otis Blackwell; Jack Hammer	1:50
11.	"Cold, Cold Heart"	Hank Williams	3:02
12.	"Hello Josephine"	Fats Domino; Dave Bartholomew	1:41
Total length:			13:39

^{†} Mislabeled as "Country Music is Here to Stay" (Ferlin Husky) on the original LP.
