= Great Balls of Fire! (film) =

1989 film by Jim McBride

- Theatrical release poster
- Directed by: Jim McBride
- Screenplay by: Jack Baran; Jim McBride
- Based on: Great Balls of Fire: The Uncensored Story of Jerry Lee Lewis by Myra Gale Brown and Murray M. Silver Jr.
- Produced by: Adam Fields
- Starring: Dennis Quaid; Winona Ryder; Alec Baldwin; Trey Wilson
- Cinematography: Affonso Beato
- Edited by: Lisa Day; Pembroke J. Herring; Bert Lovitt
- Music by: Jerry Lee Lewis
- Distributed by: Orion Pictures
- Release date: June 30, 1989 (United States)
- Running time: 108 minutes
- Language: English
- Budget: $16-18 million
- Box office: $13.7 million

Great Balls of Fire! is a 1989 American biographical drama film directed by Jim McBride and starring Dennis Quaid as rockabilly pioneer Jerry Lee Lewis. Based on a biography by Myra Lewis and Murray M. Silver Jr., the screenplay is written by McBride and Jack Baran. The film is produced by Adam Fields, with executive producers credited as Michael Grais, Mark Victor, and Art Levinson.

The film depicts the early career of Lewis, from his rise to rock-and-roll stardom to his controversial marriage to his 13-year-old cousin that led to his downfall.

== Plot ==
Jerry Lee Lewis (Dennis Quaid) plays piano, as opposed to a guitar like most other rock artists, during rock and roll's early years from 1956 to 1958. Jerry Lee is a man with many different sides: a skilled performer with little discipline, and an alcoholic.

As Jerry Lee rises to the top of the charts with hits such as "Crazy Arms", "Whole Lotta Shakin' Goin' On", and "Great Balls of Fire", he falls in love with Myra Gale Brown (Winona Ryder), the 12-year-old daughter of his first cousin and bass player J. W. Brown (John Doe), and eventually marries her (eloping to Mississippi), much to the anger and chagrin of her parents.

Jerry Lee's other relationship is that with double first cousin and televangelist Jimmy Swaggart (Alec Baldwin) who is a struggling Pentecostal preacher. Jimmy's career keeps him in constant conflict with his cousin's wild rock and roll career and brings out some uncomfortable exchanges between the two. The now-financially successful Jerry Lee buys a new car and gives it to his cousin, and when Jimmy praises the Lord for the gift, Jerry Lee replies, "Don't thank Jesus, thank Jerry Lee Lewis!"

While Jerry Lee is touring in England, a reporter discovers he is married to the underage Myra Gale. Jerry Lee is then condemned as a child molester and a pervert by the public before being ridiculed off stage at his opening concert; as a result, the tour is cancelled and Jerry Lee is deported. Confident that his career will remain a success, Jerry Lee is undaunted; however, the scandal follows him back to the States.

Jerry Lee then begins drinking heavily when record sales and concert attendances are significantly down. Jerry Lee becomes even more angry when requested to print a public apology in Billboard and becomes increasingly abusive toward Myra. It is during one of these episodes that Myra informs Jerry Lee that she is pregnant, and he collapses into Myra's arms, crying hysterically.

In a last-ditch effort to improve his life, Jerry Lee, with Myra in tow, attends one of Swaggart's church services. During the altar call, Jimmy offers Jerry Lee one more chance to become saved and get right with God, but Jerry Lee again refuses, declaring, "If I'm going to hell, I'm going there playing the piano!" The caption preceding the closing credits reads, "Jerry Lee Lewis is playing his heart out somewhere in America tonight."

== Cast ==
- Dennis Quaid as Jerry Lee Lewis
- Winona Ryder as Myra Gale Brown
- John Doe as J. W. Brown
- Stephen Tobolowsky as Jud Phillips
- Trey Wilson as Sam Phillips
- Alec Baldwin as Jimmy Swaggart
- Steve Allen as Himself
- Lisa Blount as Lois Brown
- Joshua Sheffield as Rusty Brown
- Mojo Nixon as James Van Eaton
- Jimmie Vaughan as Roland Janes
- David R. Ferguson as Jack Clement
- Robert Lesser as Alan Freed
- Michael St. Gerard as Elvis Presley
- Lisa Jane Persky as Babe
- Peter Cook as British reporter
- Jerry Lee Lewis (credited as "The Killer Himself") performed vocals and piano

== Production ==
The story was co-written by Myra Gale Lewis (her autobiography Great Balls of Fire!), the former wife of Jerry Lee Lewis, with Murray Silver. Despite this, co-writer Silver was upset by the lack of accuracy in the film, claiming it was "phoney". Myra claimed producers broke their agreement to consult her for the script and casting.

Director Jim McBride admitted that it was never his intention to tie his film to the facts, and stated, "This movie does not represent itself in any way to be a historical documentary. We use the book as a jumping-off point."

Lewis openly stated that he hated the film and the book it was based on. He did, however, praise Quaid's portrayal of him in the film, saying "he really pulled it off". Quaid even learned to play "Lewis-style" piano for the role.

This was the final film of character actor Trey Wilson. He died at age 40 from a cerebral hemorrhage in January 1989, prior to the film's release.

=== Filming locations ===
The film was shot on location in Marion, Arkansas; Memphis, Tennessee, and West Memphis, Arkansas. After filming for 10 weeks in Memphis, the film had two weeks of completion filming in London.

== Reception ==
=== Critical response ===
Great Balls of Fire! earned mixed to positive reviews. The review aggregator Rotten Tomatoes reported that 63% of critics gave the film a positive review, based on 27 reviews, with an average rating of 5.9/10. The critical consensus reads, "Great Balls of Fire romanticizes the more disturbing elements of Jerry Lee Lewis' controversial life story, but Dennis Quaid's crackerjack performance and a soundtrack stuffed with classic songs gives this flawed biopic some smolder". On Metacritic—which assigns a weighted mean score—the film has a score of 49 out of 100 based on 20 critics, indicating "mixed or average" reviews. Audiences polled by CinemaScore gave the film an average grade of "B+" on an A+ to F scale.

Roger Ebert of the Chicago Sun-Times, gave the film two stars out of four. He wrote that Quaid did a fine job of reproducing Lewis' stage persona, but lamented how "the script shies away from the dark side of Lewis." He thought it presented "a Jerry Lee Lewis who has been sanitized, popularized and lobotomized." Regarding the portrayal of Lewis' third marriage, the film "plays everything so obliquely that we have little idea of what the girl thinks of Lewis, and no idea of what he thinks of her."

Caryn James of The New York Times wrote that the film portrays the fun side of rock and roll, writing "Jim McBride's film is a compressed, cleaned-up version of the Jerry Lee Lewis story, but it re-creates the soul-shaking, brain-rattling fun of rock-and-roll. It also captures, perhaps for the first time on film, something of the sexual aura of rock-and-roll at its birth." Yet, she added that anyone looking for a true sense of music history will be let down by the film. Jay Carr of The Boston Globe thought McBride was "justified in trying to make a film about the way we mythify our public icons", and thought Ryder made the film "special". Yet he wrote that it "never connects with anything that might be called a real feeling, never takes things beyond the merely skin-deep", describing it as "bland, bloated, mainstream, false".

=== Accolades ===
- Young Artist Awards: Young Artist Award; Best Young Actress Starring in a Motion Picture, Winona Ryder; 1990.

=== Box office ===
The film opened on 1,417 screens in the United States on June 30, 1989. The box-office receipts were poor, with the film finishing in seventh place for the weekend with a gross of $3,807,986 and eventually grossing $13,691,550.

== Soundtrack ==
Great Balls of Fire! Original Motion Picture Soundtrack

Soundtrack album by Jerry Lee Lewis
- Released: June 8, 1989
- Recorded: 1988
- Genres: Rockabilly; rock and roll
- Length: 34:58
- Label: Polydor
- Producers: T Bone Burnett; Jerry Lee Lewis

An original motion picture soundtrack was released by the producers on the Polydor Records label on June 8, 1989. Lewis re-recorded his music from the 1950s for the soundtrack with the title track "Great Balls of Fire", "Whole Lotta Shakin' Goin' On" and "That Lucky Old Sun". The soundtrack contains 12 tracks. A music video of the song "Great Balls of Fire", with Quaid and Lewis playing the piano and containing snippets of scenes from the film, was featured on the original VHS video release preceding the film. This re-recorded version was also featured in the 1993 film adaptation of the Stephen King novel Needful Things, when the character Hugh Priest (Duncan Fraser) is reminiscing about his youth as a teenager in the 1950s after trying on a jacket that looks like the one he had when he was younger. "Lewis Boogie" is also in the film during the closing credits but does not appear on the soundtrack album.

CD track listing

1. "Great Balls of Fire"
2. "High School Confidential"
3. "Big Legged Woman" – Booker T. Laury
4. "I'm on Fire"
5. "Rocket 88" – Jackie Brenston and the Delta Cats
6. "Whole Lotta Shakin' Goin' On"
7. "Whole Lotta Shakin' Goin' On" – Valerie Wellington
8. "Breathless"
9. "Crazy Arms" – Jerry Lee Lewis/Dennis Quaid
10. "Wild One"
11. "That Lucky Old Sun"
12. "Great Balls of Fire" (original version)

=== Singles ===
The title track "Great Balls of Fire" was released as a single on 7" vinyl and CD format with either 2 or 3-tracks in various countries such as the US, UK, Netherlands, Japan and Germany with the B-side being "Breathless" or "Crazy Arms".

== Home media ==
Despite the poor box office performance, the US video release of Great Balls of Fire! in 1989 generated income of $11 million. It was released to DVD by MGM Home Entertainment on April 1, 2003 as a Region 1 widescreen DVD. The film was issued on Blu-ray by Olive Films on February 27, 2018.
