= Hot Damn =

Hot Damn or Hot Damn! may refer to:

== Music ==
- "Hot Damn" (song), a 2003 single by Clipse from The Neptunes' compilation album The Neptunes Present... Clones
- The Hot Damn!, a rock band

=== Albums ===
- Hot Damn! (Billy Lee Riley album), 1997
- Hot Damn! (Every Time I Die album), 2003
- Hot Damn! (Mojo Gurus album), 2006
- Hot Damn!, 2007 album by Haggis Horns, horn section backing Corinne Bailey Rae

== Other ==
- Hot Damn, a book of essays by James W. Hall
- Hot Damn!, a hot cinnamon schnapps liqueur made by DeKuyper
