= Billy Lee Riley =

American singer-songwriter (1933–2009)

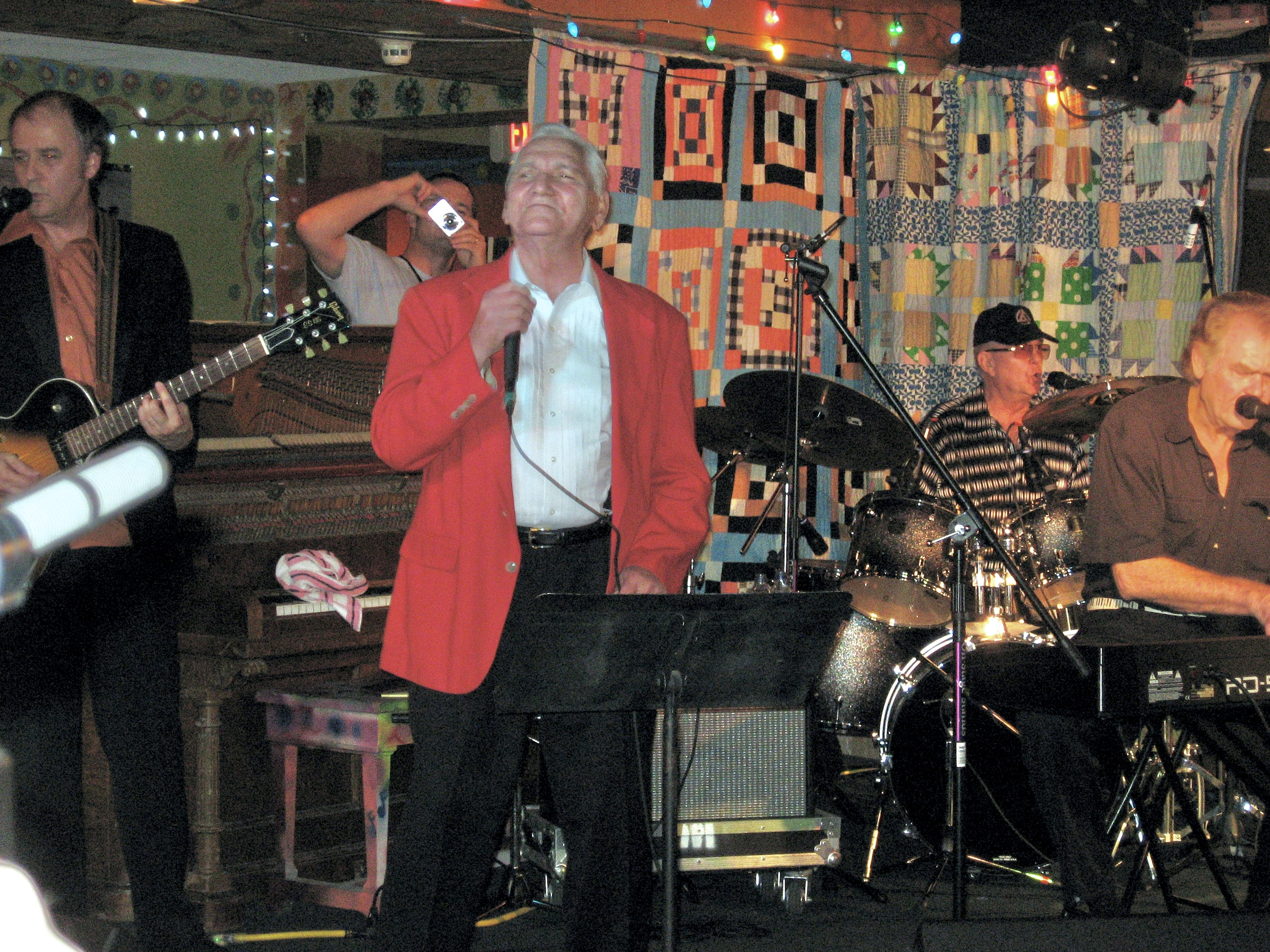
- Riley at the Memphis Music Festival, 2008

Background information
- Born: October 5, 1933
- Origin: Pocahontas, Arkansas, U.S.
- Died: August 2, 2009 (aged 75) Jonesboro, Arkansas, U.S.
- Genres: Rockabilly; blues; rock and roll
- Occupations: Musician; singer; record producer; songwriter
- Instruments: Guitar; harmonica
- Labels: Sun; Rita

Billy Lee Riley (October 5, 1933 – August 2, 2009) was an American musician, singer-songwriter, and record producer. His most memorable recordings include "Rock With Me Baby", "Flyin' Saucers Rock and Roll" (Note: Variously spelled as "...Rock & Roll" or "...Rock 'n' Roll" in different sources.) and "Red Hot".

== Biography ==
Riley was born in Pocahontas, Arkansas, the son of a sharecropper. He learned to play the guitar from black farm workers. After four years in the Army, he first recorded in Memphis, Tennessee, in 1955, before being persuaded by Sam Phillips to record for Sun Studios. He then recorded "Trouble Bound", produced by Jack Clement and Slim Wallace. Phillips obtained the rights and released "Trouble Bound" backed with "Rock with Me Baby" on September 1, 1956 (Sun 245). Riley's first hit was "Flyin' Saucers Rock and Roll", backed with "I Want You Baby", released February 23, 1957 (Sun 260), with backing piano by Jerry Lee Lewis. Riley then recorded "Red Hot", backed with "Pearly Lee", released September 30, 1957 (Sun 277).

"Red Hot" was showing promise as a hit record, but Phillips stopped promoting it so as to promote "Great Balls of Fire", by Jerry Lee Lewis. Riley felt that his chances of chart success were compromised when Phillips diverted resources to Lewis's career. He had made other recordings for Sun, and they likewise did not have a lot of sales, as Phillips did not promote them. Like other artists, such as Sonny Burgess, Hayden Thompson, Ray Harris, and Warren Smith, chart success largely eluded him.

Considered good looking and with wild stage moves, Riley had a brief solo career with his backing band, the Little Green Men. Riley and his Little Green Men were the main Sun studio band. The band consisted of Riley, the guitarist Roland Janes, the drummer Jimmy Van Eaton, the bassist Marvin Monroe Peppers, and Jimmy Wilson, later joined by Martin Willis.

In 1960, Riley left Sun and started Rita Records with Roland Janes. They produced the national hit "Mountain of Love", by Harold Dorman. Years later he played the memorable harmonica solo in Johnny Rivers' version of the same song.

Riley later started two other labels, Nita and Mojo.

In 1962, he moved to Los Angeles and worked as a session musician with Dean Martin, the Beach Boys, Herb Alpert, and Sammy Davis Jr., among others, and also recorded under various aliases.

Riley appeared in a Scopitone performing the song “High Heel Sneakers”, filmed live at the Whiskey a Go Go, in Hollywood, in 1965. That same year Mercury Records released the LP Whiskey a Go Go Presents Billy Lee Riley, recorded live at the Whiskey a Go Go.

In the early 1970s, Riley quit music to return to Arkansas and started his own construction business. In 1978 "Red Hot" and "Flyin' Saucers Rock and Roll" were covered by Robert Gordon and Link Wray, which led to a one-off performance in Memphis in 1979, the success of which led to further recording at Sun Studio and a full-time return to performing.

Riley was rediscovered in 1992 by Bob Dylan, who had been a fan since 1956.

His album Hot Damn! (Capricorn, 1997) was nominated for a Grammy Award. In 2001 he joined St. Louis rockabilly band The CrazyBeats as an honorary member and performed with them everytime he came to St. Louis.

He was injured falling on a slippery department store floor in 2005, requiring two surgeries as a result. In 2006, he released a country CD, Hillbilly Rockin' Man.

The Rockabilly Hall of Fame reported in summer 2009 that Riley was in poor health, with stage four bone cancer. His last public performance was in June 2009 at the New Daisy Theatre on Beale Street in Memphis, when he took part in Petefest 2009, honoring the historian Pete Daniel, who had befriended Riley while helping launch the Memphis Rock 'n' Soul Museum. Supported by a walker, Riley rocked out on "Red Hot" and other old hits. He died of bone cancer on August 2, 2009, in Jonesboro, Arkansas.

In 2015, Bob Dylan offered this tribute to Riley, thanking MusiCares for their support in Riley's last years:

He was a true original. He did it all: He played, he sang, he wrote. He would have been a bigger star but Jerry Lee came along. And you know what happens when someone like that comes along. You just don't stand a chance. So Billy became what is known in the industry—a condescending term—as a one-hit wonder. But sometimes, just sometimes, once in a while, a one-hit wonder can make a more powerful impact than a recording star who's got 20 or 30 hits behind him. And Billy's hit song was called "Red Hot," and it was red hot. It could blast you out of your skull and make you feel happy about it. Change your life.

== Selected albums ==
=== Studio albums ===
- Harmonica & the Blues, Crown, 1962
- Big Harmonica Special, Mercury, 1964
- Harmonica Beatlemania, Mercury, 1965
- Whiskey a Go Go Presents, Mercury, 1965
- Funk Harmonica, GNP, 1966
- In Action, GNP, 1966
- Southern Soul, Mojo, 1968; reissued, Cowboy Carl, 1981
- Vintage, Mojo, 1978
- 706 Reunion, Sun-Up, 1992
- Blue Collar Blues, Hightone, 1992
- Rockin' Fifties, Icehouse, 1995
- Hot Damn!, Capricorn, 1997
- Shade Tree Blues, Icehouse, 1999
- One More Time, Sun-Up, 2002
- Hillbilly Rockin' Man, Reba Records, 2003
- Still Got My Mojo, 2009

=== Compilation albums ===
- The Legendary Sun Performers: Billy Lee Riley, Charly, 1977
- Sun Sound Special: Billy Lee Riley, Charly, 1978
- Classic Recordings 1959–1960, Bear Family, 1994
- Very Best of Billy Lee Riley: Red Hot, Collectables, 1998

== Sources ==
- DeRemer, L., ed. (2004). Billy Lee Riley. Contemporary Musicians. Vol. 43. Thomson Gale. eNotes.com, 2006.
- Escott, C.; Hawkins, M. (1975). Catalyst: The Sun Records Story. London.
- Evans, P.; Futterman, S.; et al. (1995). “The New Rolling Stone Encyclopedia of Rock & Roll”. New York: Fireside. p. 835. ISBN 0-684-81044-1.
- Gray, M. (2006). The Bob Dylan Encyclopedia. New York and London. pp. 575–576.
- Hardy, Phil; Laing, Dave (1977). Encyclopedia of Rock 1955–1975. London. p. 78.
- Pareles, J.; Romanowski, P. (1983). The Rolling Stone Encyclopaedia of Rock & Roll. New York: Summit Books. p 470. ISBN 0-671-43457-8.
- Weigel, Andreas. Billy Lee Riley "Trouble Bound" Portrait.
- LexGo

== Discography ==
- Complete Discography (WDD) (Original URL no longer active, this is the last good Wayback Machine link.)
- Revised WDD Discography (Unlike the original (above), the new WDD lacks label images at this time (September 2022).)
- Another complete Discography.
