= Live at the Star Club =

Live at the Star Club may refer to:

- Live at the Star Club, Hamburg, a 1964 album by Jerry Lee Lewis
- Live! at the Star-Club in Hamburg, Germany; 1962, a 1977 album by the Beatles
