= Allen Page =

American rock and roll and gospel musician

Allen Lamar Wingate
- Also known as: Allen Page
- Born: August 14, 1936; Tampa, Florida, US
- Died: April 26, 1993 (aged 56) New Smyrna Beach, Florida, US
- Genres: Rockabilly, rock and roll
- Instrument: Vocals
- Years active: 1957-1960 (rock and roll); 1964 - 1978 (gospel)
- Label: Moon Records

Allen Page (born Allen Lamar Wingate, August 14, 1936, – April 26, 1993) was an American rockabilly and rock and roll musician who recorded for independent labels in Memphis, Tennessee from 1957 to 1960, and subsequently as a gospel recording artist and evangelist. Recording under the stage name Allen Page, he released singles on Moon Records and is described as the label's most prolific recording artist. Prior to his Moon recordings, Wingate auditioned at Sun Records; three tracks from that session were later issued on a Bear Family Records compilation. His recording "Dateless Night" has been covered by multiple artists across rock, punk, and psychobilly genres.

== Biography ==
Allen Lamar Wingate was born on August 14, 1936, in Tampa, Florida. In 1956, he relocated to Memphis, Tennessee, where he auditioned at Sun Studio for Sam Phillips but did not secure a recording contract. He subsequently came to the attention of Cordell Jackson, founder of the independent Memphis imprint Moon Records. Jackson is recognized as the first woman to produce, engineer, arrange, and release music on her own rock and roll label.

=== Recordings ===
Three tracks from Wingate's Sun audition session — recorded under his birth name — were later issued on the Bear Family Records compilation.

As Allen Page, Wingate released four singles on Moon Records. His debut, "Honeysuckle" b/w "High School Sweater" was co-written with his wife JoAnn; "High School Sweater" was subsequently covered by Arkansas singer Kenny Owens. His second single, "Dateless Night" b/w "I Wish You Were Wishing", credited to Allen Page with The Deltones, featured a Cordell Jackson composition recorded under her pseudonym Cordell Miller. A third single, "She's the One That's Got It," was written by Wingate for his wife. His final Moon release, "Oh! Baby" b/w "I Wish You Were Wishing", also featured a Cordell Jackson composition and was recorded with the Big Four, a group that had recorded in its own right for Moon Records; it was also Moon Records' final release. The single received a pop review in Billboard on June 13, 1960. Two songs co-written by Wingate and his wife, "Stairway to Nowhere" and "Raining the Blues," were recorded by Ernie Barton in March 1958 for Phillips International Records.

In 1965, Wingate recorded a four-track gospel EP and an accompanying LP on a private label with a matrix series 13799/800 and pressed by Rite Records, credited to "Evangelist Allen Wingate." The EP included "It's Different Now," "I'm Counting On Jesus," a version of Hank Williams' "I Saw the Light," and "At Calvary." Further gospel recordings followed throughout the 1970s, some featuring his wife JoAnn and son James, including the album Beyond the Sunset, the title song of which can be heard here

=== Later life ===
In August 1963, Wingate experienced a religious conversion and subsequently left the music business to pursue full-time ministry. From 1963 onward he traveled the United States, Canada, Mexico, and Panama as an itinerant evangelist, accompanied at times by Florida musicians Billy and Tommy Brown. He later served as pastor of a congregation in Valdosta, Georgia, while the family resided in Sharonville, Ohio. In 1972 he relocated to Huntsville, Alabama. In the fall of 1975, Wingate settled his family in New Smyrna Beach, Florida, where he founded and served as pastor of the New Smyrna Beach Church of God until his death, leading the congregation over 18 years. He died on April 26, 1993, aged 56, and was buried at Sea Pines Memorial Gardens in Edgewater, Florida.

== Legacy ==
"Dateless Night" has been covered by a number of notable artists across multiple genres. Alex Chilton recorded a version titled "Stranded on a Dateless Night," appearing on his live album Live in London and the 1998 Peabody Records CD reissue of Like Flies on Sherbert. Tav Falco's Panther Burns recorded the song for their 1987 album The World We Knew. The Nomads included a version on their 1994 album Showdown!. British psychobilly band The Meteors released "Dateless Nites" as the B-side of their 1987 Anagram Records single "Don't Touch the Bang Bang Fruit," later compiled on the label's Anagram Singles Collection with Cherry Red Records. The song has additionally been covered by The Quakes, The Spanks, and Ross Johnson and Jeffrey Evans.

One of Wingate's rockabilly recordings was also covered by Brian Setzer of the Stray Cats, as referenced in contemporary family documentation. "She's the One That's Got It" appeared on a 1981 Moon Records compilation entitled :The 50's Rock on the Moon of Memphis, Tennessee".
