= Live at the Star Club, Hamburg =

Live album by Jerry Lee Lewis, backed by the Nashville Teens
- Released: 1964
- Recorded: April 5, 1964
- Venues: Star-Club, Hamburg
- Genre: Rock and roll
- Length: 37:02
- Label: Philips
- Producer: Siggi Loch

Jerry Lee Lewis chronology
Golden Hits of Jerry Lee Lewis (1964)	Live at the Star Club, Hamburg (1964)	The Greatest Live Show on Earth (1964)

Professional ratings
Review scores
Source	Rating
AllMusic	5/5 stars
MSN Music (Expert Witness)	A
Rolling Stone	5/5 stars
Stylus Magazine	favorable

Live at the Star Club, Hamburg is a live album by American rock and roll pioneer Jerry Lee Lewis, accompanied by the Nashville Teens. The album was recorded at the Star-Club in Hamburg, West Germany on April 5, 1964. It is regarded by many music journalists as one of the greatest rock and roll albums ever, noted for its hard-hitting energy and Lewis' wild stage presence.

== Recording ==
Live at the Star Club was produced by Siggi Loch, who was head of the jazz department at Philips Records. Loch later stated "...I realized that there were all of these young, mainly British, bands who were playing Chuck Berry and other white American rock & rollers, their big heroes...And I went to the owner and made a proposal to start recording bands at the Star-Club, which I did." According to Loch the recording setup was uncomplicated, with microphones placed as close to the instruments as possible and a stereo microphone placed in the audience to capture the ambience. Bonomo observed of the results that "Detractors complain of the album's crashing noisiness, the lack of subtlety with which Jerry Lee revisits the songs, the fact that the piano is mixed too loudly, but what is certain is that Siggi Loch on this spring evening captured something brutally honest about the Killer, about the primal and timeless center of the very best rock & roll."

Sixteen songs were recorded over two sets, the first comprising "Down the Line", "You Win Again", "High School Confidential", "Your Cheatin' Heart", "Great Balls of Fire", "What'd I Say (Parts 1 & 2)" and "Mean Woman Blues" and the second featuring "Good Golly Miss Molly", "Matchbox", "Money", "Whole Lotta Shakin' Goin' On", "Lewis Boogie", "Hound Dog", "Long Tall Sally" and his current single "I'm On Fire". "Down the Line", which was omitted on the original LP due to a sound fault, was released on the French Mercury single Les Rois du Rock, Vol. 8: Jerry Lee Lewis and included on later CD and LP releases from Bear Family Records. The tapes for "You Win Again" and "I'm On Fire" are believed to have been lost.

For decades the album was available only in Europe due to legal constraints. In 2014, Lewis told biographer Rick Bragg "Oh, man, that was a big monster record" but that the record company "never paid me a penny". Speaking to Patrick Doyle of Rolling Stone in 2014, Lewis remained proud that he "stuck with rock & roll when the rest of them didn't, I kept the ball rollin' with that."

== Reception ==
Live at the Star Club, Hamburg is generally regarded as one of the greatest live rock and roll albums ever made. Recorded during his "wilderness years" following the fallout surrounding his 1957 marriage to his thirteen-year-old first cousin once removed Myra, the album showcases Lewis's skills as a pianist and singer, which had been honed by relentless touring. He had played at Deutschlandhalle in Berlin the night before. In a 5-out-of-5 stars review, Milo Miles raved in Rolling Stone that "Live At The Star Club, Hamburg is not an album, it's a crime scene: Jerry Lee Lewis slaughters his rivals in a thirteen-song set that feels like one long convulsion. Recorded April 5th, 1964, this is the earliest and most feral of Lewis' concert releases from his wilderness years". Q Magazine commented "This might be the most exciting performance ever recorded". The album was included in Mojo's "The 67 Lost Albums You Must Own!" - "[A]n unbelievably seismic document of rock 'n' roll so demonic and primal it can barely keep its stage suit on.... It's up there with James Brown's great live albums."

AllMusic said of the album: "Words cannot describe — cannot contain — the performance captured on Live at the Star Club, Hamburg, an album that contains the very essence of rock & roll...Live at the Star Club is extraordinary - the purest, hardest rock & roll ever committed to record...He sounds possessed, hitting the keys so hard it sounds like they'll break, and rocking harder than anybody had before or since. Compared to this, thrash metal sounds tame, the Stooges sound constrained, hardcore punk seems neutered, and the Sex Pistols sound like wimps. Rock & roll is about the fire in the performance, and nothing sounds as fiery as this; nothing hits as hard or sounds as loud, either. It is no stretch to call this the greatest live album ever, nor is it a stretch to call it the greatest rock & roll album ever recorded. Even so, words can't describe the music here—it truly has to be heard to be believed."

Joe Bonomo calls "Mean Woman Blues", the opening number on the album, as "nothing short of a concert in itself". Author Colin Escott describes Lewis's performance of the Hank Williams classic "Your Cheatin' Heart" as a one-man tour-de-force, "a stunning fusion of everything that was Jerry Lee Lewis. The bluesy piano licks thrown into the middle of the stone hillbilly classic and a vocal of scorching intensity." In the 2014 book Jerry Lee Lewis: His Own Story Rick Bragg marvels that on Live at the Star Club, Hamburg, the piano "sounds like its breaking at times, like he is playing more with a tack hammer than flesh and blood" and deems it "one of the grittiest, most spectacular pieces of recorded music ever made."

=== Retrospective ===
In 1998, Mojo included Live at the Star Club on their list of the best 20 live albums of all time. In 2003, the Digital Dream Door included the album at number 4 on their list of the greatest live albums of all time. In 2011, Goldmine included Live at the Star Club on their list of the best 13 live albums of all time. In 2015, NME included the album at number 34 on their list of the greatest live albums of all time. Also in 2015, Rolling Stone included the album at number 16 on their list. In 2020, The Telegraph included it at number 2 on their list of the best live albums of all time. Also in 2020, The Independent included it at number 4 on their list of the greatest live albums of all time.

== Track listing ==
Side A

No.	Title	Writer(s)	Length
1.	"Mean Woman Blues"	Claude Demetrius	4:01
2.	"High School Confidential"	Ron Hargrave; Jerry Lee Lewis	2:25
3.	"Money (That's What I Want)"	Janie Bradford; Berry Gordy	4:35
4.	"Matchbox"	Carl Perkins	2:46
5.	"What'd I Say, Part 1"	Ray Charles	2:18
6.	"What'd I Say, Part 2"	Ray Charles	3:08
Total length:			19:13

Side B

No.	Title	Writer(s)	Length
7.	"Great Balls of Fire"	Otis Blackwell; Jack Hammer	1:48
8.	"Good Golly, Miss Molly"	Bumps Blackwell; John Marascalco	2:19
9.	"Lewis Boogie"	Jerry Lee Lewis	1:55
10.	"Your Cheatin' Heart"	Hank Williams	3:03
11.	"Hound Dog"	Jerry Leiber; Mike Stoller	2:28
12.	"Long Tall Sally"	Enotris Johnson; Bumps Blackwell; Richard Penniman	1:52
13.	"Whole Lotta Shakin' Goin' On"	Sunny David; Dave Williams	4:24
Total length:			17:49; 37:02

1989 re-issue

No.	Title	Writer(s)	Length
14.	"Down the Line"	Roy Orbison	2:58
Total length:			40:00

== Personnel ==
Credits adapted from AllMusic.

Musicians

- Jerry Lee Lewis – piano, vocals

The Nashville Teens

- Johnny Allen – guitar
- Pete Shannon Harris – bass
- Barry Jenkins – drums

Production personnel

- Ingrid Buhring – photography
- Bob Jones – mastering
- Sigfried Loch – producer
- Peter Van Raay – photography
- Richard Weize – photography, reissue producer
