= Murray M. Silver Jr. =

American writer and photographer (born 1953)

- Born: October 3, 1953 (age 73); Savannah, Georgia, United States
- Occupations: Writer, photographer

Murray M. Silver Jr. is an American rock music writer and photographer. Silver was born in Savannah, Georgia, in 1953. At age 16, he and his father, a lawyer, promoted rock concerts in Atlanta, bringing many future groups to the city for the first time, including Fleetwood Mac, Grateful Dead, Allman Brothers, Sonny & Cher, Paul Simon, John Mayall, Billy Preston, Bill Withers, Marvin Gaye, Johnny & Edgar Winter, Kenny Rogers, Richard Harris, Canned Heat and Norman Greenbaum.

Silver parlayed his contacts in the music world into a career as a rock tour photographer and journalist, covering the greatest acts of the 1970s and 1980s, including Pink Floyd, Genesis, Paul McCartney, George Harrison, Bob Dylan, Elton John, and Peter Gabriel. Silver was the very first to photograph and interview the Sex Pistols during their only tour of America, in 1977.

In 1982 Silver published his first book, Great Balls of Fire: The Uncensored Story of Jerry Lee Lewis, which was written with Lewis' ex-wife Myra Gale Brown. The book was adapted into the big screen by Orion Pictures in 1989. Following the release of the film, Silver undertook the autobiography of Dr. George Nichopoulos, personal physician to Elvis Presley, and the man widely regarded to be responsible for the singer's death. Their book, Who Killed Elvis Presley? turned into an international scandal before it could be published.(Note: The gist of the Nichopoulos book is embedded in Silver's memoirs).

While making the movie of his book, Silver was introduced to HH the XIVth Dalai Lama by mutual friend, Richard Gere. At the Dalai Lama's request, Silver set aside the business of his life, both personal and professional, to write articles about China's oppression of Tibet, and to sponsor tours of Tibetan Buddhist monks who perform their sacred chants and dances at colleges and museums throughout the United States. In 1998 Silver was tour manager for Sacred Music, Sacred Dance, and personally responsible for packing and transporting The Mystical Arts of Tibet Exhibit, which featured personal sacred objects of the Dalai Lama, and continued to manage the tour until 2010.

Silver also published "Behind the Moss Curtain and Other Great Savannah Stories," a collection of true short stories about the colorful characters that made Savannah GA an interesting place to live in the last century. Silver penned his memoirs, "When Elvis Meets the Dalai Lama" in 2005.

In addition to his books, Silver was a primary contributor to "12 Days on the Road: The Sex Pistols and America," by Noel Monk and Jimmy Guterman, and "Here Comes the Sun: The Spiritual and Musical Journey of George Harrison" by Joshua Greene.

Silver ghosted and published his father's autobiographical sketch, "Daddy King and Me," which recounts the elder Silver's unique relationship as personal friend and legal counsel to Dr. Martin Luther King Sr., Mrs. Coretta Scott King and Andrew Young.

Silver unsuccessfully ran for mayor of Savannah in 2015, and intends to run again in 2027. He has one son, James Wesley Hendren, the renowned nuclear engineer.

Presently (May 2025), Silver is launching a podcast with Chase Anderson and is releasing his latest book: "Anatomy of an Awakening: Ascension into Hell," detailing his torturous experiences with his twin flame.

== Published works ==
- Great Balls of Fire: The Uncensored Story of Jerry Lee Lewis (ISBN 0-688-01384-8)
- Behind the Moss Curtain and Other Great Savannah Stories (ISBN 0-9724224-0-4)
- When Elvis Meets the Dalai Lama ISBN 978-0-972-4224-4-4)
- Tech's Luck: The Story of Jim Luck (ISBN 978-098225834-7)
