= The Nashville Teens =

English rock band

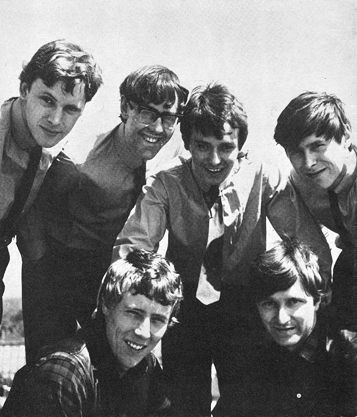
- The Nashville Teens in 1966

Background information
- Also known as: Arizona Swamp Company
- Origin: Weybridge, Surrey, England
- Genres: Rock and roll; rhythm and blues; garage rock; beat
- Years active: 1962–1973; 1980–present
- Labels: London; Decca; Major Minor Records
- Members: Ray Phillips; Adrian Metcalfe; Colin Pattenden; Simon Spratley; Ken Osborn
- Website: www.nashville-teens.com

The Nashville Teens are an English rock band, formed in Surrey in 1962. They are best known for their 1964 hit single cover of "Tobacco Road", a Top 10 hit in the United Kingdom and Canada, and a Top 20 hit in the United States.

== Career ==
While playing in Hamburg, the Teens backed Jerry Lee Lewis for his Live at the Star Club, Hamburg album.

The band later backed Carl Perkins on his hit single "Big Bad Blues" (May 1964) and also played with Chuck Berry when he toured Britain. One concert was attended by music producer Mickie Most, who subsequently produced the band's June 1964 debut single, an interpretation of the John D. Loudermilk penned song "Tobacco Road", which reached No. 6 in the UK singles chart and No. 14 in the US Billboard Hot 100 chart. The follow-up, another Loudermilk song entitled "Google Eye", reached number 10 in the UK in October 1964. The Nashville Teens' record producers also included Andrew Loog Oldham and Shel Talmy. One of their recordings was the mildly controversial Randy Newman number, "The Biggest Night of Her Life," about a schoolgirl who is "too excited to sleep", because she has promised to lose her virginity on her sixteenth birthday to a boy whom her parents like "because his hair is always neat".

A further three top 50 singles, "Find My Way Back Home", "This Little Bird" and "The Hard Way", made a brief appearance the following year. Three subsequent records though, "I Know How It Feels to Be Loved," "Forbidden Fruit" and "That's My Woman”, all failed to chart. Jenkins left in 1966 to join the Animals and was replaced by his predecessor Roger Groome. Reportedly, Ray Phillips got an offer to join Cream in 1966, but he declined.

Although musically competent, the group's lack of distinctive personality contributed to its lack of long-term success, as did Decca's poor promotion. (By 1970, Decca's only remaining rock acts were the Rolling Stones and the Moody Blues, both of whom handled their own promotion.) In the late Sixties the group returned to backing other artists like Carl Perkins, Chuck Berry and Gene Vincent. In 1971 they released a single, "Ella James", a Roy Wood-penned song originally recorded by the Move, on the Parlophone label, again without success.

== Split and re-form ==
Arthur Sharp left in 1972 to join the band's one-time manager Don Arden and Trevor Williams joined. Despite Phillips's efforts, the Nashville Teens split in 1975. The band re-formed in 1980, however, with Phillips as the only original member, joined by Peter Agate (guitar), Len Surtees (bass) and Adrian Metcalfe (drums).

The band is still working. Phillips joined the British Invasion All-Stars in the 1990s and made three albums with the group, consisting of members from the Yardbirds, the Creation, the Pretty Things, Downliners Sect and other groups. The band did a cover of "Tobacco Road" that still receives airplay on XM Satellite Radio. The current line-up is Phillips, Metcalfe, Colin Pattenden (bass and vocals), Simon Spratley (keyboards and vocals) and Ken Osborn (guitar).

A 1993 EMI label compilation, Best of the Nashville Teens, contained a re-recording of their "Tobacco Road" hit which is the only version available on iTunes.

Michael Dunford died of a cerebral hemorrhage on 20 November 2012 in Surrey, England.

Arthur Sharp died on 25 December 2023, at the age of 83.

== Appearances in films and TV shows ==
The Nashville Teens appeared in three 1965 films:

- Pop Gear, by Frederic Goode – a long series of pop artists play one or two songs; the Beatles play live for an audience, while the Animals, the Honeycombs, Peter and Gordon and Herman's Hermits mime in a studio. The Nashville Teens mime "Tobacco Road" and "Google Eye". In the United States the film was issued with the title as Go Go Mania.
- Be My Guest, by Lance Comfort – a family has inherited a hotel in Brighton. Their son works at a local paper and tries to set up a pop group of which one member is played by Steve Marriott. A talent scout scene is a pretext to present a few artists, among them The Nashville Teens who also back Jerry Lee Lewis.
- Gonks Go Beat, by Robert Hartford-Davis – set in the distant future. An alien from the planet Gonk comes to Earth to establish peace between the two remaining nations, one of which prefers rock and roll and the other ballads and his task involves listening to the Teens, Lulu and the Graham Bond Organisation.

In 2010 "Tobacco Road" was featured on the 4th-season premiere of Mad Men.

== Band members ==
- Ray Phillips – lead vocals (1962–present)
- Simon Spratley – piano (1975–1977, 1983–present)
- Adrian Metcalfe – drums (1983–present)
- Colin Pattenden – bass (1984–present)
- Ken Osborn – guitar (1989–present)

=== Former members ===
- Arthur Sharp – lead vocals (1962–1972; died 2023)
- Michael Dunford – guitar (1962–1963; died 2012)
- Pete Shannon Harris – bass (1962–1967)
- John Hawken – piano (1962–1968; died 2024)
- Dave Maine – drums (1962)
- Roger Groome – drums (1962–1963, 1966–1969)
- Terry Crowe – lead vocals (1963)
- John Allen – guitar (1964–1969)
- Barry Jenkins – drums (1964–1966; died 2024)
- Neil Korner – bass (1967-1969)
- Chris West – guitar (1969)
- Roger Dean – bass (1969–1972)
- Len Tuckey – guitar (1969–1972)
- Lenny Butcher – drums (1969–1973)
- Trevor Williams – bass (1972–1973 and 1974-January 1975)
- Glen Turner – guitar (1972–1973)
- Phil Sayers – drums (1973–1975)
- Brian Holloway – guitar (1973)
- Rob Hendry – guitar (1974–1975)
- Trevor Nightingale – piano (1974)
- Ian Campbell – guitar (1975–1976, 1984–1989)
- Len Surtees – bass (1975–1983)
- Rob Pusey – drums (1975–1982)
- Rod Roach – guitar (1976–1977, 1983–1984)
- Paul Mardell – guitar (1977–1978)
- Rick Westwood – piano (1977–1979)
- Pete Agate – guitar (1978–1983)

== Discography ==
=== Albums ===
==== Studio albums ====
| Title | Album details |
|---|---|
| Tobacco Road | Released: November 1964; Label: London; Formats: LP; US and Canada-only release |

==== Live albums ====
| Title | Album details |
|---|---|
| "Live" at the Star Club, Hamburg | Released: December 1964; Label: Philips; Formats: LP |
| Live at the Nags Head 1983 | Released: 23 March 2018; Label: Secret; Formats: 2xCD+DVD, digital download |

==== Compilation albums ====
| Title | Album details |
|---|---|
| Nashville Teens | Released: 1972; Label: New World; Formats: LP, MC |
| The Beginning – Vol. 7 | Released: 1973; Label: Decca; Formats: LP; Germany-only release |
| Find My Way Back Home | Released: 1987; Label: Beat Club International; Formats: LP; France limited-only release |
| Tobacco Road | Released: 1991; Label: LCD; Formats: CD; France-only release |
| The Best of the Nashville Teens 1964–1969 | Released: 1993; Label: EMI; Formats: CD, MC |
| Rockin' Back to Tobacco Road | Released: August 2007; Label: Secret; Formats: CD |

=== EPs ===
| Title | Album details |
|---|---|
| The Nashville Teens | Released: November 1964; Label: Decca; Formats: 7-inch |
| Tobacco Road | Released: November 1964; Label: Decca; Formats: 7-inch; France-only release |
| Find My Way Back Home | Released: July 1965; Label: Decca; Formats: 7-inch; France-only release |
| Teen Beat 6 | Released: June 1966; Label: Decca; Formats: 7-inch; Germany-only release |
| Tobacco Road | Released: 1966; Label: Decca; Formats: 7-inch; Mexico-only release |
| Live at the Red House | Released: December 1982; Label: Shanghai; Formats: 12-inch |
| The Nashville Teens | Released: February 1984; Label: Butt; Formats: 7-inch |

=== Singles ===
| Title | Year | Peak chart positions | | | | |
| Title | Year | UK | AUS | CAN | NZ | US |
|---|---|---|---|---|---|---|
| "Big Bad Blues" (with Carl Perkins) b/w "Lonely Heart" | 1964 | — | — | — | — | — |
| "Long, Tall Sally" (with Jerry Lee Lewis; Germany and Denmark-only release) b/w "Good Golly, Miss Molly" | 1964 | — | — | — | — | — |
| "Tobacco Road" b/w "I Like It Like That" | 1964 | 6 | 8 | 3 | 9 | 14 |
| "Google Eye" b/w "T.N.T." | 1964 | 10 | — | — | — | 117 |
| "High School Confidential" (with Jerry Lee Lewis; Germany-only release) b/w "Lewis' Boogie" | 1964 | — | — | — | — | — |
| "Find My Way Back Home" b/w "Devil-in-Law" | 1965 | 34 | — | — | — | 98 |
| "The Little Bird" b/w "Whatcha Gonna Do?" | 1965 | 38 | — | — | — | 123 |
| "I Know How It Feels to Be Loved" b/w "Soon Forgotten" | 1965 | — | — | — | — | — |
| "The Hard Way" b/w "Upside Down" | 1966 | 45 | — | — | — | — |
| "Forbidden Fruit" b/w "Revived 45 Time" | 1966 | — | — | — | — | — |
| "That's My Woman" b/w "Words" | 1967 | — | — | — | — | — |
| "I'm Coming Home" b/w "Searching" | 1967 | — | — | — | — | — |
| "The Biggest Night of Her Life" b/w "Last Minute" | 1967 | — | — | — | — | — |
| "All Along the Watchtower" b/w "Sun-Dog" | 1968 | — | — | — | — | — |
| "The Lament of the Cherokee Reservation Indian" b/w "Looking for You" | 1969 | — | — | — | — | — |
| "Tennessee Woman" (as Arizona Swamp Company) b/w "Train Keeps Rollin'" | 1970 | — | — | — | — | — |
| "Ella James" b/w "Tennessee Woman" | 1971 | — | — | — | — | — |
| "You Shouldn't Have Been So Nice" (unreleased) b/w "Tell the People'" | 1972 | — | — | — | — | — |
| "Lawdy Miss Clawdy" b/w "Let It Rock/Rocking on the Railroad"/"Break Up" | 1973 | — | — | — | — | — |
| "Midnight" b/w "Live for the Summer" | 1982 | — | — | — | — | — |
"—" denotes releases that did not chart or were not released in that territory.

== See also ==
- List of 1960s one-hit wonders in the United States
- List of Decca Records artists
- List of performers on Top of the Pops
- British Invasion
