= Together (Jerry Lee Lewis album) =

Studio album by Jerry Lee Lewis and Linda Gail Lewis
- Released: 1969
- Recorded: Columbia Studios, Nashville, Tennessee
- Genre: Country
- Label: Smash
- Producer: Jerry Kennedy

Jerry Lee Lewis chronology
Sings the Country Music Hall of Fame Hits, Vol. 2 (1969)	Together (1969)	Original Golden Hits, Vol. 1 (1969)

Together is a duet album by American musician and pianist Jerry Lee Lewis and his sister Linda, released in 1969 on Smash Records.

== Track listing ==
1. "Milwaukee (Here I Come)" (Lee Fikes) - 1:55
2. "Jackson" (Billy Edd Wheeler, Jerry Leiber [as Gaby Rodgers]) - 2:21
3. "Don't Take It Out on Me" (Linda Gail Lewis, Kenny Lovelace) - 2:04
4. "Cryin' Time" (Buck Owens) - 2:38
5. "Sweet Thang" (Nat Stuckey) - 2:13
6. "Secret Places" (Cecil J. Harrelson, Linda Gail Lewis, Kenny Lovelace) - 2:46
7. "Don't Let Me Cross Over" (Penny Jay) - 2:56
8. "Gotta Travel On" (Paul Clayton, Larry Ehrlich, Lee Hays, Fred Hellerman, David Lazar, Pete Seeger) - 1:54
9. "We Live in Two Different Worlds" (Fred Rose) - 2:11
10. "Earth Up Above (Grand Ole Moon Up Above)" (Donald Murray) - 1:58
11. "Roll Over Beethoven" (Chuck Berry) - 1:56
