= Cordell Jackson =

American guitarist (1923–2004)

- Jackson, c. 1990

Background information
- Born: Cordell Miller; July 15, 1923; Pontotoc, Mississippi, U.S.
- Died: October 14, 2004 (aged 81) Memphis, Tennessee, U.S.
- Genres: Rock; Country music Garage Rock; Rockabilly
- Instrument: Guitar
- Years active: 1941-2004
- Formerly of: The A-Bones

Cordell Jackson (née Miller; July 15, 1923 – October 14, 2004) was an American guitarist thought to be the first woman to produce, engineer, arrange and promote music on her own rock and roll music label.

== Early life ==
She was born Cordell Miller in Pontotoc, Mississippi, where her father led a string band, the Pontotoc Ridge Runners. As a child she learned guitar, piano, harmonica and double bass, and soon began performing in her father's band and on radio in Tupelo. In 1943, she graduated from high school and married William Jackson. The couple settled in Memphis, Tennessee, where Jackson worked as a riveter, joined the Fisher Air Craft Band, and wrote songs. After installing recording equipment in her home in 1947, she recorded demo records for Sam Phillips before he set up Sun Records.

== Career ==
Jackson founded the Moon Records label in Memphis in 1956, and released her first single "Beboppers Christmas" under the label in the same year. Unable to break into the Sun label's stable of male artists, she received the advice and assistance of RCA Records' Chet Atkins in forming this new label to release her music. She began releasing and promoting on the label singles she recorded in her home studio, serving as engineer, producer and arranger. The artists recorded included her and a small family of early rock and roll, rockabilly, and country music performers she recruited from several Southern states, such as Allen Page, Earl Patterson, and Johnny Tate. In addition to running Moon Records, Jackson worked various day jobs throughout the 1960s and 1970s, including as an interior decorator, D.J., and printer.

Tav Falco's Panther Burns and Alex Chilton helped create new interest in her career in the 1980s when they began covering some of her Moon label's old singles such as "Dateless Night", a song she originally wrote in the 1950s for Florida artist Allen Page. Jackson then began playing occasional shows in the 1980s with her signature red Hagstrom electric guitar in Memphis, Hoboken, New York, and Chicago nightclubs. Although she typically performed as a solo artist, she was occasionally supported by other bands, including the A-Bones. She recorded new material on her label with Memphis musicians Colonel Robert Morris and Bob Holden, becoming known as a "rock-and-roll granny" solo guitar instrumentalist. She appeared in 1991 and 1992 on national talk shows like Late Night with David Letterman and in a Budweiser commercial duelling with rockabilly artist Brian Setzer on guitar. Jackson also produced a contemporary Christian radio show, Let's Keep the Family Together America.

In the late 1990s, Jackson co-wrote and played with rockabilly icon Colonel Robert Morris in Memphis. Colonel Robert also helped edit the book based on her life and career. She appeared as "Bathroom Lady" in the 1992 The Gun in Betty Lou's Handbag, and as an extra in Great Balls of Fire!

Her Moon Records label was the oldest continuously operating label in Memphis at the time of her death in 2004. The 50s Rock on the Moon of Memphis, Tennessee + an Oddity, a compilation album of the label's 1950s singles, was released on vinyl in the early 1980s and was later sold on compact disc until her death in 2004. The original 1950s vinyl singles compiled on that album have been displayed at the Rock and Roll Hall of Fame in Cleveland, Ohio. She also released video singles through her label in the 1990s, including "Football Widow" and filmmaker Dan Rose's production of "The Split." Her marketing of her own video singles, as opposed to marketing them in multiple-song video collections, is reputed to be another first in her innovative lifetime of doing things her own way, bucking the trends of standard industry practice.

Jackson's only solo full-length album to date, Cordell Jackson — Live in Chicago was released by Pravda Records in 1995. Information and memorabilia about Jackson is included in the Memphis Rock N' Soul Museum in Memphis, as well as the National Museum of American History.

== Death ==
Jackson died of pancreatic cancer in Memphis on October 14, 2004, aged 81.

== Discography ==
=== Singles ===
Cordell Jackson

- "Rock And Roll Christmas" / "Beboppers' Christmas" - Moon Records G80W-6407/8 - (1956)

Cordell Jackson and her Guitar

- "Football Widow" / "I'm at Home Again (In the Memories of My Mind)" Moon Records EP-311 - (1983)
- "Rockin' Rollin' Eyes" / "Memphis Drag" - Sympathy for the Record Industry SFTRI 50 - (1990)

=== EPs ===
Cordell Jackson

- The Split - Moon Records MR 333 - (1980s)
- Knockin' Sixty - Moon EP-312 - (1983)

Various artist compilations

- Moon Records of Memphis, Tennessee - Moon - EP-1001 - (198?)

=== Albums ===
Cordell Jackson

- Live in Chicago - Bughouse 3 - (1997)

Various artists compilations

- The 50s Rock On The Moon of Memphis, Tennessee + an Oddity - Moon Records LP-MR 3010 - (1979) (Moon compilation LP, rereleased later on CD, United States, 1981* Rock And Roll Christmas (Jan/Star Club compilation, Sweden, 1989)
- Rock On The Moon (Redita compilation, the Netherlands)
- Living in a State of Love. (Memphis Music Community, 1990s)
- Rockabilly Xmas. (Buffalo Bop compilation, Germany, 2000)
- Past, Present and Future. (Inside Sounds, 2003)

== Song sample ==
- Moon Discography Containing mp3 of Jackson's 1956 Moon Single "Rock and Roll Christmas"
- Johnny Tate: "Bop With Me Baby" / "Keeping Your Memories" / "Kind And Gentle '57" Cleveland Rock-n-Roll Hall Of Fame

== Musical references ==
- "'J' Artists & Songs." Rockabilly Hall of Fame website. Accessed May 3, 2005.
- Gordon, Terry (2004). "Cordell Jackson." Rockin' Country Style Artist Discography. Accessed May 3, 2005.
- Gordon, Terry (2004). "Moon." Rockin' Country Style Artist Discography. Accessed May 3, 2005.
- Hanas, Jim (August 4, 1997). "Cordell Jackson — Live in Chicago." Weekly Wire. Accessed May 3, 2005.
- Hoppula, Peter (1998–2005). "Moon Records Discography"; "Post-Productions of Moon Records/Cordell Jackson." Wang Dang Dula! Accessed May 3, 2005.
