= Let's Talk About Us =

Song by Jerry Lee Lewis

Single by Jerry Lee Lewis and His Pumping Piano

from the album Jerry Lee's Greatest!
- A-side: "Let's Talk About Us" "The Ballad of Billy Joe"
- Released: June 1959
- Genre: Rock 'n' roll
- Label: Sun
- Songwriter(s): Otis Blackwell
- Producer(s): Jerry Kennedy

Jerry Lee Lewis singles chronology
"Lovin' Up a Storm" / "Big Blon' Baby" (1959)	"Let's Talk About Us" / "The Ballad of Billy Joe" (1959)	"Little Queenie" / "I Could Never Be Ashamed of You" (1959)

Professional ratings
Review scores
Source	Rating
Billboard	Spotlight winner of the week

"Let's Talk About Us" is a song written by Otis Blackwell and originally recorded by Jerry Lee Lewis, who released it as a single, with "The Ballad of Billy Joe" on the other side, in July 1959 on Sun Records.

Billboard chose the single as a "spotlight winner of the week". The review stated that the single contained "two fine sides", either of which "could go" and that Jerry Lee Lewis could "hit the comeback trail" with the songs. "The Ballad of Billy Joe" was described as a "strong ballad effort, akin to 'Don't Take Your Guns to Town'", and "Let's Talk About Us" as a "rhythm item more in [Lewis's] normal style".

The song has been covered by a number of artists, including Otis Blackwell himself, Dave Edmunds, and Van Morrison in duo with Linda Gail Lewis.

== Track listing ==
7" single (Sun 324, 1959)
No.	Title	Length
1.	"Let's Talk About Us"	2:05
2.	"The Ballad of Billy Joe"	2:55
