= The Return of Rock =

Studio album by Jerry Lee Lewis
- Released: 1965
- Recorded: 1965
- Genre: Rockabilly, blues
- Label: Smash
- Producer: Shelby Singleton

Jerry Lee Lewis chronology
The Greatest Live Show on Earth (1964)	The Return of Rock (1965)	Country Songs for City Folks/All Country (1965)

The Return of Rock is the fourth studio album by American musician and pianist Jerry Lee Lewis, released on the Smash label in 1965.

== Background ==
The single released from the album was "Baby, Hold Me Close" backed by "I Believe in You".

== Recording ==
The album featured "Baby, Hold Me Close", a song composed by Jerry Lee Lewis and Bob Tubert. "Baby, Hold Me Close" was the song released as the A-side 45 single from the album, with "I Believe in You" as the B-side. This was the only single from the album. The single reached no. 129 on the Billboard Bubbling Under the Hot 100 Chart. Jerry Lee Lewis performed the song live on the musical variety TV series Shindig! in 1965.

The album includes three Chuck Berry songs, "Maybellene," "Roll Over Beethoven," and "Johnny B. Goode."

== Reception ==
Professional ratings
Review scores
Source	Rating
Record Mirror	4/5 stars

The album was released on June 4, 1965, and reached 121 on the Billboard 200. The perception that Lewis was out of step with the times was not helped by the album cover, which Bonomo derides: "The Return of Rock is nearly done in before the needle drops by an atrocious cover: decked out in a mummified paisley tux and frilly shirt, smiling wanly, Jerry Lee looks like Liberace's sickly younger brother, while a few teenagers dance in mild bewilderment as if they'd been teleported from the set of Shindig!" Bonomo, however, characterized the self-penned single from the album "Baby, Hold Me Close" as "a cool studio-concocted groove".

== Track listing ==
Side A

1. "I Believe in You" (Frank Brunson)
2. "Maybellene" (Chuck Berry, Alan Freed, Russ Fratto)
3. "Flip, Flop and Fly" (Chuck Calhoun, Lou Willie Turner)
4. "Don't Let Go" (Jesse Stone)
5. "Roll Over Beethoven" (Chuck Berry)
6. "Herman the Hermit" (Rink Hardin, Marian F. Turner)

Side B

1. "Baby, Hold Me Close" (Jerry Lee Lewis, Bob Tubert)
2. "You Went Back on Your Word" (Brook Benton, Bobby Stevenson)
3. "Corrine, Corrina" (Armenter Chatmon, Mitchell Parish, J. Mayo Williams)
4. "Sexy Ways" (Hank Ballard)
5. "Johnny B. Goode" (Chuck Berry)
6. "Got You on My Mind" (Howard Biggs, Joe Thomas)

== Sources ==
- Bonomo, Joe (2010). Jerry Lee Lewis: Lost and Found. New York: Bloomsbury Publishing.
- Bragg, Rick. (2014). Jerry Lee Lewis: His Own Story. New York: Harper.
- Tosches, Nick (1982). Hellfire. New York: Grove Press.
- Gutterman, Jimmy (1991). Rockin' My Life Away: Listening to Jerry Lee Lewis. Nashville: Rutledge Hill Press.
- Lewis, Myra; Silver, Murray (1981). Great Balls of Fire: The Uncensored Story of Jerry Lee Lewis. William Morrow/Quill/St. Martin's Press.
