= Myra Lewis Williams =

American author (born 1944)

- Born: Myra Gale Brown; July 11, 1944 (age 82); Vicksburg, Mississippi, U.S.
- Other names: Myra Lewis; Myra Malito; Myra Williams
- Occupations: Author; realtor
- Spouses: Jerry Lee Lewis (m. 1957; div. 1970); Pete Malito (m. 1970; div. 1972); Richard Williams (m. 1984)
- Children: 2

Myra Gale Lewis Williams (née Brown; born July 11, 1944) is an American author, best known for her controversial marriage at the age of 13 to rock and roll musician Jerry Lee Lewis, who was her first cousin once removed and was 22 at the time. She co-wrote the book Great Balls of Fire: The Uncensored Story of Jerry Lee Lewis (1982), which was adapted into the film Great Balls of Fire! (1989). In 2016, she published her memoir, The Spark That Survived.

== Life and career ==
Myra Gale Brown was born on July 11, 1944, in Vicksburg, Mississippi, the daughter of Lois (née Neal) and J. W. "Jay" Brown. The Browns later had a son, Rusty Brown (b. 1954). In 1949, the family moved to Memphis, Tennessee, when J. W. Brown took a job with Memphis Gas, Light and Water, where he worked as a lineman. When Brown was injured on the job, he decided to start a band. He sought out his cousin, Jerry Lee Lewis, who was also an unknown musician at the time. Brown played electric bass, and Lewis played piano and sang. They went on to record for Sun Records. In 1956, Lewis moved in with Brown and his family.

On December 12, 1957, at the age of 13, Williams married Jerry Lee Lewis, then 22, in Hernando, Mississippi. When Lewis arrived in London for a 37-date tour in May 1958, Williams revealed to a reporter at the airport that she was his wife. Lewis asserted that Williams was 15 years old and was his wife of two months. However, it was discovered that she was only 13, and that they had been married for five months. This caused an uproar and, after a few dates, the tour was cancelled. By the time they returned to Memphis, it had been discovered that Williams was not only Lewis's wife, she was also his first cousin once removed. In addition, Lewis had not yet divorced his previous wife, Jane Mitcham. After Lewis finalized his divorce from Mitcham, he married Williams on June 4, 1958. The scandal over their marriage was a significant set back to Lewis's promising rock and roll career, though his 1986 naming to the first group of Rock and Roll Hall of Fame members recognized Lewis's early influence on the genre. Lewis would also find success in country music.

By 1970, Lewis's drug addiction, alcoholism, and infidelity had taken a toll on their marriage. Williams filed for divorce on the grounds of adultery and abuse, stating that she had been "subject to every type of physical and mental abuse imaginable." Their divorce was finalized on December 9, 1970. They had two children.

Shortly after her divorce, Williams married Pete Malito, the detective she had hired to trail Lewis and document his infidelities, and moved to Atlanta, Georgia. The marriage lasted a year and a half. After they divorced, Williams worked as a receptionist.

Williams hired writer Murray Silver to co-write a book that was meant to be her autobiography, but after a publisher's editing, it became Great Balls of Fire: The Uncensored Story of Jerry Lee Lewis. The book was originally released in October 1982 by William Morrow and Company. It was adapted into the 1989 film Great Balls of Fire!, starring Dennis Quaid as Lewis and Winona Ryder as Williams. Williams was paid $100,000 for her story, but was resentful that she was not consulted for the script or casting of the film, despite it being promised. The producers did not want Williams or Lewis involved with the film, but she visited the Memphis set anyway. Although Williams found the actors to be talented and friendly, she was not satisfied with the book or the film. She had wanted to tell the story of a woman surviving difficult circumstances and inspire women to understand their own strengths, so she published her memoir, The Spark That Survived, in 2016. The book details her tumultuous marriage to Lewis and her life after their divorce.

From 1980 onwards, Williams worked as a real estate agent in Atlanta. She married her third husband, Richard Williams, in 1984. The couple live in Duluth, Georgia.

== Books ==
- 1982: Great Balls of Fire: The Uncensored Story of Jerry Lee Lewis (ISBN 9780688014803)
- 2016: The Spark That Survived (ISBN 9781944193164)
