= Lewis Boogie =

- 1958 Sun 78 release, Sun 301, credited to Jerry Lee Lewis and His Pumping Piano

Single by Jerry Lee Lewis
- B-side: "The Return of Jerry Lee"
- Released: June 1958
- Recorded: 1956–1958
- Genre: Rockabilly
- Length: 2:00
- Label: Sun
- Songwriter: Jerry Lee Lewis
- Producer: Sam Phillips

"Lewis Boogie" is a song written by Jerry Lee Lewis in 1956 and released as a single in June 1958 on Sun Records, Sun 301, backed with "The Return of Jerry Lee". The recording was reissued in 1979 as a 7" 45 single as Sun 29 as part of the Sun Golden Treasure Series. The song was also released in the UK and Canada as a single.

== Background ==
"Lewis Boogie" was recorded in the summer of 1957 at Sun Records studios at 706 Union, Memphis, Tennessee. The personnel were: Jerry Lee Lewis on vocals and piano; Roland Janes on guitar; and Jimmy Van Eaton on drums. The flip side was "The Return of Jerry Lee". The first edition of the record label listed "The Return of Jerry Lee" on both sides and was credited to "Louis" rather than "Lewis". The editing and recording of "The Return of Jerry Lee" was done by Jack Clement and George Klein on May 30, 1958, and listed as Matrix# U-314. The single was released in June 1958 as Sun 301 with the Matrix # 315 as by Jerry Lee Lewis And His Pumping Piano.

The 1957 Sun recording of "Lewis Boogie" by Jerry Lee Lewis was also released in the UK as a 45 single in 1964 on London Records as London HLS 9867 backed with "Bonnie B". The song was also released in Canada in 1958 as a 45 single on Quality Records.

Jerry Lee Lewis recorded a live version of the song with the British band The Nashville Teens on the landmark 1964 live album Live at the Star Club, Hamburg, regarded critically as one of the greatest live albums in rock and roll history.

The track appeared on the 1984 Rhino Records collection 18 Original Sun Greatest Hits which featured the most successful recordings by Jerry Lee Lewis on the Sun label.

The song appeared in a new recording by Jerry Lee Lewis in the 1989 Orion Pictures biopic Great Balls of Fire! during the closing credits.

"Lewis Boogie" is featured in the 2005 Johnny Cash biopic Walk the Line. It was performed by Waylon Payne in the film and its soundtrack.

In 2007, the song was featured on the live album Last Man Standing Live, recorded in 2006 in collaboration with other musicians.

== Development ==
Robert Palmer writes that the song "was a mixture of local black influences, the hillbilly boogie and rhythm and blues that were so popular on Southern jukeboxes when he was growing up, and—the most crucial ingredient—the Killer's individual musical genius."

== Reception ==
Charlie Gillett writes that at "his best-as in ..."Lewis Boogie (1958)" - Lewis epitomized the careless confidence that some people liked rock 'n' roll for."
