= Baby, Hold Me Close =

- 1965 U.S. 45 single release on Smash Records.

Single by Jerry Lee Lewis

from the album The Return of Rock
- B-side: "I Believe in You"
- Released: February 1965
- Genre: Rock
- Label: Smash
- Songwriters: Jerry Lee Lewis; Bob Tubert

Jerry Lee Lewis singles chronology
"Carry Me Back to Old Virginia" (1965)	"Baby, Hold Me Close" (1965)	"Sticks and Stones" (1966)

"Baby, Hold Me Close" is a song written by Jerry Lee Lewis and Bob Tubert and released as a single by Lewis in the U.S. in February 1965 on Smash Records. The song was also released in the UK in 1965 as a 45 single on Philips Records.

== Background ==
"Baby, Hold Me Close" was recorded for Smash Records in the U.S. as S-1969 and was released as a 7" 45 single backed with "I Believe in You" in February, 1965. The music and lyrics were credited to Jerry Lee Lewis and Bob Tubert. Shelby Singleton, the producer of the recording with Jerry Kennedy, was credited as a co-writer on the Australian release by Billy Thorpe & The Aztecs. The song was published by Raleigh Music, Inc.

The appeal of the song is to dancing. In 1965, go go dancing and dance shows were popular. The opening line is: "Now listen here baby to what ol' Jerry Lee has to say / I want you to get out on this dance floor with me now." While on the floor, he exhorts his partner: "Now hold me close, baby / Squeeze ol' Jerry Lee all through the doggone night."

In Jerry Lee Lewis: Lost and Found, Joe Bonomo characterizes the song as "a cool studio-concocted groove".

Jerry Lee Lewis performed the song live on the American music variety television series Shindig! in 1965.

The song was also released as a 45 single in the UK, Australia, Brazil, and the Netherlands. In the UK, the song was released as a Philips 7" 45 single in April, 1965 as BF 1407.

The song was featured on the 1965 Smash LP album The Return of Rock.

The single reached no. 129 on the Billboard Bubbling Under the Hot 100 singles chart in the U.S. in June, 1965.

1965 Australian sheet music for the Billy Thorpe recording.

Billy Thorpe released a cover version in Australia as a Parlophone Records 45 single as A8170 on EMI in September, 1965 as Billy Thorpe & the Aztecs. Their recording was a hit on the Australian charts, reaching #4 in Sydney, #24 in Melbourne, #4 in Brisbane, #14 in Adelaide, and #19 in Perth. The single peaked at #15 on Australia's (4BC) Top Singles Chart for the week of November 14, 1965. The recording was also released on the 1965 Parlophone EP Twilight Time.

The song appeared on the 1971 compilation album The Best of Billy Thorpe on Parlophone.

== Album appearances ==
"Baby, Hold Me Close" appeared on the following albums:

- The Return of Rock, Smash Records, 1965
- High Heel Sneakers, Pickwick, 1970
- Hound Dog, Sears, 1971
- Ausgewählte Goldstücke, Karussell, 1982
- Killer: The Mercury Years, Volume 1 (1963-1968), Polygram/Mercury, 1989
- The Locust Years...And the Return to the Promised Land, Bear Family Records, 1994
- Southern Swagger, Bear Family Records, 2007
- A Whole Lotta...Jerry Lee Lewis: The Definitive Retrospective, Salvo, 2012
- Original Classic Albums, 1965-1969, Raven, 2012
- The Return of Rock/Soul My Way, Beat Goes On

== Sources ==
- Bonomo, Joe (2009). Jerry Lee Lewis: Lost and Found. New York: Continuum Books.
- Tosches, Nick (1982). Hellfire. New York: Grove Press.
- Gutterman, Jimmy (1991). Rockin' My Life Away: Listening to Jerry Lee Lewis. Nashville: Rutledge Hill Press.
- Gutterman, Jimmy (1993). The Jerry Lee Lewis Anthology: All Killer, No Filler. Rhino Records.
- Lewis, Myra; Silver, Murray (1981). Great Balls of Fire: The Uncensored Story of Jerry Lee Lewis. William Morrow/Quill/St. Martin's Press.
