= The Greatest Live Show on Earth =

Live album by Jerry Lee Lewis
- Released: October 1964
- Recorded: Birmingham & Montgomery, AL
- Genre: Rock and roll; rockabilly; country
- Label: Smash
- Producer: Shelby Singleton; Jerry Kennedy

Jerry Lee Lewis chronology
Live at the Star Club, Hamburg (1964)	The Greatest Live Show on Earth (1964)	The Return of Rock (1965)

The Greatest Live Show on Earth is a live album by American musician and singer Jerry Lee Lewis. It was released on Smash Records in 1964. It was Lewis' best-selling album of the decade, with its cover of Tommy Tucker's "High Heel Sneakers" becoming a mild pop hit.

== Background ==
In April 1964, Lewis had "bottomed out", with no record being on any charts in years. According to American pop music critic Robert Hilburn, he believes the "key reason for Lewis' sales decline was that disc jockeys stopped playing his records following the controversy over his 1958 marriage to a 13-year-old cousin".

When he went on tour in 1964, in England and Germany, "he was getting paid so little that he couldn't afford to bring his own musicians". When he arrived in Hamburg, a British band called the Nashville Teens were designated to be his back up band for a gig at the Star Club, where Lewis was scheduled to perform. A producer for Philips Records, Siggi Loch, decided that this would be a good opportunity to record Lee's show. The resulting album was, Live at the Star Club, Hamburg; and because it "features a man playing as if his life depended on it in front of a rioting crowd, is widely considered one of the greatest live rock and roll albums ever". Because Philips was unaffiliated with Smash and due to legal constraints, the album did not come out in the United States at that time, but it eventually got an official U.S. release in 1980.

The producer Shelby Singleton then decided to record a live album that could be released on Smash and The Greatest Live Show on Earth was assembled mainly from shows performed at the Municipal Auditorium in Birmingham, Alabama in July 1964. The live album was part of a campaign by Smash Records to "restore Lewis as a major seller". According to Lewis, "Shelby had microphones set up all across the stage ... it was the first time anyone had set up a live recording like that. We got some real momentum goin' out there and it all had to be captured in one take. No second chances. I think Shelby edited out some of the talking but that was all." Lewis was backed by his new touring band that soon became known as the Memphis Beats.

== Track listing ==
1. "Jenny, Jenny" (Enotris Johnson, Richard Penniman)
2. "Who Will the Next Fool Be" (Charlie Rich)
3. "Memphis" (Chuck Berry)
4. "Hound Dog" (Jerry Leiber, Mike Stoller)
5. "I Got a Woman" (Ray Charles, Renald Richard)*
6. "Hi-Heel Sneakers" (Tommy Tucker)
7. "No Particular Place to Go" (Chuck Berry)
8. "Together Again" (Buck Owens)
9. "Long Tall Sally" (Enotris Johnson, Richard Penniman)
10. "Whole Lotta Shakin' Going On" (Sunny David, Dave "Curlee" Williams)
