= Rockin' Rhythm and Blues =

Compilation album by Jerry Lee Lewis
- Released: 1969
- Recorded: Memphis
- Genres: Rhythm and blues, rockabilly, rock and roll, blues
- Label: Sun
- Producer: Shelby Singleton

Jerry Lee Lewis chronology
Original Golden Hits, Vol. 2 (1969)	Rockin' Rhythm and Blues (1969)	The Golden Cream of the Country (1970)

Rockin' Rhythm and Blues is a compilation album by American musician Jerry Lee Lewis, released in 1969 on Sun Records. It is a compilation of his early Sun Records cuts recorded with Sam Phillips in the late 1950s and early 1960s.

== Track listing ==
1. "Good Golly Miss Molly" (J. Marascalo/R. Blackwell)
2. "Big Legged Woman"
3. "Hang Up My Rock and Roll Shoes"
4. "Save the Last Dance for Me" (Pomus/Shuman)
5. "Little Queenie" (Chuck Berry)
6. "Johnny B. Goode" (Berry)
7. "Hello Josephine"
8. "Sweet Little Sixteen" (Berry)
9. "C.C. Rider" (Traditional)
10. "What'd I Say" (Ray Charles)
11. "Good Rockin' Tonight" (Roy Brown)
