= Hot Damn! (Billy Lee Riley album) =

Studio album by Billy Lee Riley
- Released: May 13, 1997
- Recorded: 1997
- Studio: Sun Studios, Memphis, TN
- Genre: Blues, Country blues
- Length: 61:19
- Label: Capricorn
- Producer: Billy Lee Riley

Billy Lee Riley chronology
Rockin' Fifties (1995)	Hot Damn! (1997)	Shade Tree Blues (1999)

Professional ratings
Review scores
Source	Rating
Allmusic	3/5 stars

Hot Damn! is a 1997 blues album by Billy Lee Riley. The album was nominated for a Grammy.

== Track listing ==
All tracks composed by Billy Lee Riley; except where indicated

1. "Fine Little Mamma" – 2:10
2. "Winter Time Blues" – 4:36
3. "I'm Him" (Jerry West) – 3:14
4. "It Never Rains Till It Rains On You" (J. Kennedy) – 4:04
5. "Nothin' But The Devil" (West) – 3:58
6. "I'm Gonna Quit You Pretty Baby" (Silas Hogan, West) – 1:59
7. "Rock Me Baby" (B.B. King) – 4:41
8. "Take Me Back Baby" – 3:36
9. "Rainy Night In Georgia" (Tony Joe White) – 4:58
10. "Too Close Blues" (West) – 2:17
11. "Rainin' in My Heart" (James Moore, Jerry West) – 3:03
12. "Cause You Got a Little Money" (J. Kennedy) – 2:07
13. "Blues for My Baby" – 4:55
14. "How Come We All Ain't Got The Same" – 6:54
15. "You Gonna Miss Me" – 3:36
16. "Time Ain't On My Side" – 4:27

== Personnel ==
=== Musicians ===
- Billy Lee Riley – vocals, harmonica, rhythm guitar
- James Lott – lead guitar, rhythm guitar
- Ray Sanders – acoustic bass
- Pete Sully – drums

=== Technical ===
- Billy Lee Riley – producer
- James Lott – engineer
- John Neil Martin - 2nd audio engineer
- Diane Painter – art direction
- Craig Allen – design
- Bill Friskies-Warren – liner notes
