= High School Confidential (Jerry Lee Lewis song) =

Single by Jerry Lee Lewis and His Pumping Piano
- B-side: "Fools like Me"
- Released: May 20, 1958
- Genre: Rock and roll
- Length: 2:27
- Label: Sun 296
- Songwriters: Ron Hargrave; Jerry Lee Lewis
- Producer: Sam Phillips

Jerry Lee Lewis singles chronology
"Down the Line" (1958)	"High School Confidential" (1958)	"The Return of Jerry Lee" (1958)

"High School Confidential" is a 1958 song written by Jerry Lee Lewis and Ron Hargrave (and copyrighted in both their names on January 28, 1958) as the title song of the MGM movie of the same name directed by Jack Arnold.

== Background ==
Jerry Lee Lewis recorded the song at the Sun Studio on February 14, then went to California, where the director set him, his bass player Jay W. Brown, his road drummer Russ Smith, and their instruments on the top of a flatbed truck and had Lewis lip-synch the song to a crowd of fake high school kids. During this session Lewis recorded at least 14 takes of "High School Confidential" (no other songs were recorded), but at that time not a single take from this session was released. The takes from this session were officially released only in early 1980s: one take on Sun LP 1004 Wild One at the High School Hop (UK, 1982) and three takes on Charly Records 12-LP boxed set Jerry Lee Lewis: The Sun Years (UK, 1983). Lewis returned to this song on April 24, 1958, when he recorded three down tempo takes of it. The splice of two takes (3 and 1) from this session was released as the side A of the single Sun 296 in May 1958 (doubled by UK single by London Records HLS.8780 in January 1959), on EP Sun EPA 110 (UK RES.1187) and on the first self-titled album by Lewis, Sun LP-1230 (UK HAS.2138), all US releases in the same year 1958. The film version was never released.

The Sun Records picture sleeve for the 45 single featured cast members Diane Jergens, Russ Tamblyn, Jan Sterling, John Drew Barrymore, and Mamie Van Doren behind a superimposed image of Lewis.

Lewis recorded a live version of the song with the British band The Nashville Teens on the landmark 1964 live album Live at the Star Club, Hamburg, recognized as the single greatest album in history.

The song was performed by Lewis in the 1972 concert at Wembley Stadium in the UK and appeared in the 1973 documentary of the concert entitled The London Rock and Roll Show.

The song is featured in the 1983 film Breathless starring Richard Gere and Valerie Kaprisky.

"High School Confidential" was performed live on a 1983 Dick Clark TV special featuring Lewis on piano and vocals, Keith Richards on guitar, Mick Fleetwood on drums, and Gary Busey on vocals.

The song appeared in the 1989 Orion Pictures biopic Great Balls of Fire! in a new recording by Lewis. The song also appeared on the motion picture soundtrack album on Polydor Records.

== Chart performance ==
1958 Sun 7-inch 45 single, Sun 296.

The song was released on May 20, 1958 as a Sun single, Sun 296, backed with "Fools like Me" in 1958 and reached No. 21 on the Billboard Hot 100, No. 9 on the country chart, No. 5 on the R & B chart, and No. 12 on the British pop charts. The single reached No. 13 on the Canadian charts. The single was also certified Gold by the RIAA.

Chart (1958)	Peak position
U.S. Billboard Hot 100	21
U.S. Billboard Hot C&W Sellers	9
U.S. Billboard Hot R&B Sellers	5
U.K. Singles Chart	12
Canadian Singles Chart	13

== Album appearances ==
- Jerry Lee Lewis, Sun Records, 1958
- Live at the Star Club, Hamburg, German Philips, 1964
- Golden Hits of Jerry Lee Lewis, Smash, 1964
- Original Sun Greatest Hits, Rhino, 1983
- All Killer, No Filler: The Anthology, Rhino, 1993
- A Whole Lotta...Jerry Lee Lewis: The Definitive Retrospective, Salvo/Universal, 2012

== Notable recordings ==
- The Beatles performed and recorded the song live with Paul McCartney on vocals at the Get Back/Let It Be sessions in Twickenham Film studios on January 6 and 26, 1969.
- The song was also featured in the Jerry Lee Lewis biopic Great Balls of Fire! (1989).
- Both Adam Faith and Cliff Richard recorded the song in 1958.
- The Refreshments recorded the song in 2008 on their album Jukebox - Refreshing Classics.
- The song was also recorded by Johnny Worth, Mike Berry, Marty Wilde, Ol' 55, The Blasters, Johnny Hallyday, Brian Setzer, Sha Na Na, Fairport Convention on the album Moat on the Ledge: Live at Broughton Castle, August '81, Mike Smith, Alan Mills, and Siggi Fassl in 2011.
- Bruce Springsteen and the E Street Band occasionally performed the song live in concert in the late 1970s.
- Ian Gillan & The Javelins released the song on their 2018 album.

1958 sheet music cover.

== Sources ==
- Bonomo, Joe (2009). Jerry Lee Lewis: Lost and Found. New York: Continuum Books.
- Gutterman, Jimmy (1991). Rockin' My Life Away: Listening to Jerry Lee Lewis. Nashville: Rutledge Hill Press.
- Gutterman, Jimmy (1993). The Jerry Lee Lewis Anthology: All Killer, No Filler. Rhino Records.
- Silver, Murray (1981). Great Balls of Fire: The Uncensored Story of Jerry Lee Lewis. William Morrow/Quill/St. Martin's Press.
- Whitburn, Joel (1985). The Billboard Book of Top 40 Hits.
