= The Fools' Hall of Fame =

The Fools' Hall of Fame is the title of an American song. There has been more than one composition using this title.

== Versions ==
In 1957 the composition written by Danny Wolfe was recorded by Rudi Richardson on the Sun label in an R&B style. Shortly it was also recorded by both Roy Orbison and Johnny Cash on the same label, but not released. This song has become an early R&R classic mainly because of Roy's reissue, although it had never charted.

In 1959 Pat Boone recorded a different composition by Aaron Schroeder and Wally Gold, as a Pop ballad. It charted at #29 US.

In 1962 Paul Anka wrote a third composition which he released, an uptempo Pop song.
