= Fools like Me =

Single by Jerry Lee Lewis and His Pumping Piano

from the album Jerry Lee Lewis
- A-side: "High School Confidential" "Fools like Me"
- Released: May 1958
- Genre: Country, rock and roll
- Length: 2:27
- Label: Sun
- Songwriter(s): Jack Clement, Murphy "Pee Wee" Maddox
- Producer(s): Shelby Singleton

Jerry Lee Lewis singles chronology
"Lewis Boogie" / "The Return of Jerry Lee" (1958)	"High School Confidential" / "Fools like Me" (1958)	"Breathless" / "Down the Line" (1958)

"Fools like Me" is a song by Jerry Lee Lewis, who released it as a single, with "High School Confidential" on the other side, in 1958 on Sun Records.

According to Joe Bonomo's book Jerry Lee Lewis: Lost and Found, the song was a top-10 country hit.

== Track listing ==
7" single (Sun 296, 1958)
No.	Title	Length
1.	"High School Confidential"	2:27
2.	"Fools like Me"	2:48

== Charts ==
Chart (1958)	Peak position
U.S. Cash Box Country Singles	30

== Covers ==
Moon Mullican did a version of the song in the early 1960s.

The song was performed by The Beatles and by John Lennon with Yoko Ono.
