= How's My Ex Treating You =

- Scandinavian release picture sleeve

Single by Jerry Lee Lewis
- A-side: "How's My Ex Treating You" "Sweet Little Sixteen"
- Released: July 21, 1962
- Genre: Country
- Length: 2:35
- Label: Sun
- Songwriter: Vic McAlpin
- Producer: Jerry Kennedy

Jerry Lee Lewis singles chronology
"I've Been Twistin'" / "Ramblin' Rose" (1962)	"How's My Ex Treating You" / "Sweet Little Sixteen" (1962)	"Good Golly Miss Molly" / "I Can't Trust Me (in Your Arms Anymore)" (1962)

Audio
- "How's My Ex Treating You" on YouTube

"How's My Ex Treating You" is a song written by Vic McAlpin and originally recorded by Jerry Lee Lewis, who released it as a single, with "Sweet Little Sixteen" on the other side, in 1962 on Sun Records.

Hank Williams, Jr. released his version, sounding "very much like Lewis's without a flashy piano", in 1977 or early 1978.

== Background ==
The circumstances of writing this song as recalled by Vic McAlpin are described in the Roger M. Williams's book Sing a Sad Song: The Life of Hank Williams:

[McAlpin] was sitting in Linebaugh's restaurant, a country music hangout in Nashville, when singer-composer Roger Miller walked in. After exchanging hellos, McAlpin asked jokingly, "How's my ex-girl friend treatin' you?" "About like she's treatin' you," Miller replied.

"That really hit me," recalls McAlpin. "I jumped up, got a pencil, and wrote eight lines of a song based on that on a napkin. Then I turned the napkin over and over and wrote eight more. Jerry Lee Lewis recorded it, and it sold over a hundred thousand."

== Track listing ==
7" single (Sun 379, 1962)
No.	Title	Length
1.	"Sweet Little Sixteen"	2:52
2.	"How's My Ex Treating You"	2:35
