= Memphis Rock 'n' Soul Museum =

American music museum in Tennessee

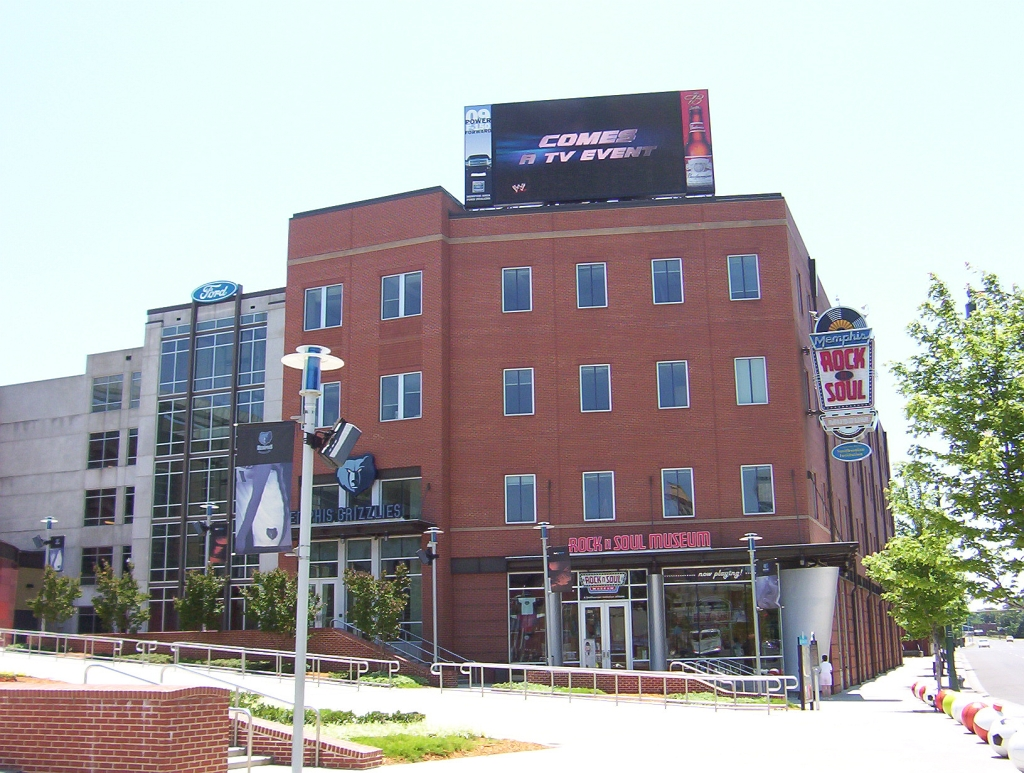
- Front of museum
- Established: 2000-04-29
- Location: Memphis, Tennessee
- Coordinates: 35.139466°N 90.051730°W
- Director: John Doyle
- Public transit access: MATA; Main Street Line; Riverfront Loop
- Website: http://www.memphisrocknsoul.org/

The Memphis Rock 'n' Soul Museum is a music museum located at 191 Beale Street in Memphis, Tennessee. The museum tells the critical story of the musical pioneers who overcame racial and socio-economic obstacles to create the music that changed the cultural complexion of the world.

== Collection and facilities ==
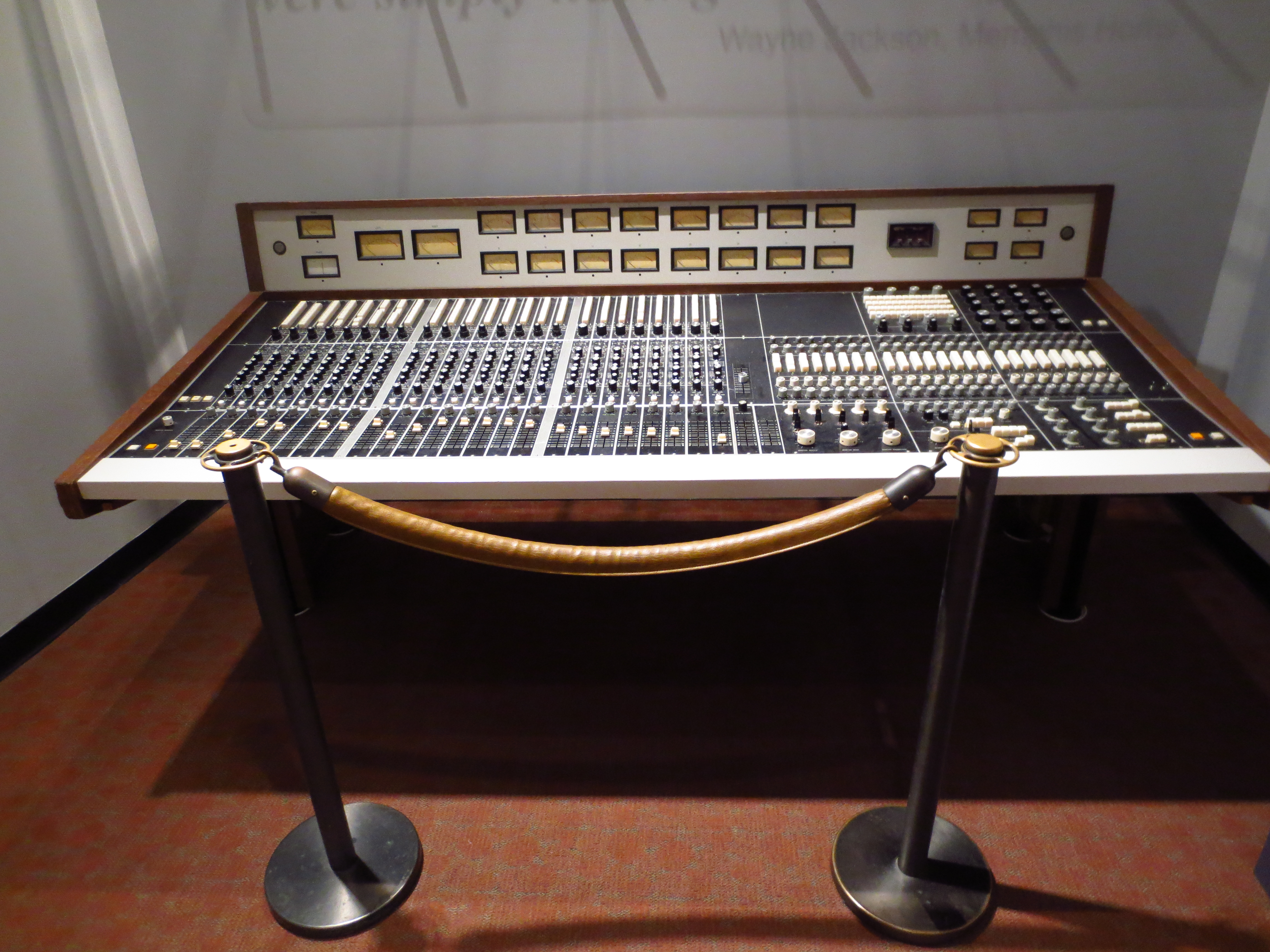
Ardent Studios mixing board

The museum offers a comprehensive Memphis music experience beginning with the rural field hollers and porch music of the sharecroppers in the 30s highlighting the urban influences of Beale Street in the 1940s, radio, Sun Records and Sam Phillips in the 1950s, the heyday of Stax, Hi Records and soul music in the 1960s and 1970s, the impact of the civil rights movement, and the music's influence and inspiration that continues today. The museum's MP3 audio guide is packed with over 300 minutes of information as well as over 100 songs recorded in and around Memphis from the 1930s-70s. The Memphis Rock ‘n’ Soul Museum also features three audio-visual programs, more than 30 instruments and 40 costumes in seven galleries.

== History ==
The museum began as a research project of the Smithsonian Institution to celebrate its 150th anniversary. The Smithsonian's first permanent exhibition outside Washington and New York, the museum opened on April 29, 2000, in the Gibson building. The museum moved to the FedExForum in autumn 2004.

== See also ==
- Memphis Music Hall of Fame
- List of museums in Tennessee
- List of music museums
