= Ron Hargrave =

American ukulele player and actor

- Born: November 8, 1929; Brooklyn, New York, U.S.
- Died: May 16, 2023 (aged 93); Camarillo, California, U.S.
- Other names: Ronald Hargrave, Johnny Deerfield
- Known for: Ukulele Player, Famous Songwriter for Jerry Lee Lewis
- Children: 1

Ronald Jay Hargrave (November 8, 1929 – May 16, 2023) was an American ukulele player and actor from the 1950s era, who has become an icon to the Rockabilly fan base. He co-wrote music for Jerry Lee Lewis and was also identified as a billboard star musician in Japan with many singles. He was a resident of Ventura, California where he enjoyed visiting small shops and locations to play the ukulele for small impromptu crowds.

== Biography ==
Ronald Jay Hargrave was born in Brooklyn, New York to Vaudeville performers directly after the big Wall Street crash of 1929. His family, trying to avert disaster, moved to Hollywood, California in 1936, where they settled and he began his lifelong career choices for the entertainment industry.

Hargrave entered into military life right at the start of his acting and musical career. During his military service time, he met up with the daughter of Lou Costello, who started him off in the film industry and got a record deal for him with MGM.

Hargrave moved to Ventura County, California, where he resided near his daughter and continued to play music for small clubs and small audiences. He often surprised the downtown shop and small restaurant owners with impromptu visits where he played his ukulele for passersby.

Hargrave died in Camarillo, California on May 16, 2023, at the age of 93.

== Career ==
Hargrave, after hanging out with Costello's daughter, met with Abbott and Costello and eventually was managed by Lou Costello in one film, Dance With Me Henry, released in 1956. He began writing songs and was introduced to Jerry Lee Lewis, with whom he co-wrote "High School Confidential", as well as writing "Latch On" and other movie songs.

Hargrave was also a boxer and his swagger in Costello's movie earmarked him as one of the first on-screen rock and roll actors, in an era that had not yet adjusted to the young attitude of Elvis Presley or Jerry Lee Lewis.
