= Jimmy Van Eaton =

American drummer (1937–2024)

- Also known as: J. M. Van Eaton
- Born: James Mack Van Eaton; December 23, 1937; Memphis, Tennessee, U.S.
- Died: February 9, 2024 (aged 86) Tuscumbia, Alabama, U.S.
- Genres: Rock and roll
- Occupations: Musician; songwriter; singer
- Instruments: Drums; vocals
- Years active: 1950s–1960s; 1970s–1990s
- Labels: Sun
- Formerly of: Jerry Lee Lewis; Billy Lee Riley; Conway Twitty

James Mack Van Eaton (December 23, 1937 – February 9, 2024), known as Jimmy Van Eaton or J. M. Van Eaton, was an American rock and roll drummer, singer and record producer, best known for his recordings as the drummer in sessions with Jerry Lee Lewis and others at Sun Records in the 1950s. Lewis referred to him as "The creative rock 'n' roll drummer".

== Life and career ==
Van Eaton was born in Memphis, Tennessee. He saved his pocket money to buy his first set of drums as a teenager. He formed his first band, the Jivin' Five, initially playing Dixieland jazz, before forming his first rock-and-roll band, the Echoes. They recorded a demo at Sun Studio with the engineer Jack Clement, who was impressed and recommended Van Eaton and the band's bass player, Marvin Pepper, to the singer Billy Lee Riley, who was forming a touring band, the Little Green Men.

Van Eaton remained a member of Riley's band, performing mainly on weekends. He also toured with Conway Twitty. During the week he worked as a session musician at Sun, becoming the studio's in-house drummer from 1956 to 1959 and performing on most of the label's rock-and-roll recordings. He featured notably contributed to records by Jerry Lee Lewis, such as "Whole Lotta Shakin' Goin' On", on which he regularly played with the guitarist Roland Janes. In addition to recordings by Lewis and Riley, Van Eaton performed on recordings by other Sun musicians, including Johnny Cash, Roy Orbison, Charlie Rich, Charlie Feathers, Bill Justis, and Ray Smith.

Van Eaton played on some recordings for other Memphis labels, but after moving to Philadelphia with Riley's band he married and drifted away from music in the 1960s. He worked in the vending machine business and later as an investment banker. He also led a gospel group, the Seekers, in the 1970s. He returned to rockabilly when he performed with the Sun Rhythm Section and worked again in the 1980s with Jerry Lee Lewis. In 1998, as J. M. Van Eaton, he released an album, The Beat Goes On, featuring his own songs and vocals In addition to drums. He died at his home in Tuscumbia, Alabama on February 9, 2024, at the age of 86.
