= Great Balls of Fire =

Single by Jerry Lee Lewis
- B-side: "You Win Again"
- Released: November 1957
- Recorded: October 8, 1957
- Studio: Sun Studio (Memphis, Tennessee)
- Genre: Rock and roll
- Length: 1:52
- Label: Sun 281
- Songwriters: Otis Blackwell; Jack Hammer
- Producer: Sam Phillips

Jerry Lee Lewis singles chronology
"Whole Lotta Shakin' Goin' On" (1957)	"Great Balls of Fire" (1957)	"You Win Again" (1957)

"Great Balls of Fire" is a 1957 popular song recorded by American rock and roll musician Jerry Lee Lewis on Sun Records and featured in the 1957 movie Jamboree. It was written by Otis Blackwell and Jack Hammer. The Jerry Lee Lewis 1957 recording was ranked as the 96th-greatest song ever by Rolling Stone. It is written in AABA form. It sold one million copies in its first 10 days of release in the United States, making it one of the best-selling singles at that time.

== Background and Composition ==
"Great Balls of Fire" is best known for Jerry Lee Lewis's original, which was recorded in the Sun Studio in Memphis, Tennessee, on October 8, 1957, using three personnel: Lewis (piano/vocals), Sidney Stokes (bass), and a session drummer, Larry Linn, instead of the usual Sun backups Jimmy Van Eaton (drums) and Roland Janes (guitar). Lewis was quoted in the book JLL: His Own Story by Rick Bragg, (pg 133), as saying "I knew Sidney Stokes, but I didn't know him that well either, and I don't know what happened to them people. That's the last time I ever seen 'em. That's strange isn't it?" It was released as a 45 rpm single on Sun 281 in November 1957. It reached number two on the Billboard pop charts, number three on the R&B charts, and number one on the country charts. It also reached number one on the UK Singles Chart, and appeared on the New Zealand Singles Chart and the Dutch top 40.

The song was featured in a performance by Jerry Lee Lewis and his band in the 1957 Warner Bros. rock and roll film Jamboree, which also featured Carl Perkins, Fats Domino, Buddy Knox, and Dick Clark. The recording was released in the UK on London Records.

The tune is the first song on the second side of Lewis's 1964 album Live at the Star Club, Hamburg.

== Chart performance ==
Chart (1957–1958)	Peak position
Netherlands (Dutch Top 40)	30
New Zealand (Recorded Music NZ)	8
UK Singles Chart (The Official Charts Company)	1
U.S. Billboard Hot Country Singles	1
U.S. Billboard Hot 100	2

== Certifications ==
Certifications for "Great Balls of Fire"
Region	Certification	Certified units/sales
New Zealand (RMNZ)	Gold	15,000^{‡}
^{‡} Sales+streaming figures based on certification alone.

== Legacy ==
- In 2017, WWE held a professional wrestling event titled Great Balls of Fire, referencing the song. Jerry Lawler's personal attorney, who also represents Jerry Lee Lewis, informed him that the singer had actually trademarked the phrase, prompting Lawler to inform them of this. He stated that he "put him in touch with the WWE people, gave him a name. Apparently, he called them and got everything worked out. Not only are they using the name, [but also] they are using Jerry Lee's song."
- Ric Flair revealed he started using his iconic "Wooo!" catchphrase in 1974 after he heard Jerry Lee Lewis sing the lyric, “Goodness gracious, great balls of fire, woo!”

In 1998, the 1957 recording of "Great Balls of Fire" by Jerry Lee Lewis on Sun Records was inducted into the Grammy Hall of Fame.

=== Top Gun franchise ===
In the 1986 film Top Gun, LTJG Nick "Goose" Bradshaw (portrayed by Anthony Edwards) plays the song in a bar with his family and Pete "Maverick" Mitchell (Tom Cruise). The song is available on the Top Gun soundtrack special edition released in 1999. The song is performed again in the sequel, the 2022 film Top Gun: Maverick by Goose's son LT Bradley "Rooster" Bradshaw (portrayed by Miles Teller). During the editing process, the song was found to evoke flashbacks of Goose’s death while Maverick watches from outside the hard deck bar.

Teller's performance is included on that film's soundtrack Top Gun: Maverick (Music from the Motion Picture), on which it is labeled as a live performance. Paramount Pictures later released the extended scene of Teller's performance as Rooster on YouTube on June 16, 2022.
