= Roland Janes =

American musician (1933–2013)

Roland E. Janes (August 20, 1933 – October 18, 2013) was an American rockabilly guitarist and record producer, who was active at Sun Records between 1956 and 1963.

== Biography ==
He was born in Brookings, Clay County, Arkansas, the second youngest in a family of seven, and grew up there and in St Louis, Missouri, where he lived with his mother after his parents divorced. He learned mandolin and guitar, and played in country bands with his cousins in Arkansas while working in the lumber industry. In 1953 he moved to Memphis, Tennessee, before enlisting in the U.S. Marine Corps during the Korean War. After his discharge, he returned to Memphis and began playing in clubs with pianist Doc McQueen, through whom he met guitarist and engineer Jack Clement. Clement introduced him to Sam Phillips at Sun Records, and Janes became a regular session guitarist there on records by Jerry Lee Lewis, Billy Lee Riley, Charlie Rich, Sonny Burgess and many others.

He played regularly on Sun record releases between 1956 and 1963, adding guitar that "was both surgically precise and wildly kinetic, perfectly complementing the delirious energy that galvanized Sun's most memorable contributions to the early days of rock & roll." Janes recorded as leader of his own group in 1959. He was also responsible for "nearly single-handedly invent[ing] many of the engineering methods used in modern recordings, from microphone placement and cabling to board and tape deck tricks." In 1960 Janes and Riley formed their own label, Rita Records, and had a hit with Harold Dorman's "Mountain of Love".

He left Sun in 1963 and opened his own studio, Sonic Recording Service, where he produced records by Jerry Jaye, Travis Wammack, and others. The studio closed in 1974, but in 1977 Janes returned to the music industry as a producer and engineer at the Sounds of Memphis recording studio, as well as a teacher of recording techniques. He began working with Sam Phillips again in 1982, at Phillips Recording, and continued as an active session musician, playing guitar on Mudhoney's 1998 album Tomorrow Hit Today.

He was elected to The Southern Legends Entertainment & Performing Arts Hall of Fame and the Memphis Music Hall of Fame. He died in 2013 at the age of 80, following a heart attack.
