= Ike Turner discography =

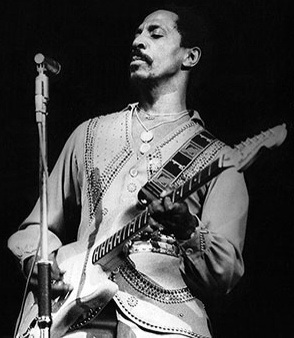
- Ike Turner performing in 1972
- Studio albums: 10
- Live albums: 2
- Compilation albums: +25
- Singles: +30

This article contains information about albums and singles released by American musician and bandleader Ike Turner.

== Overview ==
In March 1951, Ike Turner and his band the Kings of Rhythm entered Sam Phillips' Memphis Recording Service, where they recorded several songs including the No. 1 R&B hit often regarded as the first rock 'n' roll record, "Rocket 88," featuring Jackie Brenston on vocals with the band credited as the Delta Cats. The recordings were licensed to Chess Records.

As an A&R man in the early 1950s, Turner arranged for other artists, such as Howlin' Wolf, Elmore James, Roscoe Gordon, Bobby "Blue" Bland, Little Junior Parker and Little Milton, to record for Sun Records, Modern Records, and Modern's subsidiaries, including RPM Records.

As a session musician Turner contributed to many seminal blues records, including B.B. King's first two No. 1 singles "3 O'Clock Blues" and "You Know I Love You." Turner is featured on "Double Trouble" by Otis Rush and Albert King's first hit record, "Don't Throw Your Love on Me So Strong."

By 1954, Turner had made the transition from pianist to guitarist. He took his Kings of Rhythm to Cincinnati in 1956 to record for Federal Records. In 1959, Turner released two singles on Stevens Records under the anagram "Icky Renrut" because he was still under contract with Sun for several more months, and he didn't want to cause friction with Phillips.

After Turner formed the Ike & Tina Turner Revue in 1960, he created various labels such as Sputnik, Teena, Prann, Innis, Sony and Sonja Records to release singles he wrote and/or produced for other artists. In the late 1960s and early 1970s, Turner released albums and singles on Pompeii Records and United Artists.

After decades of absence, Turner released the critically claimed albums Here and Now (2001) and Risin' with the Blues (2006), the latter winning a Grammy award for Best Traditional Blues Album.

== Studio albums ==
- 1962: Dance with Ike & Tina Turner's Kings of Rhythm, Sue ST LP-2003
- 1963: Rocks The Blues, Crown CLP-5367/CST-367
- 1969: Ike Turner & The Kings of Rhythm: A Black Man's Soul, Pompeii SD-6003; reissue: Funky Delicacies DEL CD-0047 (2002)
- 1972: Strange Fruit, United Artists UAS-5560
- 1972: Blues Roots, United Artists UAS-5576
- 1973: Confined To Soul, United Artists UA-LA051-F
- 1973: Bad Dreams, United Artists UA-LA087-F
- 1980: The Edge (featuring Tina Turner and Home Grown Funk), Fantasy F-9597
- 1996: My Blues Country, Resurgent/Mystic MYSCD-115
- 1996: Without Love...I Have Nothing, C-Ya Records 63193 79654 23
- 2001: Here and Now, Ikon IKOCD-8850
- 2006: Risin' With The Blues, Zoho Roots ZM-200611

== Live albums ==
- 2002: Ike Turner's Kings Of Rhythm – The Resurrection: Live Montreux Jazz Festival, Isabel IS-640202
- 2006: Ike Turner & The Kings Of Rhythm – Live In Concert, Charly Films CHF-F1014LF [DVD/2CD]

== Selected compilations ==
- 1976: Sun – The Roots of Rock, Volume 3: Delta Rhythm Kings, Charly CR-30103
- 1976: I'm Tore Up, Red Lightnin' RL-0016
- 1981: Kings of Rhythm, Flyright FLY LP-578
- 1984: Hey Hey, Red Lightin' RL-0047 [2LP]
- 1990: Cobra Sessions 1958, P-Vine PCD-2161
- 1991: Trailblazer, Charly R&B CD-CHARLY-263
- 1993: Rocks the Blues, P-Vine PCD-3031/2 [2CD expanded 44 track edition]
- 1994: I Like Ike! The Best of Ike Turner, Rhino R2-71819
- 1995: Rhythm Rockin' Blues, Ace CDCHD-553
- 2000: Ike's Instrumentals (1954–1965), Ace CDCHD-782
- 2001: The Sun Sessions, Varèse Sarabande 302 066 232 2
- 2003: Ike Turner (Blues Kingpins Series), Virgin/EMI 82714
- 2004: His Woman, Her Man: The Ike Turner Diaries — Unreleased Funk/Rock 1970–1973, Funky Delicacies DEL CD-0045
- 2004: The Bad Man: Rare & Unreissued Ike Turner Produced Recordings 1962–1965, Night Train International NTICD-7139
- 2004: King Cobra: The Chicago Sessions, Fuel 2000 302 061 390 2
- 2004: A Proper Introduction to Ike Turner/Jackie Brenston, Proper Intro CD-2048
- 2006: The Chronological Ike Turner 1951–1954, Classics (Blues & Rhythm Series) 5176
- 2006: Early Times, Rev-Ola CRREV-173
- 2008: Classic Early Sides 1952–1957, JSP 4203 [2CD]
- 2011: Rocket 88: The Original 1951–1960 R&B and Rock & Roll Sides, Soul Jam 600803
- 2011: That Kat Sure Could Play! (The Singles 1951 To 1957), Secret SECBX-025 [4CD]
- 2011: Jack Rabbit Blues: The Singles of 1958–1960, Secret SECSP-041
- 2012: Trouble Up the Road (The 1961 Recordings), Secret SECCD-060
- 2012: Real Gone Rocket: Session Man Extraordinaire: Selected Singles 1951–59, Jerome JRCD-002
- 2012: Ike Turner Studio Productions: New Orleans and Los Angeles 1963–1965, Ace CDCHD-1329
- 2017: She Made My Blood Run Cold, Southern Routes SR-CD-3502
- 2017: Sessionography, Vol. 1, Real Gone Music RGMCD-300
- 2018: Ike Turner and the Kings of Rhythm: Trailblazin' the Blues 1951–1957, Jasmine JASMCD-3130

== Singles ==
=== 1950s ===
Single (A-side, B-side)	Release date	Label & Cat No.	Artist	Notes
"Heartbroken and Worried" b/w "I'm Lonesome Baby"	Apr 1951	Chess 1459	Ike Turner and his Kings of Rhythm	Recorded March 5, 1951 in Memphis, Tennessee
"You're Drivin' Me Insane" b/w "Trouble and Heartaches"	May 1952	RPM 356	Ike Turner with Ben Burton's Orchestra	Recorded in Greenville, Mississippi Billboard review (May 31, 1952)
"Looking for My Baby" b/w "My Heart Belongs To You"	Aug 1952	RPM 362	Bonnie and Ike Turner with Orchestra	Recorded in Clarksdale, Mississippi Billboard review (Aug 30, 1952)
"Love Is Scarce" b/w "The Way You Used To Treat Me"	May 1954	RPM 409	Lover Boy (alias for Ike Turner)	
"Cubano Jump" b/w "Loosely"	May 1954	Flair 1040	Ike Turner & His Orchestra	Billboard review (May 29, 1954)
"Cuban Getaway" b/w "Go To It"	1955	Flair 1059	Ike Turner & His Orchestra	
"The World Is Yours" b/w "Suffocate"	1955	RPM 443	Johnny Wright, Ike Turner's Orchestra	Recorded in Los Angeles, CA
"As Long As I Have You" b/w "I Wanna Make Love To You"	Jan 1956	RPM 446	The Trojans, Ike Turner & Orchestra	Recorded in Los Angeles, CA Billboard review (January 14, 1956)
"I'm Tore Up" b/w "If I Never Had Known You"	Apr 1956	Federal 12265	Billy Gayles with Ike Turner's Rhythm Rockers	Billboard review (Apr 23, 1956)
"Do Right Baby" b/w "No Coming Back"	Nov 1956	Federal 12282	Billy Gayles with Ike Turner's Kings of Rhythm	Billboard review (Nov 3, 1956)
"What Can It Be" b/w "Gonna Wait For My Chance"	Nov 1956	Federal 12283	Jackie Brenston with Ike Turner's Kings of Rhythm	Billboard review (Nov 3, 1956)
"Peg Leg Woman" b/w "Mistreating Me"	1956	Vita V-123	Willie King with the Ike Turner Band	Willie King is Billy Gayles
"Just One More Time" b/w "Sad As A Man Can Be"	Jan 1957	Federal 12287	Billy Gayles with Ike Turner's Kings of Rhythm	Billboard review (Jan 3, 1957)
"Much Later" b/w "The Mistreater"	Feb 1957	Federal 12291	Jackie Brenston with Ike Turner's Kings of Rhythm	
"Do You Mean It" b/w "She Made My Blood Run Cold"	May 1957	Federal 12297	Ike Turner & His Orchestra	Billboard review (May 20, 1957)
"Rock-A-Bucket" b/w "The Big Question"	Aug 1957	Federal 12304	Ike Turner & His Orchestra	Billboard review (Aug 5, 1957)
"You've Changed My Love" b/w "Trail Blazer"	Nov 1957	Federal 12307	Ike Turner & His Orchestra	Billboard review (Nov 4, 1957)
"Boxtop" b/w "Chalypso Love Cry"	Aug 1958	Tune Town 501	Ike Turner, Carlson Oliver & Little Ann	Tina Turner's first recording
"(I Know) You Don't Love Me" b/w "Down & Out"	Apr 1959	Artistic 1504	Ike Turner's Kings of Rhythm	Vocal by Tommy Hodge Cash Box review (April 4, 1959)
"Jack Rabbit" b/w "In Your Eyes Baby"	1959	Stevens 104	Icky Renrut (alias for Ike Turner)	Vocal by Jimmy Thomas
"Walking Down The Aisle" b/w "Box Top"	July 1959	Cobra 5033	Ike Turner's Kings of Rhythm	Billboard review (Jul 20, 1959)
"Hey – Hey" b/w "Ho – Ho"	1959	Stevens 107	Icky Renrut (alias for Ike Turner)	Vocal by Jimmy Thomas Billboard review (Sep 7, 1959)
"My Love" b/w "That's All I Need"	Nov 1959	Sue 722	Ike Turner's Kings of Rhythm	

=== 1960s ===
Single (A-side, B-side)	Release date	Label & Cat No.	Artist	Notes
"Crackerjack" b/w "Gettin' Late"	Sep 1961	Crackerjack 4000	Ike Turner's Kings of Rhythm	
"She Made My Blood Run Cold" b/w "(Do You Think That I Should Change) The Big Question"	Oct 1961	King 5553	Ike Turner	Reissue of Federal 12297/B-side and Federal 12304/A-side Billboard review (Oct 23, 1961)
"Prancing" b/w "It's Gonna Work Out Fine"	Mar 1962	Sue 760	Ike & Tina's Kings of Rhythm	Billboard single advertisement (March 24, 1962)
"Drifting" b/w "Love You Baby"	Apr 1962	Kent 378	Bobby "Blue" Bland, Ike Turner and his Orchestra	Billboard review (April 28, 1962)
"What I Say" b/w "Ya ya"	Mar 1963	Prann 5001	Little Bones (alias for Ike Turner)	Cash Box review (March 9, 1963) Billboard review (March 9, 1963)
"You Can't Have Your Cake (And Eat It Too)" b/w "The Drag"	Feb 1964	Innis 3002	Ike & Dee Dee Johnson	Billboard review (February 15, 1964)
"Getting Nasty" b/w "Nutting Up"	1964	Sonja 5001	Nasty Minds (alias for Ike Turner & the Kings of Rhythm)	
"(I Know) You Don't Love Me" b/w "I'm on Your Trail"	Mar 1965	Royal American 105	Ike Turner & His Orchestra	Recorded circa 1958 Reissued on the CD I Like Ike! The Best of Ike Turner
"The New Breed (Pt. 1)" b/w "The New Breed (Pt. 2)"	Dec 1965	Sue 138	Ike Turner & His Kings Of Rhythm	Cash Box review (December 25, 1965)
"Everythings-Everything Part I" b/w "Everythings-Everything Part II"	1969	Pompeii 7001	Ike Turner and the Soul Seven	
"Thinking Black" b/w "Black Angel"	1969	Sterling Award 100	Ike Turner	Single from the album A Black Man's Soul

=== 1970s–1980s ===
Single (A-side, B-side)	Release date	Label & Cat No.	Artist	Album	Notes
"Love Is A Game" b/w "Takin' Back My Name"	Sep 1970	Liberty 56194	Ike Turner	Non-album tracks	
"River Deep – Mountain High" b/w "Na Na"	Nov 1971	United Artists 50865	Ike Turner	Non-album tracks	
"Right On" b/w "Tacks In My Shoes"	Apr 1972	United Artists 50900	Ike Turner	Blues Roots	Billboard Pick Singles (April 22, 1971)
"Soppin' Molasses" b/w "Bootie Lip"	1972	United Artists 50901	Family Vibes	Strange Fruit	Recorded at Bolic Sound in October 1971
"Lawdy Miss Clawdy" b/w "Tacks in My Shoes"	1972	United Artists 50930	Ike Turner	Blues Roots	
"Dust My Broom" b/w "You Won't Let Me Go"	Dec 1972	United Artists 51102	Ike Turner	Blues Roots	
"Garbage Man" b/w "El Burrito"	1973	United Artists UA-XW278-W	Family Vibes	Confined To Soul	Recorded at Bolic Sound in February 1973
"Father Alone" b/w "Take My Hand, Precious Lord"	Jul 1974	United Artists XW460	Ike Turner	The Gospel According to Ike & Tina	Nominated for a Grammy Award Billboard Top Single Picks
"Party Vibes" b/w "Shame, Shame, Shame"	1980	Fantasy D-161	Ike Turner Feat. Tina Turner & Home Grown Funk	The Edge	Reached No. 27 on Billboard Disco Top 100

== Uncredited recordings ==
Title	Release date	Artist	Label & Cat No.	US R&B	Notes
"Rocket 88"	Apr 1951	Jackie Brenston & His Delta Cats	Chess 1458	1	Recorded by Ike Turner & the Kings of Rhythm Recorded at Memphis Recording Service in March 1951
"Come Back To Where You Belong"	Apr 1951	Jackie Brenston & His Delta Cats	Chess 1458	—	Recorded by Ike Turner & the Kings of Rhythm Recorded at Memphis Recording Service in March 1951
"My Real Gone Rocket"	Oct 1951	Jackie Brenston & His Delta Cats	Chess 1469	—	Recorded by Ike Turner & the Kings of Rhythm Recorded at Memphis Recording Service in March 1951
"Tuckered Out"	Oct 1951	Jackie Brenston & His Delta Cats	Chess 1469	—	Recorded by Ike Turner & the Kings of Rhythm Recorded at Memphis Recording Service in March 1951
"Canton, Mississippi Breakdown"	Sep 1970	Elmore James	Kent LP 9901	—	Ike on lead guitar, credited to Elmore James

== Recordings as a sideman ==
=== Albums ===
Howlin Wolf

- 1962: Howling Wolf Sings the Blues (Crown CLP 5240)
- 1971: Going Back Home (Syndicate Chapter)

Albert King

- 1962: The Big Blues (King)

Earl Hooker

- 1969: Sweet Black Angel (Blue Thumb)

Sly and the Family Stone

- 1971: There's a Riot Goin' On

Otis Rush

- 2000: The Essential Otis Rush: The Classic Cobra Recordings 1956–1958 (Fuel 2000)

Gorillaz

- 2005: Demon Days (Virgin)

Bobby "Blue" Bland

- 2011: It's My Life, Baby: The Singles As & Bs 1951–1960 (Jasmine)

Other appearances

- 2003: The Modern Downhome Blues Sessions, Volume 1: Arkansas & Mississippi (Ace CDCHD 876)
- 2003: The Modern Downhome Blues Sessions, Volume 2: Mississippi & Arkansas 1952 (Ace CDCHD 982)

=== Singles ===
==== Howlin' Wolf ====
Title	Release date	Label & Cat No.	US R&B	Contribution	Notes
"Moanin' At Midnight"	Aug 1951	Chess 1479	10	Piano	Recorded at Memphis Recording Service in Memphis, Tennessee
"How Many More Years"	Aug 1951	Chess 1479	4	Piano	Recorded at Memphis Recording Service in Memphis, Tennessee
"Riding In the Moonlight"	Sep 1951	RPM 333	—	Piano	Recorded at KWEM in West Memphis, Arkansas
"Morning At Midnight"	Sep 1951	RPM 333	—	Piano	Recorded at KWEM in West Memphis, Arkansas
"Passing By Blues"	Nov 1951	RPM 340	—	Piano	Recorded at KWEM in West Memphis, Arkansas
"Crying At Daybreak"	Nov 1951	RPM 340	—	Piano	Recorded at KWEM in West Memphis, Arkansas
"My Baby Stole Off"	Jan 1952	RPM 347	—	Piano	Recorded at KWEM in West Memphis, Arkansas
"I Want Your Picture"	Jan 1952	RPM 347	—	Piano	Recorded at KWEM in West Memphis, Arkansas
"The Wolf Is At Your Door"	Jan 1952	Chess 1497	—	Piano	Recorded at Memphis Recording Service in Memphis, Tennessee
"Howlin' Wolf Boogie"	Jan 1952	Chess 1497	—	Piano	Recorded at Memphis Recording Service in Memphis, Tennessee
"Saddle My Pony"	Jul 1952	Chess 1515	—	Piano	Recorded at Memphis Recording Service in Memphis, Tennessee
"Worried All The Time"	Jul 1952	Chess 1515	—	Piano	Recorded at Memphis Recording Service in Memphis, Tennessee
"Oh, Red"	Jan 1953	Chess 1528	—	Piano	Recorded at Memphis Recording Service in Memphis, Tennessee
"My Last Affair"	Jan 1953	Chess 1528	—	Piano	Recorded at Memphis Recording Service in Memphis, Tennessee

==== Bobby "Blue" Bland ====
Title	Release date	Label & Cat No.	Contribution
"Crying All Night Long"	Dec 1951	Modern 848	Piano
"Dry Up Baby"	Dec 1951	Modern 848	Piano
"Good Lovin'"	June 1952	Modern 868	Piano
"Drifting from Town to Town"	June 1952	Modern 868	Piano

==== B.B. King ====
Title	Release date	Label & Cat No.	US R&B	Contribution
"3 O'Clock Blues"	Dec 1951	RPM 339	1	Piano
"Shake It Up And Go"	1952	RPM 355	—	Piano
"You Know I Love You"	Sep 1952	RPM 363	1	Piano
"You Didn’t Want Me"	Sep 1952	RPM 363	—	Piano
"Story From My Heart And Soul"	Dec 1952	RPM 374	9	Piano
"Boogie Woogie Woman"	Dec 1952	RPM 374	—	Piano

==== Roscoe Gordon ====
Title	Release date	Label & Cat No.	US R&B	Contribution
"No More Doggin'"	Mar 1952	RPM 350	2	Piano
"Maria"	Mar 1952	RPM 350	—	Piano

==== Boyd Gilmore ====
Title	Release date	Label & Cat No.	Contribution
"Ramblin' On My Mind"	Mar 1952	Modern 860	Piano
"All In My Dreams"	1952	Modern 872	Piano
"Take A Little Walk With Me"	1952	Modern 872	Piano

==== Little Junior Parker ====
Title	Release date	Label & Cat No.	Contribution
"Bad Women, Bad Whiskey"	Apr 1952	Modern 864	Piano
"You're My Angel"	Apr 1952	Modern 864	Piano

==== Houston Boines ====
Title	Release date	Label & Cat No.	Contribution	Notes
"Superintendent Blues"	Aug 1952	RPM 364	Piano	Recorded in Greenville, Mississippi, ca. January 23, 1952
"Monkey Motion"	Aug 1952	RPM 364	Piano	Recorded in Greenville, Mississippi, ca. January 23, 1952
"Going Home"	1952	Blues & Rhythm 7001	Piano	Recorded in Greenville, Mississippi, ca. January 23, 1952
"Relation Blues"	1952	Blues & Rhythm 7001	Piano	Recorded in Greenville, Mississippi, ca. January 23, 1952
"Operator Blues"	Unissued	Unissued	Piano	Recorded in Greenville, Mississippi, ca. January 23, 1952
"G-Man Blues"	Unissued	Unissued	Piano	Recorded in Greenville, Mississippi, ca. January 23, 1952
"Carry My Business On"	Unissued	Unissued	Piano	Recorded at Sun Studio on December 23, 1953
"Standing In The Courthouse Crying"	Unissued	Unissued	Piano	Recorded at Sun Studio on December 23, 1953

==== Charley Booker ====
Title	Release date	Label & Cat No.	Contribution	Notes
"Rabbit Blues"	1952	Blues & Rhythm 7003	Piano	Recorded in Greenville, Mississippi, ca. January 23, 1952
"No Ridin' Blues"	1952	Blues & Rhythm 7003	Piano	Recorded in Greenville, Mississippi, ca. January 23, 1952
"Moonrise Blues"	1952	Modern 878	Piano	Recorded in Greenville, Mississippi, ca. January 23, 1952
"Charley's Boogie Woogie"	1952	Modern 878	Piano	Recorded in Greenville, Mississippi, ca. January 23, 1952

==== Drifting Slim ====
Title	Release date	Label & Cat No.	Contribution	Notes
"Good Morning Baby"	Oct 1952	RPM 370	Piano	Recorded in North Little Rock, Arkansas
"My Sweet Woman"	Oct 1952	RPM 370	Piano	Recorded in North Little Rock, Arkansas

==== The Prisonaires ====
Title	Release date	Label & Cat No.	Contribution
"My Gold Is Real"	Jul 1953	Sun 989	Piano
Softly And Tenderly	Jul 1953	Sun 989	Piano

==== Johnny Ace / Earl Forrest ====
Title	Artist	Release date	Label & Cat No.	Contribution
"Midnight Hours Journey"	Johnny Ace	Sep 1953	Flair 1015	Piano
"Trouble and Me"	Earl Forrest	Sep 1953	Flair 1015	Piano

==== Elmore James ====
Title	Release date	Label & Cat No.	Contribution	Notes
"Please Find My Baby"	Dec 1953	Flair 1022	Piano	Possibly recorded on January 25, 1952 in Canton, Mississippi
"Strange Kinda' Feeling"	Dec 1953	Flair 1022	Piano	Possibly recorded on January 25, 1952 in Canton, Mississippi
"Hand In Hand"	Mar 1954	Flair 1031	Piano	Possibly recorded on January 25, 1952 in Canton, Mississippi
"Make My Dreams Come True"	Mar 1954	Flair 1031	Piano	Possibly recorded on January 25, 1952 in Canton, Mississippi
"Sho Nuff I Do"	May 1954	Flair 1039	Guitar	Recorded on April 5, 1954 in Chicago, Illinois
"1839 Blues"	May 1954	Flair 1039	Guitar	Recorded on April 5, 1954 in Chicago, Illinois
"Rock My Baby Right"	1954	Flair 1048	Piano	Recorded on January 25, 1952 in Canton, Mississippi
"Dark And Dreary"	1954	Flair 1048	Piano	Recorded on January 25, 1952 in Canton, Mississippi

==== Little Milton ====
Title	Release date	Label & Cat No.	Contribution	Notes
"Beggin' My Baby"	Dec 1953	Sun 194	Piano	Recorded on July 28, 1953 at Sun Studio
"Somebody Told Me"	Dec 1953	Sun 194	Piano	Recorded on July 28, 1953 at Sun Studio
"If You Love Me"	Apr 1954	Sun 200	Piano	Recorded on March 30, 1954 at Sun Studio
"Alone And Blue"	Apr 1954	Sun 200	Piano	Recorded on March 30, 1954 at Sun Studio
"Homesick For My Baby"	Jun 1955	Sun 220	Piano	Recorded on March 30, 1954 at Sun Studio
"Lookin' For My Baby"	Jun 1955	Sun 220	Piano	Recorded on March 30, 1954 at Sun Studio

==== Billy "The Kid" Emerson ====
Title	Release date	Label & Cat No.	Contribution	Notes
"No Teasing Around"	Feb 1954	Sun 195	Guitar	Recorded on January 11, 1954 at Sun Studio
"If Lovin' Is Believing"	Feb 1954	Sun 195	Guitar	Recorded on January 11, 1954 at Sun Studio
"I'm Not Going Home"	May 1954	Sun 203	Guitar	Recorded on April 12, 1954 at Sun Studio
"The Woodchuck"	May 1954	Sun 203	Guitar	Recorded on April 12, 1954 at Sun Studio

==== Raymond Hill ====
Title	Release date	Label & Cat No.	Contribution	Notes
"Bourbon Street Jump"	May 1954	Sun 204	Guitar	Recorded on April 12, 1954 at Sun Studio
"The Snuggle"	May 1954	Sun 204	Guitar	Recorded on April 12, 1954 at Sun Studio

==== Clayton Love ====
Title	Release date	Label & Cat No.	Contribution
"Wicked Little Baby"	May 1954	Modern 929	Guitar Producer
"Why Don't You Believe in Me"	May 1954	Modern 929	Guitar Producer
"Mary Lou"	Aug 1956	Groove 0162	Guitar Producer
"Bye Bye Baby"	Aug 1956	Groove 0162	Guitar Producer

==== Dennis Binder ====
Title	Release date	Label & Cat No.	Contribution
"I Miss You So"	1954	Modern 930	Songwriter Producer Piano
"Early Time"	1954	Modern 930	Guitar Producer

==== The Flairs ====
Title	Release date	Label & Cat No.	Contribution
"Baby Wants"	1954	Flair 1041	Guitar
"You Were Untrue"	1954	Flair 1041	Guitar

==== Richard Berry ====
Title	Release date	Label & Cat No.	Contribution
"Rockin' Man"	Dec 1955	RPM 448	Guitar
"Big John"	Dec 1955	RPM 448	Songwriter Guitar

==== The Gardenias ====
Title	Release date	Label & Cat No.	Contribution	Notes
"Flaming Love"	Nov 1956	Federal 12284	Guitar	Recorded on September 13, 1956 in Cincinnati
"My Baby's Tops"	Nov 1956	Federal 12284	Guitar	Recorded on September 13, 1956 in Cincinnati

==== Otis Rush ====
Title	Release date	Label & Cat No.	Contribution	Notes
"Double Trouble"	Feb 1959	Cobra 5030	Guitar	Recorded in Chicago, Illinois in 1958
"Keep On Loving Me Baby"	Feb 1959	Cobra 5030	Guitar	Recorded in Chicago, Illinois in 1958
"All Your Love (I Miss Loving)"	Jul 1959	Cobra 5032	Guitar	Recorded in Chicago, Illinois in 1958
"My Baby's A Good'Un"	Jul 1959	Cobra 5032	Guitar	Recorded in Chicago, Illinois in 1958

==== Buddy Guy ====
Title	Release date	Label & Cat No.	Contribution
"You Sure Can't Do"	Mar 1959	Artistic 1503	Guitar
"This Is The End"	Mar 1959	Artistic 1503	Guitar Songwriter

==== Albert King ====
Title	Release date	Label & Cat No.	US R&B	Contribution
"Don't Throw Your Love on Me So Strong"	Nov 1961	King 5575	14	Piano
