= Johnny O'Neal (singer) =

American R&B singer

Johnny O'Neal was an American R&B singer best known as a member of Ike Turner's Kings of Rhythm. He also sang with blues guitarist Earl Hooker. O'Neal used various pseudonyms such as Brother Bell, Burntface Brother, and Scarface Johnny. As a solo artist he recorded for King Records and Sun Records in the 1950s. He also formed his own group called Johnny O'Neal and the Hound Dogs.

== Career ==
Born Johnny O'Neal Johnson, he became the lead singer of Ike Turner's band the Kings of Rhythm. Prior to the band recording "Rocket 88" (1951), O'Neal left the band to sign a solo contract with King Records. In January 1951, he recorded his debut "War Bound Blues" / "Ruth Ann" in Cincinnati which was released in March. His next single "Friday Night Blues" / "Blues About Baby" was released later that year.

In January 1952, O'Neal collaborated with Turner to record for the Bihari brothers in Greenville, Mississippi. Backed by the members of kings of Rhythm which included Turner on piano and Raymond Hill on tenor saxophone, O'Neal recorded the sides "If You Feel Froggish" / "Whole Heap Of Mama" released on Saul Bihari's Blues & Rhythm label.

Around that time, Turner had disbanded the Kings of Rhythm for a while. He took O'Neal and his wife Bonnie Turner to work in Sarasota, Florida with Earl Hooker and Pinetop Perkins. After the gigs, O'Neal and Hooker decided to stay around Florida longer. They put together a band with Roosevelt Wardell (piano), Ed Wiley (saxophone), Robert Dixon (bass), and Will Cochran (drums). They played various hot spots, including the Palms' Club in Bradenton, the Drive In in Sarasota, the Manhattan, the Elks Club, and the Roseland in St. Petersburg. On November 26, 1952, They recorded for King Records in Brandenton, Florida, resulting in the single "Johnny Feels The Blues" / "So Many Hard," released in 1953.

In August 1953, Turner brought O'Neal to Sun Studios in Memphis to record for Sam Phillips at Sun Records. Backed by Turner on guitar, James Wheeler (saxophone), Thomas Reed (saxophone), Willie "Bad Boy" Sims (drums), Turner's wife Bonnie Turner (piano), and Turner's nephew Jesse Knight (bass guitar), O'Neal recorded four sides: "Dead Letter Blues," "Nightmare (Johnny's Dream)," "Ugly Woman," and Peg Leg Baby." These remained unissued for decades until they were released on various compilations.

O'Neal and Turner had some friction, so therefore, Turner married O'Neal's girlfriend Alice because he "didn't want to be locking heads with him." He figured if he married her, O'Neal "couldn't do nothing." By 1954, Turner hired singer Billy Gayles and O'Neal left the band soon after. O'Neal later formed his own band, Johnny O'Neal and the Hound Dogs, which consisted of Earl Hooker, Pinetop Perkins, Willie Kizart, Willie "Bad Boy" Sims, and Johnny Floyd Smith. Singer Andrew Odom later joined his band.

== Discography ==
=== Singles ===
- 1951: Johnny O'Neal – "War Bound Blues" / "Ruth Ann" (King 4441)
- 1951: Johnny O'Neal – "Friday Night Blues" / "Blues About Baby" (King 4452)
- 1952: Brother Bell – "If You Feel Froggish" / "Whole Heap Of Mama" (Blues & Rhythm 7002)
- 1953: Johnny O'Neal with Orchestra – "Johnny Feels The Blues" / "So Many Hard" (King 4599)

=== Album appearances ===
- 1976: Sun: The Roots Of Rock: Volume 3: Delta Rhythm Kings (Charly Records)
- 1984: Sun Records: The Blues Years 1950-1956 (Sun Records)
- 2001: The Kings of Rhythm featuring Ike Turner – The Sun Sessions (Varèse Sarabande)
- 2006: Ike Turner & His Kings Of Rhythm – Early Times (Rev-Ola Records)
- 2011: Ike Turner – That Kat Sure Could Play!: The Singles 1951 To 1957 (Secret Records)
- 2013: The Sun Blues Box (Bear Family Records)
