= The Sun Sessions (Ike Turner's Kings of Rhythm album) =

Compilation album by Ike Turner & the Kings of Rhythm
- Released: June 26, 2001
- Recorded: March 5, 1951–1958
- Studio: Memphis Recording Service/Sun Studio
- Length: 54:34
- Label: Varèse Sarabande
- Producers: Cary E. Mansfield, Bill Dahl

Ike Turner & the Kings of Rhythm chronology
Here and Now (2001)	The Sun Sessions (2001)	His Woman, Her Man: The Ike Turner Diaries (2004)

The Sun Sessions is a collection of early recordings that musician Ike Turner and his band the Kings of Rhythm recorded from 1951–1958 for Sun Records. Many of the recordings were previously unissued until Charly Records released the album Sun: The Roots Of Rock: Volume 3: Delta Rhythm Kings in 1976. The tracks on The Sun Sessions were digitally remastered and released by Varèse Sarabande in 2001.

== Recording ==
In March 1951, Ike Turner and his Kings of Rhythm recorded at producer Sam Phillips' Memphis Recording Service. Phillips licensed the recordings to Chess Records. The first single, "Rocket 88," was supposed to be credited to Ike Turner and the Kings of Rhythm featuring Jackie Brenston. Instead, Jackie Brenston and his Delta Cats was printed; Turner blamed Phillips for this error. Jackie Brenston was a saxophonist and vocalist in Turner's band. It became a hit, reaching number one on the Billboard R&B chart. The success of the record caused friction between Turner and Phillips, and within the group as well since Brenston was the only member given credit. Soon after, the Kings of Rhythm briefly disbanded before Turner reformed the group with a new line-up. Subsequently, the success of the record helped Phillips launch the Sun Records label in 1952.

Around this time Turner became a session musician and production assistant for Philips. He was also a freelance talent scout, bringing blues musicians such as Howlin Wolf and Little Milton to record for Phillips.

In 1952, Marion Louis Lee joined the Kings of Rhythm as a vocalist and pianist; they married later that year. She recorded with Turner's band until 1953 under the aliases Mary Sue and Bonnie Turner.

In 1953, Turner recommenced his relationship with Phillips by bringing new talent to record for Sun. One of those was vocalist Johnny O'Neal. Prior to "Rocket 88," O'Neal had been in an earlier incarnation of the Kings of Rhythm, but he had left the band to sign a solo contract with King Records.

Turner discovered vocalist and pianist Billy "The Kid" Emerson during Emerson's stint in the Air Force stationed in Greenville, MS. Emerson occasionally performed with the Kings of Rhythm. Turner brought him to record at Sun Records in 1954 and played guitar on his recordings.

Raymond Hill was a childhood friend of Turner's, they were both members of the Tophatters which morphed into the Kings of Rhythm. Hill played tenor saxophone on "Rocket 88." They had a falling out soon after the record was released, but Hill eventually returned to Turner's band. Hill later had a relationship with Turner's vocalist Little Ann (Tina Turner) and fathered her firstborn in 1958.

Turner last recorded at Sun in 1958 with vocalist Tommy Hodge. By that time Phillips had shifted his priorities to recording rockabilly music.

== Critical reception ==
Professional ratings
Review scores
Source	Rating
Allmusic	4.5/5 stars

Reviewing The Sun Sessions for AllMusic, Bruce Eder wrote:

The best track on the album is arguably "Ugly Woman," one of the funniest songs in Turner's output and one that shows off the bandleader/guitarist/singer Johnny O'Neal working on all cylinders in overdrive. Tommy Hodge is the most consistent singer here, though the disc is also worth hearing for Bonnie Turner's work — whatever their other attributes, Turner evidently did choose the women around him at least partly on the basis of their vocal skills.

== Track listing ==
No.	Title	Writer(s)	Recorded/Released	Length
1.	"Get It Over Baby" (Ike Turner & the Kings of Rhythm with Tommy Hodge)	Ike Turner	1958/1976	2:03
2.	"Dead Letter Blues" (Johnny O'Neal)	Johnny O'Neal Johnson	August 2, 1953/1976	3:34
3.	"Hey Little Girl" (Billy "The Kid" Emerson)	William Robert Emerson	January 11, 1954/1976	2:18
4.	"I'm Gonna Forget About You Baby (Matchbox)" (Ike Turner & the Kings of Rhythm with Tommy Hodge)	Ike Turner	1958/1976	2:35
5.	"The Snuggle" (Raymond Hill)	Raymond Hill	April 12, 1954/May 1, 1954	3:00
6.	"No Teasing Around" (Billy "The Kid" Emerson)	William Robert Emerson	January 11, 1954/February 20, 1954	3:01
7.	"Love Is A Gamble" (Bonnie Turner)	Ike Turner	August 2, 1953/1976	2:11
8.	"You Can't Be The One For Me" (Ike Turner & the Kings of Rhythm with Tommy Hodge)	Ike Turner	1958/1976	2:36
9.	"I'm Not Going Home" (Billy "The Kid" Emerson)	William Robert Emerson	April 12, 1954/May 1, 1954	3:13
10.	"Ugly Woman" (Johnny O'Neal)	Johnny O'Neal Johnson	August 2, 1953/1976	2:37
11.	"Bourbon Street Jump" (Raymond Hill)	Raymond Hill	April 12, 1954/May 1, 1954	2:40
12.	"When My Baby Quit Me #2" (Billy "The Kid" Emerson)	William Robert Emerson	April 12, 1954/1990	2:42
13.	"Old Brother Jack" (Bonnie Turner)	Ike Turner	August 2, 1953/1976	2:53
14.	"How Long Will It Last" (Ike Turner & the Kings of Rhythm with Tommy Hodge)	Ike Turner	1958/1976	2:45
15.	"Loving Is Believing" (Billy "The Kid" Emerson)	William Robert Emerson	January 11, 1954/February 20, 1954	2:14
16.	"Way Down In The Congo" (Bonnie Turner, Raymond Hill)	Ike Turner	August 2, 1953/1976	2:48
17.	"Why Should I Keep Trying" (Ike Turner & the Kings of Rhythm with Tommy Hodge)	Ike Turner	1958/1976	2:22
18.	"When My Baby Quit Me #1" (Billy "The Kid" Emerson)	William Robert Emerson	April 12, 1954/1976	2:55
19.	"I'm Lonesome Baby" (Ike Turner)	Ike Turner	March 5, 1951/April 1951	3:01
20.	"The Woodchuck" (Billy "The Kid" Emerson)	William Robert Emerson	April 12, 1954/May 1, 1954	3:06
