= Willie Kizart =

- Born: Willie Lee Kizart; January 4, 1932; Tutwiler, Mississippi, U.S.
- Died: September 2, 1998 (aged 66) Dallas, Texas, U.S.
- Genres: Blues, R&B, rock and roll
- Occupation: Musician
- Instrument: Guitar
- Formerly of: Ike Turner, Kings of Rhythm

Willie Kizart (January 4, 1932 – September 2, 1998) was an American electric blues guitarist best known for being a member of Ike Turner's Kings of Rhythm in the 1950s. Kizart played guitar on "Rocket 88" in 1951, which is considered by some accounts to be the first rock and roll record. The record is noted for featuring one of the first examples of distortion ever recorded; played by Kizart.

== Life and career ==
Willie Lee Kizart was born in Tutwiler, Mississippi on January 4, 1932. His father, Lee Kizart, was a local blues and boogie pianist. He also repaired pianos and gave music lessons. Since childhood, Kizart was exposed to various Delta Blues musicians who performed at his father's cafe in Glendora, which became well known for its blues music. Kizart learned how to play guitar from slide guitarist Earl Hooker. In his teens he joined Ike Turner's band, the Kings of Rhythm.

In March 1951, the Kings of Rhythm traveled to Memphis for a recording session at Sam Phillips' Memphis Recording Service. During the drive to the studio, Kizart's amplifier was damaged on Highway 61 after being dropped from the car's trunk when the band got a flat tire. The amplifier was stuffed with wadded newspapers to keep the speaker cone in place, which unintentionally created a distorted sound during the recording of "Rocket 88." The single was released in April 1951 and reached number-one on the Billboard R&B charts in June 1951. The record was credited to saxophonist and vocalist Jackie Brenston, causing friction in the band. Turner and the band were only paid $20 each for the record with the exception of Brenston who sold the rights to Phillips for $910. Following the success of the record, Brenston left the band to pursue a solo career and Turner disbanded the Kings of Rhythm for a few years.

In October 1952, Kizart joined Kings of Rhythm saxophonist Raymond Hill for a session at Sun Studio. The recordings were later released on various compilation albums, including Sun: The Roots Of Rock: Volume 3: Delta Rhythm Kings (1976) and Sun Records: The Blues Years 1950-1956 (1984).

In late 1954, Kizart moved to East St. Louis with Turner and the newly reformed Kings of Rhythm. The other band members included Willie "Bad Boy" Sims on drums, vocalist Johnny O'Neal, Turner's nephew Jessie Knight Jr. on bass, and Turner's wife Annie Mae Wilson on piano and vocals. Turner moved over from playing piano to guitar in order to accommodate Wilson, taking lessons from Kizart to improve.

Kizart later worked as a session musician, backing local St. Louis musicians such as "Little Aaron" Mosby.

Kizart died at the age of 66 in Dallas on September 2, 1998.

== Discography ==
=== Albums as a sideman ===
- 1976: Sun: The Roots Of Rock: Volume 3: Delta Rhythm Kings (Charly Records)
- 1984: Sun Records: The Blues Years 1950-1956 (Sun Records)
- 2008: Ike Turner — Classic Early Sides 1952–1957 (JSP Records)
- 2010: Ike Turner — That Kat Sure Could Play! The Singles 1951 To 1957 (Secret Records Limited)
