= Raymond Hill (musician) =

- Hill as a member of the Kings of Rhythm (1956)

Background information
- Born: April 29, 1933; Clarksdale, Mississippi, U.S.
- Died: April 16, 1996 (aged 62)
- Genres: Blues, R&B
- Occupations: Musician; singer
- Instrument: Saxophone
- Years active: 1951–1980
- Labels: Sun; High Water
- Formerly of: Kings of Rhythm

Raymond Earl Hill (April 29, 1933 – April 16, 1996) was an American tenor saxophonist and singer, best known as a member of Ike Turner's Kings of Rhythm in the 1950s. He also recorded as a solo artist for Sun Records and worked as a session musician.

== Life and career ==
Hill was born in Clarksdale, Mississippi. His parents, Henry and Ollie Mae Hill, ran cafés in Clarksdale as well as a juke joint north of Lyon that featured Delta blues musicians such as Sonny Boy Williamson and Robert Nighthawk. Hill learned to play the saxophone by getting Houston Stackhouse to strum the chords on his guitar then finding the corresponding notes on his saxophone.

Hill joined Ike Turner's band in the late 1940s, first the Tophatters big band and then the smaller Kings of Rhythm. He was Turner's regular tenor saxophone player at the band's first recording sessions at Sam Phillips' Memphis Recording Service in March 1951, which produced the R&B classic "Rocket 88." The record was credited to Kings of Rhythm saxophonist and vocalist Jackie Brenston. The record features a solo by 17-year-old Hill, after Brenston's cry of "blow your horn, Raymond, blow!." The single reached number-one on the Billboard R&B chart, and has often been called "the first rock and roll record."

Hill left Turner's band soon after the record was released. Turner stated Hill's mother wanted him to be the bandleader and they started to quarrel. Hill continued to play on some of Turner's records. He also worked as a session musician at Sun Records and other local labels, backing Howlin' Wolf and Little Junior Parker among others. Hill plays tenor sax on Parker's "Mystery Train," and he is the lead performer on the instrumental "Ooh Poo Pah Doo (Part II)" by Jessie Hill. "Spread your fingers, Raymond!," shouts Jessie Hill who was no relation.

In October 1952, Hill recorded a session at Sun Studio with his own band Raymond Hill and his Jump For Joy, including Turner's former guitarist Willie Kizart. Sam Phillps offered the tapes to Chess Records and they were rejected. It was in the midst of Phillips falling out with the Chess brothers. The recordings were later released on the compilation albums Sun: The Roots Of Rock: Volume 3: Delta Rhythm Kings in 1976, Sun: The Roots Of Rock: Volume 11: Memphis Blues Sounds released in 1977, and Sun Records: The Blues Years 1950-1956 in 1984. Hill's band enjoyed some success back in Clarksdale and he held a disc jockey position at WROX to promote his band. The local Clarksdale Press Register newspaper reported that Hill was ''chief of the hepcats.'' Hill also recorded with Turner's band, featuring Turner on guitar and Billy "The Kid" Emerson on piano, releasing the single "The Snuggle"/"Bourbon Street Jump" under his own name on Sun in 1954, both sides being instrumentals.

Between 1952 and 1955, Hill played on records with Clayton Love (Aladdin, 1952), Little Junior Parker (Modern, 1952/Sun, 1953), Billy "The Kid" Emerson (Sun, 1054), and Jesse Knight (Checker, 1954). While in Chicago, he also accompanied Dennis "Long Man" Binder (United, 1955), before rejoining Turner's Kings of Rhythm.

In 1955, Hill returned to working in Turner's band on a full-time basis and moved to East St. Louis where Turner had relocated. The Kings of Rhythm played all around the Greater St. Louis area and became a popular nightclub attraction. In 1957, Hill began a relationship with the band's new vocalist, 17-year-old Ann Bullock, then known as Little Ann and later as Tina Turner. Together they had a child, Raymond Craig (August 20, 1958 – July 3, 2018), who was later adopted by Ike Turner and renamed Craig Raymond Turner. Before the birth of his son, Hill broke his ankle during a wrestling match with vocalist Carlson Oliver and left the band, returning to Clarksdale.

In 1958, Hill played with Tommy B. and his Teardrops. He toured with Albert King in the 1960s. In 1979, he recorded an EP ("Going Down" / "Cotton Fields - Boss Man") with his wife Lillie Hill, which was released in 1980 for the newly founded High Water Recording Company, then he left the music business.

== Death ==
Hill died at the age of 62 from congestive heart failure in Clarksdale on April 16, 1996. According to his obituary in The Commercial Appeal, he was survived by a daughter, Cathy Mitchell; a son, Craig Turner; a sister, Marian Montgomery; two brothers, Aubrey Hill and Charles Hill Jr.; and an aunt who cared for him, Evelyn Jarrett.

His biological son with Tina Turner, Craig Turner, died from an apparent suicide in 2018.

== Discography ==
=== Solo singles ===
- 1954: "The Snuggle" / "Bourbon Street Jump" (Sun 204) – Raymond Hill
- 1980: "Going Down" / "Cotton Fields - Boss Man" (High Water 408) – Raymond Hill / Lillie Hill

=== Album appearances ===
- 1976: Sun: The Roots Of Rock: Volume 3: Delta Rhythm Kings (Charly Records)
- 1977: Sun: The Roots Of Rock: Volume 11: Memphis Blues Sounds (Charly Records)
- 1984: Sun Records: The Blues Years 1950-1956 (Sun Records)
- 2001: The Kings of Rhythm featuring Ike Turner – The Sun Sessions (Varèse Sarabande)
- 2011: Ike Turner – That Kat Sure Could Play!: The Singles 1951 To 1957 (Secret Records)
- 2017: Ike Turner – Sessionography Vol. 1 (Real Gone Records)
