= Edna Richardson =

- Also known as: Le'Juene Fletcher
- Born: Edna Woods; August 23, 1949 (age 76); Akron, Ohio, U.S.
- Genres: R&B, soul, funk

Edna Woods (born August 23, 1949), also known as LeJeune Richardson, is an American singer, dancer and actress. She was an Ikette in the Ike & Tina Turner Revue in the 1960s and 1970s, and later a dancer for Tina Turner in the 1980s and 1990s. Richardson was a backing vocalist for Gayle McCormick and John Mayall. She was also a member of the vocal group Silver, Platinum & Gold.

== Life and career ==
Richardson was born Edna Woods on August 23, 1949, in Akron, Ohio. As a teenager, she worked as a beautician and sang gospel. Richardson got her professional start as a singer in the group Soul Sensations. Richardson joined the Ike & Tina Turner Revue an Ikette in 1968. As an Ikette, Richardson toured the world and appeared on various television shows, including The Hollywood Palace, The Smothers Brothers Comedy Hour, Soul Train, The Dick Cavett Show, The Midnight Special, Cher, and Don Kirshner's Rock Concert.

In the mid-1970s, Richardson pursued a career in film. As an actress, she has credited roles in Truck Turner (1974) and Darktown Strutters (1975).

After the dissolution of the Ike & Tina Turner Revue in 1976, Richardson recorded an album as part of the vocal trio Silver, Platinum & Gold. The group consisted of Richardson, Renee King and Flo King, who were also former backing vocalists. They released a self-titled album on Farr Records in late 1976. Richardson co-wrote seven songs on the album. The single "Just Friends" reached No. 63 on the Billboard R&B chart. The group toured with Wild Cherry in 1976. They released another album, Hollywood, on Neptune Records in 1981.

Richardson joined Tina Turner during her solo career as a dancer in 1980. By then, she had begun going by the name LeJeune Richardson. She appeared in Turner's music videos "Let's Stay Together" (1983) and "Help!" (1984). Richardson toured with Turner on-and-off until her Foreign Affair World Tour in 1990.

She was married to Kings of Rhythm drummer Soko Richardson.

== Discography ==
=== Silver, Platinum & Gold albums ===
- 1976: Silver, Platinum & Gold
- 1981: Hollywood

=== Backing vocal credits ===
- 1972: Gayle McCormick – Flesh & Blood
- 1977: John Mayall – A Hard Core Package

== Filmography ==
Year	Film	Role
1974	Truck Turner	Frenchie (as Dorinda's Girls)
1975	Darktown Strutters	Carmen
