= Rocks the Blues =

Studio album by Ike Turner
- Released: 1963
- Label: Crown
- Producer: Ike Turner

Ike Turner chronology
Ike & Tina Turner's Kings of Rhythm Dance (1962)	Rocks the Blues (1963)	A Black Man's Soul (1969)

Professional ratings
Review scores
Source	Rating
Allmusic	4.5/5 stars

Rocks The Blues is the first album credited to musician Ike Turner. Released in 1963 from Crown Records, it contains mostly previously released singles from the 1950s.

== Content and release ==
After the release of "Rocket 88" in 1951, Ike Turner became a session musician and production assistant for the Bihari brothers at Modern Records. They also contracted him as a talent scout to exploit his connections in the Delta Blues scene. Unaware of songwriter's royalties, Turner was also paid to write new material which they copyrighted under their own names. A majority of the tracks on Rocks The Blues were written by Turner, but credited to him and the Bihari brothers. The Biharis were not songwriters, they used pseudonyms for songwriting credits: Julius Bihari was credited as Jules Taub, Joseph Bihari as Joe Josea, and Saul Bihari as Sam Ling.

The album starts off with the blues rock instrumental "Hey Miss Tina" and culminates with a nearly 9-minute blues medley titled "All the Blues, All the Time" for the closing song. Dennis Binder is the lead vocalist on "I Miss You So" (originally released on Modern 930 in 1954) and "Nobody Wants Me." "Cubano Jump" (1040A), "Loosely" (1040B), "Cuban Getaway" (1059A), and "Go To It" (1059B) which were originally released on Flair Records in 1954, have a different title on this album. "The Way You Used to Treat Me" was originally released on RPM 409 in 1954, credited to Ike's alias "Lover Boy".

Rocks The Blues was released on Crown Records, a subsidiary of Modern Records. By the time the album was released in 1963, Turner had already had a string of hit records as half of the R&B duo Ike & Tina Turner.

== Reissues ==
Rocks the Blues was reissued by P-Vine Records (PCD-3031/2) as a 2-CD compilation in 1993. It features an additional 36 recordings from Ike Turner & The Kings of Rhythm.

== Track listing ==
Side A
No.	Title	Writer(s)	Length
1.	"Hey Miss Tina" (previously titled "Cubano Jump")	Joe Josea, Ike Turner	2:13
2.	"Stringin' Along" (previously titled "Go To It")	Jules Taub, Sam Ling	2:24
3.	"I Miss You So" (vocal: Dennis Binder)	Joe Josea, Ike Turner	3:05
4.	"Nobody Wants Me" (vocal: Dennis Binder)	Joe Josea, Ike Turner	2:37
5.	"The Way You Used to Treat Me" (vocal: Ike Turner)	Joe Josea, Ike Turner	2:39

Side B
No.	Title	Writer(s)	Length
1.	"Bayou Rock" (previously titled "Cuban Getaway")	Joe Josea, Ike Turner	3:13
2.	"The Wild One" (previously titled "Loosely")	Jules Taub, Sam Ling	2:31
3.	"All the Blues, All the Time" (Instrumental Medley)		8:44

Note: the songs included in the "All the Blues, All the Time" medley:

- "Feelin' Good" by Little Junior Parker's Blue Flames
- "Love My Baby" by Little Junior Parker's Blue Flames
- "Please Love Me" by B.B. King and His Orchestra
- "Boogie Chillen" by John Lee Hooker
- "Dust My Broom" by Robert Johnson; also recorded by Elmore James
- "Rockin' and Rollin'" a.k.a. "Rock Me Baby" by Melvin "Lil' Son" Jackson; also recorded by B.B. King
- "Hoochie Coochie Man" by Willie Dixon; also recorded by Muddy Waters
- "Woke Up This Morning" by B.B. King and His Orchestra
