= Pete Wade =

American guitarist (1934–2024)

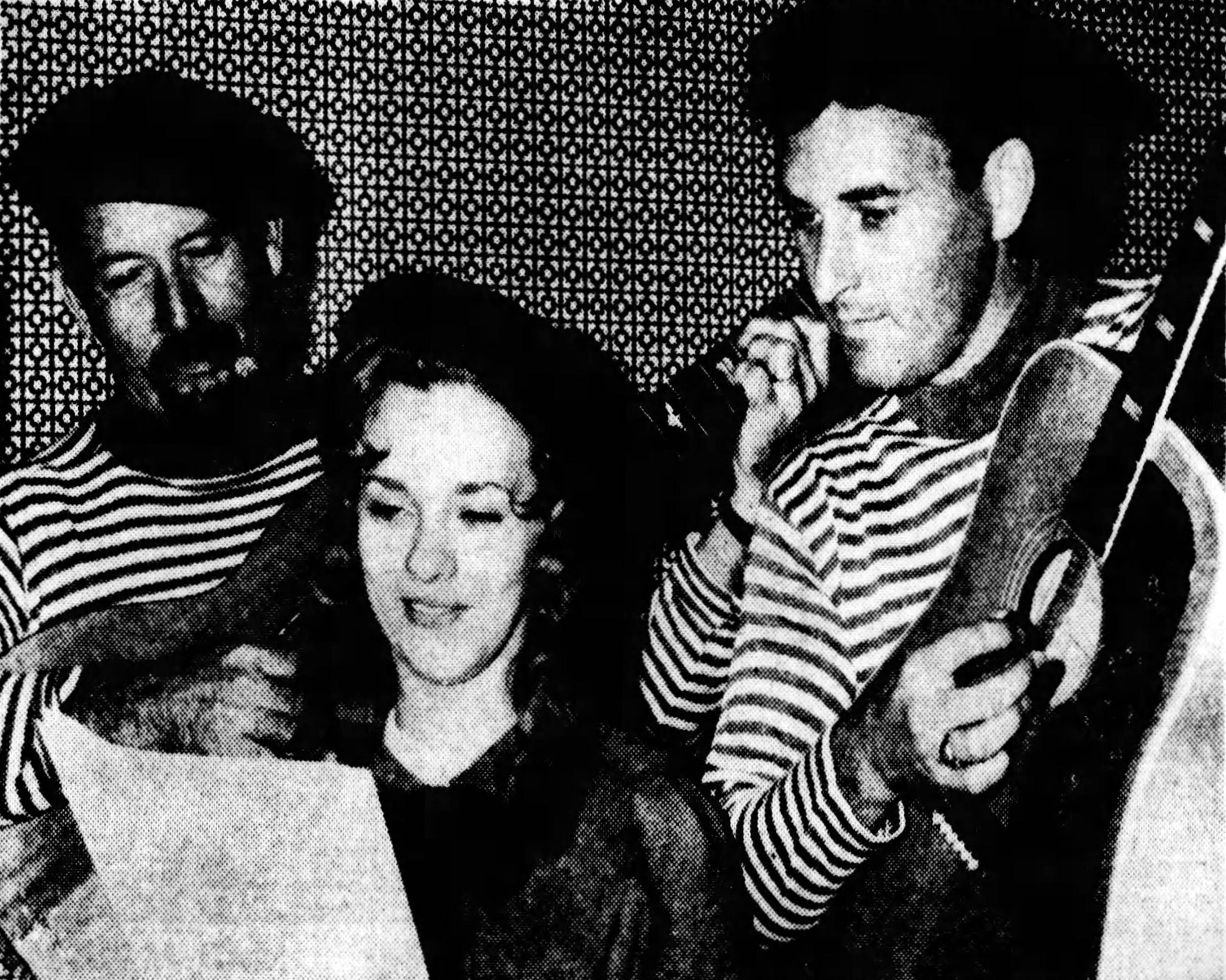
- Wade (right) at recording session with guitarist Dean Porter and singer Connie Smith in 1966
- Born: Herman Bland Wade; December 16, 1934; Norfolk, Virginia, U.S.
- Died: August 27, 2024 (aged 89); Hendersonville, Tennessee, U.S.
- Occupations: Guitarist; Session musician
- Awards: 1976: "Superpicker Band '76", NARAS
- Honors: 2002: Selected top musician by the Reunion of Professional Entertainers; 2016: Honored as a Nashville Cat by the Country Music Hall of Fame

Herman Bland "Pete" Wade (December 16, 1934 – August 27, 2024) was an American guitarist. Wade worked as a session musician in Nashville, playing on numerous hits including "Crazy Arms" by Ray Price, "He Stopped Loving Her Today" by George Jones, and "Fist City" by Loretta Lynn. He was considered to be part of the Nashville A-Team.

== Life and career ==
Herman Bland "Pete" Wade was born in Norfolk, Virginia, on December 16, 1934. When he was 19, he moved to Nashville to be a guitar player. During his trip to Nashville, he only had $3, his suitcase, two ham sandwiches (he forgot the sandwiches on a bus) and telephone numbers for Don Helms and Jerry Rivers. Helms helped Wade join the Cherokee Cowboys, the band of Ray Price. From 1954 to 1964, Wade toured with Price, played guitar with the Cherokee Cowboys, and is credited with having aided in establishing the "shuffling sound" of Price's music. He also played lead guitar in the Country Deputies with Faron Young in 1957 and 1958, replacing Jimmy and Johnny Fautheree. By the late 1960s, Wade was a full-time session musician. His career included playing on songs such as "Crazy Arms", "He Stopped Loving Her Today", "Mountain of Love", "Fist City", "Harper Valley P.T.A." and "Delta Dawn".

Wade performed alongside Bobby Bare and Margie Bowes at the 30th annual summer concert series in Nashville in 1966. As a member of the Nashville Guitars, Wade performed as part of the 1967 Grammy Awards.

In 1976, the Nashville chapter of the National Academy of Recording Arts and Sciences included Wade among the 22 artists named that year as part of the "Superpicker Band '76". Wade was part of the group of session artists in Nashville known as the Nashville A-Team for the thousands of records on which their music is featured. He had also received a certificate in 1975 for his work as a session musician on number one charting songs that year.

Wade was known for keeping a notebook with copies of the musical compositions for the sections of the songs he played over his career.

In 1990, Wade opened Pete Wade's Music Hall and the Oak Tree Restaurant in Springfield, Tennessee. Musicians Loretta Lynn, Kitty Wells, Johnny Wright, Vic Willis, and Don Helms helped break ground for the construction of both businesses. In 1991, the performances were broadcast live on WDBL Saturday evenings.

The Reunion of Professional Entertainers selected Wade as the top musician at their CMA banquet in 2002. The Country Music Hall of Fame honored Wade in 2016 as part of their series on "Nashville Cats".

Wade died of complications from hip surgery at his daughter's home in Hendersonville, Tennessee, on August 27, 2024, at the age of 89.
