= Soko Richardson =

American drummer

- Richardson on the back cover of the John Mayall album, The Latest Edition (photography and design by John Mayall, 1974)

Background information
- Born: Eulis Richardson; December 8, 1939; New Iberia, Louisiana, United States
- Died: January 29, 2004 (aged 64) Los Angeles, California, United States
- Genres: Blues, R&B, blues-rock, rock, soul
- Occupations: Drummer, percussionist, arranger
- Instrument: Drums
- Years active: 1955–2004

Eulis Soko Richardson (December 8, 1939 – January 29, 2004) was an American rhythm and blues drummer. His career spanned almost fifty years, during which he performed and recorded with seminal groups including John Mayall's Bluesbreakers and the Ike & Tina Turner Revue. He is perhaps best known for his innovative arrangement of Ike & Tina Turner's version of the Creedence Clearwater Revival song "Proud Mary."

== Biography ==
Richardson was born and raised in New Iberia, Louisiana. He began his musical career at the age of 16, when he left home to tour the South with local bands. Shortly thereafter Ike Turner, upon hearing Richardson play in Texas, hired him to play with his band, the Kings of Rhythm, and then later with the Ike & Tina Turner Revue. Richardson worked with Turner for the next ten years. His ex-wife Edna Richardson was an Ikette in the revue as well. In 1971, Richardson's arrangement of the Creedence Clearwater Revival song "Proud Mary" reached No. 4 on the pop chart and No. 5 on the R&B chart. It became a signature song for Ike & Tina Turner and won them a Grammy Award for Best R&B Vocal Performance by a Group in 1972. He continued performing with the Turners on-and-off until 1974.

In 1971, Richardson joined John Mayall's Bluesbreakers, with whom he would tour and record for the next decade, playing with many of the diverse artists to whom Mayall gave a start.

In the mid-1980s, Richardson joined Albert Collins and the Icebreakers and became an influential figure in the Chicago blues scene. He helped earn the Icebreakers the W. C. Handy Award as Blues Band of the Year in 1985. In 1988, Richardson rejoined Ike Turner, who hadn't performed in 12 years following his split with Tina Turner.

Over the years Richardson recorded with many other artists, including Pee Wee Crayton, Bobby Womack and the English guitarist Terry Reid, with whom he was recording an album at the time of his death. Though limited by health problems in later years, he continued to perform and record and to sit in on jam sessions with friends. He played his last gig a few weeks before his death, at a club with Reid.

Richardson died in the early hours of January 29, 2004, in his home in Los Angeles, from complications of diabetes. He was 64. He was survived by two daughters, Rosalyn and Dia Richardson, and three grandchildren.

== Partial discography ==
=== With Ike & Tina Turner ===
- 1966: River Deep – Mountain High, Ike & Tina Turner (London Records)
- 1969: A Black Man's Soul, Ike Turner's Kings of Rhythm (Pompeii Records)
- 1971: What You Hear is What You Get, Ike & Tina Turner (United Artists Records)
- 1972: Strange Fruit, Family Vibes (United Artists Records)
- 1991: Proud Mary: The Best of Ike & Tina Turner (EMI)

=== With John Mayall and the Bluesbreakers ===
- 1974: The Latest Edition (Polydor)
- 1975: New Year, New Band, New Company (ABC/One Way)
- 1975: Notice to Appear (ABC/One Way)
- 1976: Banquet in Blues (ABC/One Way)
- 1977: A Hard Core Package (ABC/One Way)
- 1978: Last of the British Blues (ABC/OneWay), live recording
- 1982: Road Show Blues (DJM)

=== With Albert Collins ===
- 1988: In Concert (MVD), live DVD
- 1991: Iceman (Virgin)

=== Various others ===
- 1992: Guitars That Rule the World, various artists (Metal Blade)
- 1994: Chess Rhythm & Roll, various artists (Chess)
- 2003: Anthology, Bobby Womack (The Right Stuff)
