= Kings of Rhythm =

Band led by Ike Turner

The Kings of Rhythm
- Ike Turner's Kings of Rhythm (1956). Back: Jackie Brenston, Raymond Hill, Eddie Jones, Fred Sample, Billy Gayles. Front: Jesse Knight Jr., Ike Turner, and Eugene Washington

Background information
- Also known as: Jackie Brenston & His Delta Cats; Ike Turner & His Orchestra; Ike Turner's Kings Of Rhythm; Nasty Minds; Family Vibes
- Origin: Clarksdale, Mississippi, U.S.
- Genres: Jump blues; rhythm and blues; rock and roll; funk; soul
- Years active: late 1940s–1976, 1986-1987, 2001-present
- Labels: Sun; Modern; Sue; Sonja; Sony; Teena; United Artists
- Spinoff of: The Tophatters
- Members: Leo Dombecki – Keyboards, saxophone; Bill Ray – Drums; Armando Cepeda – Bass; Ryan Montana – Saxophone; Seth Blumberg – Guitar; Earl Thomas
- Past members: Ike Turner; Jackie Brenston; Willie Kizart; Raymond Hill; Willie "Bad Boy" Sims; Johnny O'Neal; Eugene Washington; Billy Gayles; Clayton Love; Ernest Lane; Jesse Knight Jr. Bonnie Turner; Annie Mae Wilson; Jimi Hendrix; Leon Blue; Mack Johnson; Clifford Solomon; Jackie Clark; Warren Dawson; Mark Landon; Soko Richardson; See members section for others

Kings of Rhythm are an American music group formed in the late 1940s in Clarksdale, Mississippi and led by Ike Turner through to his death in 2007. Turner would retain the name of the band throughout his career, although the group has undergone considerable line-up changes over time.

The group was an offshoot of a large big band ensemble called the Tophatters. By the late 1940s, Turner had renamed this group the Kings of Rhythm. Their early stage performances consisted largely of covers of popular jukebox hits of the day. In 1951, Turner and his Kings of Rhythm recorded the song "Rocket 88" (credited to Jackie Brenston and His Delta Cats), which is a contender for the first rock and roll record. The song is inducted into the Blues Hall of Fame, the Grammy Hall of Fame, and the Rock and Roll Hall of Fame Singles.

In the 1960s, the Kings of Rhythm became the band for the "Ike & Tina Turner Revue". For a few years in the early 1970s they were renamed the Family Vibes, and released two albums under that name. After the disbanding of the Ike & Tina Turner Revue in 1976, Turner revived the Kings of Rhythm in 2001 and released the Grammy-nominated album Here And Now. The Kings of Rhythm backed Turner on his Grammy-winning album Risin' with the Blues (2006). After Turner died in 2007, the band for some time was under the leadership of pianist Ernest Lane, who was a childhood friend of Turner's. The Kings of Rhythm continue to perform with vocalist Earl Thomas.

== Career ==
=== Formation: The Tophatters ===
As a teenager, Ike Turner joined a large rhythm ensemble in Clarksdale, Mississippi called the Tophatters, which included musicians Raymond Hill, Eugene Fox, and Clayton Love. They performed at local dances, playing big band arrangements from sheet music. At one point the Tophatters had over 30 members, and eventually split into two, with one act who wanted to carry on playing dance band jazz calling themselves the Dukes of Swing and the other, led by Turner, becoming the Kings of Rhythm. A rivalry between the two former factions of the Tophatters lasted for some time, with the two staging an open air 'battle-of-the-bands' where they played from atop two flatbed trucks every fortnight.

=== 1940s: Early years ===
The Kings of Rhythm had a regular Wednesday night residency at Clarksdale's Harlem Theater. This got them bookings around the Mississippi Delta region. Their early stage performances consisted largely of covers of popular jukebox hits. In March 1951 whilst driving between gigs, the Kings of Rhythm dropped in on a B.B. King club date in Chambers, Mississippi. Turner persuaded King to let the band sit in and play a number with him. King contests this, remembering that it was only Turner who sat in with his band. They were well received and the club owner booked them for a weekend residency, whilst King recommended them to Sam Philips at Sun Studios in Memphis, Tennessee. In the 1950s, The Kings received regular airplay from live sessions on Clarksdale radio station WROX-AM, at the behest of DJ Early Wright. The band would sometimes play a session that lasted an hour.

=== 1951: "Rocket 88" ===
Sam Phillips invited the Kings of Rhythm down to Memphis to record at Sun Studios, and the group had to devise an original song at short notice for the session. The saxophonist, Jackie Brenston, suggested a song about the new Rocket 88 Oldsmobile. Turner worked out the arrangement and the piano introduction and the band collaborated on the rest with Brenston on vocals. "Rocket "88"" came out with the group erroneously credited as Jackie Brenston and his Delta Cats, instead of Ike Turner and his Kings of Rhythm featuring Jackie Brenston. The single went on to sell half a million copies, reaching the top of the Billboard R&B charts in June 1951. The success of the record caused divisions within the group, with Brenston believing he was now the star and should front the group, and Turner and Raymond Hill bitter that they had received little recognition or recompense for writing and recording a hit record. Turner and the band were paid only $20 each for the record, with the exception of Brenston, who sold the rights to Phillips for $910.

The group's regular singer, Johnny O'Neal, had left prior to the recording of "Rocket "88"" to sign a contract with King Records, but Turner still refused to allow Brenston to take over as singer. Following the success of the record, Brenston was convinced he was the star of the group and left to pursue a solo career. This caused the group to fall apart with some members backing Brenston on the road. However, Turner held onto the name and soon reformed the Kings of Rhythm with a new line-up.

=== 1952–1954: Sun/Modern Records ===
Between 1952 and 1954, Turner became a session musician and production assistant for Sam Philips at Sun Records and the Bihari brothers at Modern/RPM Records. Turner was also a freelance talent scout, and used the Kings of Rhythm as session musicians. They played on many recording for the Biharis' Modern, RPM, and Flair labels.

Turner's wife Bonnie Turner was a pianist and vocalist in his new line-up. They released the record "My Heart Belongs To You" / "Looking for My Baby" from RPM in 1952. The Kings of Rhythm which included Bonnie Turner, Raymond Hill, Billy "The Kid" Emerson and Johnny O'Neal recorded for Sun in 1953 and 1954. Some of the recordings remained unissued until Charly Records released of Sun: The Roots Of Rock: Volume 3: Delta Rhythm Kings in 1976. Turner and the Kings of Rhythm last recorded for Sun in 1958 with Tommy Hodge; by then, Phillips had shifted his focus onto rockabilly music and wasn't recording many black musicians anymore.

=== 1954–1962: St. Louis ===
In late 1954, Turner took the reformed version of Kings of Rhythm north to East St. Louis, which included Kizart, Sims, O'Neal, Jesse Knight Jr. and Turner's then wife Annie Mae Wilson on piano and vocals. Around this time, Turner moved over to playing guitar to accommodate Wilson, taking lessons from Willie Kizart to improve.

Turner maintained strict discipline over the band, insisting they lived in a large house with him so he could conduct early morning rehearsals at a moment's notice. He would fire anyone he suspected of drinking or taking drugs, and would fine band members if they played a wrong note. He controlled everything from the arrangements down to the suits the band wore onstage. Starting off playing at a club called Kingsbury's in Madison, Illinois, within a year Turner had built up a full gig schedule, establishing his group as one of the most highly rated on the St. Louis club circuit, vying for popularity with their only real competition, Sir John's Trio featuring Chuck Berry. The bands would play all-nighters in St. Louis, then cross the river to the clubs of East St. Louis, and continue playing until dawn. In St. Louis for the first time Turner and the band were exposed to a developing white teenage audience who were excited by rhythm and blues. Clubs they played in St. Louis included Club Imperial, which was popular with white teenagers, The Dynaflow, The Moonlight Lounge, Club Riviera and the West End Walters. In East St. Louis, the group would play at Kingsbury's, Manhattan Club and The Sportsman.

Between live dates, Turner took the band to Cincinnati to record for Federal in 1956. The session produced the regional hit "I'm Tore Up," featuring lead vocalist Billy Gayles. In 1958, the band recorded for Cobra/Artistic in Chicago, serving as the house band for Buddy Guy, Otis Rush, and Betty Everett. Turner befriended St. Louis R&B fan Bill Stevens, who in 1959 set up the short-lived record label Stevens Records, which was financed by his father, Fred Stevens. Turner and the Kings of Rhythm recorded for Stevens, of which seven singles were released and later included on the Red Lightnin' compilation Hey Hey (1984).

=== 1960–1976: The Ike & Tina Turner Revue ===
After the addition of his future wife Little Ann (Tina Turner) as lead singer, Turner formed the Ike & Tina Turner Revue. The creation of the revue was in a large part the birth of the soul revues of the 1960s. The Kings of Rhythm and Tina were joined on stage by the Ikettes, who contributed backing vocals and choreographed dance moves. As backing band to the duo, the band played on many substantial soul hits, including the million sellers "A Fool In Love" (1960) and "It's Gonna Work Out Fine"(1961) both for Sue Records. Also included in the revue were male singers Stacy Johnson, Vernon Guy, Jimmy Thomas and Bobby John. Turner moved the revue to California in 1962.

In the mid-1960s Jimi Hendrix briefly played backing guitar in the band. Turner fired him because his guitar solos became "so elaborate they overstepped the bounds." In 1964, the band released the single "Getting Nasty" / "Nutting Up" under the alias Nasty Minds on Turner's Sonja label. In addition the band appeared on local television shows and toured the Chitlin' Circuit. The Ike & Tina Turner Revue was featured in the 1965 concert film The Big T.N.T. Show. The lineup for that performance was Turner and Herb Sadler on guitar, James Norwood on drums, Sam Rhodes on bass and Ernest Lane on piano. In the fall of 1966, the Ike Tina Turner Reve joined the Rolling Stones in their British Tour. They also joined the Rolling Stones for their American Tour in 1969.

By 1970, Ike & Tina Turner had a resurgence on the charts with their rock covers. Following the success of their single "Proud Mary" in 1971, the Kings of Rhythm were renamed the Family Vibes. They released two albums as the Family Vibes, Strange Fruit (1972) and Confined to Soul (1973), both produced by Turner. The Ike & Tina Turner Revue disbanded in 1976.

=== 1986–1987: St. Louis Kings of Rhythm ===
In 1986, a revival of the King of Rhythm consisting of several veteran members toured Europe as the St. Louis Kings Of Rhythm. The tour extended into 1987, and an album titled St. Louis Kings Of Rhythm was released on Timeless Records in Europe. Mayor Vincent Schoemehl officially appointed the St. Louis Kings Of Rhythm ambassadors for the City of St. Louis.

=== 2001–present: Reformation ===
In the late 1990s Turner toured with Joe Louis Walker. The positive response to the tour encouraged him to reform the Kings of Rhythm. The Kings of Rhythm toured the U.S. in 2001 and headlined a showcase at South by Southwest, where they were hailed as one of the highlights of the conference. This led to the recording and release of the Grammy-nominated album Here And Now (2001) by Turner and the Kings of Rhythm. The album won two W.C. Handy Awards, the Blues Foundation's equivalent of the Grammy Awards, for Best Traditional Blues Album and Comeback Album of the Year in 2002. They received positive reviews for their performances at various music festivals, including Montreux Jazz Festival (2002), North Sea Jazz Festival (2002), and Jazz à Vienne (2004).

The Kings of Rhythm backed Turner on his Grammy-winning album Risin' With The Blues (2006). After Turner died in December 2007, the band was temporarily under the leadership of pianist Ernest Lane (1931–2012), a childhood friend of Turner's. The band performed Turner's classic songs at his funeral. Since 2008, the band has performed with vocalist Earl Thomas. Thomas became a fan of Ike & Tina Turner after watching the film Soul To Soul (1971) as a child. He met Turner in 2004 and remained in contact with him until his death.

== Legacy ==
By some accounts, "Rocket 88" is considered the first rock and roll record.

Speaking on "Rocket 88" being a contender for the first rock 'n' roll record, broadcaster Paul Gambaccini said:

In musical terms [he was] very important. "Rocket 88" is one of the two records that can claim to be the first rock 'n' roll record, the other being "The Fat Man" by Fats Domino from 1949. But "Rocket 88" does have a couple of elements which "The Fat Man" did not. The wailing saxophone and that distorted electric guitar. It was number one in the rhythm and blues chart for five weeks, it's in the Grammy Hall of Fame and it was an indisputable claim to fame for Ike Turner, even though his lead singer and saxophonist, Jackie Brenston, got the label credit.

=== Awards ===
"Rocket 88" was inducted into the Blues Hall of Fame in 1991, the Grammy Hall of Fame in 1998, and the Rock and Roll Hall of Fame Singles in 2018.

== Band members ==
=== 1951 Rocket 88 recording band (Jackie Brenston and His Delta Cats) ===
- Ike Turner – Piano
- Jackie Brenston – Saxophone, vocals
- Willie Kizart – Guitar
- Raymond Hill – Saxophone
- Willie "Bad Boy" Sims – Drums

=== 1950s–1960s members ===
- Ike Turner – Piano
- Jackie Brenston – Saxophone, vocals
- Billy Gayles – Vocals, drums
- Johnny O'Neal – Vocals
- Willie "Bad Boy" Sims – Drums
- Raymond Hill – Saxophone
- Bobby Fields
- Vernon Guy – Vocals
- Bob Prindall – Drums
- Edward Nash
- Eugene Washington – Drums
- Al St. James – Drums
- Eddie Jones – Tenor saxophone
- Eugene Fox – alto saxophone, vocals
- Clifford Solomon
- Clayton Love – Vocals
- Carlson Oliver – Vocals
- Jimmy Thomas – Vocals
- Bobby John – Vocals
- Stacy Johnson – Vocals
- Jimi Hendrix – Guitar
- Ernest Lane (early 60s and 1999–2009)
- Larry Lynch – Bass
- Al McKay – Guitar
- Leon Blue – Piano
- James "Bubba" Norwood – Drums
- Willie Kizart – Guitar
- C. V. Veal (Ike's cousin)
- Jesse Knight Jr. (Ike's nephew) – Bass
- Sam Rhodes – Bass
- Herb Sadler – Guitar
- Bonnie Turner (Ike's ex-wife) – Piano, vocals
- Little Ann (Tina Turner) – Vocals
- Annie Mae Wilson (Ike's ex-wife) – Piano
- Johnny Wright – Guitar, Vocals

=== Studio lineup for A Black Man's Soul (1969) ===
- Jesse Knight – Bass
- McKinley "Mack" Johnson – Drums
- Ike Turner – Guitar
- Teasky Tribble – Percussion
- Fred Sample, Ike Turner,
- Washee – Saxophone
- Jesse Heron – Trombone
- Tina Turner – Vocals

=== 1970s members ===
- Ike Turner – Guitar, Organ
- Leon Blue – Piano
- Edward Burks – Trombone
- Jackie Clark – Guitar
- Warren Dawson – Bass
- Patrick Gammon – Piano
- McKinley "Mack" Johnson – Trumpet
- Mark Landon – Guitar
- John Leland – Bass
- Mary Reed – Tenor saxophone
- Jimmie Smith – Tenor saxophone
- J.D. Reed – Baritone saxophone
- Soko Richardson – Drums
- Larry Reed – Tenor Saxophone
- Claude Williams – Trumpet

=== St. Louis Kings of Rhythm lineup (1986–1987) ===
- Clayton Love – Keyboard
- Billy Gayles – Drummer, vocals
- Robbie Montgomery – Vocalist
- Stacy Johnson – Vocalist
- Oliver Sain – Saxophone
- Jimmy Hinds – Bass
- Darrel Darden – Guitar (1986)
- Marvin "Buzzy" Morton – Guitar (1987)

=== Current members ===
- Paul Smith – Keyboards, Organ
- Leo Dombecki – Keyboards, Saxophone
- Bill Ray – Drums
- Armando Cepeda – Bass
- Kevin Cooper – Bass
- Ryan Montana – Saxophone
- Seth Blumberg – Guitar

== Partial discography ==
=== Studio albums ===
- 1962: Ike & Tina Turner's Kings of Rhythm Dance
- 1963: Rocks the Blues
- 1969: A Black Man's Soul
- 1972: Strange Fruit
- 1972: Blues Roots
- 1973: Confined to Soul
- 1973: Bad Dreams
- 2001: Here And Now
- 2006: Risin' With The Blues

=== Live albums ===
- 2002: Ike Turner's Kings Of Rhythm – The Resurrection: Live Montreux Jazz Festival, Isabel IS 640202
- 2006: Ike Turner & The Kings Of Rhythm – Live In Concert, Charly Films CHF-F1014LF [DVD/2CD]

=== Compilations ===
- 1976: Sun – The Roots Of Rock, Volume 3: Delta Rhythm Kings (Charly CR-30103)
- 1976: Ike Turner's Kings Of Rhythm – I'm Tore Up (Red Lightnin' RL-0016)
- 1984: The Legendary Ike Turner and The Kings of Rhythm – Hey Hey (Red Lightnin' RL-0047)
- 1990: Ike Turner's Kings Of Rhythm – Cobra Sessions 1958 (P-Vine PCD-2161)
- 2001: The Kings Of Rhythm Featuring Ike Turner – The Sun Sessions (Varèse Sarabande 302 066 232 2)
- 2004: Ike Turner And The Kings Of Rhythm – King Cobra: The Chicago Sessions (Fuel 2000/Varese 302 061 390 2)
- 2017: Ike Turner And The Kings Of Rhythm – She Made My Blood Run Cold (Southern Routes SR-CD-3502)

=== Singles ===
- 1951: "Heartbroken and Worried" / "I'm Lonesome Baby" (Chess 1459) – Ike Turner And His Kings of Rhythm,
- 1952: "My Heart Belongs To You" / "Looking for My Baby"(RPM 362) – Bonnie and Ike Turner With Orchestra Acc.
- 1954: "Sinners Dream" / "Stay At Home" (Checker 792) – Eugene Fox
- 1954: "Wicked Little Baby" / "Why Don't You Believe In Me" (Modern 929) – Clayton Love
- 1954: "I Miss You So" / "Early Times" (Modern 930) – Dennis Binder & His Orchestra
- 1954: "The Snuggle"/ "Bourbon Street Jump" (Sun 204) – Raymond Hill
- 1954: "Baby Please" / "Gypsy Blues" (Flair 1037) – Matt Cockrell
- 1954: "The Drean (Part 1)" / "The Dream (Part 2) (RPM 420) – The Fox
- 1956: "As Long As I Have You" / "I Wanna Make Love To You" (RPM 446) – The Trojans
- 1956: "What Am I To Do" / "I'll Die In Love With You" (Federal 12267) – The Rockers
- 1956: "My Baby's Tops" / "Flaming Tops" (Federal 12284) – The Gardenias
- 1956: "I'm Tore Up" / "If I Never Had Known You" (Federal 12265) – Billy Gayles with Ike Turner's Rhythm Rockers
- 1956: "Do Right Baby" / "No Coming Back" (Federal 12282) – Billy Gayles With Ike Turner's Kings Of Rhythm
- 1957: "Much Later" / "The Mistreater" (Federal 12291) – Jackie Brenston With Ike Turner's Kings Of Rhythm
- 1957: "What Can It Be" / "Gonna Wait For My Chance" (Federal 12283) – Jackie Brenston With Ike Turner's Kings Of Rhythm
- 1957: "Do You Mean It" / "She Made My Blood Run Cold" (Federal 12297) – Ike Turner And His Orchestra
- 1958: "Boxtop" / "Chalypso Love Cry" (Tune Town 501) – Ike Turner, Carlson Oliver, Little Ann
- 1959: "Box Top" / "Walking Down The Aisle" (Cobra 5033) – Ike Turner's Kings of Rhythm
- 1959: "(I Know) You Don't Love Me" / "Down & Out" (Artistic 1504) – Ike Turner's Kings of Rhythm, vocal by Tommy Hodge
- 1961: "Crackerjack" / "Gettin' Late" (Crackerjack 4000) – Ike Turner's Kings of Rhythm
- 1962: "Prancing" / "It's Gonna Work Out Fine" (Sue 760) – Ike & Tina's Kings of Rhythm
- 1962: "Drifting" / "Love You Baby" (Kent 45x378) – Ike Turner And His Orchestra, vocal by Bobby "Blue" Bland
- 1963: "Lonely Soldier" / "The Bad Man" (Sony 111) – Bobby John
- 1963: "Remove My Doubts" / "Don't Believe 'Em" (Sony 113) – Stacy Johnson
- 1963: "What's That You've Got" / "Need My Help" (Sony 114) – Ernest Lane
- 1964: "Anything - To Make It With You" / "Walking Down The Isle" (Sonja 2007) – Vernon Guy
- 1964: "Getting Nasty" / "Nutting Up" (Sonja 5001) – Nasty Minds
- 1965: "The New Breed (Pt. 1)" / "The New Breed (Pt. 2)" (Sue 138) – Ike Turner & His Kings of Rhythm
- 1968: "You Got What You Wanted" / "Too Hot To Hold" (Pompeii 66682) – Tina Turner With Ike Turner & The Kings of Rhythm
- 1972: "Soppin' Molasses" / "Bootie Lip" (United Artists 50901) – Family Vibes
- 1973: "Garbage Man" / "El Burrito" (United Artists XW278) – Family Vibes

==== Uncredited recordings ====
- 1951: "Rocket 88" / "Come Back To Where You Belong" (Chess 1458) – recorded at Sam Phillips' studio in Memphis, Tennessee, on March 3 or 5, 1951 by Ike Turner and his band, The Kings of Rhythm (with his saxophonist and occasional singer Jackie Brenston, being credited on the record's label [Jackie Brenston and His Delta Cats] as the writer/performer).
- 1951: "My Real Gone Rocket" / "Tuckered Out" (Chess 1469) – credited as Jackie Brenston and His Delta Cats
