= Strange Fruit (Family Vibes album) =

Studio album by Family Vibes
- Released: January 1972
- Recorded: October 1971
- Studio: Bolic Sound (Inglewood, California)
- Genre: Instrumental; funk; soul; R&B
- Label: United Artists Records
- Producer: Ike Turner

Family Vibes chronology
A Black Man's Soul (1969)	Strange Fruit (1972)	Confined to Soul (1973)

Singles from Strange Fruit
- 1. "Soppin' Molasses" Released: April 1972

Professional ratings
Review scores
Source	Rating
Allmusic	2/5 stars

Strange Fruit is an instrumental album by the Family Vibes. The album was released on United Artists Records in January 1972. Led by Ike Turner, the Family Vibes, best known as the Kings of Rhythm, were the backing band for Ike & Tina Turner.

== Recording and release ==
Strange Fruit was recorded at Ike Turner's Bolic Sound Studios in Inglewood, California in October 1971. Turner arranged and produced the album. His sister-in-law Alline Bullock wrote two songs on the album, "Happy But Lonely" and "Bootie Lip." The latter was released as a B-side single to "Soppin' Molasses" in 1972.

== Critical reception ==
The album received positive reviews.

Detroit Free Press (March 26, 1972):

Students of soul artists like Ray Charles, James Brown and Ike and Tina Turner have always known a healthy share of the success of these giants can be directly attributed to the brilliance of the backing bands. Today's No. 1 back-up band is Ike Turner's Family Vibes, which had it all covered. You thought Sly's Family Stone had energy? Chicago? Blood, Sweat & Tears? .. Family Vibes is without a question the funkiest, most forceful and rock-it-to-you band in the country. This album is a killer.

Dayton Daily News (April 2, 1972):

It's all sound, baby. There is no Tina Turner on this album ... But back to this showcase of talent by Ike and the boys in the band doing a little jammin'—on their instruments, of course. Formerly, the group was called the Kings of Rhythm. They changed their name to the Family Vibes and will continue as the backup band for Ike and Tina's show."

== Track listing ==
Side 1
No.	Title	Writer(s)	Length
1.	"Happy But Lonely"	Aillene Bullock	4:39
2.	"Heep-A-Hole-Lot"	C. Lane	3:32
3.	"Jumpin'"	S.L. Cushenberry	2:34
4.	"Neckin'"	S.L. Cushenberry	3:00
5.	"Bootie Lip"	Aillene Bullock	3:15

Side 2
No.	Title	Writer(s)	Length
1.	"Soppin' Molasses"	C. Lane, Phillip Reese	2:27
2.	"Sweet"	S.L. Cushenberry	4:12
3.	"Sixty-Nine"	S.L. Cushenberry	2:42
4.	"D.M.Z."	Aillene Bullock	2:38
5.	"I-8-1-2 (I Ate One Too)"	Phillip Reese	3:17
6.	"Pardon Me"	C. Lane	2:56

== Personnel ==
- Arranger – Ike Turner
- Bass – Warren Dawson
- Baritone Saxophone – J. D. Reed
- Drums – Soko Richardson
- Engineer – Steve Waldman
- Guitar – Jackie Clark
- Organ – Ike Turner
- Producer – Ike Turner
- Tenor Saxophone – Jimmy Smith
- Tenor Saxophone – Larry Reed
- Trombone – Edward Burks
- Trumpet – Claude Williams, Mack Johnson
