= Patrick Gammon =

German singer-songwriter and musician (1956–1996)

Patrick Gammon (January 15, 1956 – October 28, 1996) was a singer-songwriter and musician based in Munich. Gammon played piano with Ike & Tina Turner for two years. He later recorded as a solo artist and worked as a session musician in Germany. In the 1970s, Gammon co-founded the company Gammarock Musik.

== Life and career ==
Gammon was born in Seattle, Washington on January 15, 1956. He began his music career with a local group named Family Affair in 1973 before auditioning to play with the Ike & Tina Turner Revue. As a member of the Kings of Rhythm he played with Ike & Tina Turner for two years.

In 1976, Gammon released his first record, "Party Hardy" on the UK label Galaxy Records. It was produced by German businessman Gerhard Augustin, who had been Ike & Tina Turner's manager. The single was followed by a deal with Chrysalis, which didn't result in any releases due to creative differences on which direction he should pursue. Gammon and Augustin founded the company Gammarock. In 1979, United Artist took over the administration of Gammarock Musik, including all compositions by Gammon. Gammon signed a deal with Metronome, which helped him raise money for him and Augustin to record a demo for Motown. On the Motown label he released the album Don't Touch Me in 1979.

Gammon spent time in Germany appearing on television, writing songs with Augustin, and working as a session musician and backing vocalist. Reviewing the album, Billboard (June 16, 1979) wrote: "Foreign made product (this was waxed in Germany) is unusual for Motown, but the company hits home with Gammon, whose gritty baritone and delivery recalls the excitement of Rick James, and the vocal texture of Lionel Richie. Most of the material is upbeat or midtempo, with solid percussion, layered synthesizers and brass flecked rhythms. Strong lemme backup is evident, too."

In 1983, Gammon's song "Do My Ditty" reached No. 96 on the UK Singles Chart. That year, Gammon formed the rap dup Patto with composer Thomas Fuchsberger.

== Discography ==
=== Albums ===
- 1978: Rawness (Gammarock)
- 1979: Don't Touch Me (Motown)
- 1981: Live At The Bavaria (Gammarock)
- 1983: Spin The Jam / Live (Blow Up)
- 1984: Cold Fever (Teldec)
- 1984: Patto (Teldec)
- 1985: Live Music (Teldec)
- 1986: Emerge (Teldec)

=== Backing vocal credits ===
- 1978: Ronnie Jones – Me And Myself
- 1978: Hot Line – Adrenalin
- 1979: Gepy & Gepy – Body To Body
- 1979: Mick Jackson – Weekend
- 1979: La Bionda – High Energy
- 1979: Mick Jackson – Step Inside My Rainbow
- 1979: Ronnie Jones – Fox On The Run
- 1979: D.D. Sound – The Hootchie Cootchie
- 1980: Ramona Wulf – Shake What Yo' Mama Give Ya
- 1980: Dada – Dada
- 1980: Paul Millns – Heartbreakin' Highway
- 1982: Chime – Disco
- 1983: Frank Duval – If I Could Fly Away
- 1993: Buddy Miles and the Mighty Rhythm Tribe – The Mighty Rhythm Tribe
- 1996: Ike Turner – My Bluescountry
