= Silver, Platinum & Gold =

- Origin: Los Angeles, California, U.S.
- Genres: Soul, disco
- Years active: 1974–1983
- Labels: Warner Bros., Farr Records
- Past members: Edna Richardson; Flo King; Renee King–Heard

Silver, Platinum & Gold was an American female trio consisting of former background singers, Edna Richardson, Flo King, and Renee King Heard.

== Biography ==
The group was formed in 1974, by former Ikette Edna Richardson, Flo King, and Renee King–Heard, who sung backup for Diana Ross, The Rolling Stones, Joe Cocker, Billy Preston, Ringo Starr, and Doris Troy. Throughout their tenure, they all sung lead and wrote the songs they recorded. In 1975, their single, "La-La Love Chains", peaked at No. 92 R&B. Another single, "Just Friends", peaked at No. 63 on the same chart in 1976. In that same year, they toured with Wild Cherry, and their debut self-titled album was released. Their second and final album, Hollywood, was released in 1981. The group released their final single in 1983, and later disbanded.

== Discography ==
=== Albums ===
- 1976: Silver, Platinum & Gold
- 1981: Hollywood

=== Singles ===
Year	Song title	US R&B Chart
1975	"La–La Love Chains"	92
1976	"Just Friends"	63
