= Constellation Records (Chicago) =

American record label

- Founded: 1963
- Founder: Ewart Abner
- Defunct: 1966
- Status: Defunct
- Distributor: self-distributed
- Genre: various
- Country of origin: United States

Constellation Records was an American record label extant from 1963 to 1966. Despite only being in business for a few years, the label was described by the Encyclopedia of Popular Music as "one of the legendary labels of the soul era".

Constellation was founded by Ewart Abner in 1963 after he was forced from Vee-Jay Records. His business partners included artist and repertory man Bunky Sheppard and investor Art Sheridan. The label's most successful artist was Gene Chandler. While it was a prominent releaser of Chicago soul music, it also released many singles from New Orleans–based musicians, as well as music in the genres of rock, pop, gospel, and blues.

Constellation released approximately 70 singles during its time of operation, many of which were re-released on CD by Collectables Records in later decades.

== Artists ==
- Gene Chandler
- Billy "The Kid" Emerson
- Nolan Chance
- Dee Clark
- Lee Dorsey
- Frankie Ford
- The Freedoms
- Wilbert Harrison
- Sonny Holliday
- Sandra Lynn
- Johnny Lytle
- Holly Maxwell
- Bobby Miller
- Roscoe Robinson
- The Sheppard
- Gerri Taylor
- Carol Vega
- Don Jacoby
