= Dennis Binder =

American singer-songwriter

- Also known as: Dennis "Long Man" Binder
- Born: November 18, 1928 (age 97); Rosedale, Mississippi, U.S.
- Genres: R&B, rock 'n' roll, country and western
- Occupations: Musician, singer-songwriter
- Instrument: Piano
- Labels: Chess; Sun; Modern; United; Earwig

Dennis Binder (born November 18, 1928) is an American rhythm and blues musician and singer-songwriter, best known for his song "Long Man Blues". Binder began his careers in the 1950s, recording for prominent R&B labels, including Chess Records, Sun Records, and Modern Records. He was also recorded with Ike Turner's Kings of Rhythm.

== Early life ==
Binder was born in Rosedale, Mississippi, on November 18, 1928. He began singing with his mother and aunts in church. As a child his family relocated to St. Louis, where he was introduced to blues music by a female impersonator named "Toots", who would play St. Louis blues style piano while Binder sat on his lap. His family moved to Chicago around 1939 where Binder taught himself how to play piano, determined to become a recording artist.

== Career ==
According to Binder, he first recorded for Chess Records around 1951. In 1952, Binder began recording with Ike Turner's Kings of Rhythm in Clarksdale, Mississippi. Although Binder stated he wasn't a member of Turner's band, they occasionally collaborated. Binder recalled: "I took my band down to Clarksdale to challenge Ike's band to a duel ... and then I would up recording with them." Turner arranged a session for Binder at Sun Studio in May 1952, but these recordings were unreleased. The song "Love You, Love You Baby" was later included in the 1984 boxset Sun Records: The Blues Years 1950–1956. In 1954, Binder recorded the single "I Miss You So" / "Early Times", backed by Turner for Modern Records in Clarksdale.

Around that time, Binder formed a band with former Kings of Rhythm drummer Bob Prindell and guitarist Vincent Duling in Memphis. Binder relocated the band to Chicago in 1954. In 1955, they recorded a few tracks for Chicago's United Records, one of the songs being "The Long Man". In addition to the trio, the backing band for the United session included saxophonists Raymond Hill and Bobby Fields, and bassist Al Smith. The recordings were unreleased until Delmark Records released the compilation album Long Man Blues in 2000.

Soon after the United session, Binder and his band toured with the Danderliers, a group on United/States Records. During the tour they stopped in Lawton, Oklahoma, to visit Prindell's father. Binder decided to make Lawton his home and has resided there since. Lawton was an Army base with a lively music scene. Blues musicians such as Earl Hooker and Roscoe Gordon performed at The Jive Club in Lawton which was a popular predominantly black nightclub. Rock 'n' roll was becoming popular and white audiences were enthusiastic about "black music", so Binder's band performed at white clubs. For some time, saxophonist A.C. Reed was a member of Binders band.

In November 1958, Binder recorded at the Norman Petty Studios in Clovis, New Mexico, resulting in the single "Crawdad Song" / "She's Sumpin' Else" released in 1959. He later recorded at Benson Studio in Oklahoma City. In the 1960s, Binder performed soul music, eventually venturing into country and western in the 1970s and then gospel music. Binder worked as a bail bondsman while recording and released music on his own label. He was introduced to Earwig Music Company President Michael Frank by a friend in 2004. This led to Binder signing a record deal with the Chicago-based Earwig label. In January 2007, Binder released his debut album Hole in That Jug. The album featured a mixture of blues, rock 'n' roll, and country. Binder performed at Ponderosa Stomp in 2008.

== Discography ==
=== Singles ===
- 1954: "I Miss You So" / "Early Times" (Modern 930)
- 1955: "The Long Man" / "I'm a Lover" (United 194)
- 1959: "Crawdad Song" / "She's Sumpin' Else" (Cottonwood 101)

=== Albums ===
- 2007: Hole in That Jug (Earwig Music)

==== Featured appearances ====
- 1980: Ike Turner's Kings Of Rhythm, Volume 1 (Ace)
- 1984: Sun Records: The Blues Years 1950–1956 (Sun)
- 1993: Ike Turner, Rocks The Blues (P-Vine)
- 2000: Long Man Blues (Delmark)
- 2008: Ike Turner, Classic Early Sides 1952–1957 (JSP)
