= Johnny Wright (guitarist) =

American guitarist

- Born: Johnny T. Wright; February 20, 1930; Centerville, Tennessee, U.S.
- Died: June 2, 1988 (aged 58)
- Genres: Blues, R&B
- Occupations: Musician, singer
- Instrument: Guitar

Johnny Wright (February 20, 1930 – June 2, 1988) was an American blues musician, best known for his recordings with bandleader Ike Turner. Wright also recorded with his own band.

== Life and career ==
Wright was born in Centerville, Tennessee to Jake and Mary Coble Wright. Wright and his brothers, Sherman and George performed together in their youth. Johnny told the Terre Haute Tribune Star: "My brothers Sherman, who played harmonica and George, who played violin and myself, we used to play on a corner in front of the courthouse for nickels and dimes." After his father died when he was 10 years old, Wright's family moved north to Richmond, Indiana, for work.

In 1950, Wright moved to St. Louis. He would perform with Chuck Berry in the neighboring East St. Louis, Illinois at the Cosmopolitan Club. While traveling to Detroit on a Greyhound bus in 1953, Wright wrote the song "I Was In St. Louis." He had broken up with his first wife and moved to Detroit in search of work. During his journey, he also wrote "I Stayed Down Boy," about a brawl he had with a girlfriend's lover. Both were recorded with assistance from Detroit promoter, Joe Von Battle in the back room of his record store. He sent Wright's recordings to King Records which were released on the King subsidiary DeLuxe Records. In 1955, Wright auditioned for Ike Turner who was then a talent scout for Modern Records. Wright signed to the label, recording, "Suffocate" and "The World Is Yours" with Turner baking him on guitar.

Wright formed his own band based in Madison, Illinois. In 1959, they recorded for Stevens Records in Granite City, resulting in "Look At That Chick" and "Gotta Have You For Myself." Wright moved to Los Angeles, playing gigs with Ike & Tina Turner as part of the Kings of Rhythm in the early 1960s. On his own he played at local clubs, sometimes pretending to be Lightning Hopkins and Elmore James when work was slow, since he said that promoters and club owners could not always differentiate one black artist from another. In 1968, Wright moved back to Indiana in search of work and to be closer to his family. During this period he was drinking heavily and rarely recorded. In 1977, with the help of Steve Rusin, Wright returned to the studio. While recording, Wright was working in a steel mill. He occasionally performed in clubs, sometimes with Rusin in his group, the Highway Blues Band. After a bad fall, Wright left his job at the steel mill and worked at Cowan & Cook Florists in Terre Haute, Indiana.

Wright died on June 2, 1988. He is buried in the Highland Lawn Cemetery in Terre Haute.

== Discography ==
=== Album appearances ===
- 1980: Ike Turner's Kings Of Rhythm – Ike Turner's Kings Of Rhythm Volume 1 (Ace)
- 2008: Ike Turner – Classic Early Sides 1952-1957 (JSP)
- 2010: Ike Turner – That Kat Sure Could Play! The Singles 1951 To 1957 (Secret)

=== Singles ===
- 1953: "I Stayed Down" / "I Was In St. Louis" (DeLuxe)
- 1955: "The World Is Yours" / "Suffocate" (RPM)
- 1959: "Look At That Chick" / "Gotta Have You For Myself" (Stevens)
- 1977: Wright & Rusin – "I Was In St. Louis"
- 1978: "Coal Shed" / "Johnny's Bad Air Boogie" (Hi-Way)
- 1978: "Shut Up" / "Move" (Hi-Way)
