= Billy "The Kid" Emerson =

Musical artist (1925–2023)

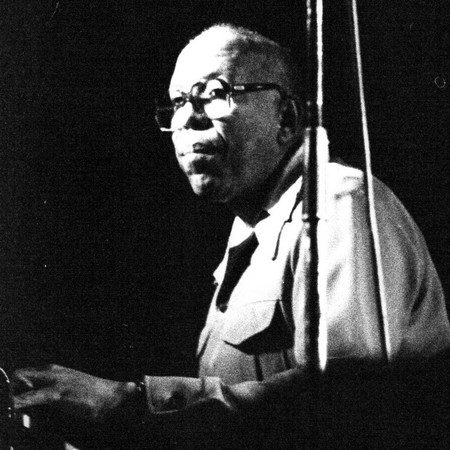
- Emerson in 1979

Background information
- Born: William Robert Emerson; December 21, 1925; Tarpon Springs, Florida, U.S.
- Died: April 25, 2023 (aged 97) Tarpon Springs, Florida, U.S.
- Genres: Rock and roll, R&B
- Occupations: Singer, songwriter, preacher
- Instruments: Vocals, piano
- Years active: 1945–2000s
- Labels: Sun; Vee Jay; Chess; Mad; M-Pac!; USA; Tarpon; Constellation; Rooster
- Formerly of: Ike Turner; Kings of Rhythm; Phineas Newborn

William Robert Emerson (December 21, 1925 – April 25, 2023), known during his recording career as Billy "The Kid" Emerson and more recently as Rev. William R. Emerson, was an American R&B and rock and roll singer and songwriter turned preacher, best known for his 1955 song, "Red Hot."

Emerson began recording after joining Ike Turner's Kings of Rhythm in the early 1950s. He recorded for various labels, including Sun, Chess, and Vee-Jay, before forming his own, Tarpon Records, where he recorded Denise LaSalle and Matt "Guitar" Murphy. He has worked with blues musicians, such as Earl Hooker, Lonnie Brooks, Sonny Boy Williamson II, and Robert Knighthawk.

== Life and career ==
Emerson was born in Tarpon Springs, Florida, on December 21, 1925. He learned the piano in church, playing in various local bands. In 1943, he joined the United States Navy. After World War II, he resumed playing around Tampa with acts such as Ivory Mitchell, the Billy Battle Band, and Alfonso Brown Band. Following a spell in one group where the members dressed as outlaws, he picked up the nickname "Billy The Kid."

Emerson received an athletic scholarship to attend Florida A&M University, but left to join the United States Air Force during the Korean War in 1952. While stationed in Greenville, Mississippi, he met bandleader Ike Turner, who recruited him into his Kings of Rhythm. Turner, a talent scout for Sun Records, arranged a session for Emerson. His first single, "No Teasing Around" / "If Lovin' Is Believing," was released in February 1954. He released another single backed by Turner on guitar before leaving his band and joining a group led by Phineas Newborn. He stayed with Sun as a songwriter, writing and recording "When It Rains, It Really Pours", later recorded by Elvis Presley, and "Red Hot," which later became a hit for both Billy Lee Riley and Bob Luman, and for Robert Gordon and Link Wray, but was not a commercial success for Emerson himself.

In late 1955, he joined Vee-Jay Records in Chicago, making records such as "Every Woman I Know (Crazy 'Bout Automobiles)", released a year later but with little commercial success. The song was subsequently covered in 1965 by Sam the Sham and the Pharaohs on their Wooly Bully album and by Ry Cooder on his 1980 album Borderline. Soon afterwards, Emerson joined Chess Records as the recording manager. He recorded "Holy Mackerel Baby" on the Chess label and a remake of "Woodchuck," an earlier Sun single. He also released a single with Willie Dixon's band.

As a songwriter, Emerson wrote dozens of songs for artists such as Junior Wells, Willie Mabon, Wynonie Harris ("Buzzard Luck"), and Buddy Guy.

After recording for several smaller labels, he formed his own Tarpon Records in 1966, releasing Denise LaSalle's debut single and his own records. He also continued to play in clubs and on European blues tours.

In the late 1970s, Emerson decided to dedicate himself to his religion and compose gospel music. In 2005, he was reported as having a church in Oak Park, Illinois, as Rev. William R. Emerson.

In 2009, Bear Family Records released a 33-track compilation album of Emerson's Sun recordings, Red Hot: The Sun Years, Plus. The plus includes his Vee Jay and Chess singles.

Emerson was inducted into the Rockabilly Hall of Fame. Emerson received the 2017 Florida Folk Heritage Award at the Tarpon Springs Heritage Museum for his songwriter, performer, and producer contributions.

Emerson died at a Tarpon Springs nursing home on April 25, 2023, at 97.

== Discography ==
=== Compilation albums ===
- 2009: Red Hot: The Sun Years, Plus (Bear Family Records)

=== Other album appearances ===
- 1967: The Mar-V-Lus Sound of R&B & Soul (President Records)
- 1997: Red Hot About the Blues (Titanic Records)
- 1974: The Sun Story 1952-1968 (Sun Records)
- 1976: Sun - The Roots Of Rock, Volume 3: Delta Rhythm Kings (Charly Records)
- 1984: Sun Records: The Blues Years 1950-1956 (Sun Records)
- 1988: Black Music Originals, Vol. 3 (Sun Records)
- 1989: Black Music Originals, Vol. 4 (Sun Records)
- 1991: The Ultimate Sun Blues Collection (Disky Records)
- 1992: Way After Midnight (Sun Records)
- 1994: The Complete Sun Singles, Vol. 1: From The Vaults (Bear Family Records)
- 1995: The Complete Sun Singles, Vol. 2: From The Vaults (Bear Family Records)
- 1998: Chicago Soul Cellar (Rare Soul Uncovered from M-Pac! Records) (Charly Records)
- 2001: The Kings of Rhythm featuring Ike Turner: The Sun Sessions (Varèse Sarabande)
- 2004: Vee Jay Records - Chicago Hit Factory (Charly Records)
- 2010: Ike Turner: That Kat Sure Could Play! The Singles 1951-1957 (Secret Records Limited)

=== Singles ===
- 1954: "No Teasing Around" / "If Lovin' Is Believing" (Sun 195)
- 1954: "The Woodchuck" / "I'm Not Going Home" (Sun 203)
- 1955: "Move Baby Move" / "When It Rains It Pours" (Sun 214)
- 1955: "Red Hot" / "No Greater Love" (Sun 219)
- 1955: "Something For Nothing" / "Little Fine Healthy Thing" (Sun 233)
- 1956: "Don't Start Me To Lying" / "You Won't Stay Home" (Vee-Jay 175)
- 1956: "Tomorrow Never Comes" / "Every Woman I Know" (Vee-Jay 219)
- 1957: "Somebody Show Me" / "The Pleasure Is All Mine" (Vee-Jay 247)
- 1957: "You Never Miss The Water" / "Do Yourself A Favor" (Vee-Jay 261)
- 1958: "Give Me A Little Love" / "Woodchuck" (Chess 1711)
- 1959: "Holy Mackerel Baby" / "Believe Me" (Chess 1728)
- 1959: "I'll Get You, Too" / "Um Hum, My Baby" with Willie Dixon's Band (Chess 1940)
- 1962: "I Never Get Enough" / "When It Rains It Pours" (Mad 1301)
- 1963: "The Whip (Part 1)" / "The Whip (Part 2)" (M-Pac! 7207)
- 1963: "I Get That Feeling" / "Hot Spring Water" (USA 751)
- 1964: "I Took It So Hard / When It Rains It Pours" (USA 777)
- 1965: "Aunt Molly, Part 1" / "Aunt Molly, Part 2" (Constellation 148)
- 1965: "I Took It So Hard" / "Every Woman I Know" (Chirrup 0002)
- 1965: "I Took It So Hard" / "Every Woman I Know" (Tarpon 6601) reissue
- 1966: "A Dancin' Whippersnapper" / "The Whip (Part 2)" (Tarpon 6602)
- 1967: "It's Gonna Work Out Fine" / "Zulu" (Tarpon 6604)
- 1967: "When It Rains It Pours" / "It Do Me So Good" (Tarpon 6606)
- 1968: "I Did The Funky Broadway (Part 1)" / "I Did The Funky Broadway (Part 2)" (Tarpon 6607)
- 1980: "A Dancin' Whippersnapper" / "Zulu" (Rooster 44)
