= A Black Man's Soul =

Studio album by Ike Turner
- Released: April 1969
- Genre: Soul
- Length: 33:00
- Label: Pompeii; London
- Producer: Ike & Tina Turner

Ike Turner chronology
Rocks The Blues (1963)	A Black Man's Soul (1969)	Blues Roots (1972)

Singles from A Black Man's Soul
- 1. "Thinking Black" Released: 1969

Professional ratings
Review scores
Source	Rating
Allmusic	3.5/5 stars
Billboard	4/4 stars

A Black Man's Soul is an instrumental album by musician Ike Turner & the Kings of Rhythm. It was released on Pompeii Records in 1969. The album earned Turner a Grammy nomination for Best R&B Instrumental Performance.

== Recording and release ==
A Black Man's Soul contains songs composed by Ike Turner with contributions from fellow St. Louis musician Oliver Sain.The album was recorded during Turner's free time while he was touring with the Ike & Tina Turner Revue. All tracks were recorded at various studios in the U.S. between tour dates. The album was released on the Dallas-based label Pompeii in April 1969. It was distributed by London Records in the Netherlands.

A Black Man's Soul exposed a side of Turner's music not as popular with his audiences of the time. While Ike & Tina Turner's repertoire up to that point relied heavily on vocal harmonies and popular soul influences, these tracks reflected a more traditional and simple funk popularized by acts such as Charles Wright & the Watts 103rd Street Rhythm Band, Baby Huey, The Bar-Kays and Brother Jack McDuff among others.

One single was released, "Thinking Black" / "Black Angel" (ST-100), distributed by Sterling Award Records in association with Pompeii Records.

== Critical reception ==
The album received positive reviews. Bill E. Burk wrote for the Memphis Press-Scimitar (May 23, 1969):

Ike Turner and The Kings of Rhythm show again why they pack the house at Club Paradise each time they come to Memphis. The group really digs out with an uptempo soul, the better selections being "Funky Mule," "Thinking Black," "Black Beauty," which you must wonder whether it is dedicated to Ike's wife, Tina, and Rufus Thomas' all-time soulful favorite, "Philly Dog."

== Awards and nominations ==
A Black Man's Soul was nominated for Best R&B Instrumental Performance at the 12th Annual Grammy Awards in 1970.

== Reissues ==
A Black Man's Soul was released as Funky Mule (1975) by DJM Records in the UK and as Ike Turner & His Kings of Rhythm by Bellaphon Records in Germany. In 2003, the album was reissued on CD with four bonus tracks, including three with vocals from Tina Turner. It was digitally remastered and included in the 3-CD compilation The Complete Pompeii Recordings 1968-1969 released from Goldenlane Records in 2016.

== Sampling ==
- Los Angeles hip-hop group Jurassic 5 sampled "Getting Nasty" in the track "Concrete Schoolyard" on their self-titled EP.

== Track listing ==
All tracks composed by Ike Turner; except where indicated.

Side A
No.	Title	Writer(s)	Length
1.	"Thinking Black"		2:41
2.	"Black Beauty"		2:21
3.	"Ghetto Funk"		2:33
4.	"Blacks' Alley"	Oliver Sain	2:44
5.	"Black Angel"	Oliver Sain	3:15
6.	"Getting Nasty"		3:08

Side B
No.	Title	Writer(s)	Length
1.	"Funky Mule"	Marvin Holmes	3:22
2.	"Philly Dog"	Rufus Thomas	2:24
3.	"Scotty Souling"		2:59
4.	"Up Hard"	Art Jerry Miller	2:40
5.	"Nuttin' Up"		2:25
6.	"Freedom Sound"		2:38

== Personnel ==
- Ike Turner - guitar, piano

The Kings of Rhythm

- Jesse Knight - guitar
- Mack Johnson - drums
- Tommy "Teasky" Tribble - percussion
- Fred Sample - piano
- Washee - saxophone
- Jesse Heron - trombone

Technical

- Loring Eutemey - cover design
