= Rocket 88 =

Song first recorded by Jackie Brenston with Ike Turner in 1951

"Rocket "88""

Single by Jackie Brenston and his Delta Cats
- B-side: "Come Back Where You Belong"
- Released: March 1951
- Recorded: March 3 or 5, 1951
- Studio: Memphis Recording Service (Memphis)
- Genre: Rock and roll; R&B; jump blues
- Length: 2:48
- Label: Chess
- Songwriters: Jackie Brenston (credited); Ike Turner (uncredited)
- Producer: Sam Phillips

Jackie Brenston and his Delta Cats singles chronology
"Rocket "88"" (1951)	"My Real Gone Rocket" (1951)

Audio sample
- file; help

"Rocket 88" (originally stylized as Rocket "88") is a song that was first recorded in Memphis, Tennessee, in March 1951. The recording was credited to "Jackie Brenston and his Delta Cats"; while Brenston did provide the vocals, the band was actually Ike Turner and his Kings of Rhythm. The single reached number one on the Billboard R&B chart.

Many music writers acknowledge its importance in the development of rock and roll music, with several considering it to be the first rock and roll record. In 2017, the Mississippi Blues Trail dedicated its 200th marker to "Rocket 88" as an influential record. The song was inducted into the Blues Hall of Fame in 1991, the Grammy Hall of Fame in 1998, the Rock and Roll Hall of Fame in 2018, and the National Recording Registry in 2024.

== Composition and recording ==
The original version of the twelve-bar blues song was credited to Jackie Brenston and his Delta Cats, which reached number one on the R&B charts. Brenston was Ike Turner's saxophonist and the Delta Cats were actually Turner's Kings of Rhythm back-up band, who rehearsed at the Riverside Hotel in Clarksdale, Mississippi. Brenston sang the lead vocal and is officially listed as the songwriter. Turner led the band and is credited in some sources as the composer.

Brenston later said that the song was not particularly original; "they had simply borrowed from another jump blues about an automobile, Jimmy Liggins’ 'Cadillac Boogie'". The song was a hymn of praise to the joys of the Oldsmobile Rocket 88 automobile which had recently been introduced, and was based on the 1947 song "Cadillac Boogie" by Jimmy Liggins and the 1948 song "Rocket Boogie "88"" by Pete Johnson.

Drawing on the template of jump blues and swing combo music, Turner made the style even rawer, superimposing Brenston's enthusiastic vocals, his own piano, distorted guitar played by Willie Kizart (the first use of such a sound on record), and tenor saxophone solos by 17-year-old Raymond Hill. Willie Sims played drums for the recording.

A review of the record in Time magazine included:

Rocket 88 was brash and it was sexy; it took elements of the blues, hammered them with rhythm and attitude and electric guitar, and reimagined black music into something new. If the blues seemed to give voice to old wisdom, this new music seemed full of youthful notions. If the blues was about squeezing cathartic joy out of the bad times, this new music was about letting the good times roll. If the blues was about earthly troubles, the rock that Turner's crew created seemed to shout that the sky was now the limit.

The legend of how the sound came about says that Kizart's amplifier was damaged on Highway 61 when the band was driving from Mississippi to Memphis, Tennessee. An attempt was made to hold the cone in place by stuffing the amplifier with wadded newspapers, which unintentionally created a distorted sound; Phillips liked the sound and used it. Peter Guralnick, in his biography of Sam Phillips, stated that the amplifier was dropped from the car's trunk when it had gotten a flat tire and the band were retrieving the spare.

Phillips offered this reminiscence about the amp in an interview with Rolling Stone: "The bass amplifier fell off the car. And when we got in the studio, the woofer had burst; the cone had burst. So I stuck the newspaper and some sack paper in it, and that's where we got that sound". Afterwards, Phillips had no complaints about the unusual effect the "fix" had created. "The more unconventional it sounded, the more interested I would become in it."

The song was recorded in the Memphis studio of producer Sam Phillips in March 1951, and licensed to Chess Records for release. The record was supposed to be credited to Ike Turner and his Kings of Rhythm featuring Jackie Brenston, but Jackie Brenston and his Delta Cats was printed instead. Turner blamed Phillips for this error since he was the one who licensed it to Chess. Turner and the band were only paid $20 each (US$248 in 2025 dollars) for the record, with the exception of Brenston who sold the rights to Phillips for $910.

Whether this was the first record of the rock'n'roll genre is debated. A 2014 article in The Guardian stated that "Rocket 88's reputation may have more to do with Sam Phillips's vociferous later claims he had discovered rock'n'roll". Time quotes The New Rolling Stone Encyclopedia of Rock & Roll and the Rock and Roll Hall of Fame as confirming that "Rocket 88 may well have been the first rock 'n' roll record".

In a later interview, however, Ike Turner offered this comment: "I don't think that 'Rocket 88' is rock 'n' roll. I think that 'Rocket 88' is R&B, but I think 'Rocket 88' is the cause of rock and roll existing".

== Chart performance ==
"Rocket 88" was the third-biggest rhythm and blues single in jukebox plays of 1951, according to Billboard magazine, and ninth in record sales. The single reached the top of the Best Selling R&B Records chart on June 9, 1951, and stayed there for three weeks. It also spent two weeks at the top of the Most Played Juke Box R&B Records chart; spending a total of five weeks at number-one on the R&B charts.

== Influence ==
"When I was a little boy, that song fascinated me in a big way. I never heard a piano sound like that. I never played the piano then. Soon, I was trying. if you listen to 'Good Golly, Miss Molly,' you hear the same introduction as the one to 'Rocket 88,' the exact same, ain't nothing been changed."

— Little Richard (1999)

Ike Turner's piano intro on "Rocket 88" influenced Little Richard who later used it for his 1958 hit song "Good Golly, Miss Molly”.

Sam Philips, the founder of Sun Records and Sun Studio, and many writers have suggested that "Rocket 88" has strong claims to be called the first rock'n'roll record. Others take a more nuanced view. Charlie Gillett, writing in 1970 in The Sound of the City, said that it was "one of several records that people in the music business cite as 'the first rock'n'roll record.'" It has been suggested by Larry Birnbaum that the idea that "Rocket 88" could be called "the first rock'n'roll record" first arose in the late 1960s; he argued that: "One of the reasons is surely that Kizart's broken amp anticipated the sound of the fuzzbox, which was in its heyday when 'Rocket 88' was rediscovered."

Music historian Robert Palmer, writing in The Rolling Stone History of Rock & Roll in 1980, described it as an important and influential record. He noted that Hill's saxophone playing was "wilder and rougher" than on many jump blues records, and also emphasized the record's "fuzzed-out, overamplified electric guitar". Writing in his 1984 book Unsung Heroes of Rock ‘n’ Roll, Nick Tosches, though rejecting the idea that it could be described as the first rock'n'roll record "any more than there is any first modern novel – the fact remains that the record in question was possessed of a sound and a fury the sheer, utter newness of which set it apart from what had come before." Echoing this view, Bill Dahl at AllMusic wrote:

Determining the first actual rock & roll record is a truly impossible task. But you can't go too far wrong citing Jackie Brenston's 1951 Chess waxing of "Rocket 88", is a seminal piece of rock's fascinating history with all the prerequisite elements firmly in place: practically indecipherable lyrics about cars, booze, and women; Raymond Hill's booting tenor sax, and a churning, beat-heavy rhythmic bottom.

Rock art historian Paul Grushkin wrote:

Working from the raw material of post-big band jump blues, Turner had cooked up a mellow, cruising boogie with a steady-as-she-goes back beat now married to Brenston's enthusiastic, sexually suggestive vocals that spoke of opportunity, discovery and conquest. This all combined to create (as one reviewer later put it) "THE mother of all R&B songs for an evolutionary white audience".

Michael Campbell wrote, in Popular Music in America: And the Beat Goes On:

Both the distortion and the relative prominence of the guitar were novel features of this recording – these are the elements that have earned "Rocket 88" so many nominations as "the first" rock and roll record. From our perspective, "Rocket 88" wasn't the first rock and roll record, because the beat is a shuffle rhythm, not the distinctive rock rhythm heard first in the songs of Chuck Berry and Little Richard. Still, the distortion and the central place of the guitar in the overall sound certainly anticipate key features of rock style.

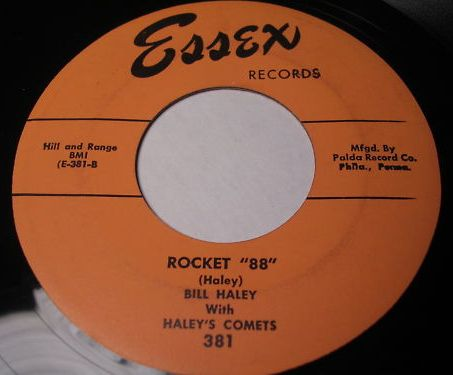
Bill Haley's version of Rocket 88

Ike Turner himself said, in an interview with Holger Petersen:

I don't think that "Rocket 88" is rock'n'roll. I think that "Rocket 88" is R&B, but I think "Rocket 88" is the cause of rock and roll existing ... Sam Phillips got Dewey Phillips to play "Rocket 88" on his program – and this is like the first black record to be played on a white radio station – and, man, all the white kids broke out to the record shops to buy it. So that's when Sam Phillips got the idea, "Well, man, if I get me a white boy to sound like a black boy, then I got me a gold mine", which is the truth. So, that's when he got Elvis and he got Jerry Lee Lewis and a bunch of other guys and so they named it rock and roll rather than R&B and so this is the reason I think rock and roll exists – not that "Rocket 88" was the first one, but that was what caused the first one.

The song was covered by several artists over the years, the first being Bill Haley & His Comets in July 1951. No matter which version deserves the accolade, "Rocket 88" is seen as a prototype rock and roll song in musical style and lineup, as well as its lyrical theme, in which an automobile serves as a metaphor for sexual prowess.

== Album appearances ==
The song appears on the 1959 compilation album Oldies in Hi Fi (Chess LP 1439), on the 1983 Charly Records compilation Red Hot and Blue (a tribute to 1950s Memphis DJ Dewey Phillips), and on the 1987 compilation The Best of Chess Rock 'N' Roll (Chess CH2-6024).

== Bibliography ==
- Birnbaum, Larry (2012). Before Elvis: The Prehistory of Rock 'n' Roll. Lanham, Massachusetts: Scarecrow Press. ISBN 978-0810886384.
- Campbell, Michael (2011). Popular Music in America: And The Beat Goes On (4th ed.). Boston, Massachusetts: Cengage Learning. ISBN 978-0810886384.
- Collis, John (2003). Ike Turner: King of Rhythm. London: Do Not Press. ISBN 978-1-904316-24-4.
- Dawson, Jim; Propes, Steve (1992). What Was the First Rock 'n' Roll Record?. London: Faber & Faber. ISBN 0-571-12939-0.
- Gillett, Charlie (1970). The Sound of the City. Sphere Books. ISBN 978-0722138601.
- Guralnick, Peter (1994). Last Train to Memphis: The Rise of Elvis Presley. New York City: Little Brown. ISBN 978-0316332200.
- Guralnick, Peter (2015). Sam Phillips: The Man Who Invented Rock 'N' Roll. New York City: Little Brown.
- Grushkin, Paul (2006). Rockin' Down the Highway: The Cars and People That Made Rock Roll. MBI Publishing. ISBN 978-0760322925.
- Palmer, Robert (1981a). The Rolling Stone History of Rock & Roll. Picador.
- Palmer, Robert (1981b). Deep Blues. Penguin Books. ISBN 978-0-14-006223-6.
- Palmer, Robert (1995). Rock & Roll: An Unruly History. Harmony Books. ISBN 0-517-70050-6.
- Petersen, Holger (2011). Talking Music: Blues Radio and Roots Music. Insomniac Press. ISBN 978-1554830589.
- Shepard, John (2003). Continuum Encyclopedia of Popular Music of the World: Performance and Production. Vol. II. Continuum International. ISBN 978-0826463227.
- Tosches, Nick (1984). Unsung Heroes of Rock'n'Roll. Secker & Warburg.
- Turner, Ike; Cawthorne, Nigel (1999). Takin' Back My Name: The Confessions of Ike Turner. London: Virgin. ISBN 185-2278501.
- Turner, Tina; Loder, Kurt (1986). I, Tina: My Life Story (1st ed.). New York City: Morrow. ISBN 978-0688059491.
- Weinstein, Deena (2015). Rock'n America: A Social and Cultural History. Toronto: University of Toronto Press. ISBN 9781442600188.
- Whitburn, Joel (1988). Top R&B Singles 1942–1988. Menomonee Falls, Wisconsin: Record Research. ISBN 0-89820-068-7.
