= Stevens Records =

- Founded: 1959
- Founder: Bill Stevens and Fred Stevens
- Status: Defunct
- Genre: R&B, rock and roll
- Location: Granite City, Illinois, U.S.

Stevens Records was a record label operated by father-and-son, Fred and Bill Stevens in Granite City, Illinois. Fred Stevens, a painter and his son Bill Stevens, an R&B enthusiast, were inspired by the thriving music scene in St. Louis and the neighboring East St. Louis, but they felt there was a lack of artists recording locally so they started their own label in 1959. The label is best known for their recordings of musician Ike Turner, who recorded under the name Icky Renrut because he was still under contract with Sun Records.

== Discography ==
Catalog No.	Release date	Single (A-side, B-side)	Artist	Notes
1001	Mar 1959	A: "Look At That Chick" B: "Gotta Have You For Myself"	Johnny Wright	Cash Box review (Apr 4, 1959) Billboard review (Apr 6, 1959)
102	Apr 1959	A: "I Woke Up One Morning" B: "Shirley Can't You See"	Little Bobby Foster With The Premiers	Cash Box review (May 2, 1959)
103	May 1959	A: "It's So Hard To Say Goodnite" B: "Cherokee Rock"	Chuck Wheeler	Billboard reviews (May 11, 1959) Cash Box review (Jul 4, 1959)
104	1959	A: "Jack Rabbit" B: "In Your Eyes Baby"	Icky Renrut	
105	1959	A: "Moving Slow" B: "Evening Train"	Little Cooper And The Drifters	
106	1959	A: "Angel Of Love" B: "Star Above"	Bobby Foster And Orchestra	
107	Sep 1959	A: "Ho–Ho" B: "Hey–Hey"	Icky Renrut	Billboard review (Sep 7, 1959)
