= Jackie Brenston =

American singer, saxophonist, and pioneer of rock and roll

- Brenston (right) with Ike Turner

Background information
- Born: August 24, 1928 or 1930; Clarksdale, Mississippi, U.S.
- Died: December 15, 1979 (aged 49–51) Memphis, Tennessee, U.S.
- Genres: R&B; blues; rock and roll
- Occupation: Musician
- Instruments: Vocals, saxophone
- Years active: 1950–1960s
- Labels: Chess; Federal; Sue

Jackie Brenston (August 24, 1928 or 1930 (Note: Most published sources and the U.S. Social Security Death Index give 1930 as his year of birth. The U.S. Department of Veterans Affairs and reportedly his gravestone give 1928.) – December 15, 1979) was an American singer and saxophonist who, with Ike Turner's band, recorded the first version of "Rocket 88" in 1951. It was noted in a subsequent interview that Brenston stated "I had a hit record and no sense".

== Biography ==
Brenston was born in Clarksdale, Mississippi. Brenston's birth date has long been the source of speculation. The birth date on his headstone, August 24, 1928, is the same date on his army enlistment records. However, in 1974, Brenston stated that he was born on August 24, 1927. His obituary in the Clarksdale Press Register gave his birth date as August 15, 1930, a date endorsed by researchers Bob Eagle and Eric S. LeBlanc. Brenston had a troubled youth and often ran away from home. It has been theorized that his mother, Ethel Brenston, falsified his age so that he could join the army. Brenston claimed he served more than three years in the 82nd Airborne, but records show that he enlisted on January 19, 1946, and was released on December 18, 1946.

Returning to Clarksdale from army service, Brenston learned to play the tenor saxophone and linked up with Ike Turner in 1950 as a tenor sax player and occasional singer in Turner's band, the Kings of Rhythm. The local success of the band prompted B. B. King to recommend them to studio owner Sam Phillips in Memphis, Tennessee, where the band made several recordings in early March 1951, including "Rocket 88", on which Brenston sang lead and was credited with writing. Turner led the band but provided no vocals for "Rocket 88". Brenston later said that the song was not particularly original; "they had simply borrowed from another jump blues about an automobile, Jimmy Liggins' "Cadillac Boogie" ". Turner continued to maintain that he wrote the music and that he and the band jointly wrote the lyrics.

Phillips licensed the recordings to Chess Records in Chicago, which released "Rocket 88" as by Jackie Brenston and his Delta Cats instead of Ike Turner and his Kings of Rhythm featuring Jackie Brenston. Turner blamed Phillips for this error. The record soon reached number one on the U.S. Billboard R&B chart. It sold approximately half a million copies. Turner and the band had been paid $20 each for the record. The exception was Brenston, who sold the rights to Phillips for $910.

Phillips later claimed that this was the first rock and roll record. While there are many other records that are also said to be the "first", many sources confirm that "Rocket 88" was certainly among the first of the rock 'n' roll genre. Phillips used income from the success of the record to start Sun Records the following year.

The success of the record caused friction within the group. After one further recording session, Brenston left Turner's band to pursue a solo career. Brenston later went on to perform in Lowell Fulson's band for two years. He returned to play in Turner's band in 1955. Although he occasionally sang with the band, Turner allegedly barred him from singing "Rocket 88".

In 1958, Brenston played saxophone in the Cobra session with Turner which produced the singles "Double Trouble" and "All Your Love (I Miss Loving)" by Otis Rush. By now an alcoholic, Brenston continued playing in local bands. In 1960, Turner signed with Sue Records and released "A Fool in Love" with his future wife Tina Turner. Turner wrote one of Brenston's last recordings, "Trouble Up The Road" / "You Ain't The One" was released on Sue in 1961. Brenston's final recording session was in Chicago with Earl Hooker's band in 1963, and released on Mel London's Mel-Lon label, but alcoholism took a toll on his career.

In spite of his brief fame from "Rocket 88", Brenston did not achieve further success in his career. "He never had another hit and became an alcoholic ... Brenston finally quit music, became a truck driver and died forgotten in 1979". He died of a heart attack at V.A. Hospital in Memphis on December 15, 1979.

== Legacy ==
Brenston had a significant influence on Bill Haley and the Comets.

In 2007, Rev-Ola released a compilation of twenty-four vintage sides recorded by Brenston. Of his legacy, the music historian Richie Unterberger wrote,

If ever there were a case of the record overshadowing the artist, it would be Jackie Brenston's 'Rocket 88.' ... Brenston is often dismissed as a footnote to his own landmark, with pianist/bandleader Ike Turner's role in the recording getting more ink, Brenston sometimes characterized as a journeyman who lucked into the spotlight almost by chance. ... [Brenston was] something of a journeyman R&B vocalist, but wasn't as inconsequential as some critics have opined.

== Discography ==
=== Singles ===
- 1951: "Rocket 88" / "Come Back Where You Belong" (Chess 1458) – Jackie Brenston and His Delta Cats
- 1951: "My Real Gone Rocket" / "Tuckered Out" (Chess 1469) – Jackie Brenston and His Delta Cats
- 1951: "Juiced" / "Independent Woman" (Chess 1472) – Jackie Brenston and His Delta Cats
- 1952: "Hi Ho Baby" / "Leo The Louse" (Chess 1496) – Jackie Brenston and His Delta Cats
- 1952: "Blues Got Me Again" / "Starvation" (Chess 1532) – Jackie Brenston and His Delta Cats
- 1956: "What Can It Be" / "Gonna Wait For My Chance" (Federal 12283) – Jackie Brenston With Ike Turner's Kings Of Rhythm
- 1957: "Much Later" / "The Mistreater" (Federal 12291) – Jackie Brenston With Ike Turner's Kings Of Rhythm
- 1961: "Trouble Up The Road" / "You Ain't The One" (Sue 736) – Jackie Brensten With Ike Turner's Orchestra
- 1962: "Want You To Rock Me" / "Down In My Heart" (Mel-Lon 1000) – Jackie Brenston

=== Albums appearances ===
- 1984: Rocket 88: Jackie Brenston & His Delta Kings Featuring Ike Turner (Chess/P-Vine Records)
- 1984: Sun Records: The Blues Years 1950–1956 (Sun Records)
- 1994: The Sue Records Story (EMI Records) 4-CD set
- 1991: Ike Turner, Kings Of Rhythm – Trailblazer (Charly R&B)
- 2004: A Proper Introduction To Ike Turner/Jackie Brenston: Rocket 88 (Proper Records)
- 2007: Jackie Brenston – The Mistreater (Rev-Ola Records)
- 2008: Ike Turner – Classic Early Sides 1952–1957 (JSP Records)
- 2008: Rockin' Memphis (Proper Records)
- 2010: The Legendary Ike Turner – That Kat Sure Could Play! The Singles 1951 To 1957 (Secret Records Limited) 4-CD set
- 2012: Ike Turner – Studio Productions: New Orleans And Los Angeles 1963–1965 (Ace Records)
- 2013: After Sun: What The Stars Of The Legendary Sun Record Company Did Next (Fantastic Voyage Records) 3-CD set
- 2022: Jackie Brenston and his Delta Cats – The Blues Got Me Again: Singles 1951–1962 (Jasmine Records)

== Sources ==
- Dawson, Jim; Propes, Steve. What Was the First Rock'n'Roll Record? ISBN 0-571-12939-0.
- Tosches, Nick. Unsung Heroes of Rock'n'Roll. ISBN 0-436-53203-4.
