= Sun Studio =

Historic recording studio in Memphis, Tennessee, United States

- Sun Record Company, Memphis Recording Service
- U.S. National Register of Historic Places
- U.S. National Historic Landmark
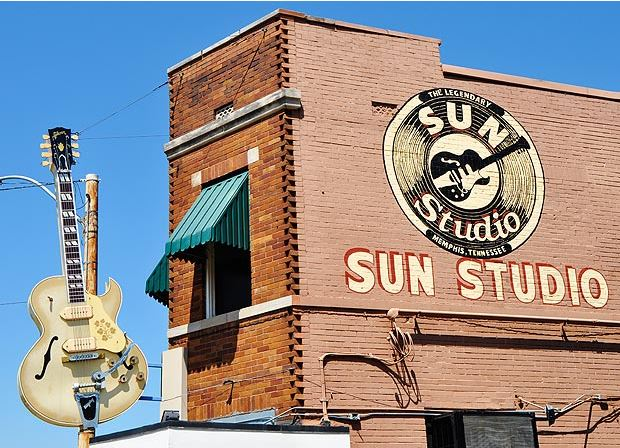
- Sun Studio in 2013

- Location within Tennessee Location within the United States
- Location: 706 Union Avenue, Memphis, Tennessee, U.S.
- Coordinates: 35°8′21.29″N 90°2′15.64″W
- Area: less than one acre
- Built: 1950
- NRHP reference No.: 03001031

Significant dates
- Added to NRHP: July 31, 2003
- Designated NHL: July 31, 2003

Sun Studio is a recording studio opened by rock-and-roll pioneer Sam Phillips at 706 Union Avenue in Memphis, Tennessee, on January 3, 1950. It was originally called Memphis Recording Service, sharing the same building with the Sun Records label business. The Sun label that was housed within the studio played a large role in Elvis Presley's early career.

Reputedly the first rock and roll single, Jackie Brenston and his Delta Cats' "Rocket 88" was recorded there in 1951 with song composer Ike Turner on keyboards, leading the studio to claim status as the birthplace of rock and roll. Blues and R&B artists like Howlin' Wolf, Junior Parker, Little Milton, B.B. King, James Cotton, Rufus Thomas, and Rosco Gordon recorded there in the early 1950s.

Rock and roll, country, and rockabilly artists, including Johnny Cash, Elvis Presley, Carl Perkins, Roy Orbison, Charlie Feathers, Ray Harris, Warren Smith, Ray Smith, Charlie Rich, and Jerry Lee Lewis, recorded there throughout the mid-to-late 1950s until the studio outgrew its Union Avenue location. Sam Phillips opened the larger Sam C. Phillips Recording Studio, better known as Phillips Recording, in 1959 to replace the older facility. Since Phillips had invested in the Holiday Inn Hotel chain earlier, he also recorded artists starting in 1963 on the label Holiday Inn Records for Kemmons Wilson. In 1957, Bill Justis recorded his Grammy Hall of Fame song "Raunchy" for Sam Phillips and worked as a musical director at Sun Records.

In 1969, Sam Phillips sold the label to Shelby Singleton, and there was no recording-related or label-related activity again in the building until the September 1985 Class of '55 recording sessions with Carl Perkins, Roy Orbison, Jerry Lee Lewis, and Johnny Cash, produced by Chips Moman.

In 1987, the original building housing the Sun Records label and Memphis Recording Service was reopened by Gary Hardy as "Sun Studio," a recording label and tourist attraction that has attracted many notable artists, such as U2, Def Leppard, Bonnie Raitt, and Ringo Starr.

== Beginnings and Phillips Records ==
In January 1950, WREC radio engineer Sam Phillips opened the Memphis Recording Service at 706 Union Avenue with his assistant and long-time friend, Marion Keisker. Phillips had dreamed of opening his own recording studio since he was a young man, and now that it was a reality he was overjoyed. However, getting the company off the ground was not an easy task. To create revenue at the beginning, Phillips would record conventions, weddings, choirs, and even funerals. He also held an open door policy, allowing anybody to walk in and, for a small fee, record their own record. Phillips' slogan for his studio was "We Record Anything, Anywhere, Anytime." In June 1950, Phillips and a friend, local DJ Dewey Phillips who was no relation, set up their own record label called Phillips Records. The purpose of the label was to record "negro artists of the South" who wanted to make a recording but had no place to do so. The label failed to make an impact and folded after just one release; "Boogie in the Park" by Joe Hill Louis, which sold less than 400 copies.

=== "Rocket 88" ===
After the failure of Phillips Records, Phillips began working closely with other record labels such as Chess Records and Modern Records, providing demo recordings for them and recording master tapes for their artists. It was during this time that Phillips recorded what many consider to be the first rock and roll song, "Rocket 88" by Jackie Brenston and his Delta Cats, who were actually Ike Turner and his Kings of Rhythm. Some biographers have suggested that it was Phillips' inventive creativeness that led to the song's unique sound, but others put it down to the fact that the amplifier used on the record was broken, leading to a "fuzzy" sound. The Sun Studio tour lends credence to the latter, with the tour guide saying the amplifier was stuffed with wads of newspaper.

== Sun Records ==
In early 1952, Phillips once again launched his own record label, this time calling it Sun Records. During his first year he recorded several artists who would go on to have successful careers. Among them were B.B. King, Joe Hill Louis, Rufus Thomas, and Howlin' Wolf. Despite the number of singers who recorded there, Phillips found it increasingly difficult to keep profits up. He reportedly drove over 60,000 miles in one year to promote his artists with radio stations and distributors. To keep costs down, he would pay his artists three percent royalties instead of the usual five percent that was more common at the time. Phillips turned to alcohol when it looked like his label would once again fail, and he was put into a mental hospital at one point, reportedly getting electric shock treatment.

Rufus Thomas' "Bearcat", a recording that was similar to "Hound Dog", was the first real hit for Sun in 1953. Although the song was the label's first hit, a copyright-infringement suit ensued and nearly bankrupted Phillips' record label. Despite this, Phillips was able to keep his business afloat by recording several other acts, including the Prisonaires, a black quartet who were given permission to leave prison in June 1953 to record their single, "Just Walkin' in the Rain", later a hit for Johnnie Ray in 1956. The song was a big enough hit that the local newspaper took an interest in the story of its recording. A few biographers have said that this article, printed in the Memphis Press-Scimitar on July 15, influenced Elvis Presley to seek out Sun to record a demo record.

== Elvis Presley ==
In August 1953, fresh out of his high school graduation the previous June, the 18½ year old Presley walked into the offices of Sun. He aimed to pay for a few minutes of studio time to record a two-sided acetate disc: "My Happiness" and "That's When Your Heartaches Begin". He would later claim he intended the record as a gift for his mother, or was merely interested in what he "sounded like", though there was a much cheaper, amateur record-making service at a nearby general store. Biographer Peter Guralnick argues that he chose Sun in the hope of being discovered. Asked by receptionist Marion Keisker what kind of singer he was, Presley responded, "I sing all kinds." When she pressed him on whom he sounded like, he repeatedly answered, "I don't sound like nobody." After he recorded, Phillips asked Keisker to note down the young man's name, which she did along with her own commentary: "Good ballad singer. Hold." Presley cut a second acetate in January 1954—"I'll Never Stand In Your Way" and "It Wouldn't Be the Same Without You"—but again nothing came of it.

Phillips, meanwhile, was always on the lookout for someone who could bring the sound of the black musicians on whom Sun focused to a broader audience. As Keisker reported, "Over and over I remember Sam saying, 'If I could find a white man who had the Negro sound and the Negro feel, I could make a billion dollars.'" In June, he acquired a demo recording of a ballad, "Without You", that he thought might suit the teenaged singer. Presley came by the studio, but was unable to do it justice. Despite this, Phillips asked Presley to sing as many numbers as he knew. He was sufficiently affected by what he heard to invite two local musicians, guitarist Winfield "Scotty" Moore and upright bass player Bill Black, to work something up with Presley for a recording session.

The session, held the evening of July 5, proved entirely unfruitful until late in the night. As they were about to give up and go home, Presley took his guitar and launched into a 1946 blues number, Arthur Crudup's "That's All Right". Moore recalled, "All of a sudden, Elvis just started singing this song, jumping around and acting the fool, and then Bill picked up his bass, and he started acting the fool, too, and I started playing with them. Sam, I think, had the door to the control booth open ... he stuck his head out and said, 'What are you doing?' And we said, 'We don't know.' 'Well, back up,' he said, 'try to find a place to start, and do it again.'" Phillips quickly began taping; this was the sound he had been looking for. Three days later, popular Memphis DJ Dewey Phillips played "That's All Right" on his Red, Hot, and Blue show. Listeners began phoning in, eager to find out who the singer was. The interest was such that Phillips played the record repeatedly during the last two hours of his show. Interviewing Presley on-air, Phillips asked him what high school he attended in order to clarify his color for the many callers who had assumed he was black. During the next few days the trio recorded a bluegrass number, Bill Monroe's "Blue Moon of Kentucky", again in a distinctive style and employing a jury-rigged echo effect that Sam Phillips dubbed "slapback". A single was pressed with "That's All Right" on the A side and "Blue Moon of Kentucky" on the reverse.

=== Selling Presley ===
Within months Phillips saw his label expand significantly owing to the number of Presley records sold. Radio stations and record stores all over the South were eager to play them, and as Presley's profile grew over the next year, Phillips realized Sun was not large enough to break him throughout the United States. In February 1955, Phillips met with Colonel Tom Parker, a man known for his hustling skills as well as his managerial ones. Parker persuaded Phillips that Presley needed a national record label to help him further his career, and after several more months Phillips agreed to sell Presley's contract. He told Parker that he would require a $5,000 down-payment by November 15, as an advance on a $35,000 buy out fee. At the time, $35,000 was an unheard of amount of money for a recording artist's contract, especially one who had yet to prove himself on the national stage.

Although Presley didn't want to leave Sun, according to Sun engineer Jack Clement, Phillips sold his contract because he needed the money to settle debts and pay off costs still associated with Rufus Thomas's "Bearcat" copyright-infringement suit. Phillips, however, insisted that he only offered Presley's contract for $35,000 because he believed it would put off any other record label from purchasing it. Regardless, Presley signed a record contract with RCA Victor in November 1955, and left Sun. Phillips used some of the money to further advance the careers of his other artists, by now featuring Johnny Cash, Carl Perkins, Jerry Lee Lewis, and Roy Orbison.

=== Million Dollar Quartet ===
On December 4, 1956, an impromptu jam session among Elvis Presley, Jerry Lee Lewis, Carl Perkins, and Johnny Cash took place at Sun Studio. The jam session seems to have happened by pure chance. Perkins, who by this time had already met success with "Blue Suede Shoes", had come into the studio that day, accompanied by his brothers Clayton and Jay and by drummer W.S. Holland, their aim being to cut some new material, including a revamped version of an old blues song, "Matchbox". Phillips, who wished to try to fatten this sparse rockabilly instrumentation, had brought in his latest acquisition, singer and piano man extraordinaire Jerry Lee Lewis, still unknown outside Memphis, to play piano on the Perkins session.

Sometime in the early afternoon, Presley dropped in to pay a casual visit accompanied by a girlfriend, Marilyn Evans. He was, at the time, the biggest name in show business, having hit the top of the singles charts five times, and topping the album charts twice in the preceding 12-month period. Less than four months earlier, he had appeared on The Ed Sullivan Show, pulling an unheard-of 83% of the television audience, which was estimated at 55 million, the largest in history up to that time.

After chatting with Philips in the control room, Presley listened to the playback of Perkins’ session, which he pronounced to be good. Then he went out into the studio and some time later the jam session began. At some point during the session, Sun artist Johnny Cash, who had recently enjoyed a few hits on the country charts, popped in. (Cash wrote in his autobiography Cash that he had been first to arrive at the Sun Studio that day, wanting to listen in on the Perkins recording session.) "Cowboy" Jack Clement was engineering that day and remembers saying to himself "I think I'd be remiss not to record this" and so he did. After jamming through a number of songs using someone else's guitar for an hour, Elvis and girlfriend Evans slipped out as Jerry Lee pounded away on the piano. Cash claims in Cash that "no one wanted to follow Jerry Lee, not even Elvis."

During the session Phillips spotted an opportunity for some publicity and called a local newspaper, the Memphis Press-Scimitar. Bob Johnson, the newspaper's entertainment editor, came over to the studio accompanied by a UPI representative named Leo Soroca and a photographer.

The following day, an article, written by Johnson about the session, was published in the Memphis Press-Scimitar under the title "Million Dollar Quartet". The article contained the now-famous photograph of Presley seated at the piano surrounded by Lewis, Perkins and Cash (the uncropped version of the photo also includes Evans, shown seated atop the piano). This photo proves Cash was there, but the audio doesn't provide substantial proof he joined in on the session.

== Decline ==
For several years after Presley left Sun, Phillips had success with other acts. Sun Studio became known as a place that nurtured talent and then encouraged it to expand with bigger labels. In 1959, Phillips moved Sun Studio to larger premises at 639 Madison Avenue. By the mid-1960s, Phillips had lost interest in recording and had instead branched out into radio. He opened several radio stations, beginning in the late 1950s, and Sun lost its reputation as an innovative recording studio. In 1968, Sun released its last record. In 1969, Mercury Records label producer Shelby Singleton – noted for producing the Ray Stevens' hit "Ahab the Arab" in 1962, and later Jeannie C. Riley's 1968 hit single "Harper Valley PTA" on his Nashville-based Plantation Records label – purchased the Sun label from Phillips. Singleton merged his operations into Sun International Corporation, which re-released and re-packaged compilations of Sun's early artists in the early 1970s. Singleton moved the firm to Nashville, and sold the building to a plumbing company, who eventually sold it to an auto parts store, which used the original recording studio for inventory storage.

Since, Sun Records Studio has been used as a setting for the film biopics Walk the Line, Great Balls of Fire, Mystery Train and Elvis.

== Re-opening ==
In 1987, ten years after Presley died, Sun Studio at 706 Union Avenue was converted back into a recording studio, and soon became a tourist attraction for Presley fans and music lovers in general. The studio was also used by several well known acts to record, including U2, Def Leppard, John Mellencamp, the Bogus Bros. and Chris Isaak & Silvertone to name a few. In 2003 it was officially recognized as a National Historic Landmark tourist attraction.

In May 2009, Canadian blues artist JW-Jones recorded with blues legend Hubert Sumlin, Larry Taylor and Richard Innes at the studio. In July 2009, John Mellencamp recorded nine songs for his album No Better Than This at the studio. In 2011, Chris Isaak released "Beyond the Sun," a collection of songs recorded at Sun Studio, most of which are cover versions of songs originally released on Sun Records.

Sun Studio regularly releases studio session podcasts on YouTube and on Public Television. Sun Studio announced that PBS affiliate stations would be showing a 30-minute series of Sun Studio Sessions starting in January 2010.

== See also ==
- List of museums in Tennessee
- List of National Historic Landmarks in Tennessee
- National Register of Historic Places listings in Shelby County, Tennessee
