= Charly Records =

British record label

Charly Records is a British record label that specialises in reissued material.

Among the labels whose original releases are reissued by Charly are Vee-Jay, Sun, Immediate, BYG, Tomato, Fania, Treasure Isle, Beverley's, Soul City and Giorgio Gomelsky Productions and distributing albums from artists such as Small Faces, Funkadelic, The Yardbirds, Bob Marley & The Wailers, and 13th Floor Elevators.

== History ==
Charly Records was founded in France in 1974 by Jean-Luc Young, who had been a promoter of teen concerts but moved to the UK in 1975. In 1977 Charly started a jazz subsidiary, Affinity Records.

Charly Records began as the UK reissue label for Chess in the mid-1970s. Charly was originally known mainly for American-originated jazz and other modern oddities, such as the Bollock Brothers, but it is now mainly an album-oriented "retro" label. The Charly R&B imprint became another important sub-label, focusing on vintage blues and soul releases and themed compilations. Its most obvious rivals are Rhino and See for Miles (a label that Charly distributed in the 1980s).

When the label began issuing CDs in the mid-1980s, they were typically of poor-to-fair quality with a lot of surface noise.

In Europe, between approx. 2007 and 2020 Charly was distributed by Snapper Records, while licensing was and is through LicenseMusic.com.

The label produces Americana, blues, funk, gospel, jazz, Latin, popular, rap, reggae, r&b, rock, rockabilly, soul, and ska.

== Roster ==
- Johnny Cash
- Sammy Davis Jr.
- Funkadelic
- Mickey Gilley
- Rosco Gordon
- Charlie Gracie
- Carol Grimes
- Hardrock Gunter
- Gong
- Bill Haley & His Comets
- Ronnie Hawkins
- John Lee Hooker
- Ice-T
- Elmore James
- Jerry Lee Lewis
- Billy Lee Riley
- Curtis Mayfield
- Thelonious Monk
- Moon Mullican
- Johnny Pacheco
- Soft Heap
- Small Faces
- Alvin "Shine" Robinson
- Warren Smith
- The Staple Singers
- Gene Summers
- Sylvia Striplin
- Showaddywaddy
- Toots & the Maytals
- Sonny Boy Williamson and the Yardbirds
- 13th Floor Elevators
- The Red Crayola
- Bob Marley & The Wailers
- Carl Perkins

== See also ==
- List of record labels
