= Origins of rock and roll =

The origins of rock and roll are complex. Rock and roll emerged as a defined musical style in the United States in the early to mid-1950s. It was derived most directly from the rhythm and blues music of the 1940s, which itself developed from earlier blues, the beat-heavy jump blues, boogie woogie, up-tempo jazz, and swing music. It was also influenced by gospel, country and western, and traditional folk music. Rock and roll in turn provided the main basis for the music that, since the mid-1960s, has been generally known simply as rock music.

The phrase "rocking and rolling" originally described the movement of a ship on the ocean, but it was used by the early 20th century, both to describe a spiritual fervor and as a sexual analogy. Various gospel, blues and swing recordings used the phrase before it became used more frequently – but still intermittently – in the late 1930s and 1940s, principally on recordings and in reviews of what became known as "rhythm and blues" music aimed at black audiences. In 1939 during the April 5th broadcast on “The Fred Allen- Town Hall Tonight- Show” the song “Rock and Roll” appeared as a barber shop quartet lead-in.

In 1951, Cleveland-based disc jockey Alan Freed began playing this music style while popularizing the term "rock and roll" on mainstream radio. As a 2018 BBC article explained, "by the time DJ Alan Freed started using the term to describe ... rhythm and blues ... the sexual component had been dialled down enough that it simply became an acceptable term for dancing".

Freed was the first radio disc jockey and concert producer who frequently played and promoted rock and roll, including songs by black artists that were considered to be R&B. Various recordings that date back to the 1940s have been named as the first rock and roll record, or at least as precursors of the music.

== The term "rock and roll" ==
=== Early usage of the phrase ===
The alliterative phrase "rocking and rolling" originally was used by mariners at least as early as the 17th century to describe the combined "rocking" (fore and aft) and "rolling" (side to side) motion of a ship on the ocean. Examples include an 1821 reference, "... prevent her from rocking and rolling ...", and an 1835 reference to a ship "... rocking and rolling on both beam-ends".

The hymn "Rocked in the Cradle of the Deep", with words written in the 1830s by Emma Willard and tune by Joseph Philip Knight, was recorded several times around the start of the 20th century by the Original Bison City Quartet before 1894, the Standard Quartette in 1895, John W. Myers at about the same time, and Gus Reed in 1908. By that time, the specific phrase "rocking and rolling" was also used by African Americans in spirituals with a religious connotation.

On April 25, 1881, comedian John W. Morton of Morton's Minstrels performed a song entitled "Rock and Roll" as part of a repertoire of comic songs at a concert at the Theatre Royal in Victoria, British Columbia. A comic song titled "Rock and Roll Me" was performed by Johnny Gardner of the Moore's Troubadours theatrical group during a performance in Australia in 1886, and one newspaper critic wrote that Gardner "made himself so amusing that the large audience fairly rocked and rolled with laughter."

The earliest known recordings of the phrase were in several versions of "The Camp Meeting Jubilee", by both the Edison Male Quartet and the Columbia Quartette, recorded between 1896 and 1900. It contained the lyrics "Keep on rockin' an' rolling in your arms/ Rockin' an' rolling in your arms/ Rockin' an' rolling in your arms/ In the arms of Moses." "Rocking" was also used to describe the spiritual rapture felt by worshippers at certain religious events, and to refer to the rhythm often found in the accompanying music.

At around the same time, the terminology was used in secular contexts, for example to describe the motion of railroad trains. It has been suggested that it also was used by men building railroads, who would sing to keep the pace, swinging their hammers down to drill a hole into the rock, and the men who held the steel spikes would "rock" the spike back and forth to clear rock or "roll", twisting it to improve the "bite" of the drill. "Rocking" and "rolling" were also used, both separately and together, in a sexual context; writers for hundreds of years had used the phrases "They had a roll in the hay" or "I rolled her in the clover".

=== 20th century uses ===
By the early 20th century the words increasingly were used together in secular black slang with a double meaning, ostensibly referring to dancing and partying, but often with the subtextual meaning of sex.

In 1922, blues singer Trixie Smith recorded "My Man Rocks Me (with One Steady Roll)," first featuring the two words in a secular context. Although it was played with a backbeat and was one of the first "around the clock" lyrics, this slow minor-key blues was by no means "rock and roll" in the later sense.

However, the terms "rocking", and "rocking and rolling", were increasingly used through the 1920s and into the late 1940s, especially but not exclusively by black secular blues and jump blues musicians, to refer to either dancing or sex, or both. The term maintained a strong sexual connotation in the blues and R&B genre into the 1950s.

In 1927, blues singer Blind Blake used the couplet "Now we gonna do the old country rock / First thing we do, swing your partners" in "West Coast Blues", which in turn formed the basis of "Old Country Rock" by William Moore the following year. Also in 1927, traditional country musician Uncle Dave Macon, with his group the Fruit Jar Drinkers, recorded "Sail Away Ladies" with a refrain of "Don't she rock, daddy-o", and "Rock About My Saro Jane". Duke Ellington recorded "Rockin' in Rhythm" in 1928, and Robinson's Knights of Rest recorded "Rocking and Rolling" in 1930.

In 1932, the phrase "rock and roll" was heard in the Hal Roach film Asleep in the Feet. In 1934, the Boswell Sisters had a pop hit with "Rock and Roll" from the film Transatlantic Merry-Go-Round, where the term was used to describe the motion of a ship at sea. In 1935, Henry "Red" Allen recorded "Get Rhythm in Your Feet and Music in Your Soul" which included the lyric "If Satan starts to hound you, commence to rock and roll / Get rhythm in your feet..." The lyrics were written by the prolific composer J. Russel Robinson with Bill Livingston. Allen's recording was a "race" record on the Vocalion label, but the tune was quickly covered by white musicians, notably Benny Goodman with singer Helen Ward.

Other notable recordings using the words, both released in 1938, were "Rock It for Me" by Chick Webb, a swing number with Ella Fitzgerald on vocals featuring the lyrics "... Won't you satisfy my soul, With the rock and roll?"; and "Rock Me" by Sister Rosetta Tharpe, a gospel song originally written by Thomas Dorsey as "Hide Me in Thy Bosom". Tharpe performed the song in the style of a city blues, with secular lyrics, ecstatic vocals and electric guitar. She changed Dorsey's "singing" to "swinging," and the way she rolled the "R" in "rock me" led to the phrase being taken as a double entendre, with the interpretation as religious or sexual.

The following year, Western swing musician Buddy Jones recorded "Rockin' Rollin' Mama", which drew on the term's original meaning – "Waves on the ocean, waves in the sea/ But that gal of mine rolls just right for me/ Rockin' rollin' mama, I love the way you rock and roll". In August 1939, Irene Castle devised a new dance called "The Castle Rock and Roll", described as "an easy swing step", which she performed at the Dancing Masters of America convention at the Hotel Astor. The Marx Brothers' 1941 film The Big Store featured actress Virginia O'Brien singing a song starting out as a traditional lullaby which soon changes into a rocking boogie-woogie with lines like "Rock, rock, rock it, baby ...". Although the song was only a short comedy number, it contains references which, by then, would have been understood by a wide general audience.

When Alan Freed began referring to rock and roll on mainstream radio in 1951 however, "the sexual component had been dialled down enough that it simply became an acceptable term for dancing".

=== "Rock and roll" as a music style ===
According to the Oxford English Dictionary, an early use of the word "rock" in describing a style of music was in a review in Metronome magazine on July 21, 1938, which stated that "Harry James' "Lullaby in Rhythm" really rocks." In 1939, a review of "Ciribiribin" and "Yodelin' Jive" by the Andrews Sisters with Bing Crosby, in the journal The Musician, stated that the songs "... rock and roll with unleashed enthusiasm tempered to strict four-four time".

By the early 1940s, the term "rock and roll" was being used in record reviews by Billboard journalist and columnist Maurie Orodenker. In the May 30, 1942 issue, for instance, he described Sister Rosetta Tharpe's vocals on a re-recording of "Rock Me" with Lucky Millinder's band as "rock-and-roll spiritual singing", and on October 3, 1942, he described Count Basie's "It's Sand, Man!" as "an instrumental screamer.. [which].. displays its rock and roll capacities when tackling the righteous rhythms." In the April 25, 1945 edition, Orodenker described Erskine Hawkins' version of "Caldonia" as "right rhythmic rock and roll music", a phrase precisely repeated in his 1946 review of "Sugar Lump" by Joe Liggins.

A double meaning came to popular awareness in 1947 in blues artist Roy Brown's song "Good Rocking Tonight", one of the contenders for the first rock'n'roll record. It was covered in 1948 by Wynonie Harris in a wilder version, in which "rocking" was ostensibly about dancing but was in fact a thinly veiled allusion to sex. Such double-entendres were well established in blues music but were new to the radio airwaves. After the success of "Good Rocking Tonight", many other R&B artists used similar titles through the late 1940s. At least two different songs with the title "Rock and Roll" were recorded in the late 1940s: by Paul Bascomb in 1947 and Wild Bill Moore in 1948. In May 1948, Savoy Records advertised "Robbie-Dobey Boogie" by Brownie McGhee with the tagline "It jumps, it's made, it rocks, it rolls." Another record where the phrase was repeated throughout the song was "Rock and Roll Blues", recorded in 1949 by Erline "Rock and Roll" Harris. These songs were generally classed as "race music" or, from the late 1940s, "rhythm and blues", and were barely known by mainstream white audiences.

However, in 1951, Cleveland disc jockey Alan Freed began broadcasting rhythm, blues, and country music for a multi-racial audience. As one source points out, there was some controversy in his selection of recordings: "Freed would play the original singles by the black artists instead of waiting for a white singer to cover them".

Freed, familiar with the music of earlier decades, used the phrase 'rock and roll' to describe the music he aired over station WJW (850 AM); its use is also credited to Freed's sponsor, record store owner Leo Mintz, who encouraged Freed to play the music on the radio.

Several sources suggest that Freed discovered the term (a euphemism for sexual intercourse) on the record "Sixty Minute Man" by Billy Ward and his Dominoes. The lyrics include the line, "I rock 'em, roll 'em all night long". Freed did not acknowledge the suggestion about that source (or the original meaning of the expression) in interviews, and explained the term as follows: "Rock ’n roll is really swing with a modern name. It began on the levees and plantations, took in folk songs, and features blues and rhythm".

In discussing Alan Freed's contribution to the genre, two significant sources emphasized the importance of R&B in its development. After Freed was honored with a star on the Hollywood Walk of Fame in 1991, the organization's website offered this comment: "He became internationally known for promoting African-American rhythm and blues music on the radio in the United States and Europe under the name of rock and roll". Some years later, Greg Harris, then the Executive Director of the Rock and Roll Hall of Fame, said to CNN: "Freed's role in breaking down racial barriers in U.S. pop culture in the 1950s, by leading white and black kids to listen to the same music, put the radio personality 'at the vanguard' and made him 'a really important figure'".

== Development of the musical style ==
Rock and roll music emerged from the wide variety of musical genres that existed in the United States in the first half of the 20th century among different ethnic and social groups. Each genre developed over time through changing fashion and innovation, and each one exchanged ideas and stylistic elements with all the others. Contributions came from America's black population, with an ancient heritage of oral storytelling through music of African origin, usually with strong rhythmic elements, with frequent use of "blue notes" and often using a "call and response" vocal pattern. African music was modified through the experience of slavery, and through contact with white musical styles such as the folk ballad, and instruments, such as the Spanish guitar. New styles of music emerged among black Americans in the early 20th century in the form of blues, ragtime, jazz, and gospel music. According to the writer Robert Palmer:

"Rock 'n' roll was an inevitable outgrowth of the social and musical interactions between blacks and whites in the South and Southwest. Its roots are a complex tangle. Bedrock black church music influenced blues, rural blues influenced white folk song and the black popular music of the Northern ghettos, blues and black pop influenced jazz, and so on. But the single most important process was the influence of black music on white."

By the 1930s, African American musicians, such as Cab Calloway, Fletcher Henderson and Duke Ellington, were developing swing music, essentially jazz played for dancing, and in some areas such as New York City processes of social integration were taking place. According to Palmer, by the mid-1930s, elements of rock and roll could be found in every type of American folk and blues music. Some jazz bands, such as Count Basie's, increasingly played rhythmic music that was heavily based on blues riffs. In Chicago, blues performers formed into small groups, such as the Harlem Hamfats, and explored the use of amplification. In the Midwest, jump bands developed instrumental blues based on riffs, with saxophone solos and shouted vocals. In Nashville and elsewhere, country music played by white musicians such as Jimmie Rodgers incorporated blues styles, and in some cases was recorded with (uncredited) black musicians. In Texas and Oklahoma, Western swing bands, such as Bob Wills, Moon Mullican and Cliff Bruner combined elements of big band, blues and country music into a new style of dance music. As musicians from different areas and cultures heard each other's music, so styles merged and innovations spread. Increasingly, processes of active cross-fertilisation took place between the music played and heard by white people and the music predominantly played and heard by black people. These processes of exchange and mixing were fueled by the spread of radio, 78 rpm and later records and jukeboxes, and the expansion of the commercial popular music business. The music also benefited from the development of new amplification and electronic recording techniques from the 1930s onward, including the invention of the electric guitar, first recorded as a virtuoso instrument by Charlie Christian.

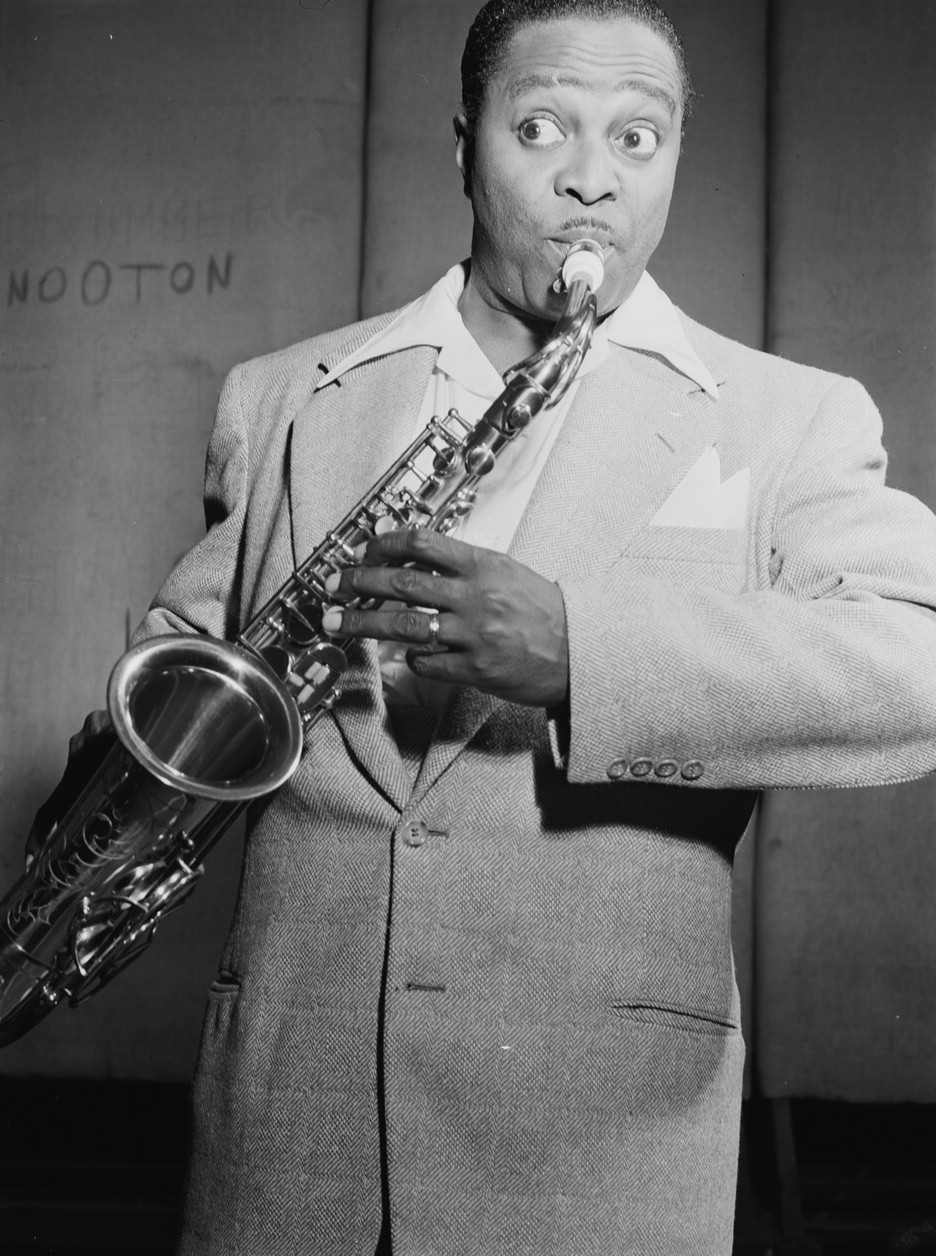
Louis Jordan in 1946

In 1938, promoter and record producer John H. Hammond staged the first "From Spirituals to Swing" concert in New York City to highlight black musical styles. It featured pianist Pete Johnson and singer Big Joe Turner, whose recording of "Roll 'Em Pete" helped spark a craze across American society for "boogie woogie" music, mostly played by black musicians. In both musical and social terms, this helped pave the way for rock and roll music. Economic changes also made the earlier big bands unwieldy; Louis Jordan left Chick Webb's orchestra the same year to form the Tympany Five. Mixing of genres continued through the shared experiences of the World War II, and afterward a new style of music emerged, featuring "honking" saxophone solos, increasing use of the electric guitar, and strongly accented boogie rhythms. This "jump blues" encompassed both novelty records, such as those by Jordan, and more heavily rhythmic recordings such as those by Lionel Hampton.

Increasingly, the term "rocking" was used in the records themselves, and by the late 1940s frequently was used to describe the music of performers such as Wynonie Harris whose records reached the top of the newly christened "rhythm and blues" charts.

In 1947, blues singer Roy Brown recorded "Good Rocking Tonight", a song that parodied church music by appropriating its references, including the word "rocking" and the gospel call "Have you heard the news?", relating them to very worldly lyrics about dancing, drinking and sex. The song became much more successful the following year when recorded by Wynonie Harris, whose version changed the steady blues rhythm to an uptempo gospel beat, and it was re-recorded by Elvis Presley in 1954 as his second single. A craze began in the rhythm and blues market for songs about "rocking", including "We're Gonna Rock" by Wild Bill Moore, the first commercially successful "honking" sax record, with the words "We're gonna rock, we're gonna roll" as a background chant. One of the most popular was "Rock the Joint", first recorded by Jimmy Preston in May 1949, and a R&B top 10 hit that year. Preston's version is often considered a prototype of a rock-and-roll song, and it was covered in 1952 by Bill Haley and the Saddlemen. Marshall Lytle, Haley's bass player, claimed that this was one of the songs that inspired Alan Freed to coin the phrase "rock and roll" to refer to the music he played.

Freed first started playing the music in 1951, and by 1953 the phrase "rock and roll" was becoming used much more widely to market the music beyond its initial black audience. The practitioners of the music were young black artists, appealing to the post-war community's need for excitement, dancing and increasing social freedoms, but the music also became very attractive to white teenagers. As well as "rocking" rhythm and blues songs, such as the massively successful and influential "Rocket 88" recorded by Ike Turner and his band but credited to singer Jackie Brenston, the term was used to encompass other forms of black music. In particular, vocal harmony group recordings in the style that later became known as "doo-wop", such as "Gee" by the Crows and "Earth Angel" by the Penguins, became huge commercial successes, often for the new small independent record companies becoming established. These included Modern, Imperial, Specialty, Atlantic, King and Chess.

According to some, including singer Tony Bennett, the father of the genre was Johnnie Ray, whose first record, "Cry", reached number 1 on the Billboard chart in 1951. One source states that Ray "opened the way for Elvis and the overt sexual energy of rock and roll ... [and] is credited by the Beatles, Bob Dylan, and Elton John as being a formative influence on their artistic styles". As well, Ray's manager said that Elvis Presley often watched Johnnie's concerts.

The adoption of rock and roll by white people was hindered by racist attitudes. As Billy Burnette said about his father Dorsey Burnette and uncle Johnny Burnette:

They'd buy their clothes on Beale Street, at Lansky Brothers, where all the black people shopped. Right outside Memphis, there was a voodoo village, all black-real mystic kind of people... A lot of real old line southern people called my dad and my uncle white nigger. Nobody was doing rock-and-roll in those days except people they called white trash. When my dad and my uncle started doin' it, they were just about the first.

Some of the rhythm and blues musicians who had been successful in earlier years – such as Joe Turner, Ruth Brown, and Fats Domino who had his first R&B hit in 1950 – made the transition into new markets.

Fats Domino was not convinced that his work belonged to a new genre. In 1957, he said: "What they call rock 'n' roll now is rhythm and blues. I’ve been playing it for 15 years in New Orleans". In an interview, Ike Turner offered a similar comment but about Rocket 88: "I don't think that ‘Rocket 88’ is rock ‘n’ roll. I think that ‘Rocket 88’ is R&B, but I think ‘Rocket 88’ is the cause of rock and roll existing".

According to Rolling Stone, "this is a valid statement ... all Fifties rockers, black and white, country born and city bred, were fundamentally influenced by R&B, the black popular music of the late Forties and early Fifties".

Much of the initial breakthrough of rock and roll into the wider pop music market came from white musicians, such as Haley, Presley, Carl Perkins and Jerry Lee Lewis, re-recording earlier rhythm and blues hits, often making use of technological improvements in recording and innovations such as double tracking, developed by the large mainstream record companies, as well as the invention of the 45-rpm record and the rapid growth of its use in jukeboxes. At the same time, younger black musicians such as Little Richard, Chuck Berry and Bo Diddley took advantage of the gradual breakdown of ethnic barriers in America to become equally popular and help launch the rock and roll era.

By the time of Haley's first hits in 1953, and those of Berry, Little Richard and then Presley the next year, the term and the concept of rock and roll was firmly established.

The Pentecostal church has also been identified as a crucial component in the development of rock and roll. The modern Pentecostal movement parallels rock and roll in many ways. Further, the unhinged, wild energy of the church is evidenced in the most important of early rock performers that were also raised in Pentecostal churches, including Sister Rosetta Tharpe, Elvis Presley, Little Richard, and Jerry Lee Lewis.

Another white singer, Johnnie Ray, who began to achieve success in the early 1950s, has also been called a major precursor to what became rock'n'roll, for his jazz and blues-influenced music, and his animated stage personality. Tony Bennett called Ray the "father of rock and roll." Some historians have noted him as a pioneering figure in the development of the genre. One source states that Ray "opened the way for Elvis and the overt sexual energy of rock and roll ... [and] is credited by the Beatles, Bob Dylan, and Elton John as being a formative influence on their artistic styles". As well, Ray's manager said that Elvis often watched Johnnie's concerts.

== Key recordings ==
=== 1920s ===
- "My Man Rocks Me (with One Steady Roll)" by Trixie Smith was issued in 1922, the first record to refer to "rocking" and "rolling" in a secular context.
- Papa Charlie Jackson recorded "Shake That Thing" in 1925.
- "That Black Snake Moan", a country blues first recorded in 1926 by Blind Lemon Jefferson, contains the lines "That's all right mama / That's all right for you / Mama, that's all right / Most any old way you do", later famously used by Arthur Crudup for his song "That's All Right", subsequently covered by Elvis Presley as his first single.
- "Honky Tonk Train Blues", by Meade "Lux" Lewis foreshadowed "Pine Top's Boogie Woogie" a year later, perhaps not coincidentally since Lewis and Pine Top had recently been roommates. Like Pine Top's later recording, it contained most of the elements that would be called Rock and Roll thirty years later, except with piano instead of guitar.
- "Way Down in Egypt Land” by the Biddleville Quintette, a gospel group from Biddleville, Charlotte, North Carolina who recorded for Paramount Records in 1926, has been described as "the earliest recording... featuring a consistent backbeat."
- "Sail Away Ladies" and "Rock About My Saro Jane" were recorded by Uncle Dave Macon and his Fruit Jar Drinkers on May 7, 1927. "Sail Away Ladies" is a traditional square dance tune, with, in Macon's version, a vocal refrain of "Don't she rock, daddy-o", which in other versions became "Don't you rock me, daddy-o". "Don't You Rock Me, Daddy-o" later became a hit in the UK in 1957 for both the Vipers Skiffle Group and Lonnie Donegan. Macon is thought to have learned the song "Rock About My Saro Jane" from black stevedores at Nashville in the 1880s, although Alan Lomax believed that the song dated from the mid-19th century.
- "Jim Jackson's Kansas City Blues" by Jim Jackson, recorded on October 10, 1927, was a best selling blues, suggested as one of the first million-seller records. Its melody line was later re-used and developed by Charlie Patton in "Going to Move to Alabama" (1929) and Hank Williams ("Move It on Over") (1947) before emerging in "Rock Around the Clock", (1954) and its lyrical content presaged Leiber and Stoller's "Kansas City". It contains the line "It takes a rocking chair to rock, a rubber ball to roll," which had previously been used in 1924 by Ma Rainey in "Jealous Hearted Blues", and which Bill Haley would later incorporate into his 1952 recording "Sundown Boogie."
- "It's Tight Like That" by Tampa Red with pianist Georgia Tom (Thomas A. Dorsey), recorded on October 24, 1928, was a highly successful early hokum record, which combined bawdy rural humor with sophisticated musical technique. With his Chicago Five, Tampa Red later went on to pioneer the Chicago small group "Bluebird" sound, and Dorsey became "the father of black gospel music".
- "Pine Top's Boogie Woogie" by Clarence "Pinetop" Smith, recorded on December 29, 1928, was one of the first hit "boogie woogie" recordings, and the first to include classic rock and roll references to "the girl with the red dress on" being told to "not move a peg" until she could "shake that thing" and "mess around". Smith's tune derives from Jimmy Blythe's 1925 recording "Jimmy's Blues", and earlier records had been made in a similar style by Meade "Lux" Lewis and others. A hit "pop" version of Smith's record was released by Tommy Dorsey in 1938 as "Boogie Woogie".
- "Crazy About My Baby" by Blind Roosevelt Graves and brother, Uaroy, recorded in 1929, was a rhythmic country blues with small group accompaniment. Researcher Gayle Dean Wardlow has stated that this "could be considered the first rock 'n' roll recording". The brothers also recorded rhythmic gospel music. The Graves brothers, with an additional piano player, later were recorded as the Mississippi Jook Band, whose 1936 recordings including "Skippy Whippy", "Barbecue Bust" and "Hittin' the Bottle Stomp" were highly rhythmic instrumental recordings which, according to writer Robert Palmer, "..featured fully formed rock and roll guitar riffs and a stomping rock and roll beat".

=== 1930s ===
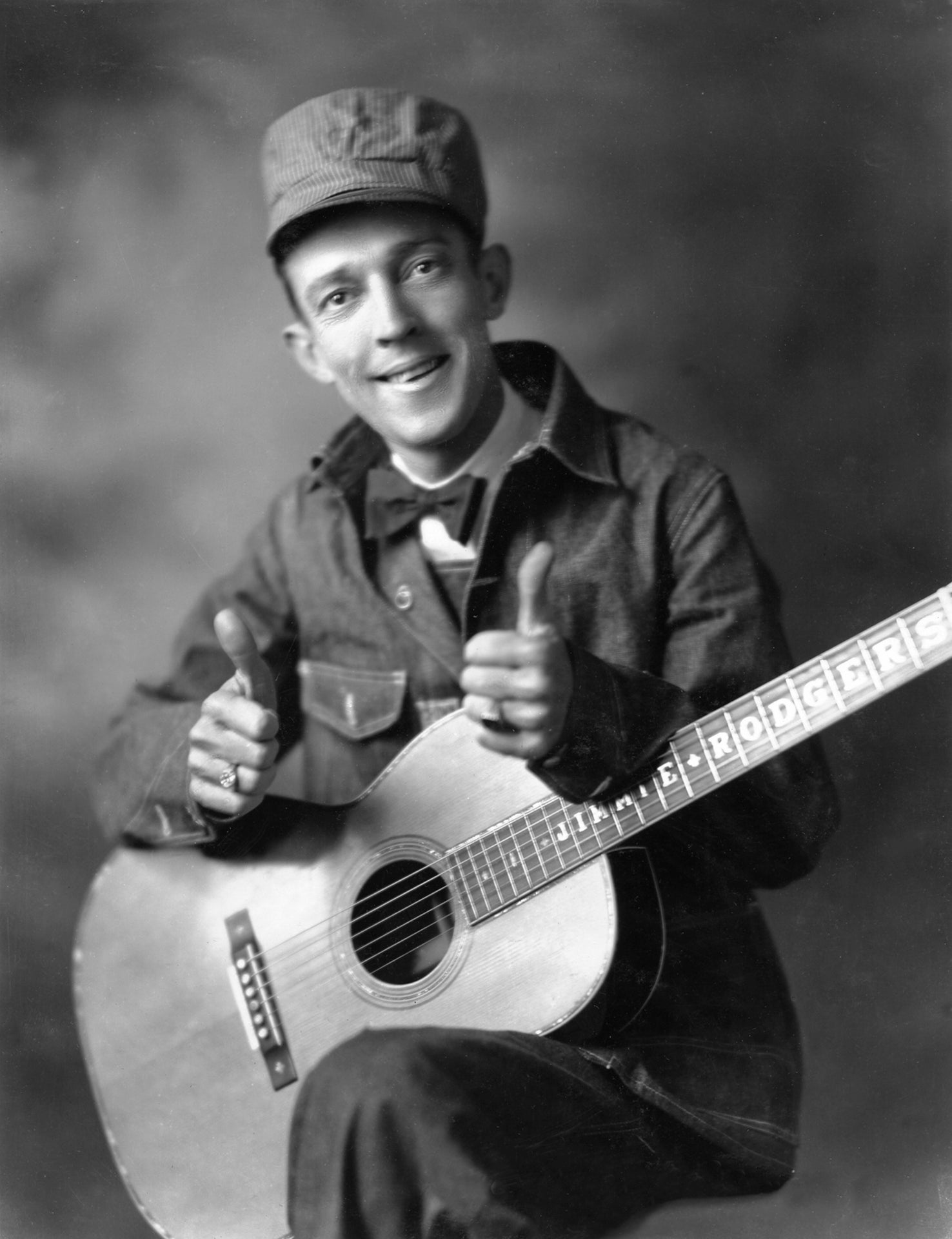
Jimmie Rodgers

- "Standing on the Corner (Blue Yodel No. 9)" by Jimmie Rodgers, recorded on July 16, 1930, was one of a series of recordings made by the biggest early star of country music in the late 1920s and early 1930s, based on blues songs he had heard on his travels. "Blue Yodel No. 9" was recorded with an uncredited Louis Armstrong (cornet) and Lil Armstrong (piano), foreshadowing later collaborations between black and white musicians but which at the time were almost unprecedented.
- "Tiger Rag" by the Washboard Rhythm Kings (later known as the Georgia Washboard Stompers), recorded in 1932, was a virtually out-of-control performance, with a rocking washboard and unusually high energy. It opens with a repeated one-note guitar lick that would transform into a chord in the hands of Robert Johnson, T-Bone Walker and others. This is just one of many recordings by spasm bands, jug bands, and skiffle groups that have the same wild, informal feel that early rock and roll had. After the original recording by the Original Dixieland Jass Band in 1917, "Tiger Rag" had become a jazz standard as well as widely covered in dance band and march orchestrations.
- "Good Lord (Run Old Jeremiah)" by Austin Coleman with Joe Washington Brown, from 1934, was a frenzied and raucous ring shout recorded by John and Alan Lomax in a church in Jennings, Louisiana, with the singer declaiming "I'm going to rock, you gonna rock ... I sit there and rock, I sit there and rock, yeah yeah yeah." Music historian Robert Palmer wrote that "the rhythmic singing, the hard-driving beat, the bluesy melody, and the improvised, stream-of-consciousness words... all anticipate key aspects of rock 'n roll as it would emerge some 20 years later."
- "Oh! Red" by the Harlem Hamfats, recorded on April 18, 1936, was a hit record made by a small group of jazz and blues musicians assembled by J. Mayo Williams for the specific purpose of making commercially successful dance records. Viewed at the time (and subsequently by jazz fans) as a novelty group, the format became very influential, and the group's recordings included many with sex and drugs references.
- "I Believe I'll Dust My Broom" (recorded on November 23, 1936), "Crossroad Blues" (recorded on November 27, 1936), and other recordings by Robert Johnson, while not particularly successful at the time, directly influenced the development of Chicago blues and, when reissued in the 1960s, also strongly influenced later rock musicians.
- "Rock It for Me" was recorded by Ella Fitzgerald with Chick Webb and His Orchestra in 1937. Its lyrics mentioned a kind of music called "rock and roll": "Every night/You'll see all the nifties/Plenty tight/Swingin' down the fifties/Now they're all through with symphony/Ho ho ho, rock it for me!/Now it's true that once upon a time/The opera was the thing/But today the rage is rhythm and rhyme/So won't you satisfy my soul/With the rock and roll?"
- "One O'Clock Jump" by Count Basie, arranged by Eddie Durham and recorded on July 7, 1937, was based on a 12-bar blues that builds in rhythmic intensity and features, like many of Basie's other records, the rhythm section of Jo Jones (drums), Walter Page (bass), and Freddie Green (rhythm guitar) that "all but invented the notion of swing through their innovations".
- "Sing, Sing, Sing" by Benny Goodman, also from 1937, written by Louis Prima, featured repeated drum breaks by Gene Krupa, whose musical nature and high showmanship presaged rock and roll drumming.
- "Rock Me" by Sister Rosetta Tharpe, recorded on October 31, 1938, was important not only for its lyrical content, but for its style. Many later rock and roll stars, including Elvis Presley, Jerry Lee Lewis, and Little Richard, cited Tharpe's singing, electric guitar playing, and energetic performance style as an influence. Tharpe performed the song with pianist Albert Ammons at the From Spirituals to Swing concert presented by John Hammond in Carnegie Hall on December 23, 1938. She also re-recorded the song with Lucky Millinder's band in 1942, and columnist Maurie Orodenker described her vocals as "rock-and-roll spiritual singing".
- "Ida Red" by Bob Wills and the Texas Playboys, recorded in 1938 by a Western swing band, featuring electric guitar by Eldon Shamblin. The tune was recycled again some years later by Chuck Berry in "Maybellene".
- "Roll 'Em Pete" by Pete Johnson and Joe Turner, recorded on December 30, 1938, was an up-tempo, non-swung boogie woogie with a hand-clapping backbeat and a collation of blues verses
- "Rocking the Blues" by the Port of Harlem Jazz Men, a group comprising Frank Newton, J.C. Higginbotham, Albert Ammons, Teddy Bunn, John Williams and Sidney Catlett, was an upbeat instrumental issued in 1939 as Blue Note no. 3.

=== 1940s ===
- "Early in the Morning" and "Jivin' the Blues", both recorded on May 17, 1940, by "Sonny Boy" Williamson, the first of the two musicians who used that name, are examples of the very influential and popular rhythmic small group Chicago blues recordings on Lester Melrose's Bluebird label, and among the first on which drums (by Fred Williams) were prominently recorded.
- "Down the Road a Piece" by the Will Bradley Orchestra, a smooth rocking boogie number, was recorded in August 1940 with drummer "Eight Beat Mack" Ray McKinley sharing the vocals with the song's writer Don Raye. The song would later become a rock and roll standard. The "eight beats" in McKinley's nickname and the popular phrase "eight to the bar" in many songs indicate the newness of the shift from the four beats per bar of jazz to boogie woogie's eight beats per bar, which became, and remains, characteristic of rock and roll. Bradley also recorded the first version of Raye's "Beat Me Daddy, Eight to the Bar", later recorded with greater commercial success by the Andrews Sisters, whose biggest hit "Boogie Woogie Bugle Boy" also contains numerous proto-rock and roll elements.
- "Flying Home" was recorded most famously in 1942 by Lionel Hampton and His Orchestra, with tenor sax solo by Illinois Jacquet, recreated and refined live by Arnett Cobb. This became a model for rock and roll solos ever since: emotional, honking, long, not just an instrumental break but the keystone of the song. The Benny Goodman Sextet had a popular hit in 1939 with a more subdued version of the song, featuring electric guitarist Charlie Christian. The book What Was the First Rock'n'Roll Record? by Jim Dawson and Steve Propes discusses 50 contenders as the "first rock and roll record", the earliest being "Blues, Part 2" from the 1944 Jazz at the Philharmonic live album, also featuring Jacquet's saxophone but with an even more "honking" solo.
- "Mean Old World" by T-Bone Walker, recorded in 1942, is an early classic by this hugely influential guitarist, often cited as the first song in which he fully found his sound. B.B. King credits Walker as inspiring him to take up the electric guitar, but his influence extended far beyond the blues to jazz and rock and roll. Among other innovations, "Mean Old World" has a two-string guitar lick where Walker bends notes on the G string up to the notes on the B string, which would be used by Chuck Berry in "Johnny B. Goode" and other songs.
- "Caldonia" was first recorded by Louis Jordan and then by Erskine Hawkins and others; the Hawkins version was called "right rhythmic rock-and-roll music" by Billboard. (The actual concept of rock and roll had not actually been defined at that time.) Several sources indicate that Little Richard was influenced by Louis Jordan. In fact, the artist said Caldonia was the first non-gospel song he learned; and the shriek on the Jordan record "sounds eerily like the vocal tone Little Richard would adopt" in addition to the "Jordan-style pencil-thin moustache".
- "Rock Me Mamma" by Arthur "Big Boy" Crudup, recorded on December 15, 1944, was the blues singer's first and biggest R&B chart hit, but in later decades became overshadowed by his – at the time, much less successful – 1946 recording of "That's All Right".
- "Strange Things Happening Every Day" by Sister Rosetta Tharpe, recorded in 1944 with pianist Sammy Price, was a boogie-woogie flavored gospel song that "crossed over" to become a hit on the "race records" chart, the first gospel recording to do so. It featured Tharpe on an Resonator guitar and is considered an important precursor to rock and roll.
- "The Honeydripper" by Joe Liggins, recorded on April 20, 1945, synthesized boogie-woogie piano, jazz, and the riff from the folk chestnut "Shortnin' Bread", into an exciting dance performance that topped the R&B "race" charts for 18 weeks (a record later shared with Jordan's "Choo Choo Ch'Boogie") and also made the pop charts. The lyrics proclaimed urban arrogance and were sexually suggestive – "He's a solid gold cat, the honeydripper... he's a killer, a Harlem diller...".
- "Guitar Boogie" by Arthur Smith, originally recorded in 1945 but not a hit until reissued in 1948, was the first boogie woogie played on the electric guitar, and was much imitated by later rock and roll guitarists. The tune was based on "Pinetop's Boogie Woogie" from 1929.
- "The House of Blue Lights" by Freddie Slack and Ella Mae Morse was recorded on February 12, 1946. The song was co-written by Slack with Don Raye, and, like Raye's "Down the Road a Piece", was recorded later by many rock and roll singers. Morse was one of the first white singers to perform what would now be regarded as rhythm and blues music. "The House of Blue Lights" was an important precursor to rock and roll.
- "Route 66", was recorded by the Nat Cole Trio on March 15, 1946. Written by Bobby Troup, the song was a big hit for Cole – who by that time already had 11 top ten hits on the R&B chart, starting with "That Ain't Right" in 1942 – and was later widely covered by rock and roll performers, including Chuck Berry.
- "Boogie Woogie Baby," "Freight Train Boogie" and "Hillbilly Boogie" by the Delmore Brothers, featuring harmonica player Wayne Raney, were typically up-tempo recordings, heavily influenced by the blues, by this highly influential country music duo, who had first recorded in 1931.
- "Open the Door, Richard" was a novelty R&B record based on a comedy routine performed by Dusty Fletcher, Pigmeat Markham and others. It was first recorded in September 1946 by Jack McVea, and immediately covered by many other artists, including Fletcher, Count Basie, The Three Flames, and Louis Jordan, all of whom had hits with it. It was the precursor of many similar novelty R&B-based records, which became a mainstay of early rock and roll in recordings by groups such as the Coasters.
- "That's All Right" by Arthur Crudup, released as a B side in 1946 and featuring Ransom Knowling on string bass and Judge Riley on drums, may be considered a transition song between blues and rock and roll and, arguably, the first rock and roll song according to several sources, including Southeastern Louisiana University rock historian Joseph Burns, who adds that "this song could contain the first ever guitar solo break". One reliable source states that it "stands as a convincing front-runner for rock ‘n’ roll's ground zero". The song was covered by Elvis Presley in 1954 as his first single but Presley's version was "at least twice as fast as the original".
- "Move It on Over" by Hank Williams was recorded on April 21, 1947. It was Williams' first hit on the country music charts, reaching no. 4. It used a similar melody to Jim Jackson's 1927 "Kansas City Blues" and was adapted several years later for "Rock Around the Clock".
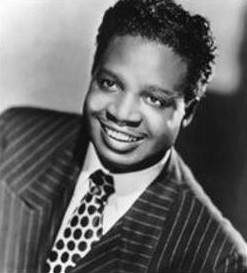
  Roy Brown, writer and singer of "Good Rocking Tonight" in 1947
- "Good Rocking Tonight", in separate versions by Roy Brown (1947) on the DeLuxe label and Wynonie Harris (1948), led to a craze for blues with "rocking" in the title. Roy Brown's original version was described on the record label as a "Rocking blues". One source states that the "opening line ... could double as a rallying call for rock ‘n’ roll".
- "Rock and Roll" by Wild Bill Moore was recorded in 1948 and released in 1949. This was a rocking boogie where Moore repeats throughout the song "We're going to rock and roll, we're going to roll and rock" and ends the song with the line "Look out mamma, going to do the rock and roll." Another version of this song (with songwriting credit to Moore) was recorded in 1949 by Doles Dickens. Also related were "Rock and Roll Blues" by Erline 'Rock and Roll' Harris, a female singer, with the lyrics "I'll turn out the lights, we'll rock and roll all night" and "Hole in the Wall" by Albennie Jones, co-written and produced by Milt Gabler, with the lyrics "We're gonna rock and roll at the hole in the wall tonight". However, the former vice-chairman of Modern Records, does not consider Moore's "Rock and Roll" to be the first in the genre.
- "It's Too Soon to Know", written by Deborah Chessler and performed by The Orioles, was number one on the American rhythm and blues charts in November 1948 and is considered by some to be the first "rock and roll" song.
- "Boogie Chillen'" (or "Boogie Chillun") is a blues song written by John Lee Hooker and recorded in 1948. It was Hooker's debut record release and became a No. 1 Billboard R&B chart hit in 1949. The guitar figure from "Boogie Chillen'" has been called "the riff that launched a million songs", inspiring many popular blues and rock songs. It is considered one of the blues recordings most influential on the forthcoming rock 'n' roll.
- "Rock Awhile" by Goree Carter was recorded in April 1949. It has been cited as a contender for the "first rock and roll record" title and a "much more appropriate candidate" than the more frequently cited "Rocket 88" (1951) according to the New York Times. Carter's over-driven electric guitar style was similar to that of Chuck Berry from 1955 onward. Critic Rober Palmer also cited " its lyrical instruction to “rock awhile,” and the way the guitar crackled through an overdriven amp".
- "Rock the Joint", recorded by Jimmy Preston in May 1949, was a prototype rock and roll song which was successful in its own right and highly influential in that it was recorded three years later in 1952 by Bill Haley in the same hard rocking style. Although Haley first recorded in 1946, his early recordings, including "Rovin' Eyes", were essentially in the Western swing style of country music as was his 1951 cover of "Rocket 88" (see below). "Rock the Joint" became the first of his records in the style that became known as rockabilly.
- "Saturday Night Fish Fry" by Louis Jordan and his Tympany Five, recorded in August 1949, was at the top of the R&B chart for 11 weeks and crossed-over to reach number 21 on the national pop chart. The song had a "lively jump rhythm, call-and response chorus and double-string electric guitar riffs that Chuck Berry would later admit to copying". Jordan is described by the Rock and Roll Hall of Fame as "The Father of Rhythm & Blues" and "The Grandfather of Rock 'n' Roll". The Hall also states that "Saturday Night Fish Fry" is "an early example of rap and possibly the first rock and roll recording". Chuck Berry was quoted as saying, "To my recollection, Louis Jordan was the first [person] that I heard play rock and roll."
- "The Fat Man" by Fats Domino was a "rollicking" song, according to The Guardian, "but what made it a rocker was Fats's barrelling piano triplets, combined with a solid big beat". Recorded in New Orleans on December 10, 1949, the song featured Domino on wah-wah mouth trumpet as well as piano and vocals. The insistent backbeat of the rhythm section dominates. "The Fat Man" "is cited by historians as the first rock and roll single and the first to sell more than 1 million copies". The tune is that of "Junker Blues", recorded by Champion Jack Dupree in 1940, which was itself derived from an unrecorded original by Willie "Drive 'Em Down" Hall.

=== Early 1950s ===
- "Boogie in the Park" by Joe Hill Louis, recorded in July 1950 and released in August 1950, featured Louis as a one-man band performing "one of the loudest, most overdriven, and distorted guitar stomps ever recorded" while playing on a rudimentary drum kit at the same time. It was the only record released on Sam Phillips' early Phillips label before founding Sun Records. Louis' electric guitar work is also considered a distant ancestor of heavy metal music.
- "Hot Rod Race" recorded by Arkie Shibley and His Mountain Dew Boys in late 1950, another early example of "rockabilly", highlighted the role of fast cars in teen culture.
- "Sixty Minute Man" by Billy Ward and the Dominoes, recorded on December 30, 1950, was the first (and most sexually explicit) big R&B hit to cross over to the pop charts, and features guitar playing by René Hall. The group featured the gospel-style lead vocals of Clyde McPhatter (though not on this song), and appeared at many of Alan Freed's early shows. McPhatter later became lead singer of the Drifters, and then a solo star.
- "Rocket 88" was recorded on March 5, 1951, by Jackie Brenston and His Delta Cats – actually Ike Turner's Kings of Rhythm, with Brenston doing the vocals. It was covered later in the year by Bill Haley and the Saddlemen. The original version – produced in Memphis by Sam Phillips and leased to Chess Records – was highly influential for its sound and lyrical content, and was a big hit. Many writers declare it as the first, or among the first, of the rock'n'roll genre. Turner considered it to be an R&B song. It reached no. 1 on the Billboard Rhythm and Blues chart on June 9, 1951, and set Phillips on the road to success by helping to finance his company Sun Records. Haley's version was one of the first white covers of an R&B hit. The song also features an early example of distortion, or fuzz guitar, played by the band's guitarist Willie Kizart. Ike Turner offered this comment: "I don't think that ‘Rocket 88’ is rock ‘n’ roll. I think that ‘Rocket 88’ is R&B, but I think ‘Rocket 88’ is the cause of rock and roll existing".
- "How Many More Years" recorded by Howlin' Wolf in May 1951. Robert Palmer has cited it as the first record to feature a distorted power chord, played by Willie Johnson on the electric guitar.
- "Cry" by Johnnie Ray was recorded on October 16, 1951. Ray's emotional delivery – he was mistaken for a woman, as well as for a black man – set a template for later vocal styles, and more importantly, showed that music could cross racial barriers both ways by topping the R&B chart as well as the pop chart.
- "Rock and Roll Blues" by Anita O'Day recorded on January 22, 1952. One of Anita O'Day's few compositions, she was one of the best jazz singers ever, and recorded this blues single on Mercury Records with her own orchestra.
- "Hound Dog" by Willie Mae "Big Mama" Thornton was recorded on August 13, 1952. A raucous R&B song recorded with Johnny Otis' band (uncredited for contractual reasons), it was written by white teenagers Jerry Leiber and Mike Stoller, covered three years later by Freddie Bell and the Bellboys (Teen Records 101), and then more famously by Elvis Presley. According to Maureen Mahon, a music professor at New York University, Thornton's version is "an important beginning of rock-and-roll, especially in its use of the guitar as the key instrument".
- "Love My Baby" and "Mystery Train" were recorded by Junior Parker with his electric blues band, the Blue Flames in 1953, "contributing a pair of future rockabilly standards" that later would be covered by Hayden Thompson and Elvis Presley, respectively. For Presley's version of "Mystery Train", Scotty Moore also borrowed the guitar riff from Parker's "Love My Baby", played by Pat Hare.
- "Gee" by the Crows was recorded on February 10, 1953. This was a big hit in 1954 in the Doo-wop genre, but crossed over to the pop charts, and is credited by rock n' roll authority Jay Warner, as being among "the first rock n' roll records".
- "Crazy Man, Crazy" by Bill Haley and his Comets, recorded in April 1953, was the first of his recordings to make the Billboard pop chart. This was not a cover, but an original composition, and has been described "the first rock and roll song to be a hit on the pop charts" although the term rockabilly might be more accurate. The Rock and Roll Hall of Fame considers the song "an original amalgam of country and R&B that arguably became the first rock and roll record to register on Billboard's pop chart".
- "Mess Around" by Ray Charles was recorded in May 1953, one of his earliest hits. The writing credit was claimed by Ahmet Ertegun, with some lyrics riffing off of the 1929 classic "Pinetop's Boogie Woogie". "I've Got a Woman", recorded in November 1954 and first performed when Charles was on tour with T-Bone Walker, was a bigger hit, widely considered to be the first soul song, combining gospel with R&B; its tune was derived from the gospel song "My Jesus is All the World to Me" by Alex Bradford.
- "The Things That I Used to Do" by Guitar Slim was recorded on October 16, 1953. It was an electric blues song that had a major impact on rock and roll and featured distorted overtones on the electric guitar a full decade before Jimi Hendrix. It is listed as one of The Rock and Roll Hall of Fame's 500 Songs that Shaped Rock and Roll.
- "Work with Me, Annie" by Hank Ballard and The Midnighters, was recorded on January 14, 1954. Despite, or because of, its salacious lyrics, it was immediately successful in the R&B market, topping the R&B chart for seven weeks, and led to several sequels, including Ballard's "Annie Had a Baby" and Etta James' first hit "The Wallflower", also known as "Roll with Me, Henry". Although the records were banned from radio play and led to calls for rock and roll to be banned, the lyrics were soon rewritten for a more conservative white audience, and Georgia Gibbs topped the pop charts in 1955 with her version "Dance with Me, Henry".
- "Shake, Rattle and Roll" by Big Joe Turner was recorded on February 15, 1954, and reached number one on the Billboard R&B chart in June and number 22 on the Billboard singles chart. It was covered early in July by Bill Haley and his Comets; this version, which substantially was different in lyric and arrangement, reached no. 7 in the pop chart at the end of August and predated his much wider success with "Rock Around the Clock" by almost a year. Elvis Presley's later 1956 version combined Haley's arrangement with Turner's lyrics, but was not a substantial hit.
- "Rock Around the Clock" by Bill Haley and His Comets (recorded on April 12, 1954) was the first no. 1 rock and roll record on the US pop charts. It stayed in the Top 100 for a then-record 38 weeks. The record is often credited with propelling rock into the mainstream, at least the teen mainstream. At first it had lackluster sales but, following the success of two other Haley recordings, "Shake Rattle and Roll" and "Dim, Dim the Lights", was later included in the movie Blackboard Jungle about a raucous high-school, which exposed it to a wider audience and took it to worldwide success in 1955. Eventually, the recording sold a total of 6 million copies. The song itself had first been recorded in late 1953 by Sonny Dae & His Knights, a novelty group whose recording had become a modest local hit at the time Haley recorded his version.
- James Cotton's "Cotton Crop Blues" and Pat Hare's "I'm Gonna Murder My Baby" (both recorded in May 1954), were electric blues records which feature heavily distorted, power chord-driven electric guitar solos by Pat Hare that anticipate elements of heavy metal music. The other side of Cotton's "Cotton Crop Blues" single "Hold Me in Your Arms" also featured a heavily distorted guitar sound by Hare that resembles the "distorted tones favored by modern rock players."
- "That's All Right, Mama" by Elvis Presley was recorded on July 5, 1954. This cover of Arthur Crudup's tune was Presley's first single. The Presley version was not identical to Crudup's since it was "at least twice as fast as the original". Its B-side was a rocking version of Bill Monroe's bluegrass song "Blue Moon of Kentucky", recognized by various rock singers as an influence on the music. Presley's version turned "it from a waltz to a bluesy rocker".

== Views on the first rock and roll record ==
The identity of the first rock and roll record is one of the most enduring subjects of debate among rock historians. Various recordings dating back to the 1940s and 1950s have been cited as the first rock and roll record. A number of sources have considered the first to be "Rocket 88", which was recorded in 1951 by Ike Turner's band, but credited to his saxophonist and the song's vocalist Jackie Brenston. Turner led the band but provided no vocals for "Rocket 88". The identity of the writer of the song remains in dispute. Brenston said that "they had simply borrowed from another jump blues about an automobile, Jimmy Liggins’ 'Cadillac Boogie'". Turner continued to maintain that he wrote the music and that he and the band jointly wrote the lyrics. In 1948 Pete Johnson had recorded a song called "Rocket Boogie "88"".

According to The Boston Globe's Joan Anderman, most rock historians cite "Rocket 88" as the first, while The New Rolling Stone Encyclopedia of Rock & Roll and the website of the Rock and Roll Hall of Fame said that it is "frequently cited" and "widely considered the first", respectively. People in the music industry have also called it the first, among several others. "Rocket 88" is cited for its forceful backbeat and unrefined, distorted electric guitar. By contrast, writer and musician Michael Campbell wrote that, "from our perspective," it was not the first rock and roll record because it had a shuffle beat rather than the rock rhythm originally characteristic in Chuck Berry's and Little Richard's songs, although he added that "Rocket 88" had basic characteristics of rock music such as the emphasis on guitar and distortion. Its characterization as a rock and roll or rhythm and blues song continues to be debated. Nigel Williamson questions whether it was really an R&B song "with an unusually fast, bottom-heavy eight-to-the bar boogie rhythm and a great lyric about cars, booze and women".

The music historian Robert Palmer wrote that Goree Carter's earlier 1949 song "Rock Awhile" is a "much more appropriate candidate" than "the more frequently cited" "Rocket 88". In Palmer's view, that is because of the presence of loud electric guitar work on the former song. Palmer wrote that "Rocket 88" is credited for its raucous saxophone, boogie-woogie beat, fuzzy amplified guitar, and lyrics that celebrate the automobile. However, he regards "Rock Awhile" to be a more appropriate candidate for the "first rock and roll record" title, because it was recorded two years earlier, and because of Carter's guitar work bearing a striking resemblance to Chuck Berry's later guitar work, while making use of an over-driven amplifier, along with the backing of boogie-based rhythms, and the appropriate title and lyrical subject matter. Roger Wood and John Nova Lomax also have cited "Rock Awhile" as the first rock & roll record. Others have taken the view that the first was Roy Brown's "Good Rocking Tonight", or Wynonie Harris' 1948 version; the song received greater exposure when Elvis Presley covered it in 1954. Sister Rosetta Tharpe's 1944 recording of "Strange Things Happening Every Day" has also been viewed as among the first.

The Rock and Roll Hall of Fame considers Chuck Berry to have been particularly significant in the origins of the genre. "While no individual can be said to have invented rock and roll ... Chuck Berry came the closest of any single figure to being the one who put all the essential pieces together".

Most rock historians have cited Bill Haley's 1953 song "Crazy Man, Crazy" as the first rock and roll record to reach the Billboard charts. Haley's "Rock Around the Clock" released in 1954 was the first rock and roll record to achieve significant commercial success and was joined in 1955 by a number of other records that pioneered the genre. Along with "Rock Around the Clock", several rock critics also have pointed to Presley's "That's All Right" from 1954 as a candidate for the first rock and roll record.

The 1992 book What Was the First Rock'n'Roll Record? by Jim Dawson and Steve Propes discusses 50 contenders, from Illinois Jacquet's "Blues, Part 2" (1944) to Elvis Presley's "Heartbreak Hotel" (1956), without reaching a definitive conclusion. In their introduction, the authors claim that since the modern definition of rock 'n' roll was set by disc jockey Alan Freed's use of the term in his groundbreaking The Rock and Roll Show on New York's WINS in late 1954, as well as at his Rock and Roll Jubilee Balls at St. Nicholas Arena in January 1955, they chose to judge their candidates according to the music Freed spotlighted: R&B combos, black vocal groups, honking saxophonists, blues belters, and several white artists playing in the authentic R&B style (Bill Haley, Elvis Presley). The artists who appeared at Freed's earliest shows included orchestra leader Buddy Johnson, the Clovers, Fats Domino, Big Joe Turner, the Moonglows, Clyde McPhatter and the Drifters, and the Harptones. That, say Dawson and Propes, was the first music being called rock and roll during that short time when the term caught on all over America. Because the honking tenor saxophone was the driving force at those shows and on many of the records Freed was playing, the authors began their list with a 1944 squealing and squawking live performance by Illinois Jacquet with Jazz at the Philharmonic in Los Angeles in mid-1944. That record, "Blues, Part 2," was released as Stinson 6024 and is still in print as a CD on the Verve label. Several notable jazz greats accompanied Jacquet on "Blues", including Les Paul and Nat King Cole, who used the pseudonyms Paul Leslie and Slim Nadine respectively.

In 2004, Elvis Presley's "That's All Right Mama" and Bill Haley's "Rock Around the Clock" both celebrated their 50th anniversaries. Rolling Stone felt that Presley's song was the first rock and roll recording. At the time, Presley recorded Big Joe Turner's "Shake, Rattle & Roll", later covered by Haley, which was already at the top of the Billboard R&B charts. The Guardian felt that while there were rock and roll records before Presley's, his recording was the moment when all the strands came together in "perfect embodiment". Presley said: "A lot of people seem to think I started this business, but rock and roll was here a long time before I came along."

Also formative in the sound of rock and roll were Little Richard and Chuck Berry. From the early 1950s, Little Richard combined gospel with New Orleans R&B, heavy backbeat, pounding piano and wailing vocals. Ray Charles referred to Little Richard as being the artist that started a new kind of music, which was a funky style of rock and roll that he was performing onstage for a few years before appearing on record in 1955 as "Tutti Frutti." Chuck Berry, with "Maybellene" (recorded on May 21, 1955, and which reached No. 1 on the R&B chart and no. 5 on the US pop chart), "Roll over Beethoven" (1956), "Rock and Roll Music" (1957) and "Johnny B. Goode" (1958), refined and developed the major elements that made rock and roll distinctive, focusing on teen life and introducing guitar intros and lead breaks that would be a major influence on subsequent rock music. Early rock and roll used the twelve-bar blues chord progression and shared with boogie woogie the four beats (usually broken down into eight eighth-notes/quavers) to a bar. Rock and roll, however, has a greater emphasis on the backbeat than boogie woogie. Bo Diddley's 1955 hit "Bo Diddley", with its B-side "I'm a Man", introduced a new beat and unique guitar style that inspired many artists without either side using the 12-bar pattern – they instead played variations on a single chord each. His more insistent, driving rhythms, hard-edged electric guitar sound, African rhythms, and signature clave beat (a simple, five-accent rhythm), have remained cornerstones of rock and pop.

Others point out that performers like Arthur Crudup and Fats Domino were recording blues songs as early as 1946 that are indistinguishable from later rock and roll, and that these blues songs were based on themes, chord changes, and rhythms dating back decades before that. Wynonie Harris' 1947 cover of Roy Brown's "Good Rocking Tonight" is also a claimant for the title of first rock and roll record, as the popularity of this record led to many answer songs, mostly by black artists, with the same rocking beat, during the late 1940s and early 1950s. Big Joe Turner's 1939 recording "Roll 'Em Pete" is close to 1950s rock and roll. Sister Rosetta Tharpe also was recording shouting, stomping music in the 1930s and 1940s, including "Strange Things Happening Every Day" (1944), which contained major elements of mid-1950s rock and roll. Pushing the date back even earlier, blues researcher Gayle Dean Wardlow has stated that "Crazy About My Baby" by Blind Roosevelt Graves and his brother, recorded in 1929, "could be considered the first rock 'n' roll recording".

By contrast, musician and writer Billy Vera argued that because rock and roll was "an evolutionary process", it would be foolish to name any single record as the first. Writer Nick Tosches similarly felt that, "It is impossible to discern the first modern rock record, just as it is impossible to discern where blue becomes indigo in the spectrum." Music writer Rob Bowman remarked that the long-debated question is useless and cannot be answered because "criteria vary depending upon who is making the selection."

Fats Domino was not convinced that he was singing rock and roll music. In 1956, he offered this comment on his work: "What they call rock and roll is rhythm and blues, and I've been playing it for 15 years in New Orleans."

Ike Turner offers another perspective, imagining Sam Philips' plan as follows: "'if I get me a white boy to sound like a black boy, then I got me a gold mine’, which is the truth". Ike's story continues: "So, that's when he got Elvis and he got Jerry Lee Lewis and a bunch of other guys and so they named it rock and roll rather than R&B... and so this is the reason I think rock and roll exists".
