= Baby Jay =

Baby Jay may refer to:

- A hatchling of any species of jay
- Baby Jay, bird mascot at the University of Kansas (counterpart to Big Jay)
- Baby Jay (View Askewniverse), the childhood depiction of the fictional character Jay from Jay and Silent Bob, portrayed by child actor Brian Andrew Saible
- The Chick, a historical oil painting that has been alternatively titled Baby Jay

== Music ==
- Baby Jay (rapper), American rapper, born Jonathan Gutierrez
- Baby Jay James, American cornetist from Mississippi who appeared on "Crazy About My Baby" and other Paramount Records recordings

== See also ==
- Baby J (American radio host), radio programmer based in Augusta, Georgia
- Baby J (Australian DJ), Perth-based DJ
- Baby Jey (Canadian band), a Canadian indie rock band
- John Mulaney: Baby J, a television special by John Mulaney
- Sweet Baby J'ai, American jazz singer
