= Wild Bill Moore =

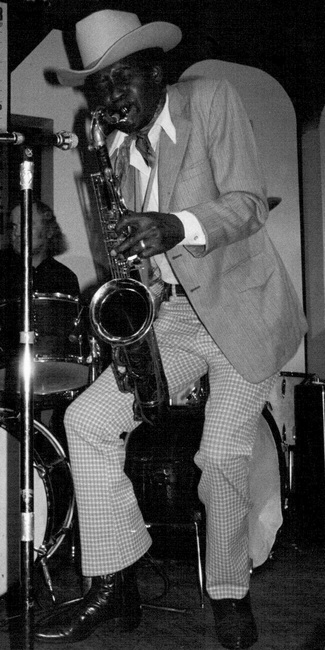

Background information
- Birth name: William M. Moore
- Born: June 13, 1918; Detroit, Michigan, United States
- Died: August 1, 1983 (aged 65); Los Angeles, California, United States
- Genres: R&B; jazz; blues
- Occupations: Saxophone player
- Years active: 1930s - 1980s

William M. "Wild Bill" Moore (June 13, 1918 – August 1, 1983) was an American R&B and jazz tenor saxophone player. Moore earned a modest hit on the Hot R&B charts with "We're Gonna Rock, We're Gonna Roll", which also was one of the earliest rock and roll records according to some sources.

Moore was born in Detroit Michigan and began playing the alto saxophone at an early age. However, prior to his musical career, he was an amateur boxer, winning Michigan's Golden Gloves light heavyweight championship in 1937, before briefly turning professional. By the early 1940s, Moore abandoned his boxing career in favor of music, and was inspired by musicians Chu Berry and Illinois Jacquet to switch to tenor saxophone. In 1944, he made his recording debut, accompanying Christine Chatman, the wife of Memphis Slim, for Decca Records. Between 1945 and 1947, Moore was performing and recording in Los Angeles with Slim Gaillard, Jack McVea, Big Joe Turner, Dexter Gordon, and played on Helen Humes’ hit recording, "Be-Baba-Leba".

In 1947 he moved back to Detroit and began recording with his own band, which included baritone player Paul Williams, later famous for "The Hucklebuck". In December of that year, he recorded "We're Gonna Rock, We're Gonna Roll" for the Savoy label which was a modest hit and is remembered today as one of many candidates for the first rock and roll record. It was one of the first records played by Alan Freed on his "Moondog" radio shows in 1951. However, by the standards of its time it was quite a primitive recording, notable mainly for the juxtaposition of the words “rock” and “roll”, and the battling saxophones of Moore and Williams. In 1949, he cut "Rock And Roll", reportedly featuring Scatman Crothers on vocals.

Moore continued recording and playing in clubs in and around Detroit. In this period he also recorded several jazz albums for the Jazzland label. In 1971, he was sought out by Marvin Gaye to play saxophone on the album What's Going On, notably the track "Mercy Mercy Me".

Eventually he returned to Los Angeles, California and lived there until his death, aged 65.

In their 1992 book, What Was the First Rock 'n' Roll Record?, Jim Dawson and Steve Propes dedicated a chapter to Moore and his influential "We're Gonna Rock, We're Gonna Roll."

Joe Bihari, the former vice-chairman of Modern Records, does not consider the song to be the first rock and roll record. "No. I don't think so. It was titled Rock and Roll, but that title probably just came out of my head."

== Discography ==
- Wild Bill's Beat (Jazzland, 1961)
- Bottom Groove (Jazzland, 1961)

With Houston Person

- The Real Thing (Eastbound, 1973)

With Big Joe Turner

- Things That I Used To Do (Pablo, 1977)
