= Rock It for Me =

"Rock It for Me" is a song written by twins Kay and Sue Werner, and released as a single in 1938 by Chick Webb and his orchestra, featuring singer Ella Fitzgerald. It reached Number. 19 on the US Billboard music chart.

The lyrics to "Rock It for Me" make an early, specific reference to the term "rock and roll", with "…won't you satisfy my soul with the rock and roll?" The song also mentions "a new kind of rhythm", suggesting "…I'm all through with symphony", and "…it's true that once upon a time the opera was the thing…but today the rage is rhythm and rhyme".

Although the term "rock and roll" was not widely used to describe a musical genre until the 1950s, uses of the term were not uncommon in various blues and jazz recordings from the 1920s onward. Billboard columnist Maurie Orodenker used the term as early as 1942, while Cleveland, Ohio disc jockey Alan Freed helped make the phrase popular in the early 1950s.

== See also ==
- Origins of rock and roll
