= James Nyx Jr. =

American songwriter (1914–1998)

James Nyx Jr. (May 3, 1914 – July 16, 1998), sometimes credited as James Nyx, was an American songwriter for the Motown label. He co-wrote "Inner City Blues (Make Me Wanna Holler)", which became a #9 hit for Marvin Gaye in 1971.

Nyx was born in Indianapolis, Indiana, but moved to Detroit in the 1930s, where he married twice and raised a family of eight children. He supported them through jobs requiring menial labor. At one time he was a resident of the Brewster-Douglass Housing Projects, where notable figures such as Diana Ross grew up.

His start in the music business was working as a janitor and handyman for Tri-Phi/Harvey Records, which was owned by the husband and wife team of Harvey Fuqua and Gwen Gordy Fuqua, sister of Berry Gordy.

He began to bring lyric ideas to Harvey, who collaborated with him on a few songs, including 1961's "Grieving About A Love," recorded by Lorri Rudolph. and 1963's "What Can You Do Now" recorded by Harvey and Ann (Bogan).

When Fuqua sold his labels to Motown Records in 1963, Nyx came along, signing to Jobete Music as a songwriter, but also working as a janitor and an elevator operator. He continued to write with Fuqua, and also Marvin Gaye, but most of his early songwriting work was shelved.

In July 1970, Gaye produced a song for The Originals, a Gaye/Nyx composition called "We Can Make It Baby."

Nyx's real breakthrough came a year later, when Gaye needed collaborators to help with lyrics for his next project, the sessions that became the landmark album What's Going On. Nyx co-wrote three tracks on the album, "What's Happening Brother," "God Is Love," and most famously, "Inner City Blues (Make Me Wanna Holler)."

Motown left Detroit the following year, but Nyx did not go with them. He stayed and continued writing songs for a Detroit company named KellGriff Music. One such effort, 1974's "Outta My Life/I'm One Who Know" by the Brewster Crew on Lifeline records (T. Rodgers/J. Nyx Jr.) was arranged by David Van De Pitte, who famously did the orchestrations for "What's Going On."

In the 1990s, samples of "Inner City Blues" were often used on R&B and rap records, providing Nyx with royalty income.
