= Biddleville =

Biddleville may refer to:

- Biddleville, California, former name of Bear Valley, Mariposa County, California
- Biddleville, Berkeley, California
- Biddleville (Charlotte neighborhood)
