= Gordon Staples =

- Born: Gordon James Staples, Jr. June 15, 1929; Los Angeles, California, United States
- Died: June 14, 1990 (Aged 60)
- Occupation: Violinist
- Known for: Concertmaster of the Detroit Symphony Orchestra
- Spouse: Beatriz Budinszky
- Children: Gregory Staples

Gordon Staples was an American violinist and past concertmaster for the Detroit Symphony Orchestra. He was known for his work as a leader and conductor of the string section on recording sessions for Motown Records during their heyday in the 1960s.

Born in Los Angeles, he made his way to Detroit, Michigan where he became a principal violinist for the Detroit Symphony Orchestra. In 1964, through his association with Motown arrangers such as David Van DePitte and Paul Riser, he brought in several members of the string section of the orchestra for a recording session involving singer Brenda Holloway and the song "Every Little Bit Hurts". Later that year, they were called in to lay down a string arrangement for a song written by Smokey Robinson and performed by The Temptations. The song, "My Girl," reached number one on the Billboard Pop and R&B charts and began a longtime collaboration with the label.

Laying a hand in crafting the "Motown Sound," they worked alongside the in-house band, the Funk Brothers, to create a Pop/R&B sound with an orchestral presence behind it which is heard on countless Motown recordings such as "It's Growing" (The Temptations), "Baby I Need Your Loving" (Four Tops), "Dancing in the Street" (Martha and the Vandellas), "I Hear a Symphony" (The Supremes) and "What's Going On" (Marvin Gaye). In 1965, eight of Motown’s top fifteen best-sellers featured orchestra contributions.

In 1970, He released a Motown album of his own in 1970 with members of the Funk Brothers, Strung Out, credited to Gordon Staples and the String Thing.

Staple's collaboration with Motown came to an end when the company moved headquarters to Los Angeles in 1972. Although not having attained the same level of fame as the label's better-known singers, his work on hundreds of Motown hit records has therefore been heard by millions of people all around the world.

His son Gregory followed in his father's footsteps, becoming a violinist for the Detroit Symphony since 1999.
