= Erline =

Erline is a given name. Notable people with the name include:

- Erline Harris (1914–2004), American rhythm and blue singer
- Erline P. McGriff (1924–2004), American professor of nursing
- Erline Nolte (born 1989), German bobsledder
