= Mercy Mercy Me (The Ecology) =

Single by Marvin Gaye

from the album What's Going On
- B-side: "Sad Tomorrows"
- Released: June 10, 1971
- Recorded: March 1971
- Studio: Hitsville U.S.A. (Studio A), Detroit
- Genre: Soul
- Length: 3:14 (LP version); 2:39 (7-inch version)
- Label: Tamla
- Songwriter: Marvin Gaye
- Producer: Marvin Gaye

Marvin Gaye singles chronology
"What's Going On" (1971)	"Mercy Mercy Me (The Ecology)" (1971)	"Inner City Blues (Make Me Wanna Holler)" (1971)

"Mercy Mercy Me (The Ecology)" is the second single from American singer-songwriter Marvin Gaye's 1971 album, What's Going On. Following the breakthrough of the title track's success, the song, written solely by Gaye, became regarded as one of popular music's most poignant anthems of sorrow regarding the environment. Led by Gaye playing piano, strings conducted by Paul Riser and David Van De Pitte, multi-tracking vocals from Gaye and the Andantes, multiple background instruments provided by the Funk Brothers and a leading sax solo by Wild Bill Moore. The song rose to #4 in Billboard, #2 in Record World and #4 in Cash Box. It was also #1 on the R&B Singles charts August 14 through to August 27, 1971. The song also brought Gaye one of his rare appearances on the Adult Contemporary chart, where it peaked at number 34. In Canada, "Mercy Mercy Me" spent two weeks at number 9.

The distinctive percussive sound heard on the track was allegedly a wood block struck by a rubber mallet, drenched in studio reverb.

As the single became his second million-seller from What's Going On, the album started on the soul album charts in the top five and began charging up the pop rankings. "Mercy Mercy Me (The Ecology)" soon became one of Gaye's most famous songs in his extensive catalogue. In 2002 it was his third single recording to win a "Grammy Hall of Fame" Award. As on "Inner City Blues", Bob Babbitt, not James Jamerson, plays the bass line.

== Reception ==
Cash Box described the song as being "a similar chugging ballad effort" to "What's Going On," stating that "the easy going surface lies gently above an exciting rhythm track." Record World said that the song "couldn't be more perfect" and reflects how Gaye "developed a style uniquely his own."

== Music video ==
In 1991, a music video of the song was released by Motown Records, featuring appearances by celebrities such as Big Daddy Kane, Bobby Brown, Diana Ross, David Bowie and Wesley Snipes.

== B-side ==
The B-side, "Sad Tomorrows", was the early version of "Flying High". This song featured on the 40th-anniversary edition of the album. Lyrically, the songs are both the same except "Sad Tomorrows" is a quick two-minute snippet.

== Personnel ==
- Marvin Gaye – lead and background vocals, piano, Mellotron
- The Andantes – additional background (harmony) vocals
- Wild Bill Moore – tenor saxophone solo
- David Van De Pitte – string conduction
- The Funk Brothers – other instrumentation

== Certifications ==
Region	Certification	Certified units/sales
New Zealand (RMNZ)	Gold	15,000^{‡}
United Kingdom (BPI)	Silver	200,000^{‡}
^{‡} Sales+streaming figures based on certification alone.

== Notable cover versions ==
- In December 1990, British singer Robert Palmer combined the song in a medley with Gaye's 1976 hit "I Want You". Palmer's single reached number 16 on the Billboard Hot 100 and number 4 on the Adult Contemporary chart in early 1991. It also reached number 9 on the UK Singles Chart.
- In 2006, American rock band The Strokes covered the track as a B-side to their single "You Only Live Once", featuring Eddie Vedder (of Pearl Jam) sharing vocals with Casablancas, and Josh Homme (of Queens of the Stone Age, Kyuss, Them Crooked Vultures and Eagles of Death Metal) playing drums alongside Fabrizio Moretti.
