= Blind Roosevelt Graves =

American blues musician (1909–1962)

- Born: Le Moise Roosevelt Graves; December 9, 1909; Rose Hill or Summerland, Mississippi, U.S.
- Died: December 30, 1962 (aged 53) Gulfport, Mississippi, U.S.
- Genres: Blues
- Occupation: Musician
- Instruments: Vocal; Guitar
- Years active: 1920s–1930s

Le Moise Roosevelt Graves (December 9, 1909 – December 30, 1962), credited as Blind Roosevelt Graves, was an American blues guitarist and singer, who recorded both sacred and secular music in the 1920s and 1930s.

== Biography ==
Roosevelt Graves was born in either Rose Hill or Summerland, Mississippi. On all his recordings, he played with his brother Uaroy Graves (c. 1912–c. 1959), who was also nearly blind and played the tambourine. They were credited as "Blind Roosevelt Graves and Brother". Their first recordings were made in 1929 for Paramount Records. Theirs is the earliest version recorded of "Guitar Boogie", and they exemplified the best in gospel singing with "I'll Be Rested". Blues researcher Gayle Dean Wardlow has suggested that their 1929 recording "Crazy About My Baby" "could be considered the first rock 'n' roll recording."

In July 1936, they were located by the talent broker H. C. Speir, who arranged for them to record in Hattiesburg, Mississippi, according to some sources at the train station, although Speir later told Wardlow that the recordings took place in a temporary studio, in the Hotel Hattiesburg, at Mobile Street and Pine Street. For the session they were joined by the local piano player Cooney Vaughn, who performed weekly on radio station WCOC in Meridian prior to World War II. The trio were billed on record as the Mississippi Jook Band. In all, they recorded four tracks at Hattiesburg for the American Record Corporation – "Barbecue Bust", "Hittin' The Bottle Stomp", "Dangerous Woman" and "Skippy Whippy". According to the Rolling Stone Illustrated History of Rock and Roll, these "...featured fully formed rock & roll guitar riffs and a stomping rock & roll beat".

The Graves Brothers did not record again. After the war, Roosevelt Graves is thought to have moved to Gulfport, Mississippi. Following a heart attack, Graves died December 30, 1962, at age 54 in Gulfport Memorial Hospital and was interred without a headstone in the old Mississippi City Cemetery.

For a number of years, the subject of Uaroy's identity was disputed. In several books, magazine articles, and album liner notes that mentioned the Graves brothers, the names "Aaron" or "Leroy" were substituted for Uaroy, on the assumption that the otherwise unknown name Uaroy must have arisen due to the poor penmanship of a recording company employee whose handwritten notes were misinterpreted. This controversy was put to rest in 2004, when photographic copies of the Paramount files were posted to the internet, and it could clearly be seen that the person who wrote up the recording session notes had written in a careful, almost printed hand, "Uaroy Graves."

In October 2008, the recordings by the Graves brothers and the Mississippi Jook Band, and others who recorded in Hattiesburg, were commemorated by a marker on the Mississippi Blues Trail, established to preserve the state's musical heritage.
