= Johnny Trudell =

American jazz musician (1939–2021)

Johnny Trudell (May 11, 1939 – May 29, 2021) was an American jazz and studio musician and composer whose instruments included trumpet, flugelhorn, valve trombone, and piano. Trudell was active in the Detroit music scene and participated in numerous Motown recordings.

== Life and work ==
Trudell graduated from Cass Tech High School and began working professionally as a musician. He played on many classic Motown albums from the 1960s and early 1970s, working with artists and groups including Marvin Gaye, Martha Reeves, The Temptations, The Four Tops, and many others. Trudell developed and directed the Motown brass section and coordinated the arrangers for the label.

In 1979 Trudell released his first album, Dream Dance, an attempt at a disco-Jazz crossover. By the time the album released, the disco wave was over and the album was not a success. He released another album in 1993, But Beautiful.

Trudell also played with the Tribe and was involved in a big band album by Wendell Harrison, Live In Concert, 1992. He worked as a trumpeter in the local jazz scene and played at many functions with Marcus Belgrave. Trudell was one of six musicians who played at his Belgrave's funeral.

He also worked from the early 1970s with The New McKinney's Cotton Pickers, Olive Brown & Her Blues Chasers, Barbara Ware, and Ron Kischuk. Between 1970 and 2013 he was involved in twelve recording sessions in the field of jazz.

== Discography ==
- Olive Brown & Her Blues Chasers: The New Empress of the Blues (Jazz Odyssee, 1973), with Ted Buckner, Mike Montgomery, Bill Bolle, J. C. Heard
- Masters Of Music: The Masters of Music Presents Detroit Jam (Brassors, 2011), with Johnny Trudell, Ron Kischuk, Gary Schunk, Marion Hayfen, Gayelynn McKinney, Judie Cochill
