= Biddleville Quintette =

The Biddleville Quintette was a vocal group from the Biddleville neighborhood of Charlotte, North Carolina, United States, who recorded traditional black gospel for Paramount Records between 1926 and 1929.

Although little information is available about the ensemble, the group is thought to have been led by a laborer, Adam Brown, and comprised four male singers and one woman. Their 36 recordings, released by Paramount on 78 rpm records, have become prized by collectors for their "passionate intensity and soulful delivery", featuring "call and response sanctified singing and sermons peppered with emphatic shouts and hollers. The 1929 recordings include instances of shape-note singing and progressive congregational polyphony...".

The group's 1926 recording of "Way Down in Egypt Land" has been cited by researcher Steven Baur as an early forerunner of rock and roll, for its consistently sustained and forceful handclapped backbeat. A later recording of the song, in 1929, was among the first gospel recordings to feature percussion instruments, thought to be a tambourine and washboard.

The group's complete recordings have been released on two albums by Document Records.
