= Baby Jay (rapper) =

- Born: Jonathan Gutierrez
- Origin: Houston, Texas, U.S.
- Genres: Hip hop
- Occupation: Rapper
- Years active: 2000s–2010s

Jonathan Gutierrez, known professionally as Baby Jay, is an American rapper from Houston, Texas. He is known for performing hip hop music with a positive message aimed at youth audiences.

== Background ==
Baby Jay began writing music at a young age and started rapping around age eight. As a teenager, he performed at community events and festivals in the Houston area and appeared at youth conferences and school programs promoting anti-drug, anti-violence, and anti-bullying messages.

He collaborated with musicians on educational and historical music projects, including a recording related to Underground Railroad songs. He also toured schools in the United States, performing for student audiences and participating in youth outreach programs.

In 2011, he was featured in a music and social change program associated with performances and documentary projects.

By 2012, Baby Jay was attending San Jacinto College and served as a spokesman for a regional initiative encouraging students to complete college degrees.

== Discography ==
- Keepin’ It Real (2006)
- Luv & Respect (2012)
