= Erline Harris =

American singer (1914–2004)

- Also known as: Erline "Rock and Roll" Harris; Earline Harris in various spellings
- Born: Erlyn Eloise Johnson; April 5, 1914; Thornton, Arkansas, US
- Died: January 6, 2004 (aged 89) Las Vegas, Nevada, US
- Genres: Blues, R&B
- Occupation: Singer
- Years active: 1939–1953
- Labels: DeLuxe; Chess

Erline Harris (April 5, 1914 – January 6, 2004), born Erlyn Eloise Johnson, was an American rhythm and blues singer in the 1940s and early 1950s. Her 1949 song "Rock and Roll Blue" was one of the first jump blues songs to use the phrase "rock and roll" in its secular context.

== Life and career ==
Erlyn Johnson was born in Thornton, Arkansas, the eldest of five children and a second cousin of Louis Armstrong. By 1930 she had left home, lived in New York City, and at one point in the 1930s was engaged to singer Billy Eckstine. She made her first professional appearance as a singer in 1939 at the Club Plantation in St. Louis, Missouri, and later owned a restaurant and lived in Boston, Massachusetts. In 1942 she graduated from Louisiana State Normal College, Natchitoches, Louisiana, and by the late 1940s was married to New Orleans dancer Ike "Streamline" Harris. By 1948, both Erline and her husband appeared on variety bills in New Orleans and elsewhere, often with such musicians as Dave Bartholomew and Paul Gayten. Her name was spelled in various ways in publicity material, usually as Erline but occasionally as "Earline", "Arline" or "Elaine".

She won her first recording contract, with De Luxe Records, in February 1949, and recorded several singles for the record label. The first, "Rock and Roll Blues", was one of the first jump blues songs to use that phrase in its secular context, with the lyrics "I'll turn out the lights, we'll rock and roll all night" The song was already her signature tune; the label credited her as Erline "Rock and Roll" Harris, and she was also credited as the writer of the song. The song is thought to have been recorded at Cosimo Matassa's studio in New Orleans, and became a regional hit. Her next record, "Jump and Shout", was another strong contender as one of the first rock and roll records, featuring a strong walking bass line, and honking saxophone by Plas Johnson of the Johnson Brothers from New Orleans. Johnson later went on to become one of the country's leading session musicians. In all, Harris recorded 12 tracks for DeLuxe, but they do not appear to have had much commercial success.

In 1950, she performed with saxophonist Epp James' band in Chicago clubs. She recorded again in 1951 for Chess Records, on "Pushin' My Heart Around" with John Peek's Orchestra. She did not record after 1951, but continued to perform in clubs, particularly in and around Georgia where she lived at the time. In 1953, she remarried, gave up her music career, and moved to Los Angeles, California, where she brought up a family of four children. As Erlyn E. Durgan, she died in 2004, in Las Vegas, Nevada, at the age of 89.

Harris' life story was almost completely undocumented until her daughter, Dale Comminey, was put into contact with writer and researcher John Broven. Drawing on scrapbooks and other material, Broven and Comminey collated a history of Erline Harris' life and career, which was published in two issues of Juke Blues magazine in 2010.
