= The Chick =

Oil painting

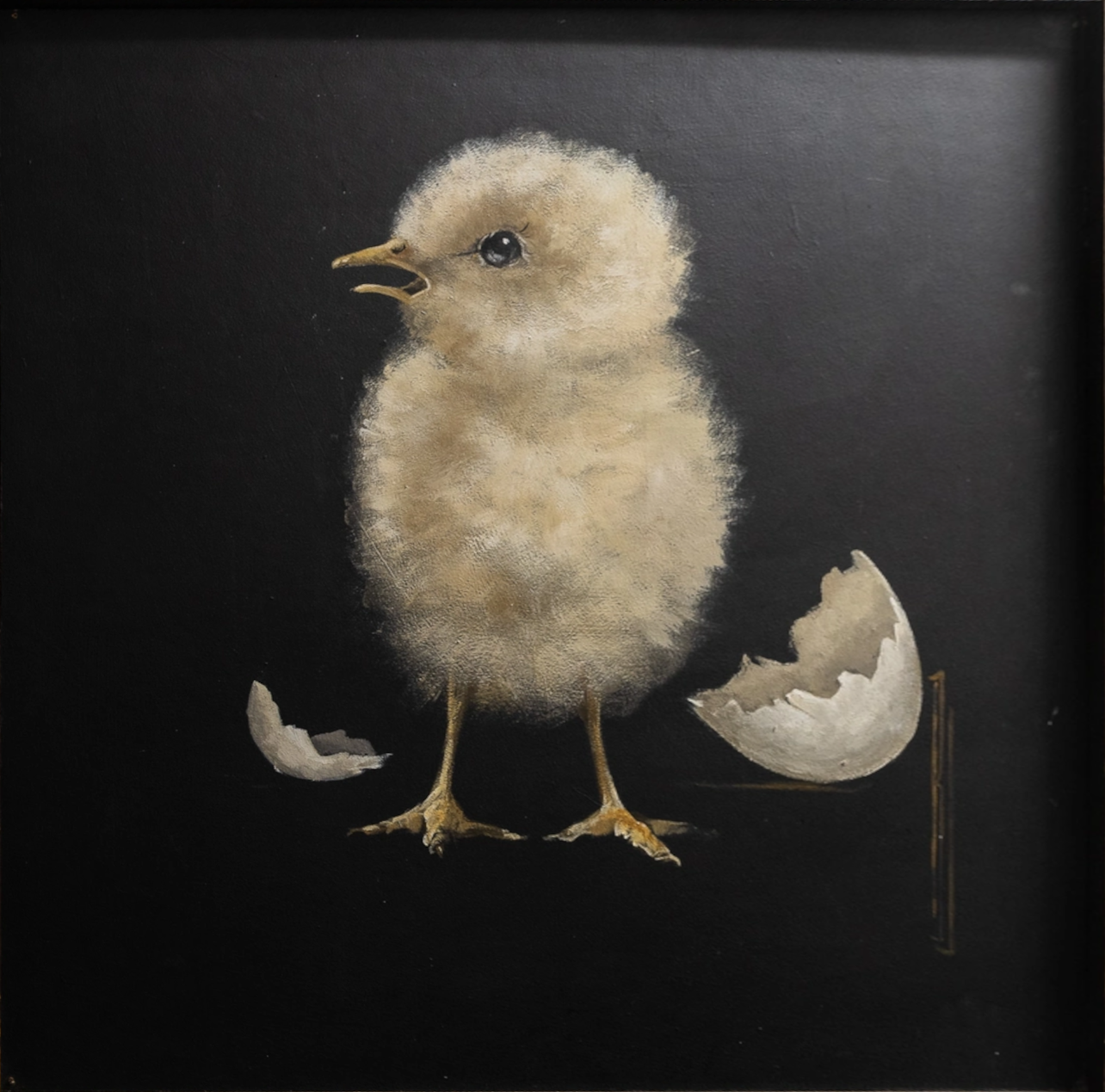
- The Chick
- Artist: Unknown
- Medium: Oil on canvas
- Dimensions: 61 cm × 61 cm (24 in × 24 in)
- Location: 38°53′12″N 77°0′31″W
- Owner: Emily Randall

The Chick is an oil painting traditionally given to the most junior member of the state of Washington's congressional delegation. The tradition started when representative Joel Pritchard, who had been given the painting by a friend in 1972, passed it on to newly-elected Norm Dicks in 1977. It is currently held by Representative Emily Randall of the 6th congressional district, who is the 33rd recipient of the painting.

== Description ==
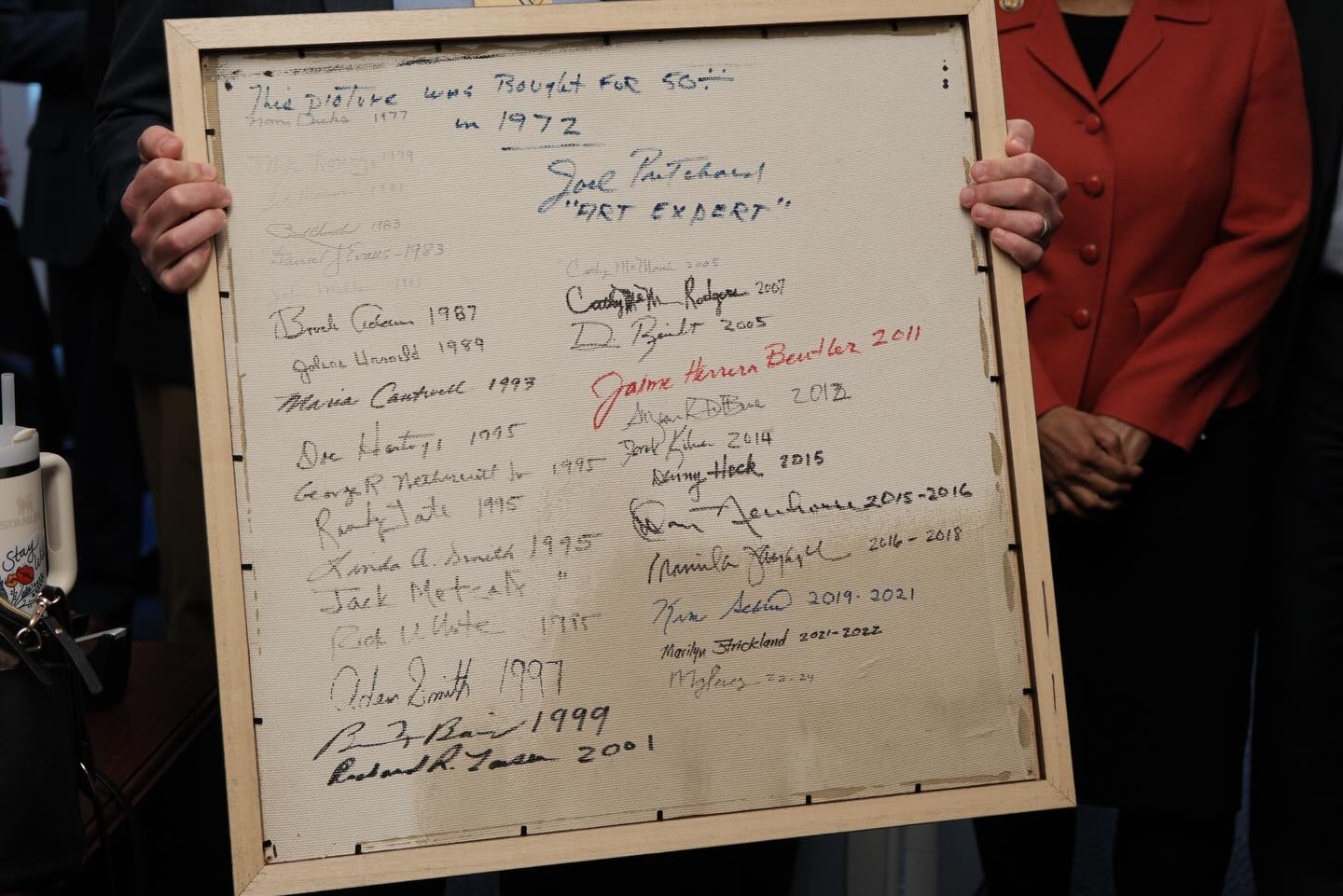
Photograph of the back of the painting in 2026, showing the signatures of the previous owners of the painting.

The Chick is painted with oil on canvas, protected by a wooden frame. It depicts a newly-hatched chicken and the remnants of its eggshell on a black background. The artist is unknown. The back of the painting is signed by members of the Washington delegation who have previously been in possession of the painting. The frame is labeled "Baby Jay", after Jay Inslee, who did not sign the painting when he was in Congress.

The painting is known for its lack of visual appeal; for instance, Representative Adam Smith referred to it as "a bit of an eyesore", and Representative Marie Gluesenkamp Perez described the painting as a "gimlet-eyed monstrosity".

== History ==
The painting was bought at a charity auction by a friend of Joel Pritchard who gave it to him in 1972, when he was elected as the representative for Washington's 1st congressional district. Pritchard was not fond of the picture and so presented it to Norm Dicks when he came to Congress as a fellow representative in 1977.

Since then, the painting has traditionally been given to the newest member of the Washington congressional delegation. If multiple new members of the delegation are elected in the same year, each receives the painting for a time. Every new member of Washington's delegation has displayed the painting, except for Jay Inslee, who served in the House from 1993 to 1995 and from 1999 to 2012.

The painting is currently held by Emily Randall, who represents Washington's 6th congressional district; she was sworn into office on January 3, 2025, together with Michael Baumgartner, and received the painting from him the next year, on January 9, 2026. She is the 33rd recipient of the painting.

== Significance ==
Traditionally, the painting is hung in its owner's office, with each member of Congress choosing precisely where it is displayed. Representative Emily Randall, who is the current owner of the painting, hung the painting in her office restroom as a protest against an effort in Congress to ban transgender people from using restrooms other than those of their sex assigned at birth. According to some members of the delegation, such as Michael Baumgartner, the painting and the process of gifting it symbolizes the cordial relationship between its bipartisan members. Others, such as representative Dan Newhouse, have interpreted the chicken in the painting as having an "eye of total confusion", and have related its expression to the process of becoming familiar with Congress.
