= Biddleville (Charlotte neighborhood) =

- Neighborhood
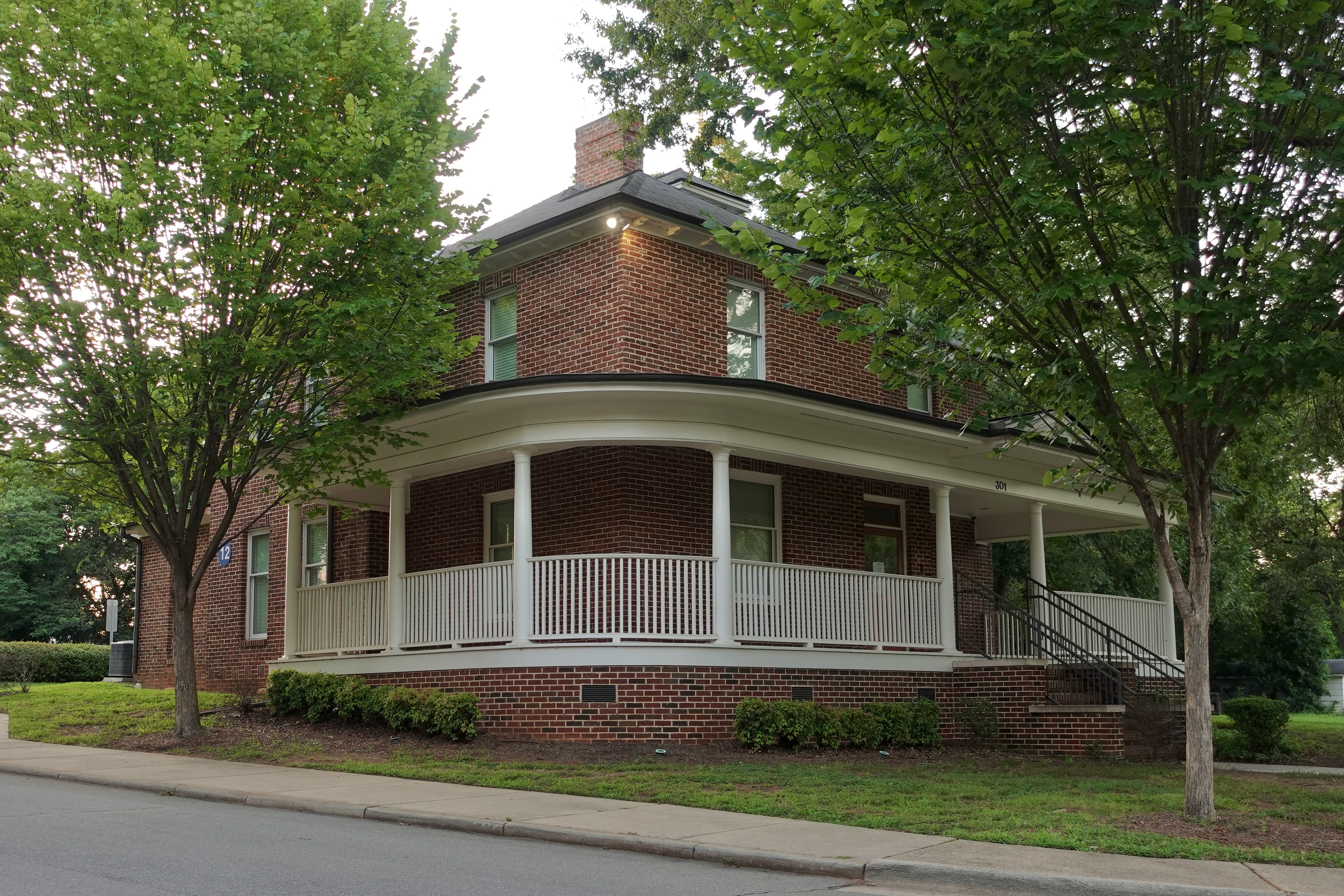
- The Dr. George E. Davis House in the Biddleville neighborhood of Charlotte, NC.
- Interactive map of Biddleville
- Coordinates: 35.241752°N 80.858757°W
- Country: United States
- State: North Carolina
- County: Mecklenburg County
- City: Charlotte
- Council District: 2
- Founded: 1871
- Annexed: 1907

Government
  - City Council: Malcolm Graham
- Time zone: UTC-5 (EST)
  - Summer (DST): UTC-4 (EDT)
- Zip Code: 28208, 28216
- Area codes: 704, 980

Biddleville is the oldest surviving predominantly African-American neighborhood in Charlotte, North Carolina. It is located one mile west of Uptown and Interstate 77 along Beatties Ford Road. Biddleville is home to Johnson C. Smith University, a historically black college.

== History ==
The Johnson C. Smith University was originally called the Henry J. Biddle Memorial Institute, that was formed shortly after the Civil War to educate aspiring black preachers and teachers. In 1876 it was renamed Biddle University. Biddleville arose as a supporting community of the Institute and was distinctly separate from Charlotte until it was annexed by the city in 1907.

In 1908, the Biddle University Quintet was formed to tour and raise funds in emulation of the Fisk Jubilee Singers. In 1920 they recorded four spiritual sides for Pathé Records. In 1938 they replaced the Golden Gate Jubilee Quartet as regular performers on the Charlotte WBT radio station. From 1926 to 1929 the Biddleville Quintette recorded extensively for Paramount Records. It is not known whether the two groups are the same, or even connected.

== Subdivisions ==
Biddleville has three subdivisions: Roslyn Heights, Smallwood, and Western Heights.
