= David Van De Pitte =

Music arranger

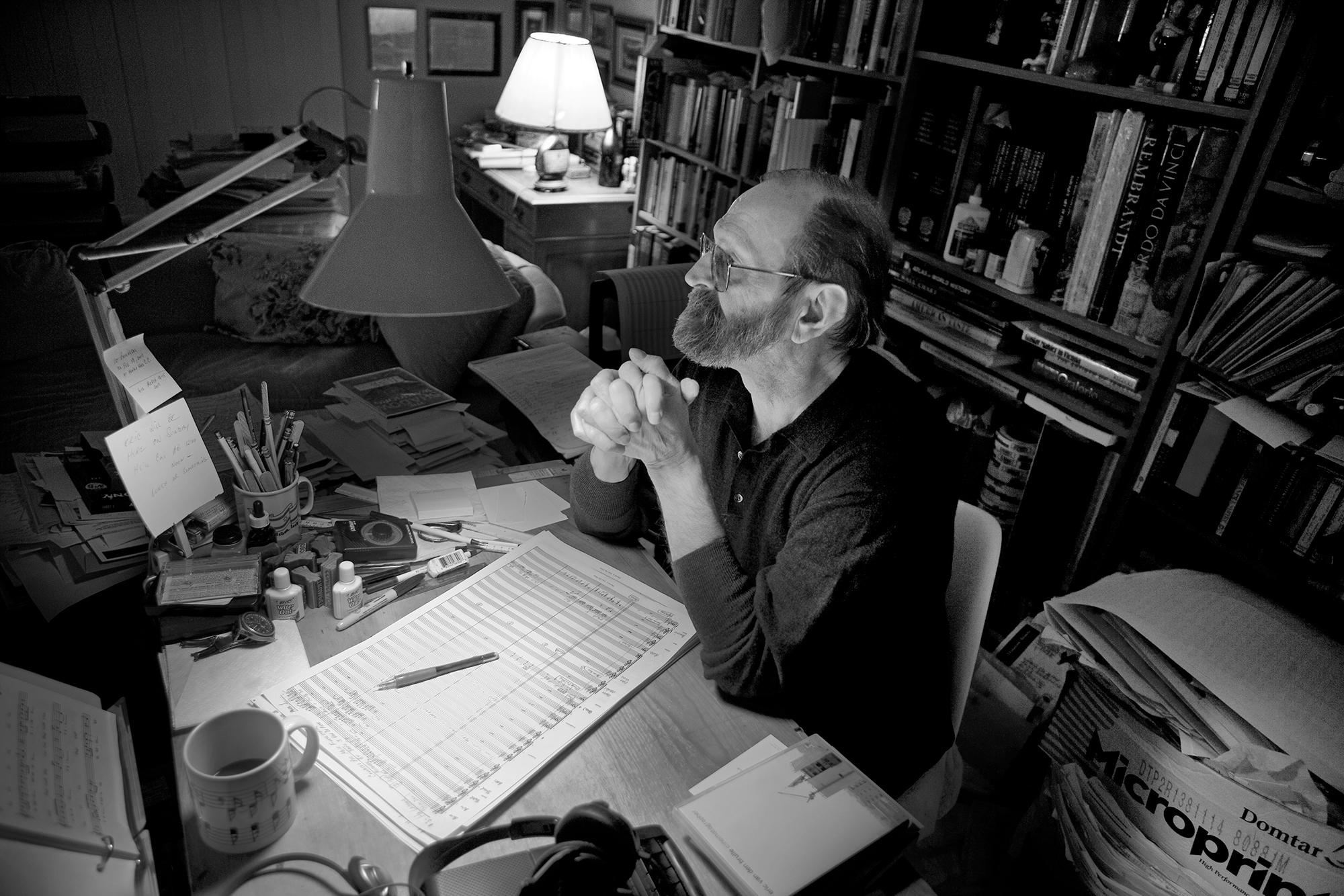
- David van de Pitte at his writing desk. Photo by Eric van den Brulle

Background information
- Born: October 28, 1941; Detroit, Michigan, U.S.
- Died: August 9, 2009 (aged 67) Southfield, Michigan, U.S.
- Occupations: Musician, music arranger
- Instrument: Bass
- Years active: 1960s–2009
- Formerly of: The Funk Brothers

David Joseph Van De Pitte (October 28, 1941 – August 9, 2009) was an American music arranger and bass player. He is best known for his work at Motown Records during the 1960s and early 1970s, when he was responsible for arranging many of the best known and most successful of the company's records, including those by Marvin Gaye, the Temptations, the Four Tops, the Jackson 5, Stevie Wonder, Gladys Knight and many others.

== Life and career ==
He was born in Detroit, Michigan, and studied music at the Westlake College of Music in Los Angeles, becoming proficient in classical, jazz and pop music. His main instrument was the bass, but he also played trombone and other instruments. In the early 1960s he began playing in Johnny Trudell's orchestra, and came to know many of the musicians who, then and later, worked at Motown, including bass player James Jamerson who sometimes substituted for him in Trudell's band.

He began working for Motown in 1968, and was responsible for arranging Marvin Gaye's albums What's Going On and Let's Get It On, as well as singles including "Nathan Jones" by The Supremes, "Still Water (Love)" by the Four Tops, "Ball of Confusion" and "Psychedelic Shack" by the Temptations, "If I Were Your Woman" by Gladys Knight, "Indiana Wants Me" by R. Dean Taylor, and "If You Really Love Me" by Stevie Wonder. He was nominated for a Grammy in 1971 for his work on What's Going On. As a music director, he was responsible for Marvin Gaye's TV performances and live appearances by the Temptations, Four Tops, and Diana Ross.

After leaving Motown in 1972, he worked freelance for artists including Paul Anka, Millie Jackson and George Clinton. He was an adjunct professor in the Jazz Studies program at Wayne State University from 1979 to 1983. He also wrote music for live shows and commercials on behalf of corporations including Ford, General Motors and Chrysler.

In 2008, he arranged four songs for the March 2008 Carl Dixon BandTraxs session at Studio A, Dearborn Heights, Detroit, where he and fellow musicians helped complete Dixon's dreams of paying homage to session musicians from the city who played on countless favourites of his from the 1960s. Playing on the session were the likes of Uriel Jones (drums), Dennis Coffey (guitar), Bob Babbitt (bass guitar), Ray Monette (guitar), Robert Jones (piano), Spider Webb (drums), George Katsakis (sax - The Royaltones), Gil Bridges (sax - Rare Earth), Dennis Sheridan (percussion), Larry Fratangelo, percussion (Kid Rock), John Trudell (trumpet), David Jennings (trumpet), Mark Berger (sax), George Benson (sax), Ed Gooch (trombone) and Rob Pipho (vibraphones). He scored the musical arrangements by hand and supplied charts to all musicians in the studio without the help of any computer.

He died of cancer in Southfield, Michigan, at the age of 67.

== Discography ==
=== As arranger ===
- What's Going On (1971)

With Stanley Turrentine

- The Man with the Sad Face (Fantasy, 1976)
