= Crazy About My Baby =

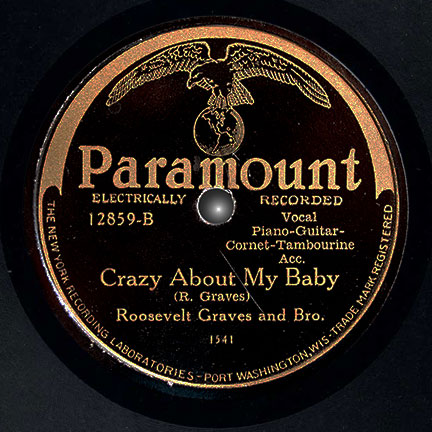

Single by Blind Roosevelt Graves
- B-side: "Bustin' The Jug"
- Released: 1929
- Recorded: 1929
- Genre: Boogie woogie
- Length: 3:10
- Label: Paramount
- Songwriter: Le Moise Roosevelt Graves

"Crazy About My Baby" is a boogie woogie song, first recorded by Blind Roosevelt Graves in 1929. It was perhaps the first recording to contain all stylistic elements of what would come to characterize rock and roll, and has been described as the first song of that genre.

== Historic song ==
Rock and roll evolved gradually out of boogie woogie, itself a fusion of blues, early ragtime-style jazz, religious and dance music such as honky tonk.

"Crazy About My Baby" contains all key elements of 1950s rock and roll, two decades earlier. It has accelerated blues guitar riffs and a danceable back beat, recognized as foreshadowing Chuck Berry compositions. The song is in the "blues in B flat" mode typical of 1950s rock, with Graves on guitar and vocals, session musician William Ezell on piano, Graves' brother playing tambourine, and Baby Jay James playing cornet. It has often been listed along with "Pinetop's Boogie Woogie" as "the first rock and roll recording".

In 1929, Le Moise "Blind Roosevelt" Graves and his brother Uaroy began recording boogie woogie music, a style that had acquired its name from the Pinetop Smith song a year earlier. Among their early songs are the first known recording of "Guitar Boogie", and "Crazy About My Baby". They were generally credited either as "Blind Roosevelt Graves and Brother" or the "Mississippi Jook Band".
