= Maurie Orodenker =

American journalist

Maurie Orodenker (né Maurice, or Morris, Harry Orodenker; 21 December 1908, Philadelphia – 8 October 1993, Philadelphia) was an American journalist, music critic and advertising agency executive. In the 1940s, when working as a record reviewer on Billboard magazine, he was one of the first to use the term "rock and roll" to describe upbeat blues and swing music of the type which soon afterwards became known as "rhythm and blues".

== Life and career ==
Born and raised in Philadelphia, he graduated from Franklin and Marshall College and received a master's degree in criminology from the University of Pennsylvania. Based in Philadelphia, he was working for Billboard by the late 1930s, a period when he was credited with being, with Joe Csida (né Joseph George Csida; 1912–1996), the first to seek to measure the popularity of songs on the basis of jukebox plays as an alternative to sheet music sales. In 1942, in one of his regular record review columns, he described Sister Rosetta Tharpe's vocals on Lucky Millinder's "Rock Me" as "rock-and-roll spiritual singing", one of the first recorded uses of the phrase to describe a style of music, and he continued to use the term regularly in reviews over the next few years, several years before its popularisation by Alan Freed and others. In 1945, for instance, he described Erskine Hawkins' version of "Caldonia" as "right rhythmic rock and roll music", a phrase precisely repeated in his 1946 review of "Sugar Lump" by Joe Liggins.

He established his own advertising agency in 1952, and also continued to contribute regularly to Billboard well into the 1980s. In later life he became noted as a collector of haggadot, books containing Passover stories read during the Seder meal, many of which he obtained from old bookstores and synagogues while traveling in Europe.

His surname derived from the Ukrainian city of Horodenka. He died at the age of 84 at Thomas Jefferson University Hospital in Philadelphia, survived by his wife Edith, daughter Harriet, and son Jerry.
