= Steve Propes =

American music writer

Stephen C. "Steve" Propes (b. about 1943) is a Long Beach, California record collector, disc jockey, and writer.

During the 1980s, Propes hosted an oldies/rhythm and blues radio show on KLON which had a large effect on the classic R&B revival of the time. He interviewed dozens of blues and R&B legends, such as Joe Turner, Lowell Fulson, Ruth Brown, Curtis Mayfield, Bo Diddley, Ike Turner, Hank Ballard, Bobby Day, Richard Berry, Don Julian, Brenton Wood, and Eugene Church, as well as doo-wop enthusiast George Carlin. He has since hosted a similar show on Simmons Cable television in Long Beach.

He is known for his collectors' books listing the monetary value of rock 'n' roll records. In 1989, Propes founded the Southern California Doo-Wop Society, with the help of some students from a rock 'n' roll history class he taught at Cal State Long Beach in the mid-'80s.

According to his entry at "L.A. Radio People", "Steve does consulting work in the history of rock & roll, record evaluation for the biggest company in the rare record business, Good Rockin' Tonight, and he is heard on RockitRadio.net."

Steve Propes writes for Beachcomber, a Long Beach-based magazine. In February 2015, he wrote a lengthy article detailing the history of Long Beach radio stations.

== Books ==
- Those Oldies But Goodies: A Guide to 50's Record Collecting, Macmillan, 1973
- Golden Oldies: A Guide to 60's Record Collecting, Chilton, 1974
- Golden Goodies: A Guide to 50's & 60's Popular Rock & Roll Record Collecting, Chilton, 1975
- What Was the First Rock 'n' Roll Record (with Jim Dawson; introductions by Dave Marsh and Billy Vera), Faber and Faber, 1992
- Merry Christmas Baby: Holiday Music From Bing to Sting (with Dave Marsh), Little, Brown & Company, 1993
- L.A. R&B Vocal Groups 1945-1965 (with Galen Gart), Big Nickel, 2000
- 45 RPM: The History, Heroes & Villains of a Pop Music Revolution (with Jim Dawson), Backbeat Books/Hal Leonard, 2003
- The Hobo Diaries: Nickerson Days - The Thousand Miler (with Clarence Bernard Propes), 2011
- OLD SCHOOL: 77 Years of Southern California R&B & Vocal Group Harmony Records 1934-2011, 2013

== Additional information ==
There is differing information on when Steve Propes worked at KLON. According to a Los Angeles Times article, it was from 1980 to 1989. According to Steve's information at Rock-it Radio, he was on KLON from 1981 to 1990, while his L. A. Radio People entry lists his KLON stay as 1981 to 1992.
