= Jim Dawson =

American writer

- Born: September 10, 1944 (age 81); United States
- Occupations: Author, writer
- Writing career
- Genres: Popular culture, rock and roll

Jim Dawson (born September 10, 1944) is an American author and self-proclaimed "fartologist", who has specialized in pop culture of early rock and roll and the history of flatulence, having written three books on the latter subject.

== Biography ==
Jim Dawson is a Hollywood-based writer who has specialized in American pop culture (especially early rock 'n' roll) and the history of flatulence (three books so far, including his 1999 top-seller, Who Cut the Cheese? A Cultural History of the Fart). Mojo magazine called his What Was the First Rock 'n' Roll Record (1992), co-written with Steve Propes, "one of the most impressive musical reads of the year"; it remains a valuable source for music critics and rock historians, and an updated second edition is currently available on Kindle. Dawson has also written a series of articles on early rhythm and blues and rock 'n' roll pioneers for the Los Angeles Times, including a front-page story in the Calendar entertainment section on the forgotten tragic figure Ritchie Valens. The piece led directly to Rhino Records reissuing Valens' entire catalog (with Dawson's liner notes) and eventually to the 1987 biopic La Bamba, which used some of Dawson's research. Since 1983 Dawson has also written liner notes for roughly 150 albums and CDs, including Rhino's prestigious Central Avenue Sounds box set celebrating the history of jazz and early R&B in Los Angeles. He's currently working on a novel about a 1920 coal mine war in his native West Virginia.

== Books ==
- 1999 'Who Cut the Cheese? A Cultural History of the Fart' (Ten Speed Press) ISBN 978-1-58008-011-8
- 2006 'Blame It on the Dog: A Modern History of the Fart' (Ten Speed Press) ISBN 978-1-58008-751-3
- 2010 'Did Somebody Step on a Duck? A Natural History of the Fart' (Ten Speed Press/Random House) ISBN 978-1-58008-133-7
- 1992 'What Was the First Rock 'n' Roll Record?' (with Steve Propes; introductions by Dave Marsh and Billy Vera), (Faber and Faber) ISBN 978-0-571-12939-3
- 1995 'The Twist: The Story of the Song and Dance That Changed the World' (Faber and Faber) ISBN 978-0-571-19852-8
- 1994 'Nervous Man Nervous: Big Jay McNeely and the Rise of the Honking Tenor Sax' (Big Nickel Publ.) ISBN 978-0-936433-17-2
- 1996 'Memories of Buddy Holly' (Big Nickel Publ.) ISBN 978-0-936433-20-2
- 2003 '45 RPM: The History, Heroes & Villains of a Pop Music Revolution' (Backbeat Books/Hal Leonard) ISBN 978-0-87930-757-8
- 2005 'Rock Around the Clock: The Record That Started the Rock Revolution' (Backbeat Books/Hal Leonard) ISBN 978-0-87930-829-2
- 2008 'Los Angeles's Angels Flight' (Arcadia Publishing) ISBN 978-0-7385-5812-7
- 2009 'The Compleat Motherfucker: A History of the Mother of All Dirty Words' (Feral House) ISBN 978-1-932595-41-3
- 2012 'Los Angeles's Bunker Hill: Pulp Fiction's Mean Streets and Film Noir's Ground Zero' (History Books) ISBN 978-1-609495-46-6
