= Billboard Top R&B Records of 1952 =

Billboard Top R&B Records of 1952 is made up of two year-end charts compiled by Billboard magazine ranking the year's top rhythm and blues records based on record sales and juke box plays.

Retail year-end	Juke box year-end	Title	Artist(s)	Label
1	4	"Lawdy Miss Clawdy"	Lloyd Price	Specialty
2	2	"Have Mercy Baby"	Billy Ward and his Dominoes	Federal
3	3	"5-10-15 Hours"	Ruth Brown	Atlantic
4	10	"Goin' Home"	Fats Domino	Federal
5	5	"Night Train"	Jimmy Forest	United
6	7	"My Song"	Johnny Ace	Duke
7	12	"One Mint Julep"	The Clovers	Atlantic
8	16	"Ting-A-Ling"	The Clovers	Atlantic
9	9	"3 O'Clock Blues"	B.B. King	RPM
10	1	"Juke"	Little Walter	Checker
11	13	"No More Doggin'"	Rosco Gordon	RPM
12	7	"You Know I Love You"	B.B. King	RPM
13	14	"Mary Jo"	The Four Blazes	Atlantic
14	18	"Booted"	Rosco Gordon	Chess & RPM
15	6	"Five Long Years"	Eddie Boyd	Job
16	28	"Heavenly Father"	Edna McGriff	Jubilee
17	NR	"Call Operator 210"	Floyd Dixon	Aladdin
18	NR	"Flamingo"	Earl Bostic	King
19	17	"Cry"	Johnnie Ray	Okeh
20	15	"Moody's Mood for Love"	King Pleasure	Prestige
21	NR	"Middle of the Night"	The Clovers	Atlantic
22	29	"Best Wishes"	Roy Milton	Specialty
23	NR	"I'll Drown in My Tears"	Sonny Thompson	King
24	NR	"Wheel of Fortune"	Sunny Gale	Derby
25	25	"Daddy, Daddy"	Ruth Brown	Atlantic
26	NR	"So Tired"	Roy Milton	Specialty
27	NR	"Easy, Easy, Baby"	Varetta Dillard	Savoy
28	22	"I'm Gonna Play the Honky Tonks"	Marie Adams	Peacock
29	NR	"That's What You're Doing to Me"	The Dominoes	Federal
30	30	"Fool, Fool, Fool"	The Clovers	Atlantic
NR	11	"Got You on My Mind"	Big John Greer	RCA Victor
NR	19	"Sweet Sixteen"	Big Joe Turner	Atlantic
NR	20	"So Tired"	Roy Milton	Specialty
NR	21	"Oooh, Oooh, Oooh"	Lloyd Price	Specialty
NR	22	"Rock Me All Night Long"	The Ravens	Mercury
NR	24	"Weepin' and Cryin'"	Griffin Brothers	Dot
NR	26	"Hey, Miss Fannie"	The Clovers	Atlantic
NR	27	"Port of Rico"	Illinois Jacquet	Mercury

== See also ==
- Billboard No. 1 R&B singles of 1952
- Billboard year-end top 30 singles of 1952
- 1952 in music
