= Eddie My Love =

- Single cover

Single by The Teen Queens

from the album Eddie My Love
- B-side: "Just Goofed"
- Released: January 1956
- Genre: Doo wop, soul
- Length: 2:53
- Label: RPM
- Songwriters: Maxwell Davis (BMI); Aaron Collins, Jr. (ASCAP); Sam Ling (BMI)

The Teen Queens singles chronology
"Eddie My Love" (1956)	"So All Alone" (1956)

"Eddie My Love" is a 1956 doo wop song by the Teen Queens. According to BMI and ASCAP, the song was written by Maxwell Davis (BMI), Aaron Collins, Jr. (ASCAP), and Sam Ling (BMI). Maxwell Davis played sax on the Teen Queens record. Aaron Collins was the brother of the Teen Queens. Sam Ling was an alias of Saul Bihari, co-founder of Modern, RPM, and other labels; Bihari and his brothers regularly attached their names to songwriting credits (without contributing substantially to writing the songs) as a means of getting a cut of the royalties, as was common practice at the time.

The Teen Queens were the first to record the song, releasing their rendition on RPM in 1956. It became their biggest selling single, with several follow up records failing to generate the same success. The Chordettes and the Fontane Sisters also released hit versions of "Eddie My Love" in 1956.

Jim Jacobs and Warren Casey, in their 1971 musical Grease, parodied "Eddie My Love" as "Freddy, My Love".

== Chart performance ==
The song reached No. 13 on the Cash Box Top 50 Best Selling Records chart, in a tandem ranking of the Teen Queens, the Chordettes, the Fontane Sisters, and Lillian Briggs's versions, with the Teen Queens, the Chordettes, and the Fontane Sisters' versions marked as bestsellers, while reaching No. 8 on Cash Box's chart of "The Ten Records Disk Jockeys Played Most This Week", and No. 12 on Cash Box's Top Ten Juke Box Tunes chart. The song also reached No. 10 on Billboard's Honor Roll of Hits, with the Teen Queens, the Chordettes, and the Fontane Sisters' versions listed as best sellers.

The Teen Queens version was ranked No. 17 in Cash Box's ranking of "1956's Top R&B Records as Voted in the Cash Box Poll".

=== The Teen Queens version ===
Chart (1956)	Peak position
US Billboard Best Sellers in Stores	14
US Billboard Most Played in Juke Boxes	16
US Billboard Top 100	22
US Billboard Rhythm and Blues Records - Best Sellers in Stores	3
US Billboard Rhythm and Blues Records - Most Played by Jockeys	2
US Billboard Rhythm and Blues Records - Most Played in Juke Boxes	4
US Cash Box Rhythm & Blues Top 15	2

=== The Chordettes version ===
Chart (1956)	Peak position
US Billboard Best Sellers in Stores	17
US Billboard Most Played by Jockeys	14
US Billboard Top 100	18

=== The Fontane Sisters version ===
Chart (1956)	Peak position
US Billboard Best Sellers in Stores	15
US Billboard Most Played by Jockeys	13
US Billboard Most Played in Juke Boxes	11
US Billboard Top 100	12
