= The Teen Queens =

American pop music group

The Teen Queens were an American musical group from the 1950s, most remembered for their hit single "Eddie My Love", which reached No. 14 on the Billboard Hot 100 chart and No. 3 on the R&B Best Sellers charts in March 1956.

== Biography ==
The group consisted of sisters Betty and Rosie Collins, sisters of Aaron Collins, who was a singer with the doo wop group The Cadets. Aaron Collins wrote their debut song, and the single that became their biggest hit. "Eddie My Love" was released by RPM Records, and, following its success, was followed by a string of other releases. These included "Baby Mine", "Billy Boy", "Red Top", "Rock Everybody" and "I Miss You", but none of these achieved the success of their debut song.

Consequently, the group left RPM in 1958 and signed a one record recording contract with RCA Records, who released "Dear Tommy". This also failed to make much of an impact on the charts. There then followed a later contract with Antler Records and a further two singles, "There's Nothing on My Mind" (an answer song to "There's Something on Your Mind") and "I Heard Violins". Again, however, these songs enjoyed little success and by 1961, the group decided to stop recording music.

"Eddie My Love" was also recorded by The Chordettes and The Fontane Sisters, both of which also made the chart in 1956, and was parodied as "Freddy My Love" in the musical Grease.

In 1968, Rosie took an overdose of pills and alcohol and did not wake up after going to sleep, and Betty died in 1971 due to drug problems.
