= Prentice Moreland =

American musician

- Born: March 4, 1925; East St. Louis, Illinois, US
- Died: September 1988 (aged 63)
- Occupation: Singer

Prentice Moreland (March 4, 1925 – September 1988) was an American R&B and doo wop singer of the 1950s and early 1960s.

== Early life ==
Moreland was born on March 4, 1925, in East St. Louis, Illinois. Moreland had 6 children Prentice Moreland, Jr., Cherita Moreland, Raynice Moreland, Denna Moreland, Arlene Moreland, and Brenda Williams Moreland. Moreland also had several grandchildren and a host of great-grandchildren residing in both California and Kansas City, Mo. At some point in his life, he claimed to be related to comedian Mantan Moreland; although he called Mantan his uncle and the two men got along well, Moreland's daughter says there was never any confirmation of an actual familial relationship.

== Career ==
Moreland was a member of many vocal groups including The Dominoes, The Du Droppers, The Chanteclairs, The Cadets, The Crescendos, The Fortunes, The Hollywood Flames, and possibly The Sevilles (the group that had a hit with "Charlena" in 1961). Moreland replaced Ted Taylor (who had left for a solo career) on The Cadets' "Stranded In The Jungle" session and was the one who came up with the "Great Googa Mooga! Lemme outta here!" line in the song. Aaron Collins of The Cadets said of Moreland's line "I think he picked that up from Rochester (Anderson). Prentice knew Rochester pretty well." At the same session, he recorded a solo version of "Memories Of You," a song that had been done by The Ink Spots in 1939; it was released on RPM Records in 1957. He recorded along with Jackie Wilson, Milton Merle, and Cliff Givens in The Dominoes in 1955, later returning to the group a few more times. With the Crescendos, he recorded "Finders Keepers" and "Sweet Dreams" for Atlantic Records in 1956, alongside Bobby Relf of The Laurels, Young Jessie of The Flairs, and Bobby Byrd of The Hollywood Flames. He was asked by Buck Ram to join The Platters but Moreland refused because he had to take care of one of his daughters (Arlene Eunice Moreland)

Around the same time that Moreland recorded with The Chanteclairs on Dot Records in 1954 (as "Prentice Moore"), there was a Dot recording called "You Gave Me Heartaches" by Prentice Miller. It is possible that "Prentice Miller" is actually Prentice Moreland. Moreland's name is listed as "Prince Moreland" for the recordings he did for Johnny Otis' Dig Records in 1956. One of the songs, "My Mother's Eyes" was previously sung in the 1929 film Lucky Boy by George Jessel. Moreland also sang two Ivory Joe Hunter songs, "I Almost Lost My Mind" and "I Need You So." In the '60s, Moreland was a member of several imposter and spin-off Ink Spots groups, including those fronted by Cliff Givens, George Holmes, and Orville Brooks. He was never a member of the original Ink Spots that recorded for Decca.

According to singers Young Jessie and Bobby Nunn, The Coasters' big hit "Searchin'" from 1957 had originally been put together by Moreland, Bobby Day, Earl Nelson, and Young Jessie at Bobby Day's house about three years before it was recorded. Jerry Leiber and Mike Stoller heard their song and wrote more lyrics to the song, adding references to movie detectives.

Moreland worked in the clubs in Las Vegas, Nevada, and other local night clubs in Los Angeles until he died in September 1988, a year after Ted Taylor (whom Moreland had replaced in The Cadets) had died in a car crash.

== Discography ==
=== Solo singles and recordings ===
- "Memories of You" (Modern) (unreleased) (September 1956) (backup by The Cadets) (contains original chorus, different from the RPM #487 release in 1957)
- "Believe Me Beloved"/"I’ve Never Been There" (RPM #475) (October 1956) (as Prentice Mooreland)
- "I Almost Lost My Mind" (Dig) (unreleased) (1956) (as Prince Moreland)
- "I Need You So" (Dig) (unreleased) (1956) (as Prince Moreland)
- "My Mother’s Eyes" (Dig) (unreleased) (1956)
- "Marie My Love"/"Memories of You" (RPM #487) (February 1957) ("Memories Of You" is overdubbed over original chorus)
- "Please, Please, Please"/"Oh Pretty Baby" (Edsel #778) (1959)
- "Chinese Junk"/"Looking For Your Heart" (Donna #1320) (1959)
- "Wagon Wheels" (Del-Fi) (1960) (unreleased)
- "Holy Mack'rel"/"Teacher Drives Me Crazy (Challenge #9134) (10 February 1962)
- "Chubby Ain’t Chubby No More"/"You Are My Sunshine" (Challenge #9154) (1962)
- "Lover Supreme"/"For Your Love" (Challenge #9176) (1962)
- "Limbo Party"/"Come On Pretty Baby" (Challenge #9181) (1963)

=== Group singles and recordings ===
- "I've Never Been There" (Groove) (18 March 1954; unreleased) (The Du Droppers)
- "You've Been Good To Everybody" (Groove) (18 March 1954; unreleased) (The Du Droppers)
- "Just Whisper"/"How Much Longer" (Groove #0013) (April 1954) (The Du Droppers) (sings lead on "How Much Longer")
- "Baby Please"/"Someday Love Will Come My Way" (Dot #1227) (1954) (The Chanteclairs) (may have been recorded without Moreland)
- "Believe Me, Beloved"/"I’ve Never Been There" (Dot #15404) (1955) (The Chanteclairs)
- "Can't Do Sixty No More"/"If I Never Get To Heaven" (Federal #12209) (February 1955) (The Dominoes) (Moreland sings lead on "If I Never Get To Heaven")
- "Give Me You"/"Over The Rainbow" (King #1502) (August 1955) (The Dominoes) (Moreland appears on "Give Me You")
- "Bobby Sox Baby"/"How Long, How Long Blues" (Federal #12263) (April 1956) (The Dominoes) (Moreland appears on "Bobby Sox Baby")
- "Stranded In The Jungle"/"I Want You" (Modern #994) (1956) (The Cadets) (Moreland appears on "Stranded In The Jungle")
- "Finders Keepers"/"Sweet Dreams" (Atlantic #1109) (September 1956) (The Crescendos) (Moreland sang first tenor)
- "Tarnished Angel"/"Who Cares" (Decca #30541) (1958) (The Fortunes)
- "How Clever Of You"/"Trees" (Decca #30688) (1958) (The Fortunes)
- "Alone In A Crowd" (Liberty) (unreleased) (about 1958) (The Dominoes) (Moreland sang lead)
- "I’m Always Chasing Rainbows" (Liberty) (about 1958; unreleased) (The Dominoes) (Moreland sang lead)
- "I’ll Be Seeing You"/"Sweet Dreams" (Atlantic #2014) (2/1959) (The Crescendos)
- "Louella"/"Salt Mine" (JC #118) (1961) (The Sevilles) (probably included Prentice Moreland)
- "Stompin'" (Savage Kick SK 502)
- "Holy Mack'rel"

=== Various artists compilations ===
- Del-Fi Doo Wop Volume 3: Honey For Sale (Del-Fi #71258) (1998)
- Johnny Otis Orchestra: Rock 'N' Roll Hit Parade (Ace #774) (2000)
- Group Harmony & Jump: The Legendary Dig Masters, Volume 5 (Ace #759) (2000)
- Dot Doo Wop, Volume 6 (Dot #1016)
- Dot Doo Wop, Volume 7 (Dot #1017)
- Holy Mackerel!: Pretenders To Little Richard's Throne (Ace #1121) (2009)
