= Booted (song) =

1952 song by Roscoe Gordon

"Booted"is a 1952 song by Roscoe Gordon. The single was released on both the RPM and Chess labels, and was the most successful of the four chart entries of Gordon's career. "Booted" went to number one on the US Billboard R&B chart.
