= Rock Me All Night Long =

Single by The Ravens
- Released: July 1952
- Genre: R&B
- Label: Mercury

"Rock Me All Night Long" is a song written by Jimmy Ricks and Bill Sanford and performed by their vocal group, The Ravens. It was released on Mercury Records in July 1952 with "Write Me One Sweet Letter" as the "B" side. The song peaked on November 8, 1952, at No. 4 on the Billboard R&B juke box chart. On the Billboard regional R&B sales charts, it reached No. 1 in Chicago and No. 2 in New York and Detroit, and No. 8 on the R&B best sellers chart. It ranked No. 22 in juke box plays on the Billboard Top R&B Records of 1952. It was The Ravens' only major chart hit.

The lyrics tell of having his woman leave him. He is all alone and needs "somebody to rock me all night long." The lyrics vary between seeking someone to "rock me" all night to needing someone to "love me all night long" and "squeeze me all night long."

Ella Mae Morse covered the song with backing from Big Dave and His Orchestra on her 1954 Capitol Records album Barrelhouse, Boogie, and the Blues.

The song's title phrase, "rock me", was an early 20th century euphemism for having sexual intercourse. The phrase was previously used by Trixie Smith on her 1922 song "My Man Rocks Me (with One Steady Roll)," and by Sister Rosetta Tharpe in her 1938 song "Rock Me", and was later used by Muddy Waters in his 1957 song "Rock Me" and by B. B. King in his 1964 song "Rock Me Baby".

The Ravens' version of the song has also been included on numerous compilations, including Chart Toppin' Doo Woppin', Vol. 1: Rock Me All Night Long (2005) We're Gonna Rock: We're Gonna Roll (2005), and The Blues Had a Baby...They Called It Rock 'N' Roll (2006).
