= RPM Records =

RPM Records is the name of:

- RPM Records (United Kingdom)
- RPM Records (United States)
