= Ramblin' Tommy Scott =

American musician

- Born: Thomas Scott; June 24, 1917; Toccoa, Georgia, United States
- Died: September 30, 2013 (aged 96) Toccoa, Georgia, United States
- Genres: Country music, rockabilly
- Occupations: Musician, vocalist
- Instrument: Guitar
- Years active: 1933-2013
- Labels: Federal, 4 Star, Request, Katona

Ramblin' Tommy Scott performs the traditional tune She'll Come Be Rolling Around The Mountain. From History of WWVA Jamboree USA, ca. 1930's

Ramblin' Tommy Scott (June 24, 1917 – September 30, 2013), aka "Doc" Tommy Scott, was an American country and rockabilly musician.

== Biography ==
Thomas Scott was born outside of Toccoa, Georgia, United States, and began playing the guitar at age ten. After high school he joined Doc Chamberlain's medicine show, and got his first job in radio on WTFL in Athens, Georgia in 1933. He also sold Vim Herb on the radio. After Chamberlain retired and gave Scott the patent medicines, he landed a regular job fronting the Uncle Pete and Minervy show on Raleigh, North Carolina's WPTF, and soon after this he was offered a job with Charlie Monroe becoming the first Kentucky Partner as a feature act - Rambling Scotty. He performed on the WWVA Jamboree in Wheeling, West Virginia with Monroe and was also a frequent soloist there, and did skits involving ventriloquism and blackface. Monroe and Scott started the Man-O-Ree medicine company selling Scott's patent laxative over the radio. The group moved to WHAS in Louisville, Kentucky, where he did the early morning show. His medicine and musical partnership came to an end with Monroe and he soon launched a tent show with Curly Seckler.

He married his wife Frankie in 1940; the couple had a daughter, Sandra; both women became part of his stage show, his films and TV shows. In the 1940s he did radio transcriptions which were broadcast nationwide. By 1942 he had his own stage show traveling coast to coast, 'Ramblin' Tommy Scott's Hollywood Hillbilly Jamboree'. He began the Herb-O-Lac Medicine Company and later Katona Medicine Company selling laxatives and liniments. He soon joined the Grand Ole Opry and later went to Hollywood to begin a career in film and TV.

Beginning with Carolina Cotton in 1949, Scott's road show, which operated six days per week from January through early December, featured Scott with some guest stars from film and TV. Amongst those appearing were "Fuzzy" Al St. John, David "Stringbean" Akeman, Tim McCoy, Clyde Moody, Johnny Mack Brown, Sunset Carson, and Randall Franks. The show traveled consistently until the mid-1990s and intermittently until his death.

Bluegrass Music Hall of Famer Curly Seckler recorded with Scott numerous times throughout his career. Earliest recordings date to the 1940s with the most recent in the 1980s. Scott recorded consistently from the 1930s-2000s and released a number of solo sides in the 1950s and 1960s which branched into rockabilly. According to the introduction of his autobiography, Snake Oil, Superstars and Me, published in 2007 and co-authored by Randall Franks and Shirley Noe Swiesz, Scott was then 90 years old. His wife died in 2004.

Scott died in September 2013.

== Discography ==
Year	Title	Record label
1951	"Rockin’ and Rollin'" / "You Done Me Wrong"	Federal Records
1955	"Dance With Her, Henry" / "Jumpin' From Six To Six"	4 Star Records
1955	"Dig Me Little Mama" / "Cat Music"	4 Star Records
1960	"Cats and Dogs" / "Here Today and Gone Tomorrow"	Request Records
196?	"Lovesick and Lonesome" / "Rainbow In My Dreams"	Katona Records
196?	"Nobody But You" / "Juke Joint Girl"	Katona Records
196?	"Bay Sho Del" / "Thibodeaux"	Katona Records
196?	EP: Don't You Go Chicken: "Alone With A Memory"; "Four Tired Cat"; "Bay Sho Del"; "Flea Circus"; "Rosebuds"	Katona Records

=== Compilations ===
- 1980: Early Radio 1941 (Old Homestead) with Curly Seckler
