= Dorothy Ellis =

- Also known as: Miss Blues
- Born: Dorthy Fay Choncie; September 24, 1935; Direct, Lamar County, Texas, United States
- Died: September 1, 2018 (aged 82) Oklahoma City, Oklahoma, United States
- Genres: Blues
- Occupations: Singer, songwriter
- Instrument: Vocals
- Years active: 1942–2018

Dorothy Ellis (September 24, 1935 – September 1, 2018) was an American blues singer and songwriter, who was inducted into the Oklahoma Jazz Hall of Fame in 2011, having been an inductee of the Oklahoma Blues Hall of Fame in 2004. She was known as Miss Blues and was often billed under that moniker. Ellis performed across eight decades, releasing two singles in her teenage years, including the dirty blues number, "Drill Daddy Drill", and a number of albums later in life.

== Life and career ==
She was born Dorthy (sic) Fay Choncie in Direct, Lamar County, Texas, United States. Her parents were Ray Choncie and Carrie Anderson. Dorthy was born on a Texas sharecropping cotton plantation, where her mother worked and where she started toiling at the age of six. She copied her mother who enjoyed singing, particularly the Lead Belly song, "Good Morning Blues". Just months later, Ellis herself got paid for singing that song one Easter Sunday at a nearby juke joint. However, when Ellis was at the age of 11, her mother collapsed in the fields and died from heat stroke. Ellis went to live with a grandmother in Wellington, Texas, before uprooting to a homeless family shelter in Paris, Texas. In 1948, and using all her savings she caught a bus to Oklahoma City, where she lived the rest of her life. After finding employment as a domestic worker in the Brockaway Home for Girls, she performed regularly in Oklahoma City's Deep Deuce area, and carried forward her Miss Blues moniker performing in a 'Texas shout blues' style, inspired by the whoops and hollers of Southern preachers.

In January 1952, Ellis recorded four tracks for Federal Records, including the dirty blues number, "Drill Daddy Drill". Around that time she married John Ellis, with whom she played in The Rockin' Aces. The outfit included her husband on piano, Little Eddie Taylor playing guitar and D.C. Minner, who supplied bass guitar. In 1955, Ellis purchased a property with her husband, and lived there both prior to his death in 2008, and until her own demise. Ellis continued to appear live and variously performed with Richard "Groove" Holmes, Little Joe Blue, Drink Small, and for Bo Diddley. She also opened for B.B. King, who provided Ellis with an autographed setlist. Her local reputation was secured over the years, but Ellis turned down approaches from major record labels, including recording contracts. Ellis stated "I was like Frank Sinatra, you know, he did it his way. I may never be famous famous, but at least I did it my way. And I don't give a shit".

As well as work on stage, Ellis worked towards a Master's Degree in Counseling Psychology from the University of Central Oklahoma, and wrote two self-published books, For Blacks Only (1979) and Hoe Cakes and Collard Greens. In 1997, Ellis recorded her debut album, Reminiscence of the Blues, which was issued by Crying Tone Records. The American funk band, Blinddog Smokin', was present at one of her concerts and afterwards offered Ellis studio time, which led to the joint recording of Sittin' in with Blinddog Smokin' (2001), released by Hapi Skratch Records.

Ellis was inducted into the Oklahoma Blues Hall of Fame in 2004. In 2006, she conducted a symposium and accompanying dance at the Gerontological Society of America. In 2008, SkinnerAudio issued her album, Bad Prospects. She performed at the Dusk Til Dawn Blues Festival in Rentiesville, Oklahoma. Ellis was inducted into the Oklahoma Jazz Hall of Fame in 2011. The institution then later staged the 'Oklahoma Jazz Hall of Fame presents Blues, Brews & BBQ' with Ellis as the headline act. In September 2013, her '78th Birthday Bash' was also hosted at the Jazz Hall of Fame. Around that time, Ellis loaned the Oklahoma Historical Society her photos and memorabilia for use in its collection. Ellis has also been featured in magazines including Elmore.

Ellis wrote or co-wrote eight of the ten tracks on her final album, Blues with an Attitude (2012). In 2014, she was in hospital struggling with the effects of pneumonia, which led to her being resuscitated on three occasions. The drama was compounded when, upon returning home after months of treatment, Ellis discovered her house had been subject to a burglary with her losing jewelry, coins and photographs from her lengthy life and career.

Ellis died on September 1, 2018, at the age of 82.

== Compilation album re-releases ==
"Drill Daddy Drill" was included in the compilation album, He Got Out His Big Ten Inch: Risque R&B and Rude Blues, released in 2005 by Indigo Records. It was also featured on another compilation, Eat to the Beat: The Dirtiest of the Dirty Blues (2006, Bear Family Records), among many other such compilations.

== Discography ==
=== Singles ===
Year	A-side	B-side	Record label	Accreditation
1952	"Slowly Going Out of Your Mind"	"He's Gone"	Federal Records	Dorothy Ellis
1952	"Drill Daddy Drill"	"Must Go Out and Play"	Federal Records	Dorothy Ellis

=== Albums ===
Year	Title	Record label	Accreditation
1997	Reminiscence of the Blues	Crying Tone Records	Miss Blues
2001	Sittin' in with Blinddog Smokin	Hapi Skratch Records	Miss Blues & Blinddog Smokin'
2008	Bad Prospects	SkinnerAudio	Miss Blues
2012	Blues with an Attitude	SkinnerAudio	Miss Blues
