= The Road to Memphis =

- Directed by: Richard Pearce
- Written by: Robert Gordon
- Produced by: Robert Kenner
- Starring: B. B. King; Bobby Rush; Rosco Gordon; Ike Turner
- Cinematography: Richard Pearce
- Edited by: Charlton McMillan
- Distributed by: BBC
- Release date: September 30, 2003
- Running time: 119 min
- Countries: Germany; United Kingdom

The Road to Memphis is a documentary directed by Richard Pearce. The film is part of The Blues, a seven part PBS series, with Martin Scorsese as the executive producer.

== Synopsis ==
The Road to Memphis follows the career of Blues musician B.B. King as he returns to his hometown where he got his start at WDIA radio station. It features interviews and performances by B.B. King, Bobby Rush, Rosco Gordon and Ike Turner as they come together in Memphis for the W. C. Handy awards in 2002. The film also contains historical footage of Howlin' Wolf and Rufus Thomas.

== Critical reception ==
Variety (September 6, 2003):

Road to Memphis" is about the blues in the here and now — historical footage is kept to a minimum — and it establishes the notion that this remains a hard life for anyone who chooses it...Pic's cornerstone is a reunion show of the four Memphis artists, and Pearce introduces them in a hierarchical scale: King is a passenger in his well-appointed bus; Rush is his own bus driver. Everyone seems to know Ike Turner, whose musical reputation keeps doors open; Gordon pleads for recognition.
