= Ted Taylor (singer) =

American musical artist (1933–1987)

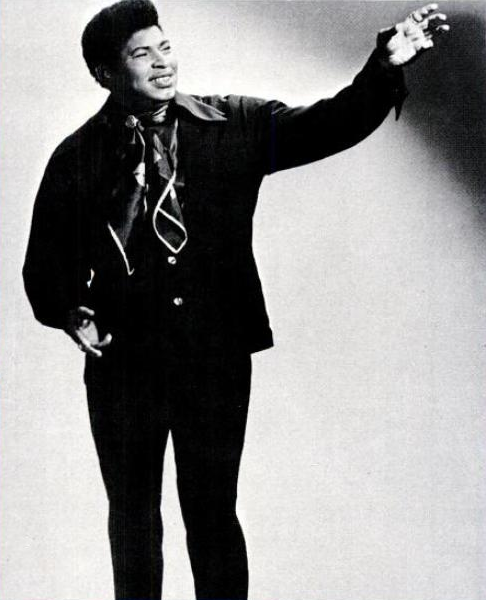
- Ted Taylor in 1969

Background information
- Also known as: Ivory Lucky
- Born: Theodore Taylor; February 16, 1934; Okmulgee, Oklahoma, U.S.
- Died: October 23, 1987 (aged 53) Lake Charles, Louisiana, U.S.
- Genres: Soul, gospel, doo-wop
- Occupation: Singer
- Years active: Mid 1950s – 1987
- Labels: Modern, RPM, Melatone, Ebb, Duke, Top Rank International, Laurie, Warwick, Gold Eagle, Soncraft, Apt, Okeh, Epic, Atco, Jewel, Ronn, Alarm, Solpugids, SPG

Theodore Taylor (February 16, 1933 – October 23, 1987), also known as Ivory Lucky, was an American soul singer.

== Biography ==
Taylor was born in Okmulgee, Oklahoma, and moved to California in 1952. He became a member of the Mighty Clouds of Joy gospel group, before joining the Santa Monica Soul Seekers as a tenor singer. In 1955, the Soul Seekers approached Maxwell Davis at Modern Records for a recording deal, and he persuaded them to concentrate on secular R&B music. The same group recorded as both The Cadets on Modern and The Jacks on the subsidiary RPM label. Taylor sang lead vocals on The Cadets' "Do You Wanna Rock (Hey Little Girl)" and "I Cry" and also on The Jacks' "Away" and "My Darling." He did not appear on The Cadets' biggest hit, "Stranded In The Jungle" in 1955; for that session, he was replaced by Prentice Moreland.

Taylor left the group, and recorded two singles on Melatone Records in 1957 with the Bob Reed orchestra on which he was credited for contractual reasons as "Ivory Lucky". Over the next seven years, he recorded singles for a succession of labels including Ebb, Duke, Top Rank International, Laurie, Warwick, Gold Eagle, Soncraft, and Apt.

He was influenced by such singers as Little Willie John, Clyde McPhatter and Jackie Wilson. At Duke, he made the first recording of the ballad "Be Ever Wonderful" in 1959. Although he had several regional hits, and released an album, Ted Taylor Sings, on Warwick in 1963, he did not achieve national commercial success until his 1965 recording on Okeh Records of "Stay Away From My Baby" reached number 14 on the Billboard R&B chart and number 99 on the pop chart, his only national pop chart entry. He also released three albums on Okeh, Be Ever Wonderful (1963), Blues & Soul (1965) and Ted Taylor's Greatest Hits (1966).

After further singles on Okeh, Epic, Atco and Jewel, Taylor worked with Ronn label in 1967. He remained on the label for seven years, and had several further R&B chart hits including "It's Too Late" (1969), "Something Strange is Going On in My House" (1970), and "How's Your Love Life Baby" (1971). He also issued several albums, including You Can Dig It! and Taylor Made on Ronn. His final chart hit: "Steal Away", was issued on the Alarm label of Shreveport, Louisiana in 1976. He continued to record on his own Solpugids and SPG labels until his death.

Taylor died in a car crash in Lake Charles, Louisiana in 1987, aged 53.

== Discography ==
=== Chart singles ===
Year	Title	Chart Positions	
Year	Title	Billboard Hot 100	US R&B Singles
1960	"Look Out"	105	-
1963	"I'll Release You"	134	-
1963	"Be Ever Wonderful"	123	-
1963	"You Give Me Nothing To Go On"	104	-
1965	"(Love Is Like a) Ramblin' Rose"	132	-
1965	"Stay Away From My Baby"	99	14
1966	"Daddy's Baby"	129	-
1969	"It's Too Late"	118	30
1970	"Somethin' Strange Is Goin' On In My House"	-	26
1971	"How's Your Love Life Baby"	-	44
1973	"What a Fool"	-	93
1976	"Steal Away"	-	64

=== Albums ===
- Ted Taylor Sings (Warwick 2049) (1961)
- Be Ever So Wonderful (Okeh 12104/14104) (1963)
- Blues and Soul (Okeh 12109/14109) (1965)
- Greatest Hits (Okeh 12113/14113) (1966)
- Shades of Blue (Ronn LPS-7528) (1969)
- You Can Dig It! (Ronn LPS-7529) (1970)
- Taylor Made (Ronn LPS-7531) (1972)
- The Super Taylors (Ronn LPS-7533) (1973) (with Little Johnny Taylor)
- Ted Taylor (Alarm 1000) (1976)
- Keeping My Head Above Water (MCA 305) (1978)
- Keep Walking On (Charly CRB-1011) (France) (1980) (compilation album)
- Be Ever So Wonderful (Solpugdits 1001) (1985)
- Taylor Made For You (Solpugdits 1002) (1987)
- Somebody’s Always Trying (Mr. R&B 1005) (Sweden) (1987)

== Sampling ==
Taylor's music has been sampled throughout hip-hop. Most notably, Taylor's song "Be Ever Wonderful" was sampled by Ludacris in "Splash Waterfalls" from his 2003, fourth studio album, Chicken-n-Beer. Following that, Taylor's "Be Ever Wonderful" was sampled by Kendrick Lamar in "Duckworth", from his Pulitzer Prize winning 2017, fourth studio album, Damn.

Taylor's song "I Can't Fake It Anymore" from his 1978 album, Keeping My Head Above Water, was sampled by the hip-hop duo Dead Prez in their song "The Hood" (sometimes referred to as "For the Hood") from an advance version of their 2004, second studio album, RBG: Revolutionary but Gangsta.

Wayne Kramer of the MC5 said that Taylor's version of "(Love Is Like a) Ramblin' Rose" influenced the MC5's version.
