= Drill Daddy Drill =

Single by Dorothy Ellis
- B-side: "Must Go Out and Play"
- Released: April 1952
- Recorded: January 16, 1952
- Genre: Dirty blues, R&B
- Length: 2:55
- Label: Federal Records 12070
- Songwriter(s): Ravon Darnell, Mario Delagarde

"Drill Daddy Drill" is a dirty blues song, recorded by Dorothy Ellis and released as a single on Federal Records in April 1952. The B-side of the record was "Must Go Out and Play". Both songs were penned by Ravon Darnell (who, using his real name Rick Darnell, co-wrote the blues standard, "The Thrill Is Gone") and Mario Delagarde. Delagarde was the regular double bass player with Johnny Otis and His Orchestra.

== History ==
The song was recorded on January 16, 1952, in Los Angeles, California, by Ellis with backing by Johnny Otis and His Orchestra. The personnel involved were Dorothy Ellis (vocal), Lee Graves (trumpet), George Washington (trombone), Rene Bloch (alto saxophone), Ben Webster (tenor saxophone), Lorenzo Holderness (tenor saxophone), Walter Henry (baritone saxophone), Devonia Williams (piano), Pete Lewis (guitar), Mario Delagarde (double bass) and Leard Bell (drums). Webster supplied his tenor saxophone playing to the track, which was described as "excellent but ordinary".

The release of the single was listed in Billboard's issue dated May 3, 1952. Cash Box in its May 17, 1952, periodical, was more forthcoming with its short review noting the main track as "A hustling bounce novelty with double entendre lyrics is treated to a forceful reading by thrush Dorothy Ellis". At the date of the recording, Ellis was just over 16 years and three months old.

== Wording ==
The song's lyrics were liberally sprinkled with the usage of double entendres. The verb 'drill' was used in either of its various descriptive terms as "produce (a hole) in something by or as if by boring with a drill", and "meaning to have sex from a male perspective". This is exemplified in the song's lyric, "When one well goes dry, we'll use another hole".

== Worth ==
A copy of the original vinyl single sold in May 2017 for $204.37.

== Compilation album re-releases ==
The track was included in the compilation album, He Got Out His Big Ten Inch: Risque R&B and Rude Blues, released in 2005 by Indigo Records. It was also featured on another compilation, Eat to the Beat: The Dirtiest of the Dirty Blues (2006, Bear Family Records), among many other such compilations.
