= Blinddog Smokin' =

Blinddog Smokin' is an American funk band. Their original funk music also incorporates roots, rock, blues, gospel and soul stylings. Over two decades they have performed internationally, across America, recorded twelve albums, and produced sixty-one original songs. They have also collaborated with Bobby Rush and Dr. John.

== History ==
Blinddog Smokin' was formed in 1994 by front man, singer, and harmonica player Carl Gustafson and guitarist Jason Coomes in Laramie, Wyoming. Today the band is composed of drummer Chuck Gullens, bassist Roland Bacon who joined in 2000, keyboardist Mo Beeks who joined in 2009, backup singer Chris White and guitarist, Chalo Ortiz who joined in 2010, backup singer Linda Gustafson who joined in 2011, and finally percussionist/saxophonist, Fabian Antonio Chavez, who came on board in 2015.

Across the span of their career they have toured extensively, averaging around 200 gigs per year. From 1993 to 2011, Blinddog Smokin' was signed to Crying Tone Records, distributed by Hapi Skratch Records. In 2014, Silver Talon Records was established in Los Angeles and has put out releases by, Dr. John, Bobby Rush, and Blinddog Smokin'. The label is distributed by City Hall Records. They have performed three times on the main stage at the King Biscuit Blues Festival, twice on the main stage at the Tulsa Blues Festival, and were the house band for the Snowy Range Blues Festival for six consecutive years. They are the first national-touring funk band to come out of Wyoming.

== Collaborations ==
Blinddog Smokin' has shared the stage with a number of notable artists over the years. In 2013 they performed at Nashville's syndicated Music City Roots series, where they played with Jim Lauderdale, Sarah Jarosz, North Mississippi Allstars, John Fullbright, Bobby Rush. In their set as the house band of the Snowy Range Music Festival they featured MarchFourth Marching Band, the Soul Rebels, Grammy-winning artist Billy Branch, Bobby Rush, and The University of Wyoming's Symphony Orchestra. The band began to reach acclaim after their collaboration with producer Donny Markowitz (Oscar and Grammy winning songwriter for smash hit "I've Had the Time of My Life" from Dirty Dancing) and engineer Tony Sheppherd (Whitney Houston, Kenny Loggins) in 2011 with their album Up From the Tracks.

=== Decisions ===
Decisions features a number of well known blues, funk, and gospel performers. Joining the band on “Another Murder in New Orleans” is Grammy-winning artist Dr. John. The song has been licensed by the national non-profit organization Crimestoppers for their New Orleans chapter and premiered with a music video on The Wall Street Journal, directed by Jennifer DeLia and produced by Julie Pacino (daughter of Oscar-winner Al Pacino). The album debuted at No. 6 on the Blues radio chart and charted on Americana radio, its received glowing press from The Wall Street Journal to USA Today to Living Blues, radio play on Sirius XM's B.B. King's Bluesville, and a music video in rotation on MTV, VH1, and Dish. The album was also nominated for 'Best Blues Album' at the 2015 Grammy Awards. It features all original tracks written by Carl Gustafson or a combination of Gustafson, Rush, and Markowitz, and was released on Silver Talon Records and distributed City Hall Records.

== Awards ==
- 2015 Grammy Nominee for Best Blues Album with Bobby Rush (feat. Dr. John)
- 2015 Blues Music Award nominee for Song of the Year ("Another Murder in New Orleans" written by Carl Gustafson, Donny Markowitz, performed by: Dr. John, Bobby Rush, Blinddog Smokin') and nominee for Best Soul Blues Album (Memphis, TN)
- 2014 Blues Blast Music Award winner for Best Soul Blues Album (Champaign, IL)
- 2014 Best of the Beat Award winner for Best Blues Album (New Orleans, LA)
- Dubbed the Ultimate Road Warriors by Southland Blues Magazine

== Discography ==
- Blinddog Smokin' Cassette (1994)
- Start Packin CD (1994)
- Ain't From Mississippi CD (Crying Tone Records 1995)
- Body Droppin' Blues: Live at Slocum's CD (Crying Tone Records 1996)
- More Trouble Than Worth CD (Crying Tone Records 1998)
- Back of Beyond CD (Crying Tone Records 1999)
- Sittin' in with Blinddog Smokin feat. Miss Blues CD (Hapi Skratch 2001)
- Friends feat. Bobby Rush CD (Crying Tone Records 2002)
- Angels at the Crossroads CD (Crying Tone Records 2010)
- Up From the Tracks CD (Silver Talon Records 2011)
- "Another Murder in New Orleans" Single (Silver Talon Records 2013)
- Decisions (Silver Talon Records/City Hall 2014)
- High Steppin' (Silver Talon Records/City Hall 2015)
