= Caleb Ginyard =

American singer-songwriter (1910–1978)

- Also known as: Junior Caleb "J.C." Ginyard
- Born: Caleb Nathaniel Ginyard Jr; January 15, 1910; St. Matthews, South Carolina, U.S.
- Died: August 11, 1978 (aged 68) Basel, Switzerland
- Genres: Gospel, doo-wop
- Occupations: Singer, songwriter
- Formerly of: The Jubalaires, The Golden Gate Quartet, the Dixieaires, the Du Droppers, the Buccaneers, the 4-Loggers, the Baranovas, Eternal Light

Caleb Nathaniel Ginyard Jr. (possibly January 15, 1910 – August 11, 1978), known as Junior Caleb "J. C." Ginyard, was an American gospel and doo-wop singer and songwriter who performed with various vocal groups between the 1930s and 1970s, including the Royal Harmony Singers, the Jubalaires, and the Du Droppers.

There is some uncertainty over his birth date and name. The Encyclopedia of South Carolina Jazz and Blues Musicians suggests, on the basis of U.S. Census information, that he was born in 1908 in Calhoun County, South Carolina, though he always claimed a birth date in January 1910. He was probably born Caleb Nathaniel Ginyard, but he was also noted as Junior Caleb (J.C.) Ginyard (his father being Caleb Ginyard Sr.) or as Julius Caleb Ginyard. He got the name Ginyard from his father, who was a slave in South Carolina, where he got this name from his slave owner.

He sang in his church as a youth before becoming a professional singer as a tenor (later baritone). He started his singing career as one of the founders of the Royal Harmony Singers in Jacksonville, Florida, in 1936. They moved to Philadelphia in 1941. The group worked on the Arthur Godfrey radio show in New York and later renamed their group as the Jubalaires, appearing in several movies and shorts. In 1947 Ginyard left the Jubalaires to form a new group, the Dixieaires, who remained together with a varying membership until the mid-1950s.

In 1952, Ginyard also formed a secular vocal group the Du Droppers. The group recorded "Can't Do Sixty No More", and had two hit records in 1953, "I Wanna Know" and "I Found Out (What You Do When You Go 'Round There)". All were either written or co-written by Ginyard. He left both the Du Droppers and Dixieaires in 1955, and joined the Golden Gate Quartet. After work entertaining US troops, the group settled in Europe in 1959. In 1971, Ginyard left the group and settled in Basel, Switzerland, where he died in 1978 at the age of 68. He was married to Janie Elnora, née Flowers in USA having five children and also to Gunilla in Sweden having two children.
