= Federal Records =

American record label

- Founded: 1950
- Country of origin: United States

Federal Records was an American record label founded in 1950 as a subsidiary of Syd Nathan's King Records and based in Cincinnati, Ohio. It was run by record producer Ralph Bass and was mainly devoted to rhythm & blues releases. The company also released hillbilly and rockabilly recordings from 1951 onward, e.g., "Rockin' and Rollin" by Ramblin' Tommy Scott on Federal 10003. Singles were published on both 45 and 78 rpm speed formats.

Federal issued such classics as the Dominoes' "Sixty Minute Man", and "Have Mercy Baby" as well as Hank Ballard & the Midnighters' "Work with Me, Annie" which was opposed immediately by the Federal Communications Commission (FCC) but went on to be an enormous hit.

James Brown was touring with the Famous Flames when they were signed to Federal in 1956. The group's first Federal single, "Please, Please, Please", was a regional hit and eventually sold a million copies.

Between 1962 and 1965, Freddie King, one of the three blues "kings" (Freddie, B.B. and Albert), released a series of albums, mostly instrumentals, for Federal.

Johnny "Guitar" Watson was another artist on Federal Records.

== Selected discography ==
=== Singles ===
Catalog No.	Release date	US	US R&B	Single (A-side, B-side)	Artist
12001	Dec 1950		6	"Do Something For Me" b/w "Chicken Blues"	The Dominoes
10003	Mar 1951			"Rockin’ and Rollin'" b/w "You Done Me Wrong"	Tommy Scott
12022	May 1951	17	1	"Sixty Minute Man" b/w "I Can't Escape From You"	The Dominoes
12055	Dec 1951		8	"Ring-A-Ding-Doo" b/w "The Crying Blues"	Little Esther and Mel with the J. And O. Orchestra
12068	1952		1	"Have Mercy Baby" b/w "Deep Sea Blues"	The Dominoes
12070	1952			"Drill Daddy Drill" b/w "Must Go Out and Play"	Dorothy Ellis
12114	Dec 1952		3	"The Bells"	Billy Ward & His Dominoes
12114	Dec 1952		4	"Pedal Pushin' Papa"	Billy Ward & His Dominoes
12169	Apr 1954		1	"Work with Me Annie" b/w "Until I Die"	The Midnighters
12195	Aug 1954		1	"Annie Had A Baby" b/w "She's The One"	The Midnighters
12200	Oct 1954		10	Annie's Aunt Fannie b/w "Crazy Loving (Stay With Me)"	The Midnighters
12265	Apr 1956			"I'm Tore Up" b/w "If I Never Had Known You"	Billy Gayles with Ike Turner's Rhythm Rockers
12258	Mar 1956		6	"Please, Please, Please" b/w "Why Do You Do Me"	James Brown with the Famous Flames
12283	Oct 1956			"What Can It Be" b/w "Gonna Wait For My Chance"	Jackie Brenston with Ike Turner's Kings of Rhythm
12284	Nov 1956			"Flaming Love" b/w "My Baby's Tops"	The Gardenias
12297	May 1957			"Do You Mean It" b/w "She Made My Blood Run Cold"	Ike Turner & His Orchestra
12337	Oct 1958	48	1	"Try Me" b/w "Tell Me What I Did Wrong"	James Brown and the Famous Flames
12370	May 1960	33	7	"Think"	James Brown and the Famous Flames
12370	May 1960	86	14	"You've Got the Power"	James Brown and the Famous Flames
12401	Jan 1961	29	5	"Hide Away" b/w "I Love the Woman"	Freddie King
12524	Jul 1964			"Uncle Willie's Got A Thing Goin' On" b/w "Our Kind Of Love"	Willie Dixon and the Big Wheels

== See also ==
- List of record labels
