= No More Doggin' =

Single by Roscoe Gordon
- B-side: "Maria"
- Released: March 1952
- Recorded: 1952
- Genre: R&B
- Label: RPM
- Songwriter: Gordon

Roscoe Gordon singles chronology
"Booted" (1952)	"No More Doggin'" (1952)	"What You Got On Your Mind" (1952)

"No More Doggin'" is a rhythm and blues song written and originally recorded by blues musician Rosco Gordon in 1952. The song featured Gordon's signature "Rosco Rhythm" piano style which became a precursor to Jamaican ska music.

== Recording and release ==
Rosco Gordon had originally been associated with the Beale Streeters, a loose coalition of Memphis, Tennessee musicians that also featured Johnny Ace, B.B. King, and Bobby "Blue" Bland, in the late 1940s. In 1951, Gordon was scouted by Ike Turner to record for the Bihari brothers at Modern Records. He reached the Billboard charts that fall with the single "Saddled The Cow (And Milked The Horse)," released on Modern's subsidiary, RPM Records, which peaked at No. 9 on the Most Played Juke Box R&B Records chart. In March 1952, "Booted," topped the Best Selling R&B Records chart.

In early 1952, Gordon recorded "No More Doggin'" at musician Tuff Green's house in Memphis, backed by Ike Turner also on piano. "No More Doggin'" was released on RPM in March 1952. The record reached No. 3 on the Billboard Best Selling R&B Records chart on April 19, 1952. It peaked higher at No. 2 on the Most Played Juke Box R&B Records chart on May 10, 1952.

== Influence ==
''No More Doggin''' became a popular song in Jamaica and laid down the foundation for the development of ska music. "Towards the end of the 50s Jamaicans got keen on rhythm and blues, particularly a record called 'No More Dogin' sung by Rosco Gordon," said Island Records founder, Chris Blackwell. "They got hold of this beat, cheered it up a bit, added some lyrics and called it ska....From 1959 onwards this was all the rage." Ska music evolved into rocksteady and then became reggae music.

Jamaican singer Laurel Aitken, one of the pioneers of ska, was inspired to record "Boogie in My Bones" (1958) after hearing "No More Doggin'. Influenced by Gordon's "Roscoe Rhythm" piano style, Aitken and fellow Jamaican musicians Owen Gray and Theophilus Beckford emulated the rhythm, adding guitar and horns.
