= The Cadets (group) =

American doo-wop group

- Origin: Los Angeles, California, United States
- Genres: Doo-wop, R&B
- Years active: 1947-1957
- Labels: [[Modern Records|Modern]]

The Cadets were an American doo-wop group, formed in Los Angeles, California, United States. The group began as a gospel group, the Santa Monica Soul Seekers, in the late 1940s. The members were Lloyd McCraw, Willie Davis, Austin "Ted" Taylor, Aaron Collins, Glendon Kingsby, and Will "Dub" Jones. In 1955, the group auditioned for Modern Records, and were accepted. The group decided to switch to the popular R&B style, with the exception of Kingsby, who left to continue in gospel music.

== Career ==
Modern came up with the name The Cadets, and the group released their first single, "Don't Be Angry"/"I Cry". Collins led the A side while Taylor led the flip side. The group followed with several more singles. One of them was slated to be a cover of The Feathers' "Why Don't You Write Me?" Modern worried that this single may compete with "Don't Be Angry", so it was recorded on their subsidiary label, RPM Records, and was credited to "The Jacks". Davis led "Why Don't You Write Me?", and the flip side, "Smack Dab in the Middle", was led by Jones.

Many more singles followed, with the five recording as The Cadets on Modern, and "The Jacks" on RPM. McCraw left at the end of the year, and was replaced by Pete Foxx. The group signed up to the Buck Ram management agency in March 1956, and continued churning out singles. A few months later, Taylor left to pursue a solo career.

He was replaced for one session by Prentice Moreland. This particular session was instrumental, however. It was the recording of "Stranded in the Jungle", a cover of an already popular tune by The Jay Hawks. The song was spoken by Dub, with a duet refrain by Davis and Collins. The flip side, "I Want You", was led by Jones. It was Moreland who delivered the line, "Great Googa Mooga! Lemme outta here!" in "Stranded in the Jungle." Following that session, Davis, Collins, Jones, and Foxx continued as a quartet.

They continued recording under both names, but toured only as The Cadets. They would, however, perform Jacks songs onstage. Collins was drafted that summer, with his place taken for a short time by the returning Ted Taylor. After only a matter of weeks, Collins was able to return to the group, and Taylor was back out.

1957 saw albums released under both the Jacks and Cadets names, under Modern and RPM, respectively. Confusing to many was the use of Cadets tracks on the Jacks album, and vice versa. That year the group stopped touring, without any big hits since "Stranded". In May, there was a single release by "Aaron Collins and the Cadets", which was Collins backed by studio singers. In November, the four were back together for one more release.

At the end of the year, the group split. Collins and Davis joined The Flairs. Foxx became a guitar instructor and continues (as of date of post; 30 December 2009) to give lessons out of his studio in Los Angeles, California; Jones joined The Coasters. A few recordings were made with the Cadets name in 1960; however, this was effectively recorded by Davis and Collins with the Flairs.

The group reformed in the late 1990s, with Davis, Foxx, Randy Jones, and Tommy Turner. This lineup appeared on the PBS special, Doo Wop 51. In 2001, while rehearsing for a show with the Doo Wop Society of Southern California, Jones had to be rushed to the hospital, requiring the other three to perform as a trio at the performance. Jones had suffered a stroke, and died thirteen months later. The group brought in new bass Ed Carter.

Willie Davis died on February 20, 2011, from complications of Alzheimer's Disease.
