= Have Mercy Baby =

1952 song by Billy Ward and Rose Marks

Single by Billy Ward and the Dominoes
- B-side: "Deep Sea Blues"
- Released: April 1952
- Recorded: January 28, 1952
- Genre: Rhythm and blues
- Label: Federal
- Songwriters: Billy Ward, Rose Marks

Billy Ward and the Dominoes singles chronology
"That's What You're Doing to Me" (1952)	"Have Mercy Baby" (1952)	"No Room" (1952)

"Have Mercy Baby"

Single by James Brown

from the album Papa's Got a Brand New Bag
- B-side: "Just Won't Do Right (I Stay in the Chapel Every Night)"
- Released: 1964
- Genre: Rhythm and blues
- Length: 2:14
- Label: King; 5968
- Songwriters: Billy Ward, Rose Marks
- Producer: James Brown

James Brown charting singles chronology
"Out of Sight" (1964)	"Have Mercy Baby" (1964)	"Papa's Got a Brand New Bag Part I" (1965)

Audio video
- "Have Mercy Baby" on YouTube

"Have Mercy Baby" is a rhythm and blues song written by Billy Ward and Rose Marks. It was recorded by The Dominoes in Cincinnati, produced by Ralph Bass, and released by Federal Records in 1952. It was number one on the R&B Charts for ten non-consecutive weeks.

== Description ==
Clyde McPhatter's roots were in the black church. The song is essentially the gospel song "Have Mercy, Jesus" sung in the call-and-response style of a gospel quartet, although it is in the straight twelve-bar blues form that gospel singers disdained. In the first chorus McPhatter simply follows the melody, but subsequently he freely improvises in the gospel style with short but spectacular melismas, stringing out phrases to overlap the backup singers responses, interjecting screams and yeahs, shouting a gospel funk. The backup band lays down the rhythm and provides the expected tenor sax solo. “Have Mercy Baby” would be the final Dominoes recording to feature original bass singer, Bill Brown on background vocals. After which, Brown would help found The Checkers (American band).

== Impact ==
The Dominoes' version of "Have Mercy Baby" was the definitive rhythm and gospel record. Influenced by the group's lead singer Clyde McPhatter, its importance lies in that it was the first popular R&B recording highlighting passionate black gospel music features.

== Cover versions ==
Other significant recordings of the song were made by:

- The Bobbettes (1960), whose version went to #66 on the Hot 100.
- The Rivingtons (1962)
- James Brown (1964), whose version charted #92 Pop.
