= The Jubalaires =

American gospel group

- The Jubalaires c. 1945. From left to right: Orville Brooks, Theodore (Teddy) Brooks, Caleb Ginyard and George McFadden.

Background information
- Origin: Florida, United States
- Genres: American folk, gospel, spirituals, proto-rap
- Years active: 1935–1962
- Labels: Capitol, Decca, King
- Past members: Caleb Ginyard; Willie Johnson; Orville Brooks; Theodore Brooks; George McFadden; John Jennings; Jimmy Adams; Elijah Wright; Willie Wright

The Jubalaires were an American gospel group active between 1935 and 1962. Originally known as the Royal Harmony Singers, the band is currently (2026) known for song verses delivered in a rhythmic, rhyming style that has been described as an early version of rapping.

== History ==
The band's name was derived from Jubal, a biblical figure in Genesis who is sometimes regarded as "the father of all harpists and organists."

The band reached no. 10 on the R&B charts on November 14, 1942, with "Praise the Lord and Pass the Ammunition" a song adapted from the speech of a naval chaplain in response to the attack on Pearl Harbor the previous year. Other releases included "Before This Time Another Year" / "Ezekiel (Saw the Wheel A Rollin')" (released under the Decca Records label), "God Almighty's Gonna Cut You Down" / "Go Down Moses" (King Records), and "My God Called Me This Morning" / "Ring That Golden Bell" (King Records).

The band recorded with Andy Kirk on November 27, 1945, a session which produced the Decca Records 78rpm release "I Know" / "Get Together with the Lord" credited to Andy Kirk & His Orchestra with the Jubalaires. A third track recorded during the session, "Soothe Me", went unreleased.

In 1946, the Jubalaires secured a spot on Arthur Godfrey's CBS radio show. Willie Johnson left the Golden Gate Quartet to take the lead of the group in 1948, and in 1950 the band appeared in the musical comedy film Duchess of Idaho.

In the December 15, 1951, issue, Billboard praised the group's performance on the release "David and Goliath" / "I've Done My Work" (Capitol Records). The band's recording of "Dreaming of the Ladies in the Moon" (Crown Records) attracted the praise of Billboard magazine, which gave the record a mark of 78/100 in the April 17, 1954, issue, commenting that "The boys here come thru with a strong reading on a bright ballad with an evocative flavor." The reviewer compared the Jubalaires' treatment of the song with the style of the Mills Brothers and predicted it could become a break-out hit.

Most of the music by the Jubalaires was released by Queen Records, a King Records subsidiary specializing in African-American music. However, later reissues of their music appeared under King Records.

== Band members ==
Original members

- Orville Bryce Brooks, vocals (January 27, 1919 — August 30, 1997). He joined the ensemble in the mid-1940s as a lead tenor and recorded the crossover hit "I Know" with Andy Kirk's orchestra in 1946.
- Theodore "Ted" Brooks, baritone vocals (July 4, 1915 — September 8, 1997). He served as a foundational baritone and achieved historical recognition for his rhythmic lead performance in the 1946 musical short "Noah", a delivery cited by music historians as a major precursor to rap music.
- Caleb Nathaniel Ginyard Jr., tenor and baritone vocals (January 15, 1910 — August 11, 1978). He was a primary songwriter and founder of the ensemble. Beyond his extensive work with the Jubalaires, he later founded the Dixieaires in 1947 and the rhythm and blues group The Du Droppers in 1952.
- George Washington "Biggie" McFadden, bass vocals (November 24, 1921 — January 30, 1990). He anchored the ensemble's signature close-harmony sound and appeared in many major Hollywood feature films, including MGM's Duchess of Idaho (1950), along with the rest of the band. He is featured in countless movies that star famous singers, such as Elvis Presley.

Other members

- Willie Johnson, bass vocals and narrator (1913 — May 3, 1980). A founding bass vocalist for the Golden Gate Quartet, he joined the Jubalaires in 1948 as part of a prominent frontman trade, bringing his signature jubilee delivery to their later catalog and serving as the group's business manager.
- John Jennings
- Jimmy Adams
- Elijah Wright (bass)
- Willie Wright (tenor)
