= Rosco Gordon =

American blues singer-songwriter and pianist (1928–2002)

Background information
- Born: Rosco N. Gordon III; April 10, 1928; Memphis, Tennessee, U.S.
- Died: July 11, 2002 (aged 74) Queens, New York City, U.S.
- Genres: Memphis blues; R&B; soul; jump blues
- Occupations: Musician; singer; songwriter
- Instruments: Vocals, piano
- Years active: 1950–2002
- Labels: Sun; Chess; RPM; Duke; Vee-Jay

Rosco N. Gordon III (April 10, 1928 – July 11, 2002), sometimes billed as Roscoe Gordon, was an American blues singer, pianist, and songwriter. He is best known for his hit songs "Booted," (1952), "No More Doggin'" (1952), and "Just a Little Bit" (1960). Gordon was a pioneer of the Memphis blues style. He played piano in a style known as the "Rosco rhythm," with the emphasis on the off-beat. This rhythm was an influence on later musical styles such as Jamaican ska and reggae. In 2026 Gordon was posthumously inducted into the Blues Hall of Fame

== Biography ==
Gordon was born in Memphis, Tennessee, on April 10, 1928, the youngest of eight children. He learned to play piano from his sister who took lessons. Gordon became associated with Johnny Ace, Bobby Bland and B.B. King, sometimes referred to as the Beale Streeters. In 1946, Gordon moved to Chicago "after getting in trouble in Memphis." He returned to Memphis in 1949, and won first place at an amateur show at the Palace Theatre on Beale Street in 1950. Emcee of the show Rufus Thomas invited Gordon to play on his radio show at WDIA. Soon after, Gordon had his own show as well.

In 1951, WDIA manager, David Mattis, introduced Gordon to producer Sam Phillips. Around this time, Gordon was scouted by Ike Turner, talent scout for the Bihari brothers, to record for Modern Records. His first hit single, "Saddled the Cow (and Milk the Horse)," released on RPM Records (subsidiary of Modern) reached No. 9 on the Billboard R&B chart.

Gordon's next single "Booted" was recorded at Phillips' Memphis Recording Service. Phillips licensed the record to the Chess brothers at Chess Records, which was released as a single in December 1951. Gordon also recorded a version for the Bihari brothers at RPM, released in January 1952. The RPM release reached number-one on the Billboard R&B record chart in March 1952. The Chess and the Bihari brothers later settled the conflict, with the Biharis getting exclusive rights to Gordon and Chess signing Howlin' Wolf to an exclusive contract. For years, Gordon did not receive royalties for his songs. "Sam Phillips gave me one hundred dollars. One hundred. No royalties. No nothin'. But, I did it for the Biharis, now they gave me six hundred dollars. No royalties. No nothin'. But like I say, I didn't know any better," he said.

Gordon also had a successful record with "No More Doggin'" (No. 2 R&B) which was also released by RPM in 1952. Between 1952 and 1959, Gordon released numerous singles on Duke, Sun, Flip, and Vee-Jay Records. His last single to reach the charts was "Just a Little Bit" (No. 2 R&B, No. 64 Pop) in 1960. He was paid $250 for the song which became an R&B standard, covered by Etta James, Elvis Presley, and Jerry Butler. Gordon didn't receive royalties from the millions of copies sold in cover versions, because producer Ralph Bass at King Records stole the song from a demo Rosco sent and had it copyrighted before him.

In the late 1950s, Gordon toured internationally, reaching South America and the Caribbean, where his off-beat rhythmic technique influenced the sound of early ska and reggae.

In 1962, Gordon quit the music industry and moved to Queens, New York, with his new wife, where he purchased a partnership in a laundry business after winning a poker game with a pair of deuces. In 1969, Gordon formed his own label, Bab-Roc, operated from his home, but he did not perform again until 1981. In 1983, he released the album Rosco Rocks Again, recorded live at the 100 Club in London. Following his wife's death in 1984, he returned to touring.

In 2000, Gordon teamed up with blues guitarist Duke Robillard to release the album Memphis Tennessee. In 2002, Gordon was invited by the filmmaker Richard Pearce to be included in a documentary film about several blues musicians returning to Memphis for a tribute to Sam Phillips in conjunction with the May 2002 W.C. Handy Awards. The documentary, The Road to Memphis, aired on PBS television. Six weeks after filming finished, Gordon died at the age of 74 from a heart attack at his apartment in Rego Park, Queens, on July 11, 2002. He was survived by three daughters, Victoria, Deborah, and Ruby; three sons, Marrc, Rosco III, and Keith; a sister, Ella Gordon Jefferson; and 10 grandchildren. He was interred in the Rosedale Cemetery in Linden, New Jersey.

In 2026 Gordon was posthumously inducted into the Blues Hall of Fame.

== Discography ==
=== Albums ===
- 1983: Rosco Rocks Again (JSP Records)
- 2000: Memphis Tennessee (Stony Plain Records)
- 2004: No Dark in America (Dualtone Records)

=== Compilations ===
- 1977: The Legendary Sun Performers: Rosco Gordon (Charly Records)
- 1980: The Best of Rosco Gordon Volume One (Ace Records)
- 1982: Volume 2: The Memphis Sessions (Ace Records)
- 1993: Just a Little Bit (Vee-Jay Records)
- 1996: Rosco's Rhythm (Charly Records)
- 1998: Bootin' (The Best of the RPM Years) (Ace Records)
- 2004: A Proper Introduction to Rosco Gordon - No More Doggin' (Proper Records)
- 2009: Let's Get High: The Man About Music From Memphis (JSP Records)
- 2016: Just A Little Bit (Jasmine Records)
