= The Checkers (American band) =

American doo-wop music group

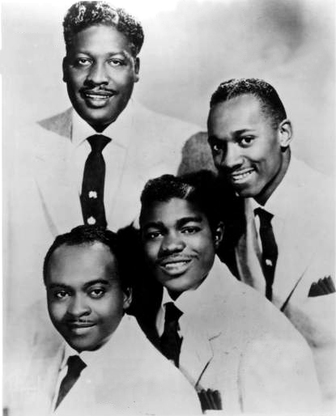
- Top left: Bill Brown. Top right: Irwin Williams. Bottom left: Buddy Brewer. Bottom right: Charlie White.

Background information
- Origin: New York City, New York, United States
- Genres: Doo-wop, R&B
- Occupation: Vocal group
- Years active: 1952–1955
- Labels: King, Federal
- Spinoff of: Billy Ward and his Dominoes
- Past members: Bill Brown; Charlie White; Irwin “Teddy” Williams; James “Buddy” Brewer; John Carnegie; Perry Heyward; “Little” David Baughan; Eddie Harris; David Martin; James Williams

The Checkers were an American doo-wop quintet (later quartet) formed in 1952. The original members were John Carnegie (tenor/lead), Charlie White (tenor/lead), Irwin "Teddy" Williams (tenor), James Turner "Buddy" Brewer (baritone), and Bill Brown (bass/primary lead). The group recorded only 25 singles (with 1 going unreleased) for King Records imprint and their subsidiary, Federal. They broke up in 1955. The most notable aspect of the group was their constantly changing sound due to several personnel changes that happened within their short existence. King kept on releasing bands under the pseudonym of "The Checkers" until the mid 1970s.

== Career ==
The group formed on 119th Street in Harlem in February 1952. Often times, the group had a fluid membership with the only constants being John Carnegie and Irwin "Teddy" Williams. With this ever changing roster, they perform on street corners, at parties, and teen hops. It was there they caught the eye of Bill Brown and Charlie White; both men had just exited The Dominoes months prior and White's deal with The Clovers had fallen through. Since there were plenty of spots to fill, they joined the group. James Turner "Buddy" Brewer was called upon to take up baritone duties. Brewer, Brown, and Joe Lamont (also an original member of the Dominoes) had been in the 5 International Gospel Singers of South Carolina together.

Of the two press photos taken, John Carnegie was in neither of them. This was believed to be because his father didn't want him in the group.

By the time early June 1952 came, they signed with King, and they were ready to cut their first records. This was the only session to feature Carnegie’s vocals which were on all 4 sides. After this, Carnegie mainly stayed in school and never recorded or performed with the Checkers again. From there on out, the group used the name "The Checkers" to compete with the Dominoes.

In January 1953, White left due to his drug problems and later that month, had joined The Clovers as had been intended in 1951. White was replaced by Perry Heyward, former lead of the Sparrows. Heyward led "Ghost of my Baby".

After a few months, Perry was replaced by David Lee "Little David" Baughan. Baughan sang falsetto on the bridge of their most famous song, a cover of The White Cliffs of Dover. Baughan also led the unreleased "A Friend in Need", "I Promise You", and "A House With No Windows".

In late spring 1954, Baughan exited the group to join The Drifters again, this time as a replacement for Clyde McPhatter. This was the catalyst for the breakup of the group. Soon after, Brewer left show business and became a truck driver. Williams carried on in the Singinaires and former groupmate John Carnegie. Ultimately, Williams gave up music all together by the early 1960s.

Brown went about to reform the Checkers before their last studio session in late 1954, this group consisted of Eddie "Monkey Man" Harris (former lead of the Blue Dots on Deluxe), David Martin (2nd tenor, formerly of the Sparrows with Perry Heyward), and James Williams (baritone).

This Checkers line up continued to perform live, but broke up in mid-1955, with their last record being released post-break up in December 1955, recording a total of 25 songs all for King and re-released on Federal. Only one track, "A Friend in Need" from 1953, went unreleased.

== Deaths ==
The book Encyclopedia of Rhythm and Blues and Doo-Wop Vocal Groups by Mitch Rosalsky, says that Bill Brown died In 1956 and another source says Bill Brown died In 1958 (also according to R&B historian Marv Goldberg, Bill Brown died before the mid-70s).

David Baughan died On January 1, 1970, from an accidental fall after a night of drinking (according to his daughter).

Irwin Richard "Teddy" Williams died on October 17, 1970.

John Carnegie died in May 1979.

James Turner "Buddy" Brewer died on November 1, 2000.

Charlie White allegedly died in 2005.

Perry Heyward died on July 3, 2010.

The whereabouts of later members Eddie Harris, David Martin, and James Williams are unknown.
