= The Ravens =

American R&B vocal group

- Genres: R&B, doo-wop
- Years active: 1946–1958 (Reunions: 1971, 1974, 1983, 1987)
- Labels: Hub, National, King, Columbia, OKeh, Mercury, Jubilee
- Past members: Jimmy "Ricky" Ricks; Warren "Birdland" Suttles; Leonard "Zeke" Puzey; Ollie Jones; Maithe Marshall; Joe Medlin; Richie Cannon; Louis Heyward; Joe Van Loan; Louis Frazier; Jimmie Steward; Tommy Evans; Willie Ray; Willis Sanders; Bob Kornegay; David "Boots" Bowers; Paul Van Loan; James Van Loan; Aaron "Tex" Cornelius; Grant Kitchings

The Ravens were an American R&B vocal group, formed in 1946 by Jimmy Ricks and Warren Suttles. They were one of the most successful and most influential vocal quartets of the period, and had several hits on the R&B chart in the late 1940s and early 1950s.

== Career ==
Jimmy "Ricky" Ricks was born in Adrian, Georgia. His mother was 14 when he was born. She went to Florida to find a better job. Jimmy lived with his aunt and uncle, Marnie and Luther Ricks until he was 13 and moved to Jacksonville, Florida to be with his mother. During World War II, Jimmy moved to New York City, where he worked as a waiter in Harlem and met Warren "Birdland" Suttles from Fairfield, Alabama which is southwest of Birmingham, Alabama. In early 1946, they decided to form a vocal group and recruited Leonard "Zeke" Puzey, who had recently won a talent contest at the Apollo Theater, and Ollie Jones. They found a manager, Ben Bart, and an accompanist, Howard Biggs and made their first recordings for Bart's small Hub record label. They called themselves the Ravens thus initiating a trend for vocal groups to name themselves after birds—groups who later followed included the Orioles, the Crows, the Larks, the Robins and the Penguins.

Although the group was strongly influenced by the Ink Spots, the Delta Rhythm Boys, and the Mills Brothers, they used Jimmy Ricks' bass voice, rather than a more conventional tenor, as the lead on many of their recordings. It became their trademark style. Their material was also more varied, including elements of pop, jazz, R&B, and gospel styles.

After their initial single, "Honey", Jones left the group and was replaced by Maithe Marshall. The contrast between Ricks' bass voice and Marshall's tenor became integral to their success. In 1947 the Ravens left the Hub label to join National Records, and had immediate hits on what was called at the time the "race records" chart with a version of "Ol' Man River" (from the musical Show Boat) and "Write Me A Letter", which rose to no. 5 on the "race" chart in 1948 and crossed over to the pop chart. Their run of successes on what came to be known as the R&B chart continued through to early 1950, with the basic line-up of Ricks, Suttles, Puzey, and Marshall essentially remaining together for several years. Their version of "Count Every Star" (1950) was later used in the film Revolutionary Road.

The Ravens primarily existed to showcase bass singer Ricks; they were very successful and Ricks' voice became the standard against which every rhythm and blues bass was measured for the next generation. Although the group had relatively few chart hits, they were popular in concert, commanding a fee of $2,000 a night. The group recorded for Columbia Records and its subsidiary OKeh in 1950, before moving to the Mercury label. In 1951 Marshall and Puzey both left; Joe Van Loan became a long-term replacement for Marshall as lead tenor, and there were various other shorter-term group members. The group had its final hit on the R&B chart in late 1952, when "Rock Me All Night Long" rose to no. 4, the highest position the group reached in their career.

In 1953 they moved to the Jubilee label, but with the rise of rock and roll their style became increasingly unfashionable. After several earlier breaks from the group, Suttles left for the final time in 1954. Ricks left for a solo career in 1956. After his departure, the group was led by Joe Van Loan, who at one point brought his brothers Paul and James into the group; however, the group finally disbanded in 1958.

Ricks recorded as a solo singer without notable success for a number of labels, including Atlantic where he also recorded with LaVern Baker and Little Esther. In 1971, he and Suttles temporarily revived the Ravens, with additional members Gregory Carroll and Jimmy Breedlove. At the time of his death from a heart attack, at the age of 49 in 1974, he was the vocalist for the Count Basie orchestra. Suttles, Puzey and Marshall also appeared together, with Evans, as the Ravens in 1974. Another reunion was held by the United in Group Harmony Association (UGHA) in 1987. The reunion again featured Suttles, Puzey, and Marshall as well as Jones. As both Ricks and Evans had died (in 1974 and 1984), the lead on "Without A Song" was sung by Suttles.

The Ravens were inducted into The Vocal Group Hall of Fame in 1998. In 2006, Suttles accepted the Harlem Jazz & Music Festival 2006 Rhythm & Blues award on the group's behalf.

== Group members ==
=== Original members ===
- Jimmy "Ricky" Ricks (James Thomas Ricks, August 6, 1924 – July 2, 1974) (member 1946–1956, 1971)
- Warren "Birdland" Suttles (February 20, 1925 – July 24, 2009) (1946–1948, 1949–1950, 1952–1954, 1971, 1974, 1983, 1987)
- Leonard "Zeke" Puzey (August 20, 1926 – October 2, 2007) (1946–1951, 1953, 1974, 1987)
- Henry Oliver "Ollie" Jones (December 9, 1923 – October 4, 1990) (1946–1947, 1983, 1987)

=== Later members ===
- Maithe Marshall (Maithe Williams) (August 31, 1924 – November 1, 1989)
  (1947–1951, 1974, 1987)
- Joe Medlin (1948)
- Richie Cannon (1948–1949)
- Louis Heyward (1950–1951)
- Austin Cromer (dates unknown)
- Joe Van Loan (December 6, 1926–1976)
  (1951–1958)
- Louis Frazier (1951–1952, 1954–1956)
- Jimmie Steward (1951–1956)
- Tommy Evans (January 9, 1927 – September 1984) (1954, 1956, 1974)
- Willie Ray (1956–1957)
- Willis Sanders (1956–1957)
- Bob Kornegay (1956)
- David "Boots" Bowers (January 23, 1928 – October 23, 1995) (1956–1958)
- Paul Van Loan (January 19, 1931 – January 1978) (1957)
- James Van Loan (July 5, 1926 – March 27, 1960) (1957)
- Aaron "Tex" Cornelius (1958)
- Grant Kitchings (1958)

=== Piano ===
- Howard Biggs (1946–1949)
- Bill Sanford (1949–1957)
- Bill Chambers (1957–1958)

== Discography ==
=== Singles ===
List of singles, with selected chart positions
Year	Song	US R&B
1948	"Be on Your Merry Way"	13
1948	"Bye Bye Baby Blues"	8
1948	"It's Too Soon to Know"	11
1948	"Ol' Man River"	10
1948	"Send for Me If You Need Me"	5
1948	"Silent Night"	8
1948	"Write Me a Letter"	5
1949	"Ricky's Blues"	8
1949	"White Christmas"	9
1950	"I Don't Have to Ride No More"	9
1951	"Honey I Don't Want You"	–
1952	"Rock Me All Night Long"	4
