= Billy Ward and his Dominoes =

American R&B vocal group

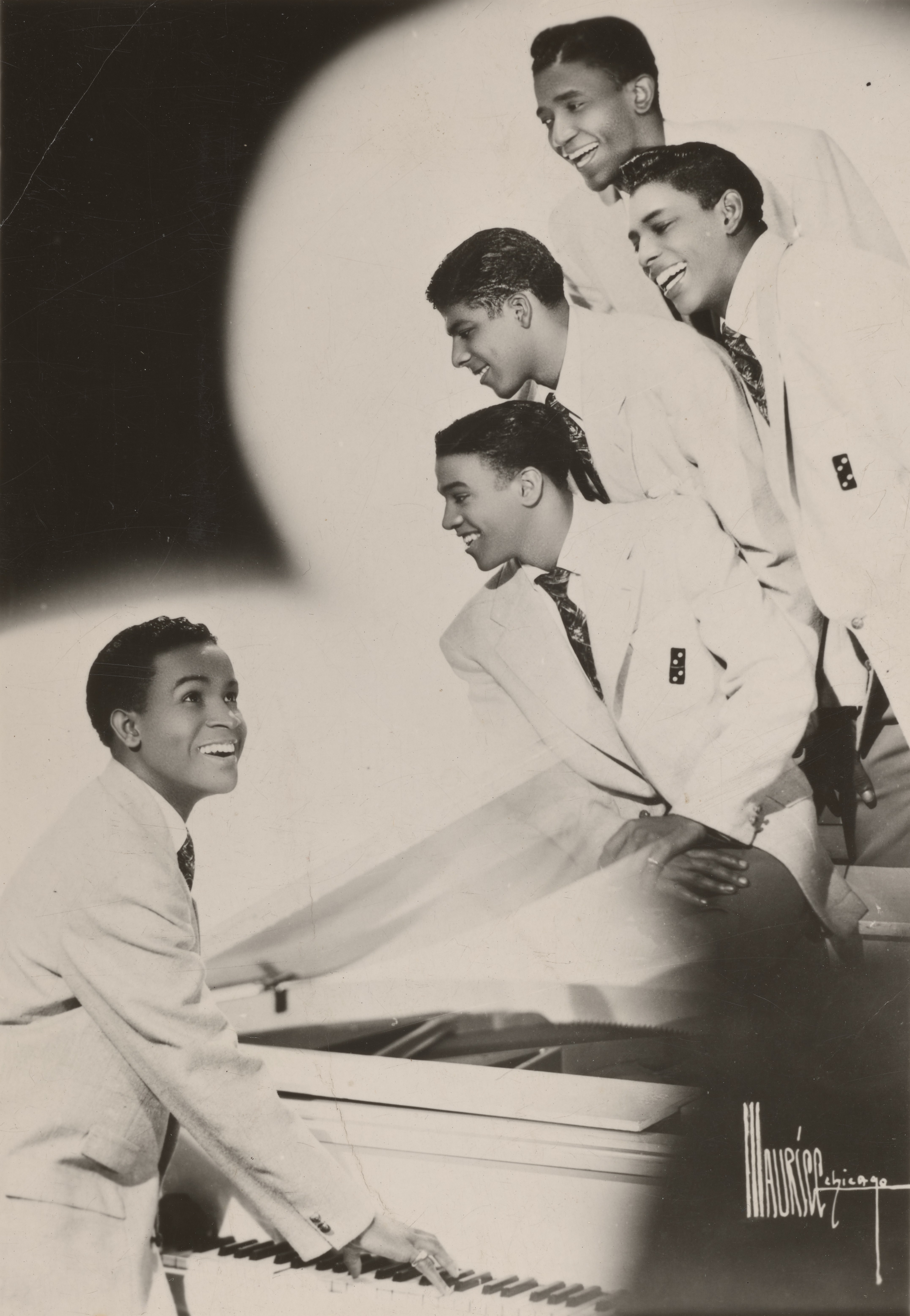
- The Dominoes in 1952 (Top to Bottom): Joe Lamont, David McNeil, James Van Loan, and Clyde McPhatter. (Standing at Piano): Billy Ward.

Background information
- Also known as: The Dominoes
- Genres: Doo-wop; rhythm and blues
- Years active: 1950–1965
- Labels: Federal, Jubilee, London, Decca
- Past members: Billy Ward; Clyde McPhatter; Charlie White; Joe Lamont; Bill Brown; James Van Loan; David McNeil; Jackie Wilson; Eugene Mumford; Milton Merle (Milton Murrill); Cliff Givens; Milton Grayson: Robbie Robinson; Monroe Powell; Phil "Shoulders" Colbert; Eddie Herring; Prentice Moreland; Bruce Cloud; Al Anderson; Lou Ragland; Carl "Fess" Thompson

Billy Ward and his Dominoes were an American R&B vocal group. One of the most successful R&B groups of the early 1950s, the Dominoes helped launch the singing careers of two notable members, Clyde McPhatter and Jackie Wilson.

== Origins ==
Billy Ward (born Robert L. Williams, September 19, 1921, Savannah, Georgia, died February 16, 2002, Inglewood, California) grew up in Philadelphia, the second of three sons of Charles Williams and Cora Bates Williams, and was a child musical prodigy, winning an award for a piano composition at the age of 14. Following military service with the Coast Guard Artillery Choir, he studied music in Chicago, and at the Juilliard School of Music in New York, a rare achievement for Black musicians at the time. While working as a vocal coach and part-time arranger on Broadway, he met talent agent Rose Marks, who became his business and songwriting partner.

== Career ==
=== Formation of group ===
The pair set out to form a vocal group from the ranks of his students, hoping to cash in on the new trend of vocal groups in R&B. The group was at first called the Ques, composed of Clyde McPhatter (lead tenor), whom Ward recruited after McPhatter won "Amateur Night" at the Apollo Theater, Charlie White (tenor), Joe Lamont (baritone), and Bill Brown (bass). Ward acted as their pianist and arranger. After the group made successful appearances on talent shows in the Apollo Theater and on the Arthur Godfrey show in 1950, Rene Hall recommended them to Ralph Bass of Federal Records, a subsidiary of King, where they were signed to a recording contract and renamed themselves the Dominoes.

=== Initial success ===
Their first single release, "Do Something For Me", with McPhatter's lead vocal, reached the R&B charts in early 1951, climbing to number 6. After a less successful follow-up, the group released "Sixty Minute Man", on which Brown sang lead, and boasted of being able to satisfy his girls with fifteen minutes each of "kissin'" "teasin'" and "squeezin'", before "blowin'" his "top". It reached number 1 on the R&B chart in May 1951 and stayed there for 14 weeks, and crossed over to the pop charts, reaching number 17 and voted "Song of the Year" of 1951. It was an important record in several respects—it crossed the boundaries between gospel singing and blues, its lyrics pushed the limits of what was deemed acceptable, and it appealed to many white as well as black listeners. In later years, it became a contender for the title of "first rock 'n' roll record".

One source summarized the song's appeal: it "contains "rebelliousness, unsubtle sexuality, and a steady rhythm. It arguably coined the very name of this new type of music: rock and roll". Its success on the pop charts indicated that R&B cross over was certainly possible. The recording "opened the door for other sexually forthright records, planting the seed for songs like Hank Ballard's "Work with me Annie", Etta James' "Roll with Me Henry" and other future hits".

The group toured widely, building up a reputation as one of the top R&B acts of the era, edging out the Five Keys and the Clovers (two of the top R&B groups of the early 1950s) and commanding audiences which crossed racial divides. However, Ward's strict disciplinarian approach, and failure to recompense the singers, caused internal problems. Ward is remembered as a petty tyrant who levied fines against group members for infractions, including arriving late for rehearsals and wearing un-shined shoes on stage. Jackie Wilson recalled, "Billy Ward was not an easy man to work for. He played piano and organ, could arrange, and he was a fine director and coach. He knew what he wanted, and you had to give it to him. And he was a strict disciplinarian. You better believe it! You paid a fine if you stepped out of line." Ward most likely got the idea of levying fines against group members from his tenure in the military. Article 15 of the Uniform Code of Military Justice gives a unit commander authority to mete a certain amount of punishment to troops under his or her command without going through a court-martial, which includes fines (partial forfeiture of pay).

The name "The Dominoes" was owned by Ward and Marks, who had the power to hire and fire and paid the singers a salary rather than a share. Clyde McPhatter was being paid barely enough to live on, even though most of the Dominoes' success was due to McPhatter's soaring vocal abilities. "Whenever I'd get back on the block where everybody'd heard my records—half the time I couldn't afford a Coca-Cola," according to McPhatter. Allegedly, Ward paid his singers $100 a week (US$1,175 in 2024 dollars), minus deductions for taxes, food and hotel bills. McPhatter often found himself billed as "Clyde Ward" to fool fans into thinking he was Billy Ward's little brother. Others assumed Ward was doing the lead singing.

=== Personnel changes ===
White and Brown both left in 1951 to form the Checkers and were replaced by James Van Loan (1927–1960) and David McNeil (1932–2005, previously of the Larks). In March 1952, the Dominoes were chosen to be the only vocal group at Alan Freed's "Moondog Coronation Ball". The hits continued, with "Have Mercy Baby" topping the R&B charts for 10 weeks in 1952. Later records were credited to "Billy Ward and His Dominoes".

In early 1953, after nine hits, McPhatter left to form his own group, the Drifters. His replacement in the Dominoes was Jackie Wilson, who had been coached by McPhatter while also singing with the group on tour. Lamont and McNeil also left and were replaced by Milton Merle and Cliff Givens (Givens had been in the Southern Sons Gospel Quartet; he joined the Ink Spots in 1944 upon the death of original bass Orville "Hoppy" Jones). With Wilson singing lead, singles such as "You Can't Keep a Good Man Down" continued to be successful, although the Dominoes did not enjoy quite the same success as they had with McPhatter as lead tenor.

In 1954, Ward moved the group to Jubilee Records and then to Decca Records, where they had a number 27 pop hit, "St. Therese of the Roses", featuring Wilson on tenor, giving the Dominoes a brief moment in the spotlight again. However, the group was unable to follow that success on the charts, and there was a succession of personnel changes. They increasingly moved away from their R&B roots with appearances in Las Vegas and elsewhere. Elvis Presley went to hear Jackie Wilson and the Dominoes in Las Vegas in 1956 and was so impressed with Wilson's singing that he went back to Sun Studios and cut the Million Dollar Quartet's version of "Don't Be Cruel". Presley introduced the song by saying how Wilson sang it much better and then proceeded to do an impersonation of the much slower Dominoes version, backed by Johnny Cash, Carl Perkins and Jerry Lee Lewis.

In 1957, Wilson left for a solo career and was replaced by Gene Mumford of the Larks, after which the group signed a contract with Liberty Records. They had a number 13 pop hit with "Stardust". "Stardust" was one of the earliest multitrack recordings in the rock and roll era, having been recorded on March 7, 1957. The tapes were mixed into true stereo, making the recording one of the first songs by a rock and roll/R&B artist in this format. The track reached number 13 in the UK Singles Chart in October 1957. It was to be their only million seller. It was followed by "Deep Purple". This proved to be their last major success, although various lineups of the group continued recording and performing into the 1960s.

They were inducted into the Vocal Group Hall of Fame in 2006.

== Deaths ==
- James Van Loan on March 27, 1960, from heart disease.
- Bruce Cloud in March 1971, asphyxiated himself in his car, after killing his estranged wife and two-year-old son.
- Clyde McPhatter on June 13, 1972.
- Eddie Herring and his wife on February 3, 1973, murdered in their home.
- Gene Mumford on May 10, 1977, from bacterial pneumonia, alcoholism and diabetes.
- Jackie Wilson on January 21, 1984, from complications of pneumonia.
- Prentice Moreland in September 1988.
- Cliff Givens on June 6, 1989.
- William "Joe" Lamont on August 2, 1991.
- David McNeil on January 7, 2005, from cancer.
- Milton Grayson on September 3, 2005.
- Milton Murrill on January 24, 2012.
- Lou Ragland on August 19, 2020

== Discography ==
=== Singles ===
Year	Single (A-side, B-side) Both sides from same album except where indicated	Chart Positions			Album
Year	Single (A-side, B-side) Both sides from same album except where indicated	US Pop	US R&B	UK	Album
1951	"Harbor Lights" b/w "'No!' Says My Heart" (from 18 Hits Volume Two)	-	-	-	Billy Ward & His Dominoes Featuring Clyde McPhatter
1951	"Do Something For Me" b/w "Chicken Blues"	-	6	-	Clyde McPhatter With Billy Ward & His Dominoes
1951	"Sixty Minute Man" b/w "I Can't Escape From You" (from 18 Hits Volume Two)	17	1	-	Clyde McPhatter With Billy Ward & His Dominoes
1951	"I Am With You" b/w "Weeping Willow Blues"	-	8	-	Clyde McPhatter With Billy Ward & His Dominoes
1952	"That's What You're Doing To Me"; Original B-side: "When The Swallows Come Back To Capistrano" (from ...Featuring Clyde McPhatter); Later B-side:"Love Love Love"	-	7	-	Clyde McPhatter With Billy Ward & His Dominoes
1952	"Have Mercy Baby" b/w "Deep Sea Blues"	-	1	-	Clyde McPhatter With Billy Ward & His Dominoes
1952	"I'd Be Satisfied" b/w "No Room" (from 18 Hits Volume Two)	-	4	-	All Their Hits (1951–1965), Volume One
1952	"Yours Forever" b/w "I'm Lonely"	-	-	-	18 Hits Volume Two
1953	"The Bells" /	-	3	-	Clyde McPhatter With Billy Ward & His Dominoes
1953	"Pedal Pushin' Papa"	-	4	-	Clyde McPhatter With Billy Ward & His Dominoes
1953	"These Foolish Things (Remind Me of You)" /	-	2(1)	-	Billy Ward & His Dominoes Featuring Clyde McPhatter
1953	"Don't Leave Me This Way"	-	15	-	Clyde McPhatter With Billy Ward & His Dominoes
1953	"You Can't Keep A Good Man Down" b/w "Where Now Little Heart" (from 21 Hits Volume Four)	-	8	-	14 Hits Volume Three
1953	"Rags to Riches" b/w "Don't Thank Me" (from 21 Hits Volume Four)	-	2(1)	-	All Their Hits (1951–1965), Volume One
1953	"Christmas In Heaven" b/w "Ringing In A Brand New Year" (from All Their Hits (1951–1965), Volume One)	-	19	-	14 Hits Volume Three
1954	"Until The Real Thing Comes Along" b/w "My Baby's 3-D" (from 21 Hits Volume Four)	-	-	-	Billy Ward & His Dominoes Featuring Jackie Wilson
1954	"Tootsie Roll" b/w "I'm Gonna Move To The Outskirts Of Town" (from 14 Hits Volume Three)	-	-	-	21 Hits Volume Four
1954	"Handwriting On The Wall" b/w "One Moment With You" (from 14 Hits Volume Three)	-	-	-	21 Hits Volume Four
1954	"Above Jacob's Ladder" b/w "Little Black Train" (from 21 Hits Volume Four)	-	-	-	14 Hits Volume Three
1954	"Gimme Gimme Gimme" b/w "Come To Me Baby"	-	-	-	Non-album tracks
1954	"A Little Lie" b/w "Tenderly" (from Billy Ward & His Dominoes Featuring Clyde McPhatter)	-	-	-	14 Hits Volume Three
1955	"Sweethearts On Parade" b/w "Take Me Back To Heaven"	-	-	-	Non-album tracks
1955	"Can't Do Sixty No More" b/w "If I Never Get To Heaven" (from 21 Hits Volume Four)	-	-	-	All Their Hits (1951–1965), Volume One
1955	"Love Me Now Or Let Me Go" b/w "Cave Man" (from 21 Hits Volume Four)	-	-	-	14 Hits Volume Three
1955	"Three Coins In The Fountain" b/w "Lonesome Road"	-	-	-	Billy Ward & His Dominoes Featuring Clyde McPhatter
1955	"Learnin' The Blues" b/w "May I Never Love Again"	-	-	-	Billy Ward & His Dominoes Featuring Clyde McPhatter
1956	"St. Therese Of The Roses" b/w "Home Is Where You Hang Your Heart" (Non-album track)	27	-	-	Billy Ward and The Dominoes
1956	"Will You Remember" b/w "Come On, Snake, Let's Crawl" (Non-album track)	-	-	-	Billy Ward and The Dominoes
1956	"Half A Love (Is Better Than None)" b/w "Evermore" (from Billy Ward and The Dominoes)	-	-	-	Non-album track
1956	"Bobby Sox Baby" b/w "How Long, How Long Blues" (from 21 Hits Volume Four)	-	-	-	14 Hits Volume Three
1957	"Rock, Plymouth Rock" b/w "'Til Kingdom Come" (from Billy Ward and The Dominoes)	-	-	-	Non-album track
1957	"Stardust" b/w "Lucinda"	12	2(1)	13	Yours Forever
1957	"One Moment With You" b/w "St. Louis Blues" (from Billy Ward and The Dominoes)	-	-	-	14 Hits Volume Three
1957	"To Each His Own" b/w "I Don't Stand A Ghost Of A Chance With You"	-	-	-	Billy Ward and The Dominoes
1957	"When The Saints Go Marching In" b/w "September Song"	-	-	-	Billy Ward and The Dominoes
1957	"Deep Purple" b/w "Do It Again"	18	-	-	Yours Forever
1957	"My Proudest Possession" b/w "Someone Greater Than I" (from Sea Of Glass)	-	-	-	Non-album tracks
1958	"Solitude" b/w "(You Grow) Sweeter As The Years Go By"	-	-	-	Non-album tracks
1958	"Jennie Lee" b/w "Music, Maestro, Please!" (from Yours Forever)	55	14	-	Non-album tracks
1959	"Please Don't Say No" b/w "Behave, Hula Girl"	-	-	-	Non-album tracks
1959	"I'm Walking Behind You" b/w "This Love Of Mine"	-	-	-	21 Hits Volume Four
1960	"You're Mine" b/w "The World Is Waiting For The Sunshine"	-	-	-	Non-album tracks
1960	"The Gypsy" b/w "You"	-	-	-	Non-album tracks
1960	"Lay It On The Line" b/w "That's How You Know You're Growing Old"	-	-	-	21 Hits Volume Four
1962	"Man In The Stained Glass Window" b/w "My Fair Weather Friend"	-	-	-	Non-album tracks
1965	"O Holy Night" b/w "What Are You Doing New Year's Eve"	-	-	-	All Their Hits (1951–1965), Volume One
