= RPM Records (United States) =

American blues record label (1950–1957)

- Founded: 1950
- Country of origin: United States
- Location: Los Angeles

RPM Records was an American Los Angeles–based record label launched in 1950. This is not the same RPM used by Tony Bennett, nor is it related to labels in the UK and South Africa.

RPM was a subsidiary of Modern Records and part of the Bihari Brothers record empire.

Ike Turner, who was a talent scout for the Bihari Brothers, arranged for many blues musicians such as Howlin' Wolf, B.B. King, and Roscoe Gordon to record for the Biharis. King released many successful singles on the RPM label. Paul Anka released his first single on RPM in 1956.

In 1957, the Bihari Brothers announced that they were halting all album releases on both Modern and RPM, and that their released and scheduled albums for Modern and RPM would be issued on their Crown Records label.

The catalogs and master tapes were sold to Ace Records (UK) in the 1990s.

Currently, Ace Records of the U.K and P-VINE hold the rights to RPM Records

== Selected discography ==
Catalog No.	Release date	US	US R&B	Single (A-side, B-side)	Artist
324	Jun 1951		9	"Saddled the Cow (and Milked the Horse)" b/w "Ouch! Pretty Baby"	Roscoe Gordon
325	Jun 1951		1	"T-99 Blues" b/w "Rain Drop Blues"	Jimmie Nelson and The Peter Rabbit Trio
333	Sep 1951			"Riding in the Moonlight" b/w "Morning at Midnight"	Howlin' Wolf
339	Dec 1951		1	"3 O'Clock Blues" b/w "That Ain't the Way to Do It"	B.B. King
350	Mar 1952		2	"No More Doggin'" b/w "Maria"	Roscoe Gordon
355	1952			"Shake It Up And Go" b/w " My Own Fault, Darlin'"	B.B. King and His Orchestra
356	May 1952			"You're Drivin' Me Insane" b/w "Trouble and Heartaches"	Ike Turner with Ben Burton's Orchestra
363	Sep 1952		1	"You Know I Love You" b/w "You Didn’t Want Me"	B.B. King and His Orchestra
374	Dec 1952		9	"Story from My Heart and Soul" b/w "Boogie Woogie Woman"	B.B. King
386	Jun 1953		1	"Please Love Me" b/w "Highway Bound"	B.B. King and His Orchestra
416	Sep 1954		1	"You Upset Me Baby" b/w "Whole Lotta Love"	B.B. "Blues Boy" King and His Orchestra
421	Jan 1955		8	"Every Day I Have The Blues"	B.B. "Blues Boy" King and His Orchestra
421	Jan 1955		14	"Sneakin' Around"	B.B. "Blues Boy" King and "The Kings Men"
436	Aug 1955		10	"Those Lonely, Lonely Nights" b/w "Someone Cares For Me"	Johnny "Guitar" Watson
453	Jan 1956	14	2	"Eddie My Love" b/w "Just Goofed"	The Teen Queens
472	Sep 1956			"I Confess" b/w "Blau-Wile-Deveest-Fontaine"	Paul Anka
494	Jun 1957			"Quit My Baby"	B.B. "Blues Boy" King and His Orchestra
494	Jun 1957	95		"Be Careful With A Fool"	B.B. "Blues Boy" King and His Orchestra
501	Nov 1957			"The Key to My Kingdom" b/w "My Heart Belongs to Only You"	B.B. King and His Orchestra

== See also ==
- List of record labels
- RPM Records artists
