= Ike & Tina Turner discography =

Cataloging of published recordings by Ike & Tina Turner

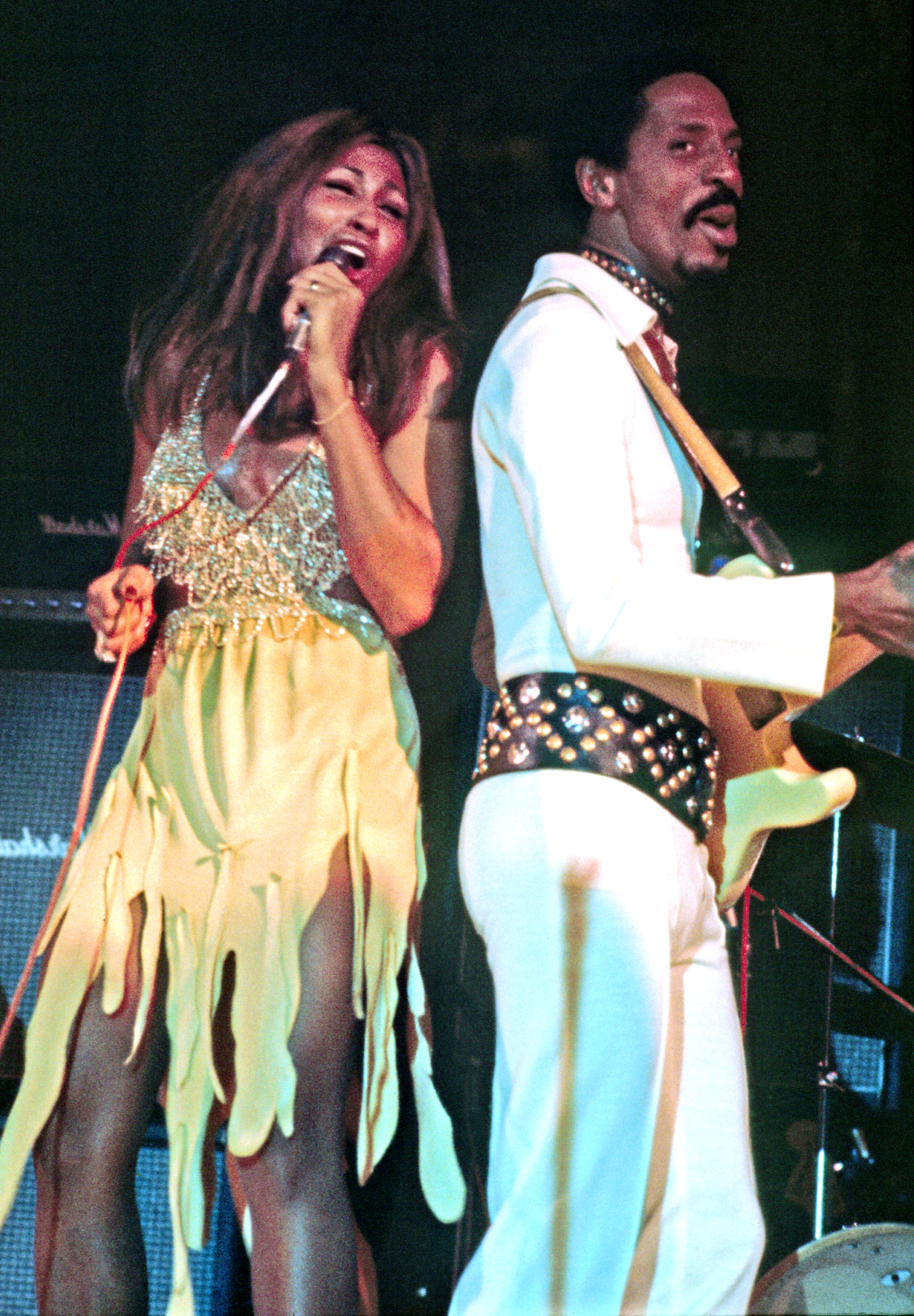
- Ike & Tina Turner performing in Hamburg, Germany in 1972
- Studio albums: 22 (includes 2 reissues)
- Soundtrack albums: 2
- Live albums: 8
- Compilation albums: 31+
- Singles: 70

This article contains information about albums and singles released by the American musical duo Ike & Tina Turner.

== Overview ==
Tina Turner joined musician and songwriter Ike Turner's band the Kings of Rhythm as a vocalist in 1956. They released their first record together in 1958. Under the name "Little Ann", Tina Turner was featured alongside Ike Turner and fellow Kings of Rhythm vocalist Carlson Oliver on the single "Boxtop".

In 1960, Ike Turner formed the Ike & Tina Turner Revue. Their debut single "A Fool in Love" was released on Sue Records in July 1960. The success of the single was followed by a string of R&B hits within a 2-year span, including "I Idolize You", "It's Gonna Work Out Fine", and "Poor Fool". Between 1960 and 1975, the duo had 20 songs on the Billboard Hot 100 chart which include 1 top 10 hit, and 26 songs on the Billboard Hot R&B chart which include 6 top 10 hits. They also had 12 albums on both the Billboard 200 and Top R&B Albums charts. Ike & Tina Turner had 9 singles chart in the UK, their first was "River Deep – Mountain High" in 1966 and their last being "Baby, Get It On" in 1975. A few years after their dissolution, Ike Turner released "Party Vibes"/"Shame, Shame, Shame" taken from their last recording sessions. The single charted on Billboard's Disco Top 100 in 1980.

Their best-selling single "Proud Mary" and their best-selling album What You Hear Is What You Get, both released in 1971, are certified Gold by the RIAA. Their single "Nutbush City Limits" was certified silver by the BPI in 1973. In 1974, they received the first ever Golden European Award for selling more than one million records of "Nutbush City Limits" in Europe. In 1977, Tina Turner was presented an Australian Platinum Award for the album Nutbush City Limits.

In 2003, Rolling Stone ranked the compilation album Proud Mary: The Best of Ike & Tina Turner No. 212 on their list of the 500 greatest albums of all time (No. 214 on 2012 revised list). In 2017, Pitchfork ranked the album River Deep – Mountain High No. 40 on their list of the 200 Best Albums of the 1960s.

=== Labels ===
After three years with their first label Sue Records, Ike & Tina Turner began recording on Ike Turner's Sonja label in 1963. While releasing singles, the duo also toured extensively. To make sure he always had a record out while on tour, Turner formed various labels to release singles such as Teena, Prann, Innis, Sony and Sonja Records. Between 1964 and 1969, the duo signed with multiple labels, including Warner Bros., Loma, Modern, Kent, Cenco, Philles, Tangerine, Pompeii, Blue Thumb, Minit and A&M. After the success of their single "Come Together", the duo were reassigned to Minit's parent label Liberty Records in 1970. In 1971, Liberty was absorbed into United Artists Records, where Ike & Tina Turner remained for the rest of their tenure together.

== Albums ==
=== Studio albums ===
Title	Album details	Peak chart positions							Notes
Title	Album details	US	US R&B	AUS	AUT	CAN	GER	UK	Notes
The Soul of Ike & Tina Turner	Released: February 1961; Label: Sue; Catalog number: LP 2001	—	N/A	—	—	—	—	—	
Ike & Tina Turner's Kings of Rhythm Dance	Released: March 1962; Label: Sue; Catalog number: LP 2003	—	N/A	—	—	—	—	—	Ike & Tina Turner appear on the cover but this is an instrumental LP by the Kings of Rhythm
Dynamite!	Released: May 1962; Label: Sue; Catalog number: LP 2004	—	N/A	—	—	—	—	—	
Don't Play Me Cheap	Released: February 1963; Label: Sue; Catalog number: LP 2005	—	N/A	—	—	—	—	—	
It's Gonna Work Out Fine	Released: June 1963; Label: Sue; Catalog number: LP 2007	—	N/A	—	—	—	—	—	
Get It – Get It	Released: circa 1966; Label: Cenco; Catalog number: LP 104	—	—	—	—	—	—	—	
River Deep – Mountain High	Released: September 1966; Label: London; Catalog number: HAU 8298/SHU 8298	—	—	—	—	—	—	27	This was only released in the UK. It was intended to be released in the US by Philles Records as PHLP-4011. (Note: Only a few copies of LP-4011 were pressed, and covers never printed before it was canceled by Philles. By popular demand, Phil Spector released the album in the United Kingdom with liner notes written by Decca's promotion man, Tony Hall. Hall included a quote from Spector stating, "We can only assume that England is more appreciative of talent and exciting music than the U.S."); Reissued with a different track listing on A&M Records in 1969; Ranked No. 40 on Pitchforks list of the 200 Best Albums of the 1960s
So Fine	Released: July 1968; Label: Pompeii; Catalog number: Pompeii SD 6000	—	—	—	—	—	—	—	Reissued as Too Hot to Hold in 1974
Outta Season	Released: March 1969; Label: Blue Thumb; Catalog number: Blue Thumb BTS5	91	43	—	—	—	—	—	
Cussin', Cryin' & Carryin' On	Released: July 1969; Label: Pompeii; Catalog number: SD 6004	—	—	—	—	—	—	—	Contains mostly previously released songs, some songs from the Ikettes and instrumental tracks
River Deep – Mountain High	Released: September 1969; Label: A&M; Catalog number: SP-4178/SP-3179	102	28	29	—	—	—	—	Revised reissue of 1966 album; Substitutes "You're So Fine" with "I'll Never Need More Than This"
The Hunter	Released: October 1969; Label: Blue Thumb; Catalog number: BTS11	176	49	—	—	—	—	—	Grammy Award nomination for Best R&B Vocal Performance, Female: Tina Turner
Come Together	Released: April 1970; Label: Liberty; Catalog number: LST-7637	130	13	—	—	—	—	—	Credited to Ike & Tina Turner and The Ikettes; Orchestra version of "Come Together" single was included on the soundtrack album All This and World War II in 1976
Workin' Together	Released: November 1970; Label: Liberty; Catalog number: LST-7650	25	3	—	—	52	12	—	Includes Grammy Award-winning single "Proud Mary"
Her Man. . . His Woman	Released: February 1971; Label: Capitol; Catalog number: ST 571	201*	—	—	—	—	—	—	Revised reissue of Get It – Get It
'Nuff Said	Released: November 1971; Label: United Artists; Catalog number: UAS 5530	108	21	—	—	—	—	—	
Feel Good	Released: July 1972; Label: United Artists; Catalog number: UAS 5598	160	28 (Note: Billboard discontinued its Top Soul LP's chart from August 26 to October 7, 1972.)	—	—	—	—	—	
Let Me Touch Your Mind	Released: January 1973; Label: United Artists; Catalog number: UAS 5660	205*	—	—	—	—	—	—	
Nutbush City Limits	Released: November 1973; Label: United Artists; Catalog number: UA LA180-F	163	21	13	4	—	21	—	
The Gospel According to Ike & Tina	Released: April 1974; Label: United Artists; Catalog number: UA LA203-G	—	—	—	—	—	—	—	Grammy Award nominated for Best Soul Gospel Performance; Includes Grammy Award nominated single "Father Alone" by Ike Turner
Sweet Rhode Island Red	Released: October 1974; Label: United Artists; Catalog number: UA LA312-G	—	—	41	—	—	—	—	Created exclusively for the international market
Delilah's Power	Released:April 20th 1977; Label: United Artists; Catalog number: UA-LA707-G	—	—	—	—	—	—	—	
The Edge	Released: 1980; Label: Fantasy; Catalog number: F-9597	—	—	—	—	—	—	—	Ike Turner album; features the last Ike & Tina recordings
*album did not chart on the main chart but was on Bubbling Under The Top LP's. "—" denotes a recording that did not chart or was not released in that country. N/A indicates Billboard R&B albums chart wasn't introduced until January 1965.

=== Live albums ===
Title	Album details	Peak chart positions					Notes
Title	Album details	US	US R&B	AUS	CAN	GER	Notes
Ike & Tina Turner Revue Live	Released: November 1964; Label: Kent; Catalog Number: KLMP 5014	—	N/A	—	—	—	Recorded at the Club Imperial and Harlem Club in St. Louis; Reissued as Please, Please, Please
Live! The Ike & Tina Turner Show	Released: January 1965; Label: Warner Bros.; Catalog Number: W 1579	126	8	—	—	—	Recorded at the Skyliner Ballroom (Fort Worth, Texas) and the Lovall's Ballroom (Dallas, Texas) in 1964; Reissued in 1970 as On Stage by Valiant Records in the UK; Reissued in 1971 as Something's Got a Hold on Me by Harmony Records with three tracks deleted
The Ike & Tina Turner Show – Vol. 2	Released: January 1967; Label: Loma; Catalog number: LS 5904	—	—	—	—	—	Recorded at the Skyliner Ballroom (Fort Worth, Texas) and the Lovall's Ballroom (Dallas, Texas) in 1964; Reissued in 1969 as Ooh Poo Pah Doo by Harmony Records
In Person	Released: June 1969; Label: Minit; Catalog number: LP 24018	142	19	—	—	—	Credited to Ike & Tina Turner and The Ikettes; Recorded at Basin Street West in San Francisco
Festival of Live Performances	Released: February 1970; Label: Kent; Catalog number: KST538	—	—	—	—	—	Recorded circa 1964–1965
Live In Paris	Released: 1971; Label: Liberty; Catalog number: LBS 83468/69X	—	—	—	—	25	Only released in Europe; Recorded at the Olympia Theater in Paris on January 30, 1971
What You Hear Is What You Get – Live at Carnegie Hall	Released: July 1971; Label: United Artists; Catalog number: UAS 9953	25	7	38	26	—	Recorded during doubleheader at the Carnegie Hall in New York City on April 1–2, 1971; Certified Gold by the RIAA
Live! The World of Ike & Tina	Released: September 1973; Label: United Artists; Catalog number: UA LA064 G2 0698	211*	47	—	—	—	Nominated for a Grammy Award in the category of Best Album Package
* album did not chart on the main chart but was on Bubbling Under The Top LP's. "—" denotes a recording that did not chart or was not released in that country. N/A indicates Billboard R&B albums chart wasn't created until January 1965.

=== Selected compilations ===
Title	Year	Notes
The Greatest Hits of Ike & Tina Turner	Released: March 1965; Label / Catalog: Sue LP 1038	Ten tracks were reissued as Ike & Tina's Greatest Hits on Unart Records in 1967 and Sunset Records in 1970
The Soul of Ike & Tina	Released: 1966; Label / Catalog: Kent KST 519	Reissued on CD in 1994 with additional tracks
Ike & Tina Turner's Greatest Hits	Released: July 1969; Label / Catalog: Warner Bros. WS 1810	Songs are from the albums Live! The Ike & Tina Turner Show and The Ike & Tina Turner Show – Vol. 2; Reissued on CD in 1999
Ike & Tina Turner Get It Together!	Released: 1969; Label / Catalog: Pompeii SD6006LP	
The Fantastic Ike & Tina Turner	Released: December 1969; Label / Catalog: Sunset Records SUS-5265	
Ike & Tina Turner: Star-Collection	Released: 1972; Label / Catalog: Midi MID 26 002	
Ike & Tina Turner: Star-Collection Vol. 2	Released: 1975; Label / Catalog: Midi MID 26026	Features recordings from Ike & Tina, the Ikettes and some unreleased tracks
Sixteen Great Performances: Ike & Tina Turner	Released: 1975; Label / Catalog: ABC ABTD 4014	
Greatest Hits	Released: March 1976; Label / Catalog: United Artists UA-LA592-G	Peaked at No. 71 in Australia
Airwaves	Released: July 25th 1978; Label: United Artists; Catalog number: UA-LA917-H	Contains previously unreleased material and some alternative versions of older non-album tracks
Gold Collection	Released: 1979; Label / Catalog: Liberty 1C 134 1827583	2 vinyl LP compilation released in Germany
Nice 'n' Rough: The Later Greater Hits of Ike & Tina & The Ikettes	Released: 1984; Label / Catalog: Liberty LBR 2600211	
Get Back	Released: March 1985; Label / Catalog: Liberty LO-51156	Peaked at No. 189 on Billboard 200
Golden Empire	Released: 1985; Label / Catalog: Striped Horse SH 2001	Remastered tracks and unreleased material; Singles released: "Golden Empire" (1985), "Living for the City" (1985), "Shake a Hand" (1986), "Raise Your Hand" was remixed and released in 2005
Golden Classics	Released: 1987; Label / Catalog: Collectables COL-5107	
Great Rhythm & Blues Sessions	Released: 1991; Label / Catalog: Tomato 700712	
Good Old Times	Released: 1991; Label / Catalog: Bell BLR 84 701	Features unreleased songs and alternate versions of original tracks
Those Were the Days	Released: 1991; Label / Catalog: Bell BLR 84 708	Remixed versions of previously released songs
Proud Mary: The Best of Ike & Tina Turner	Released: March 1991; Label / Catalog: EMI CDP-7-95846-2	Ranked No. 214 (previously No. 212) on Rolling Stone's list of the 500 greatest albums of all time
Bold Soul Sister: The Best of the Blue Thumb Recordings	Released: 1997; Label / Catalog: Hip-O HIPD-40051	
Live! The Ike & Tina Turner Show Volume I & II	Released: 2000; Label / Catalog: One Way OW 35168	Reissue of Live! The Ike & Tina Turner Show and The Ike & Tina Turner Show – Vol. 2 on CD
The Kent Years	Released: May 2000; Label / Catalog: Kent CDKEND 182	Unreleased tracks and most songs from the 1965 Kent album The Soul of Ike & Tina
Funkier Than a Mosquito's Tweeter	Released: July 2002; Label / Catalog: Stateside 7243 5 37960 2 0	
His Woman, Her Man: The Ike Turner Diaries	Released: May 2004; Label / Catalog: Funky Delicacies DEL CD 0045	Unreleased tracks and different versions of previously released songs
Nutbush City Limits/Feel Good	Released: 2006; Label / Catalog: Raven RVCD-241	Reissue of Nutbush City Limits and Feel Good on CD
The Hunter and Outta Season	Released: 2006; Label / Catalog: Blue Moon BMCD 4001	Reissue of The Hunter and Outta Season on CD
The Ike & Tina Turner Story: 1960 –1975	Released: 2007; Label: Time Life/EMI Music Special Markets	3 CD compilation that features greatest hits and the entire live album In Person
Come Together/'Nuff Said	Released: 2010; Label / Catalog: BGO BGOCD942	Reissue of Come Together and 'Nuff Said on CD
Workin Together/Let Me Touch Your Mind	Released: 2011; Label / Catalog: BGO BGOCD996	Reissue of Workin Together and Let Me Touch Your Mind on CD
Delilah's Power/Airwaves	Released: 2011; Label / Catalog: BGO BGOCD1002	Reissue of Delilah's Power and Airwaves on CD
Sweet Rhode Island Red/The Gospel According to Ike & Tina Turner	Released: 2012; Label / Catalog: BGO BGOCD1034	Reissue of Sweet Rhode Island Red and The Gospel According to Ike & Tina Turner on CD
The Complete Pompeii Recordings 1968 –1969	Released: 2016; Label / Catalog: Goldenlane CLO0385CD	Digitally remastered 3-CD set containing the albums So Fine (1968), Cussin', Cryin' & Carryin' On (1969), and Ike's solo album A Black Man's Soul (1969)
Dynamite!/Dance	Released: 2018; Label / Catalog: Hoodoo 263600	Reissue of Dynamite! and Dance with Ike & Tina Turner's Kings of Rhythm on CD

== Singles ==
=== 1960s ===
Single (A-side, B-side) Both sides from same album except where indicated	Release date	Label / Catalog	Peak chart positions								Album
Single (A-side, B-side) Both sides from same album except where indicated	Release date	Label / Catalog	US BB	US BB R&B	US CB	US CB R&B	BEL	CAN	NL	UK	Album
"A Fool in Love" b/w "The Way You Love Me"	Jul 1960	Sue – 730	27	2	19	22 (Note: Cash Box discontinued its R&B singles chart after the issue dated March 5, 1960; it was reinstated in the issue dated December 17, 1960.)	—	—	—	—	The Soul of Ike & Tina Turner
"A Fool Too Long" b/w "You're My Baby" (from The Soul of Ike & Tina Turner)	Oct 1960	Sue – 734	—	—	—	—	—	—	—	—	Non-album tracks
"I Idolize You" b/w "Letter from Tina"	Nov 1960	Sue – 735	82	5	49	4	—	—	—	—	The Soul of Ike & Tina Turner
"I'm Jealous" b/w "You're My Baby"	Jan 1961	Sue – 740	117*	—	83	43	—	—	—	—	The Soul of Ike & Tina Turner
"It's Gonna Work Out Fine" b/w "Won't You Forgive Me"	Jun 1961	Sue – 749	14	2	21	2	—	—	—	—	Dynamite!
"Poor Fool" b/w "You Can't Blame Me" (from The Soul of Ike & Tina Turner)	Nov 1961	Sue – 753	38	4	23	5	—	—	—	—	Dynamite!
"Tra La La La La" b/w "Puppy Love" (Non-album track)	Mar 1962	Sue – 757	50	9	55	21	—	—	—	—	Dynamite!
"Prancing" (instr) b/w It's gonna work out fine	Apr 1962	Sue - 760									Dynamite!
"You Should'a Treated Me Right" b/w "Sleepless"	Jun 1962	Sue – 765	89	—	—	21	—	—	—	—	Dynamite!
"Tina's Dilemma" b/w "I Idolize You" (from Dynamite!)	Aug 1962	Sue – 768	—	—	—	—	—	—	—	—	Non-album tracks
"The Argument" b/w "Mind In A Whirl" (from The Greatest Hits of Ike & Tina Turner)	Oct 1962	Sue – 772	—	—	—	—	—	—	—	—	Non-album tracks
"Worried and Hurtin' Inside" b/w "Please Don't Hurt Me"	Dec 1962	Sue – 774	—	—	—	—	—	—	—	—	Non-album tracks
"Wake Up" b/w "Don't Play Me Cheap"	Apr 1963	Sue – 784	—	—	—	—	—	—	—	—	Don't Play Me Cheap
"If I Can't Be First" b/w "I'm Going Back Home" (Non-album track)	Sep 1963	Sonja – 2001	—	—	—	—	—	—	—	—	The Soul of Ike & Tina (compilation)
"You Can't Miss Nothing That You Never Had" b/w "God Gave Me You"	Feb 1964	Sonja – 2005	122*	29 (Note: R&B singles chart was discontinued from November 30, 1963, to January 23, 1965. Billboard uses Cash Box's stat in their place.)	—	29	—	—	—	—	Non-album tracks
"A Fool for a Fool" b/w "No Tears to Cry"	Apr 1964	Warner Bros. – 5433	—	47 (Note: R&B singles chart was discontinued from November 30, 1963, to January 23, 1965. Billboard uses Cash Box's stat in their place.)	—	47	—	—	—	—	Non-album tracks
"It's All Over" b/w "Finger Poppin"	Aug 1964	Warner Bros. – 5461	—	N/A	—	—	—	—	—	—	Non-album tracks
"Strange" b/w "You're a Jive Playboy" (Non-album track)	1964	Sonja – 5002	—	N/A	—	—	—	—	—	—	Get It – Get It
"I Can't Believe What You Say (for Seeing What You Do)" b/w "My Baby Now"	Sep 1964	Kent – 45x402	95	N/A	134*	—	—	—	—	—	Non-album tracks
"Please, Please, Please" b/w "Am I a Fool in Love" (from The Soul of Ike & Tina)	Nov 1964	Kent – K 409X45	—	N/A	—	—	—	—	—	—	Ike & Tina Turner Revue Live
"Ooh Poo Pah Doo" b/w "Merry Christmas Baby"	Dec 1964	Warner Bros. – 5493	—	N/A	—	—	—	—	—	—	Non-album tracks
"He's the One" b/w "Chicken Shack" (from The Soul of Ike & Tina)	Dec 1964	Kent – K 418X45	—	N/A	—	—	—	—	—	—	Non-album tracks
"Tell Her I'm Not Home" b/w "I'm Thru with Love"	Jan 1965	Loma – 2011	108*	33	135*	—	—	—	—	48	Non-album tracks
"Somebody Needs You" b/w "(I'll Do Anything) Just to Be with You" (Non-album track)	May 1965	Loma – 2015	—	—	—	—	—	—	—	—	Non-album tracks
"Good Bye, So Long" b/w "Hurt Is All You Gave Me"	May 1965	Modern – 45x1007	107*	32	120*	31	—	—	—	—	The Soul of Ike & Tina (compilation)
"I Don't Need" b/w "Gonna Have Fun"	Aug 1965	Modern – 45x1012	134*	—	—	—	—	—	—	—	The Soul of Ike & Tina (compilation)
"Two Is a Couple" b/w "Tin Top House"	Oct 1965	Sue – 45-135	—	—	113*	15	—	—	—	—	Non-album tracks
"Can't Chance a Break Up" b/w "Stagger Lee and Billy"	Dec 1965	Sue – 139	—	—	142*	33	—	—	—	—	Non-album tracks
"Dust My Broom" b/w "I'm Hooked"	1966	Tangerine – 45-TRC-967	—	—	—	—	—	—	—	—	Non-album tracks
"Betcha Can't Kiss Me (Just One Time Baby)" b/w "Don't Lie to Me (You Know I Know)" (Non-album track)	1966	Innis – 6666	—	—	—	—	—	—	—	—	So Fine
"River Deep – Mountain High" b/w "I'll Keep You Happy" (Non-album track)	May 1966	Philles – 131 HLU 10046	88	—	105*	36	26	62	9	3	River Deep – Mountain High
"Anything You Wasn't Born With" b/w "Beauty Is Just Skin Deep"	Jul 1966	Tangerine – 45-TRC-963	—	—	—	—	—	—	—	—	Non-album tracks
"Dear John" b/w "I Made a Promise Up Above" (from Don't Play Me Cheap)	Sep 1966	Sue – 146	—	—	—	—	—	—	—	—	Non-album tracks
"Two to Tango" b/w "A Man Is a Man Is a Man"	Oct 1966	Philles – 134	—	—	—	—	—	—	—	—	Non-album tracks
"A Love Like Yours (don't come knocking every day)" b/w Hold On Baby	Oct 1966	London - HL 10083									
"Get It – Get It" b/w "You Weren't Ready (For My Love)"	1967	Cenco – 112	—	—	—	—	—	—	—	—	Get It – Get It
"I Better Get Ta' Steppen" b/w "Poor Sam" (Non-album track)	1967	Innis – 6668	—	—	—	—	—	—	—	—	So Fine
"I Wish My Dream Would Come True" b/w "Flee Flee Fla" (Non-album track)	1967	Kent – K 45X457	—	—	—	—	—	—	—	—	The Soul of Ike & Tina (compilation)
"I'll Never Need More Than This" b/w "The Cash Box Blues" (Non-album track)	May 1967	Philles – 135	114*	—	—	—	—	—	—	—	River Deep – Mountain High (1969 Reissue)
"A Love Like Yours (Don't Come Knocking Everyday)" b/w "I Idolize You"	Aug 1967	Philles – 136	—	—	—	—	—	—	—	16	River Deep – Mountain High
" I'll Never Need More Than This" b/w Save the last dance for me	Nov 1967	London - HL 101155									
"So Fine" b/w "So Blue Over You" (from Cussin', Cryin' & Carryin' On)	Apr 1968	Innis – 6667 FLX 3206	117*	50	—	—	—	—	—	—	So Fine
"River Deep, Mountain High" b/w A love like yours	Apr 1968	London - FLX 3204									So Fine
"I Can't Believe What You Say" b/w Hard times	Apr 1968	Relax 45.111									So Fine
"We Need an Understanding" b/w "It Sho Ain't Me"	Aug 1968	Pompeii – 45-66675	—	—	—	—	—	—	—	—	So Fine
"You Got What You Wanted" b/w "Too Hot to Hold" (from So Fine)	Nov 1968	Pompeii – 45-66682	—	—	—	—	—	—	—	—	Cussin', Cryin' & Carryin' On
"Hard Times" b/w Gonna Have Fun	Jan 1969	Sonobel - 12015									
"I'm Gonna Do All I Can (to Do Right by My Man)" b/w "You've Got Too Many Ties That Bind"	Feb 1969	Liberty - 32060 Minit - 32060	98	46	—	27	—	—	—	—	Non-album tracks
"You Got What You Wanted" b/w Too hot to hold	Mar 1969	London - FLX3227									
"I've Been Loving You Too Long" b/w "Grumbling"	May 1969	Blue Thumb – BLU 101 UAR - 5c006-90191	68	23	91	—	—	78	—	—	Outta Season
"I Wish It Would Rain" b/w "With a Little Help from My Friends"	Jun 1969	Minit – 32068	—	—	—	—	—	—	—	—	Non-album tracks
"Cussin', Cryin' & Carryin' On" b/w "Shake a Tail Feather" (from So Fine)	Jul 1969	Pompeii – 45-66700	—	—	—	—	—	—	—	—	Cussin', Cryin' & Carryin' On
"Cussin' Crying and Carrying On b/w I'm fed up	Jul 1969	London - FLX 3233									
"The Hunter" b/w "Crazy 'Bout You Baby" (from Outta Season)	Jun 1969	Blue Thumb – BLU 102	93	37	114*	—	—	—	—	—	The Hunter
"Please, Please, Please" b/w He's the one	1969	Exit - 2547-B									
"River Deep – Mountain High" b/w "I'll Keep You Happy" (Non-album track)	Sep 1969	A&M – 1118	112*	—	129*	—	—	57	—	33	River Deep – Mountain High (1969 reissue)
"I Know"	Oct 1969	Blue Thumb – BLU 104	126*	—	—	—	—	—	—	—	The Hunter
"Bold Soul Sister"	Oct 1969	Blue Thumb – BLU 104	59	22	74	16	—	64	—	—	The Hunter
"I Wanna Jump" b/w "Treating Us (Women) Funky"	Nov 1969	Minit – 32077	—	—	—	—	—	—	—	—	Non-album tracks
"Come Together" b/w "Honky Tonk Women"	Dec 1969	Minit – 32087	57	21	52	34	42	63	—	—	Come Together
*single did not reach the main chart but was on Billboard Bubbling Under The Hot 100 or Cash Box Looking Ahead. "—" denotes a recording that did not chart or was not released in that country. N/A indicates Billboard R&B singles chart was discontinued.

=== 1970s ===
Single (A-side, B-side) Both sides from same album except where indicated	Release date	Label / Catalog	Peak chart positions										Album
Single (A-side, B-side) Both sides from same album except where indicated	Release date	Label / Catalog	US BB	US BB R&B	AUT	BEL	CAN	GER	ITA	NL	SWI	UK	Album
"A Love Like Yours (Don't Come Knocking Everyday)" b/w "Save the Last Dance for Me"	Feb 1970	A&M – 1170	—	—	—	—	—	—	—	—	—	—	River Deep – Mountain High (1969 reissue)
"I Want to Take You Higher" b/w "Contact High"	May 1970	Liberty – 56177	34	25	—	—	36	—	—	—	—	—	Come Together
"Please, Please, Please Pt. 1" b/w "Please, Please, Please Pt. 2"	Jul 1970	Kent K – 4514	—	—	—	—	—	—	—	—	—	—	Non-album tracks
"Workin' Together" b/w "The Way You Love Me"	Oct 1970	Liberty – 56207	—	41	—	—	66	—	—	—	—	—	Workin' Together
"Proud Mary" b/w "Funkier Than a Mosquita's Tweeter"	Jan 1971	Liberty – 56216	4	5	—	16	11	21	—	5	—	—	Workin' Together
"Ooh Poo Pah Doo" b/w "I Wanna Jump" (Non-album track)	May 1971	United Artists – 50782	60	31	—	—	67	—	—	—	—	—	Workin' Together
"I've Been Loving You Too Long" b/w "Crazy 'Bout You Baby"	Jun 1971	Blue Thumb – BTA 202	—	—	—	—	—	—	—	—	—	—	Outta Season
"Dust My Broom" b/w "Anything You Wasn't Born With"	Aug 1971	Tangerine – TRC 1019	—	—	—	—	—	—	—	—	—	—	Souled Out
"I'm Yours (Use Me Anyway You Wanna)" b/w "Doin' It" (from Come Together)	Oct 1971	United Artists – 50837	—	47	—	—	—	—	—	—	—	—	Non-album tracks
"Up in Heah" b/w "Do Wah Ditty"	Feb 1972	United Artists – 50881	83	47	—	—	84	—	—	—	—	—	Non-album tracks
"Feel Good" b/w "Outrageous" (Non-album track)	Apr 1972	United Artists – 50913	—	—	—	—	—	—	—	—	—	—	Feel Good
"Let Me Touch Your Mind" b/w "Chopper" (from Feel Good)	Oct 1972	United Artists – 50955	—	—	—	—	—	—	—	—	—	—	Let Me Touch Your Mind
"With a Little Help from My Friends"	Jan 1973	United Artists – UA-XW174-W	—	—	—	—	—	—	—	—	—	—	Live! The World of Ike & Tina
"Early One Morning"	Jan 1973	United Artists – UA-XW174-W	—	47	—	—	—	—	—	—	—	—	Let Me Touch Your Mind
"Work on Me" b/w "Born Free" (from Let Me Touch Your Mind)	May 1973	United Artists – UA-XW257-W	—	—	—	—	—	—	—	—	—	—	Non-album track
"Nutbush City Limits" b/w "Help Him" (from Let Me Touch Your Mind)	Aug 1973	United Artists – UA-XW298-W	22	11	1	19	46	2	5	12	2	4	Nutbush City Limits
"Sweet Rhode Island Red" b/w "Get It Out of Your Mind" (from Nutbush City Limits)	Mar 1974	United Artists – UA-XW409-W	—	43	—	—	—	43	17	—	—	51	Sweet Rhode Island Red
"Sexy Ida (Part 1)"	Aug 1974	United Artists – UA-XW528-X	65	29	—	—	—	—	25	—	—	51	Sweet Rhode Island Red
"Sexy Ida (Part 2)"	Aug 1974	United Artists – UA-XW528-X	85	49	—	—	—	—	—	—	—	—	Sweet Rhode Island Red
"Baby, Get It On" b/w "Baby, Get It On" (Disco version)	Apr 1975	United Artists – UA-XW598-X	88	31	—	20	—	—	—	9	—	—	Acid Queen (Tina Turner solo album)
*single did not reach the main chart but was on Billboard Bubbling Under The Hot 100 or Cash Box Looking Ahead. "—" denotes a recording that did not chart or was not released in that country.

=== 1980s ===
Single (A-side, B-side) Both sides from same album except where indicated	Release date	Label / Catalog	Peak chart positions		Album
Single (A-side, B-side) Both sides from same album except where indicated	Release date	Label / Catalog	US Dance	NL	Album
"Party Vibes"/"Shame, Shame, Shame"	1980	Fantasy – D-161	27	—	The Edge
"Shame, Shame, Shame" b/w "Party Vibes"	1982	Fantasty – 1A 006-64159	—	47	The Edge
"Living for the City" b/w "Bootsy Whitelaw"	1985	Striped Horse – SH 1201	—	—	Golden Empire
"—" denotes a recording that did not chart or was not released in that country.

== Promo singles ==
Single (A-side, B-side) Both sides from same album except where indicated	Release date	Label / Catalog	Album	Notes
"Something's Got a Hold on Me" b/w "You Are My Sunshine"	1966	Warner Bros. – W 5767	Live! The Ike & Tina Turner Show	Released in Norway
"Flee Flee Fla" b/w "Feel So Good" (From The Ike & Tina Turner Revue Live)	1969	Exit – 2549-B	Non-album track	Released in Spain; Released as B-side to "I Wish My Dream Would Come True" in 1966; Reissued on Ike & Tina's album Airwaves in 1978
"Respect" b/w "Son of a Preacher Man"	1970	Liberty – 2C 006–91.405	In Person	Released in France
"You Don't Love Me (Yes I Know)" b/w "I Know"	1971	Blue Thumb 2C 006–92.320 M	The Hunter	Released in France
"Soul to Soul" (Stereo Live Edit) b/w "Soul to Soul" (Mono Live Edit)	1971	Atlantic – PR-A-167	Soul To Soul	From the soundtrack of the film Soul to Soul
"Get Back" b/w "Let It be"	1972	United Artists – 35 448	Workin' Together	Released in Germany
"What You Don't See (Is Better Yet)" b/w "Tell The Truth"	1972	Liberty – FC-55088	'Nuff Said	Released in Brazil
"She Came In Through the Bathroom Window" b/w "What You See Is What You Get (What You Don't See Is Better Yet)" (From 'Nuff Said)	1972	United Artists – 5C 006-94030	Feel Good	Released in the Netherlands
"River Deep Mountain High 1974" b/w "Fancy Annie"	1974	United Artists – UP 35632	Nutbush City Limits	Released in France
"Delila's Power" b/w "That's My Purpose" (From Nutbush City Limits)	1975	United Artists – UP 36028	Delilah's Power	Released in Europe; The spelling of Delila was changed to Delilah for the album
"Raise Your Hand (U Got To)"	2005	Purple Eye Entertainment PEE1615	Golden Empire	Remixed by various DJ's and released on different labels

== Other appearances ==
Song	Release date	Label / Catalog	Album	Notes
"I Wish My Dream Would Come True"	1966	Stateside – SL 10203	Soul Supply	"I Wish My Dream Would Come True" was released as a single in 1966; Soul Supply is a compilation album featuring various artists
"Flee Flee Fla"	1966	Stateside – SL 10203	Soul Supply	"I Wish My Dream Would Come True" was released as a single in 1966; Soul Supply is a compilation album featuring various artists
"Dust My Broom"	1970	Tangerine – TRCS-1511	Souled Out	Ike & Tina Turner and The Raelets compilation album
"I'm Hooked"	1970	Tangerine – TRCS-1511	Souled Out	Ike & Tina Turner and The Raelets compilation album
"Anything You Wasn't Born With"	1970	Tangerine – TRCS-1511	Souled Out	Ike & Tina Turner and The Raelets compilation album
"Beauty Is Just Skin Deep"	1970	Tangerine – TRCS-1511	Souled Out	Ike & Tina Turner and The Raelets compilation album
"Soul to Soul"	1971	Atlantic – PR-A-167	Soul to Soul	Soundtrack album; recorded live in Ghana on March 6, 1971; "Soul to Soul" was released as a promo single; Album peaked at No. 10 on the Billboard R&B chart
"I Smell Trouble"	1971	Atlantic – PR-A-167	Soul to Soul	Soundtrack album; recorded live in Ghana on March 6, 1971; "Soul to Soul" was released as a promo single; Album peaked at No. 10 on the Billboard R&B chart
"I Think It's Gonna Work Out Fine"	1974	Casablanca – SPNB 1296	Here's Johnny: Magic Moments From The Tonight Show	Soundtrack album; performance recorded live on October 4, 1972; Album peaked at No. 30 on Billboard 200
"River Deep – Mountain High"	1977	Warner-Spector – 2SP 9104	Phil Spector's Greatest Hits	
"River Deep – Mountain High"	1991	ABKCO – 7118-2	Phil Spector: Back to Mono (1958–1969)	Ranked No. 65 (previously No. 64) on Rolling Stone's list of the 500 greatest albums of all time
"I'll Never Need More Than This"	1991	ABKCO – 7118-2	Phil Spector: Back to Mono (1958–1969)	Ranked No. 65 (previously No. 64) on Rolling Stone's list of the 500 greatest albums of all time
"A Love Like Yours (Don't Come Knockin' Everyday)"	1991	ABKCO – 7118-2	Phil Spector: Back to Mono (1958–1969)	Ranked No. 65 (previously No. 64) on Rolling Stone's list of the 500 greatest albums of all time
"Save the Last Dance for Me"	1991	ABKCO – 7118-2	Phil Spector: Back to Mono (1958–1969)	Ranked No. 65 (previously No. 64) on Rolling Stone's list of the 500 greatest albums of all time
"Gimme Some Loving"	2009	ABKCO – 18771024125	Get Yer Ya-Ya's Out! The Rolling Stones in Concert	Live recordings from the Rolling Stones 1969 American Tour
"Sweet Soul Music"	2009	ABKCO – 18771024125	Get Yer Ya-Ya's Out! The Rolling Stones in Concert	Live recordings from the Rolling Stones 1969 American Tour
"Son Of A Preacher Man"	2009	ABKCO – 18771024125	Get Yer Ya-Ya's Out! The Rolling Stones in Concert	Live recordings from the Rolling Stones 1969 American Tour
"Proud Mary"	2009	ABKCO – 18771024125	Get Yer Ya-Ya's Out! The Rolling Stones in Concert	Live recordings from the Rolling Stones 1969 American Tour
"I've Been Loving You Too Long"	2009	ABKCO – 18771024125	Get Yer Ya-Ya's Out! The Rolling Stones in Concert	Live recordings from the Rolling Stones 1969 American Tour
"Come Together"	2009	ABKCO – 18771024125	Get Yer Ya-Ya's Out! The Rolling Stones in Concert	Live recordings from the Rolling Stones 1969 American Tour
"Land Of A Thousand Dances"	2009	ABKCO – 18771024125	Get Yer Ya-Ya's Out! The Rolling Stones in Concert	Live recordings from the Rolling Stones 1969 American Tour
"Proud Mary"	2011	Time Life – 26508-D	The Best of Soul Train Live	Recorded live on April 22, 1972

== Home videos ==
List of home videos, with selected details and synopsis for each
Title	Details	Synopsis
The Ike & Tina Turner Show	Released: 1986; Label: Vestron; Format: VHS/LaserDisc	Performances from Ike & Tina Turner's appearance at the Cesars Palace in Las Vegas in 1971. Also features a backstage interview.
The Best of MusikLaden Live	Released: 1999; Label: Pioneer; Format: VHS/DVD	Performances from Ike & Tina on the German music programs Musikladen and Beat-Club.
The Legends Ike & Tina Turner Live in '71	Released: 2004; Label: Eagle Vision; Format: DVD + CD	A two-disc package featuring an Ike & Tina Turner concert at the Kurhaus Scheveningen in Den Hague, Netherlands on February 11, 1971. Also included is a one-hour CD of the concert including three songs not featured on the DVD.
Soul To Soul	Released: 2004; Label: Warner Music Vision; Format: DVD + CD	Documentary on the Independence Day concert in Ghana on March 6, 1971, featuring some of the leading soul and gospel performers of the time, intercut with footage of the performers rediscovering their roots and heritage.
Kenny Rogers: Rollin' Vol. 1	Released: 2007; Label: View Video; Format: DVD	Features performances from Ike & Tina Turner and Gladys Knight & The Pips on the Canadian TV show Rollin' on the River hosted by Kenny Rogers and The First Edition.
Playboy After Dark	Released: 2008; Label: ZYX Music; Format: DVD	Features Ike & Tina Turner's appearance on the TV show Playboy After Dark with live performances and an interview with Hugh Hefner.
Nutbush City Limits	Released: 2009; Label: Delta Entertainment; Format: DVD	Live performances from different TV shows including The Ed Sullivan Show, Musikladen and Don Kirschner's Rock Concert.
Ike & Tina On The Road: 1971–72	Released: 2012; Label: MVD Visual; Format: DVD	Photographer Bob Gruen and his wife Nadya filmed Ike & Tina Turner performing on the road and behind the scenes.
The Big T.N.T. Show	Released: 2016; Label: Shout! Factory; Format: DVD/Blu-Ray	A sequel to T.A.M.I. Show, filmed at the Moulin Rouge club in Los Angeles on November 29, 1965. The collector's edition T.A.M.I. Show/The Big T.N.T. Show is available on Blu-ray.

== See also ==
- Songs written by Ike Turner
- Songs written by Tina Turner
