= List of songs written by Tina Turner =

Songs written by Tina Turner

This list contains songs written by Tina Turner, including those where she is credited as a co-writer.

As half of the duo Ike & Tina Turner, Turner began writing in the late 1960s. At the encouragement of her husband Ike Turner, she began writing more once they created their own recording studio, Bolic Sound, in 1970. By 1972, she was recognized as an established writer. Turner wrote nine out of the ten songs on the duo's 1972 album Feel Good. Following their divorce in 1978, Turner retained songwriter royalties from songs she had written, but Ike Turner received the publishing royalties for his compositions and hers.

== Songs ==
Song	Year	Label & Catalog No.	Album	Writer(s)	Producer(s)
"I Am A Motherless Child"	1969	Blue Thumb – BTS 5	Outta Season	Tina Turner	Ike Turner, Bob Krasnow
"Bold Soul Sister"	1969	Blue Thumb – BTS-8811	The Hunter	Ike Turner, Tina Turner	Bob Krasnow
"I Wanna Jump"	1971	United Records – SUA 50782	Non-album track	Ike Turner, Tina Turner	Ike Turner
"What You Don't See (Is Better Yet)"	1971	Liberty – FC-55088	'Nuff Said	Ike Turner, Leon Ware, Tina Turner, Calvin Lane	Ike Turner
"Pick Me Up (Take Me Where Your Home Is)"	1971	United Artists – UAS-5530	'Nuff Said	Aillene Bullock, Ike Turner, Leon Ware, Tina Turner	Ike Turner
"Moving Into Hip Style - A Trip Child!"	1971	United Artists – UAS-5530	'Nuff Said	Ike Turner, Leon Ware, Tina Turner	Ike Turner
"Up In Heah"	1972	United Artists – 50881	Non-album tracks	Tina Turner, Leon Ware	Gerhard Augustin
"Outrageous"	1972	United Artists – 50913	Non-album tracks	Tina Turner	Ike Turner, Gerhard Augustin
"Feel Good"	1972	United Artists – 50913	Feel Good	Tina Turner	Ike Turner, Gerhard Augustin
"Black Coffee"	1972	United Artists – UAS-5598	Feel Good	Tina Turner	Ike Turner, Gerhard Augustin
"Chopper"	1972	United Artists – UAS-5598	Feel Good	Tina Turner	Ike Turner, Gerhard Augustin
"Kay Got Laid (Joe Got Paid)"	1972	United Artists – UAS-5598	Feel Good	Tina Turner	Ike Turner, Gerhard Augustin
"I Like It"	1972	United Artists – UAS-5598	Feel Good	Tina Turner	Ike Turner, Gerhard Augustin
"If You Can Hully Gully (I Can Hully Gully Too)"	1972	United Artists – UAS-5598	Feel Good	Tina Turner	Ike Turner, Gerhard Augustin
"If I Knew Then (What I Know Now)"	1972	United Artists – UAS-5598	Feel Good	Tina Turner	Ike Turner, Gerhard Augustin
"You Better Think of Something"	1972	United Artists – UAS-5598	Feel Good	Tina Turner	Ike Turner, Gerhard Augustin
"Bolic"	1972	United Artists – UAS-5598	Feel Good	Tina Turner	Ike Turner, Gerhard Augustin
"I Had A Notion"	1973	United Artists – UAS-5660	Let Me Touch Your Mind	Tina Turner	Ike Turner, Andre Williams
"Popcorn"	1973	United Artists – UAS-5660	Let Me Touch Your Mind	Tina Turner	Ike Turner, Andre Williams
"Help Him"	1973	United Artists – UA-XW298-W	Let Me Touch Your Mind	Tina Turner	Ike Turner, Andre Williams
"Nutbush City Limits"	1973	United Artists – UA-XW298-W	Nutbush City Limits	Tina Turner	Ike Turner
"That's My Purpose"	1973	United Artists – UA LA180-F	Nutbush City Limits	Tina Turner	Ike Turner
"Fancy Annie"	1973	United Artists – UA LA180-F	Nutbush City Limits	Tina Turner	Ike Turner
"Daily Bread"	1973	United Artists – UA LA180-F	Nutbush City Limits	Tina Turner	Ike Turner
"Club Manhattan"	1973	United Artists – UA LA180-F	Nutbush City Limits	Tina Turner	Ike Turner
"Sexy Ida (Part 1)"	1974	United Artists – UA-XW528-X	Sweet Rhode Island Red	Tina Turner	Ike Turner, Claude Williams, Gerhard Augustin
"Sexy Ida (Part 2)"	1974	United Artists – UA-XW528-X	Sweet Rhode Island Red	Tina Turner	Ike Turner, Claude Williams, Gerhard Augustin
"Sweet Rhode Island Red"	1974	United Artists – UA-XW409-W	Sweet Rhode Island Red	Tina Turner	Ike Turner
"Ready For You Baby"	1974	United Artists – UAS 29681	Sweet Rhode Island Red	Tina Turner	Ike Turner, Claude Williams, Gerhard Augustin
"Smooth Out The Wrinkles"	1974	United Artists – UAS 29681	Sweet Rhode Island Red	Tina Turner	Ike Turner, Claude Williams, Gerhard Augustin
"Doozie"	1974	United Artists – UAS 29681	Sweet Rhode Island Red	Tina Turner	Ike Turner, Claude Williams, Gerhard Augustin
"Delilah's Power"	1975	United Artists – UP 36028	Delilah's Power	Tina Turner	Ike Turner
"Unhappy Birthday"	1977	United Artists – UA-LA707-G	Delilah's Power	Tina Turner	Ike Turner
"(You've Got to) Put Something into It"	1977	United Artists – UA-LA707-G	Delilah's Power	Tina Turner	Ike Turner
"Nothing Comes to You When You're Asleep but a Dream"	1977	United Artists – UA-LA707-G	Delilah's Power	Tina Turner	Ike Turner
"Too Much for One Woman"	1977	United Artists – UA-LA707-G	Delilah's Power	Tina Turner	Ike Turner
"Trying to Find My Mind"	1977	United Artists – UA-LA707-G	Delilah's Power	Tina Turner	Ike Turner
"Too Many Women"	1977	United Artists – UA-LA707-G	Delilah's Power	Tina Turner	Ike Turner
