= The Ike & Tina Turner Story: 1960–1975 =

Compilation album by Ike & Tina Turner
- Released: October 2, 2007
- Length: 2:41:28
- Label: Time Life
- Producer: Bas Hartong, Colin Escott, Tom Vickers

Ike & Tina Turner chronology
His Woman, Her Man: The Ike Turner Diaries (2004)	The Ike & Tina Turner Story: 1960–1975 (2007)	The Collection (2009)

Professional ratings
Review scores
Source	Rating
AllMusic	4.5/5 stars
Popmatters	8/10 stars

The Ike & Tina Turner Story: 1960–1975 is an anthology released by Time Life in 2007. It contains a 3-CD compilation with a gatefold cover and includes a 24-page booklet.

== Content ==
The Ike & Tina Turner Story: 1960-1975 compiles recordings that documents Ike & Tina Turner's "evolution from a sharp-dressed St. Louis-based revue, to the opening act for the Rolling Stones, to the toast of Hugh Hefner's Playboy Mansion, to headlining the Soul to Soul 1971 concert in Ghana."

The first two discs features Ike & Tina Turner's greatest hits and some live tracks. The first disc concentrates on the first half of the '60s, and the second on their late '60s and '70s work. The third disc is devoted to the entire live album In Person, originally released in 1969, which finds its first CD release on this compilation.

== Critical reception ==
Reviewing the album for AllMusic, Stephen Thomas Erlewine wrote:

Time/Life's three-disc box The Ike & Tina Turner Story 1960-1975 comes close to being that long-awaited definitive set. It's close enough to satisfy...yet it falls just short of being the final word due to that long-standing problem of cross-licensing. Here, the blind spot is the mid- to late '60s, as this is missing the legendary Phil Spector production of "River Deep-Mountain High" and cuts that often show up on EMI-affiliated compilations, such as "Funkier Than a Mosquito's Tweeter" and other minor charting singles. These songs, especially "River Deep," are missed, but their absence hurts the set only slightly, because this traces their story very well and has all the other major hits and singles.

== Track listing ==
Disc 1
No.	Title	Writer(s)	Length
1.	"A Fool in Love"	Ike Turner	2:53
2.	"I Idolize You"	Ike Turner	2:51
3.	"I'm Jealous"	Ike Turner	2:13
4.	"It's Gonna Work Out Fine"	Sylvia McKinney, Rose Marie McCoy	3:03
5.	"Poor Fool"	Ike Turner	2:35
6.	"Don't Play Me Cheap"	Ike Turner	2:10
7.	"Tra La La La La"	Ike Turner	2:40
8.	"You Should'a Treated Me Right"	Ike Turner	3:40
9.	"Good Good Lovin'"	Albert Shubert, James Brown	2:27
10.	"Stagger Lee And Billy"	Ike Turner	2:51
11.	"Two Is a Couple"	Ike Turner	2:26
12.	"I'm Blue (The Gong-Gong Song)"	Ike Turner	2:33
13.	"I Can't Believe What You Say"	Ike Turner	2:02
14.	"A Fool for a Fool"	Ike Turner	2:38
15.	"Something's Got a Hold on Me" (Live track from Live! The Ike & Tina Turner Show)	Etta James, Leroy Kirkland, Pearl Woods	3:34
16.	"Tell Her I'm Not Home"	Tony Bruno	3:55
17.	"Finger Poppin'"	Ike Turner	2:50
18.	"I'm Gonna Do All I Can"	Wayne Carson	2:27
19.	"River Deep, Mountain High" (Live track from Live! The World of Ike & Tina)	Phil Spector, Jeff Barry, Ellie Greenwich	2:17

Disc 2
No.	Title	Writer(s)	Length
1.	"The Hunter"	Booker T. Jones, C. Wells, Donald Dunn, Steve Cropper, Al Jackson, Jr.	6:38
2.	"I've Been Loving You Too Long"	Otis Redding, Jerry Butler	3:56
3.	"Bold Soul Sister"	Ike Turner	2:39
4.	"Come Together"	Lennon–McCartney	3:40
5.	"Honky Tonk Women"	Mick Jagger, Keith Richards	3:11
6.	"I Want to Take You Higher"	Sly Stone	2:54
7.	"Workin' Together"	Eki Renrut (alias for Ike Turner)	3:33
8.	"Proud Mary"	John Fogerty	4:57
9.	"Get Back"	Lennon–McCartney	3:03
10.	"Ooh Poo Pah Doo"	Jessie Hill	2:39
11.	"I'm Yours (Use Me Any Way You Wanna)"	Calvin Lane, Philip Reese	2:51
12.	"Up In Heah"	Tina Turner, Leon Ware	3:04
13.	"Feel Good"	Tina Turner, Jesse G. James	3:27
14.	"Early One Morning"	Little Richard	3:39
15.	"Nutbush City Limits"	Tina Turner	2:58
16.	"Sexy Ida (Part I)"	Tina Turner	2:31
17.	"Sweet Rhode Island Red"	Tina Turner	3:17
18.	"Baby, Get It On"	Ike Turner	3:11
19.	"Acid Queen"	Pete Townshend	2:59

Disc 3
No.	Title	Writer(s)	Length
1.	"Intro / Soul Serenade" (Performed by DJ Bob Jones, Ike Turner & The Kings of Rhythm)	C. Ousley, L. Dixon	1:01
2.	"Everyday People" (Lead vocals by the Ikettes)	Sly Stone	3:05
3.	"Gimme Some Loving"/"Sweet Soul Music"	Steve Winwood, Muff Winwood, Otis Redding, Arthur Conley, Sam Cooke	2:27
4.	"Son of a Preacher Man"	John Hurley, Ronnie Wilkins	2:40
5.	"I Heard It Through the Grapevine"	Norman Whitfield, Barrett Strong	3:30
6.	"Respect"	Otis Redding	8:12
7.	"There Was a Time"/"African Boo's" (Lead vocals by the Ikettes)	James Brown, Buddy Hobgood, Ike Turner	3:33
8.	"Funky Street"	Arthur Conley, Earl Simms	1:56
9.	"A Fool in Love" (Lead vocals by the Ikettes)	Ike Turner	3:11
10.	"All I Could Do Was Cry"/"Please, Please, Please"/"Baby I Love You"	Billy Davis, Berry Gordy, Gwen Gordy, James Brown, Johnny Terry, Ronny Shanon	11:25
11.	"Goodbye, So Long"	Ike Turner	3:16
