= The Legends Ike & Tina Turner Live in '71 =

Video by Ike & Tina Turner
- Released: November 2, 2004
- Recorded: February 11, 1971
- Genre: R&B; soul; rock
- Length: 55:10 (DVD); 1:01:46 (CD)
- Label: Eagle Vision

Ike & Tina Turner chronology
The Best of MusikLaden Live (1999)	The Legends Ike & Tina Turner Live in '71 (2004)	Nutbush City Limits (2009)

The Legends Ike & Tina Turner Live in '71 is a live video album released by Eagle Vision in 2004. Its two disc package featuring a concert in the Netherlands during the pinnacle of Ike & Tina Turner's career. Also included is an hour-long CD of the concert with three additional songs. The "Soul To Soul" music video from the 1971 Soul To Soul concert in Ghana is included as a bonus feature.

== Recording ==
The concert was filmed at the Kurhaus Scheveningen in The Hague for Dutch television VPRO on February 11, 1971.

== Critical reception ==
Professional ratings
Review scores
Source	Rating
Allmusic	4/5 stars

Reviewing Live In '71 for AllMusic, Richie Unterberger wrote: "As a document of an exciting rock 'n' soul revue, it's pretty good, well-shot, and in restored color. The chief pleasure might be more visual than musical (although the soundtrack is in good shape as well), as Tina Turner and the three backing Ikettes go through their choreographed paces with earthy sensuality."

Steve LaBate wrote for Paste magazine: "The Revue rocks full throttle—from the band’s soulful instrumental take on Buddy Miles' 'Them Changes' and the Ikettes' spunky, short-skirted entrance to Tina’s gritty, revved-up soul belting. Today's TRL pop icons take heed: this video is undeniable proof you can dance your ass off without having to lip sync."

== Track listing ==
DVD
No.	Title	Writer(s)	Length
1.	"Them Changes" (Kings of Rhythm)	Buddy Miles
2.	"Sweet Inspiration" (The Ikettes)	Dan Penn, Spooner Oldham
3.	"I Want To Take You Higher"	Sly Stone
4.	"Ooh Poo Pah Doo"	Jessie Hill
5.	"A Love Like Yours (Don't Come Knocking Everyday)"	Holland–Dozier–Holland
6.	"River Deep, Mountain High"	Phil Spector, Jeff Barry, Ellie Greenwich
7.	"Come Together"	McCartney–Lennon
8.	"Honky Tonk Women"	Mick Jagger, Keith Richards
9.	"I Smell Trouble"	Don Robey
10.	"I Want To Take You Higher (reprise)"	Sly Stone
11.	"Proud Mary"	John Fogerty
12.	"Before And After Restoration Comparison" (Bonus feature)
13.	"Soul To Soul (music video)" (Bonus feature)

CD
No.	Title	Writer(s)	Length
1.	"Sweet Inspiration"	Dan Penn, Spooner Oldham	5:41
2.	"I Want To Take You Higher"	Sly Stone	3:16
3.	"Ooh Poo Pah Doo"	Jessie Hill	2:59
4.	"A Love Like Yours (Don't Come Knocking Everyday)"	Holland–Dozier–Holland	3:52
5.	"River Deep, Mountain High"	Phil Spector, Jeff Barry, Ellie Greenwich	3:30
6.	"Come Together"	Lennon–McCartney	3:23
7.	"Honky Tonk Women"	Mick Jagger, Keith Richards	3:07
8.	"Proud Mary"	John Fogerty	8:14
9.	"I've Been Loving You Too Long"	Otis Redding, Jerry Butler	6:52
10.	"Respect"	Otis Redding	4:19
11.	"Land Of 1000 Dances"	Chris Kenner	4:35
12.	"I Smell Trouble"	Don Robey	7:37
13.	"I Want To Take You Higher"	Sly Stone	4:21
