= Greatest Hits (Ike & Tina Turner album) =

Greatest hits album by Ike & Tina Turner
- Released: March 1976
- Recorded: March 1960 – November 1974
- Label: United Artists
- Producer: Ike Turner

Ike & Tina Turner chronology
Sweet Rhode Island Red (1974)	Greatest Hits (1976)	Delilah's Power (1977)

Professional ratings
Review scores
Source	Rating
AllMusic	4.5/5 stars
Christgau's Record Guide	A−

Greatest Hits is a compilation album of Ike & Tina Turner's most popular singles. It was released on United Artist Records in March 1976. This is the last album released while the duo were still together. The material spans 15 years, from their first hit single, "A Fool In Love" in 1960 up until their last "Baby, Get It On" in 1975. The album peaked at No. 71 in Australia.

== Critical reception ==
Billboard (March 6, 1976):

Collection of hits from the earliest days to more recent material makes up set that should pull in pop, soul and disco play. Good indication of the role the pair have played in the evolution of rock. Early hits were often recut by English groups, and later hits were often covers of white versions of the same songs. Interesting thing was the way Ike & Tina rearranged material to suit themselves and often became identified with the rearranged versions.

== Track listing ==
Side A
No.	Title	Writer(s)	Length
1.	"Proud Mary"	John Fogerty	3:15
2.	"Come Together"	Lennon–McCartney	3:37
3.	"Ooh Poo Pah Doo"	Jessie Hill	2:55
4.	"Nutbush City Limits"	Tina Turner	2:56
5.	"Sexy Ida (Part 2)"	Tina Turner	3:03
6.	"I Want to Take You Higher"	Sly Stone	2:51

No.	Title	Writer(s)	Length
1.	"It's Gonna Work Out Fine"	Rose Marie McCoy, Sylvia McKinney	3:02
2.	"A Fool in Love"	Ike Turner	2:52
3.	"Baby, Get It On"	Ike Turner, Tina Turner	3:13
4.	"I've Been Loving You Too Long"	Jerry Butler, Otis Redding	8:35

== Chart performance ==
Chart performance for Greatest Hits
Chart (1976)	Peak position
Australian Albums (Kent Music Report)	71
