= Soul to Soul =

Soul to Soul may refer to:

== Film and TV ==
- Soul to Soul (film), a 1971 concert by African-American artists in Ghana and a documentary film of the concert

== Music ==
- Soul to Soul (soundtrack), a 1971 live album by various artists from the accompanying film
- Soul to Soul (album), a 1985 album by American blues guitarist Stevie Ray Vaughan
- Soul II Soul, a British dance band popular in the late 1980s and early 1990s
- Soul2Soul Tour (2000) or Soul2Soul II Tour (2006–07), co-headlining tours by country music singers Tim McGraw and Faith Hill

=== Songs ===
- "Soul to Soul", a song by Another Pretty Face 1981
- "Soul to Soul", a song by Boz Scaggs 1988
- "Soul to Soul", a song by The Cockroaches 1990
- "Soul to Soul", a song by Michael Zager 1978
- "Soul to Soul", a song by The Temptations 1990
- "Soul to Soul", a song by Krokus from To Rock or Not to Be

== Organizations ==
- Nefesh B'Nefesh (Hebrew for "Soul to Soul"), a Zionist organization
