= 'Nuff Said (Ike & Tina Turner album) =

Studio album by Ike & Tina Turner
- Released: November 1971
- Recorded: 1971
- Studio: Bolic Sound
- Label: United Artists
- Producer: Ike Turner

Ike & Tina Turner chronology
Live in Paris – Olympia 1971 (1971)	'Nuff Said (1971)	Feel Good (1972)

'Nuff Said is a studio album by Ike & Tina Turner released on United Artists Records in 1971.

== Background ==
'Nuff Said was the third album released by Ike & Tina Turner in 1971; commercially their most successful year. The release of Workin' Together in December 1970 produced their hit single "Proud Mary" which helped propel the album to No. 3 on the Billboard Soul LP chart. In February 1971, Capitol Records reissued their album Get It – Get It and re-titled it Her Man. . . His Woman. Their live album What You Hear Is What You Get was released in July and peaked at No. 7 on the Billboard Soul LP chart. They were also included on the soundtrack Soul To Soul which was released in September and peaked at No. 10 on the Billboard Soul LPs chart.

== Recording and release ==
'Nuff Said was recorded at the Turner's own Bolic Sound studio in 1971. Unlike previous releases, their last name is not included on the album cover. The album features a two-part instrumental track as the title song. No singles were released from the album in the U.S., but it charted at No. 108 on the Billboard Top LPs and No. 21 on the Soul LPs charts. In 1972, "What You Don't See (Is Better Yet)" was released as a single in Brazil.

== Critical reception ==
Professional ratings
Review scores
Source	Rating
Allmusic	2/5 stars
Christgau's Record Guide	C+

'Nuff Said received positive reviews at the time of its release with some calling it their best album to date. Record World chose the album as one of their Picks of the Week.

Billboard (November 13, 1971):

This husband and wife team has always provided one of the most exciting concert acts possible and it's about time they had a real album winner. This entry will do it. "I Love What You Do To Me" has the feel of "Proud Mary" with Ike's bass voice pouring heavy. Other standouts include "Sweet Flustrations," "Moving Into Hip Style-A Trip Child" and "What You Don't See." Watch it Go!

Cash Box (November 13, 1971):

The fact that Ike & Tina can drop "Turner" from their act's name shows how popular they've gotten since touring with the Stones and starring in the "Soul To Soul" movie. The husband-and-wife team aim to please their expanded audience with a new look on the record jacket and a new sound inside.

== Reissues ==
'Nuff Said was digitally remastered and released by BGO Records on the compilation CD Come Together/'Nuff Said in 2010. In 2018, the album was reissued on CD by Universal Music.

== Track listing ==
Side A
No.	Title	Writer(s)	Length
1.	"I Love What You Do To Me"	Calvin Lane, Philip Reese	2:32
2.	"Baby (What You Want Me To Do)"	Aillene Bullock	3:27
3.	"Sweet Flustrations"	Ike Turner, Leon Ware, Philip Reese	2:55
4.	"What You Don't See (Is Better Yet)"	Ike Turner, Leon Ware, Tina Turner, Calvin Lane	3:15
5.	"'Nuff Said (Part I)"	Calvin Lane, Ike Turner, Philip Reese	3:12

Side B
No.	Title	Writer(s)	Length
1.	"Tell The Truth"	Ike Turner, Leon Ware	2:53
2.	"Pick Me Up (Take Me Where Your Home Is)"	Aillene Bullock, Ike Turner, Leon Ware, Tina Turner	4:23
3.	"Moving Into Hip Style - A Trip Child!"	Ike Turner, Leon Ware, Tina Turner	2:47
4.	"I Love Baby"	Calvin Lane, Ike Turner, Philip Reese	2:20
5.	"Can't You Hear Me Callin'"	Ike Turner, Leon Ware	2:26
6.	"'Nuff Said (Part II)"	Calvin Lane, Ike Turner, Philip Reese	2:01

== Personnel ==
- Arranged by – Ike Turner
- Baritone saxophone – J.D. Reed
- Bass – Warren Dawson
- Drums – Soko Richardson
- Engineer – Ike Turner, Jim Saunders, Steve Waldman
- Guitar – Jackie Clark
- Organ – Ike Turner
- Producer – Ike Turner
- Tenor saxophone – Mary Reed
- Trombone – Edward Burks
- Trumpet – McKinley Johnson

== Chart performance ==
Chart (1971 –72)	Peak position
US Billboard Top LPs	108
US Billboard Soul LPs	21
US Cash Box Top Albums	99
US Record World Albums	91
US Record World R&B Albums	18
