= I'm Gonna Do All I Can (to Do Right by My Man) =

- Dutch picture sleeve

Single by Ike & Tina Turner
- B-side: "You've Got Too Many Ties That Bind"
- Released: March 1969
- Genre: Soul music, R&B
- Label: Minit Records / Liberty Records
- Songwriter: Wayne Carson
- Producers: Ike Turner, Willie Mitchell

Ike & Tina Turner singles chronology
"You Got What You Wanted" (1968)	"I'm Gonna Do All I Can" (1969)	"I've Been Loving You Too Long" (1969)

"I'm Gonna Do All I Can (To Do Right By My Man)" is a song written by Wayne Carson. It was released by R&B duo Ike & Tina Turner on Minit Records in 1969.

== Recording and release ==
"I'm Gonna Do All I Can (To Do Right By My Man)" was recorded in January 1969 and released as a non-album track on Minit Records in March 1969. It was released on Minit's parent label, Liberty Records, in the Netherlands. Ike & Tina Turner promoted the song with the Ikettes on The Smothers Brothers Comedy Hour in April 1969. The single peaked at No. 98 on the Billboard Hot 100 and No. 46 on the R&B chart. It reached No. 27 on the Cash Box R&B chart.

The B-side "You've Got Too Many Ties That Bind " was reissued on the album Airwaves in 1978.

"I'm Gonna Do All I Can (To Do Right By My Man)" was reissued on the 3-CD compilation album The Ike & Tina Turner Story: 1960–1975, released by Time Life in 2007.

== Critical reception ==
Billboard chose the single as a spotlight feature predicted to reach the R&B chart.

Cash Box (March 15, 1969): "Heavy ballad outing with outstanding material and a very strong belting vocal make the newest Ike & Tina Turner set a winning turntable sound that could come to life saleswise.

== Track listing ==
No.	Title	Writer(s)	Length
1.	"I'm Gonna Do All I Can (To Do Right By My Man"	Wayne Carson	2:25
2.	"You've Got Too Many Ties That Bind"	Johnny Northern, Jimmy Bailay	2:31

== Chart performance ==
Chart (1969)	Peak position
US Billboard Hot 100	98
US Billboard R&B Singles	46
US Cash Box Top 50 R&B	27
US Record World Top 50 R&B	25
