= Live in Paris – Olympia 1971 =

Live In Paris – Olympia 1971

Live album by Ike & Tina Turner
- Released: August 1971
- Recorded: January 30, 1971
- Venue: Olympia (Paris, France)
- Label: United Artists; Liberty
- Producer: Eddie Adamis

Ike & Tina Turner chronology
What You Hear Is What You Get - Live at Carnegie Hall (1971)	Live In Paris – Olympia 1971 (1971)	'Nuff Said (1971)

Live In Paris – Olympia 1971 is a live album by Ike & Tina Turner released by United Artists Records and Liberty Records in Europe.

== Recording and release ==
By 1971, Ike & Tina Turner had incorporated rock songs into their repertoire and mainly performed covers of recent hits. They performed songs by the Beatles and the Rolling Stones, while still remaining true to their R&B and soul roots with covers like "Respect" by Otis Redding and "I Want To Take You Higher" by Sly and the Family Stone. In January 1971, Liberty Records released the single "Proud Mary" from the album Workin' Together to coincide with Ike & Tina Turner's French tour. The tour included dates at the Olympia in Paris. The concert on January 30, 1971 was recorded and released as a double album in Europe later that year. The album was arranged by Ike Turner and produced by Eddie Adamis. It peaked at number 25 in Germany.

== Reissues ==
Live in Paris was first reissued on CD by FNAC Music in 1992. It has since been reissued on CD by EMI Music in 2000 and Universal Music in 2018.

== Track listing ==
Side A
No.	Title	Writer(s)	Length
1.	"Grumbling" (Ike Turner)	Ike Turner	1:07
2.	"You Got Me Hummin'" (The Ikettes)	Isaac Hayes, David Porter	4:00
3.	"Everyday People" (The Ikettes)	Sly Stone	2:13
4.	"Shake A Tail Feather" (The Ikettes)	Otha Hayes, Verlie Rice, Andre Williams	2:13
5.	"Gimme Some Loving"/"Sweet Soul Music" (Ike & Tina Turner)	Steve Winwood, Muff Winwood, Otis Redding, Arthur Conley, Sam Cooke	3:39
6.	"Son Of A Preacher Man" (Ike & Tina Turner)	John Hurley, Ronnie Wilkins	2:45

Side B
No.	Title	Writer(s)	Length
1.	"Come Together" (Ike & Tina Turner)	Lennon–McCartney	3:30
2.	"Proud Mary" (Ike & Tina Turner)	John Fogerty	8:48
3.	"A Love Like Yours Don't Come Knocking Everyday" (Ike & Tina Turner)	Holland–Dozier–Holland	3:37

Side C
No.	Title	Writer(s)	Length
1.	"I Smell Trouble" (Ike & Tina Turner)	Don Robey	10.00
2.	"Respect" (Ike & Tina Turner)	Otis Redding	3:55
3.	"Honky Tonk Women" (Ike & Tina Turner)	Mick Jagger, Keith Richards	2:05

Side D
No.	Title	Writer(s)	Length
1.	"I've Been Loving You Too Long" (Ike & Tina Turner)	Jerry Butler, Otis Redding	7:15
2.	"I Want To Take You Higher" (Ike & Tina Turner)	Sly Stone	4:45
3.	"Land Of 1000 Dances" (Ike & Tina Turner)	Chris Kenner, Fats Domino	4:47

== Chart performance ==
Chart (1971)	Peak position
Germany	25
