= The Best of MusikLaden Live =

Video by Ike & Tina Turner
- Released: 1999
- Recorded: 1971–1978
- Length: approx. 30 mins
- Label: Pioneer Artists
- Producer: Gary Katz, Edward Secard, Matt Friedmann

Ike & Tina Turner chronology
| The Ike & Tina Turner Show (1986) | The Best of MusikLaden Live (1999) | The Legends Ike & Tina Turner Live in '71 (2004) |

The Best of MusikLaden Live is a DVD of performances by Ike & Tina Turner on the German television program Musikladen and its predecessor Beat-Club.

== Background ==
Beat-Club was the first music program on German television that featured international artists. It was co-created by Gerhard Augustin and Mike Leckebusch. In 1972, Beat-Club was renamed Musikladen. Augustin produced Ike & Tina Turner's 1972 album Feel Good. In 1975, Augustin left his position as head of A&R for United Artists Records in Munich to become Ike & Tina Turner's manager.

== Critical reception ==
Professional ratings
Review scores
| Source | Rating |
|---|---|
| Allmusic | 3/5 stars |

Reviewing Best of MusikLaden Live for Billboard (August 14, 1999), Catherine Applefeld Olson wrote:

VH1's second-greatest woman in rock (after Aretha Franklin) ignites like a stick of dynamite through eight vintage rockers in this collection of videoclips from the German television show "Musikladen." As part of the Spectacular Soul Revue, Tina was accompanied by husband Ike and several high-energy backup singers and dancers. She electrifies the stage....with performances culled during a period in which Tina's vocals grew stronger and her outfits grew more outrageous. There's not a mediocre selection in the bunch—they're all bona-fide groovin' hits.

== Reissues ==
The Best of MusikLaden Live was reissued with new packaging from Pioneer Artists in 2002.

== Track listing ==
| No. | Title | Writer(s) | Program & Airdate | Length |
|---|---|---|---|---|
| 1. | "Nutbush City Limits" | Tina Turner | Musikladen – December 5, 1973 |
| 2. | "Proud Mary" | John Fogerty | Beat-Club – February 27, 1971 |
| 3. | "Get Back" | Lennon-McCartney | Beat-Club – February 27, 1971 |
| 4. | "Acid Queen" (Tina Turner solo performance) | Pete Townshend | Musikladen – January 19, 1978 |
| 5. | "Delilah's Power" | Tina Turner | Musikladen – November 17, 1975 |
| 6. | "Honky Tonk Women" | Mick Jagger, Keith Richards | Beat-Club – February 27, 1971 |
| 7. | "Baby, Get It On" | Ike Turner | Musikladen – November 13, 1974 |
| 8. | "River Deep, Mountain High" | Phil Spector, Jeff Barry, Ellie Greenwich | Beat-Club – February 27, 1971 |
