= The Soul of Ike & Tina =

Compilation album by Ike & Tina Turner
- Released: 1966
- Recorded: 1964–1965
- Length: 47:27
- Label: Kent
- Producer: Ike Turner

Ike & Tina Turner chronology
Get It – Get It (c. 1966)	The Soul of Ike & Tina (1966)	River Deep – Mountain High (1966)

Singles from The Soul of Ike & Tina
- 1. "Good Bye, So Long" Released: May 1965; 2. "I Don't Need" Released: August 1965; 3. "I Wish My Dream Would Come True" Released: 1967

The Soul of Ike & Tina is a compilation album by R&B duo Ike & Tina Turner. Not to be confused by their 1961 debut album, The Soul of Ike & Tina Turner, this album was released by Kent Records in 1966.

== Content and release ==
After four years with Sue Records, Ike & Tina Turner signed with Kent Records in 1964. Kent was the follow-up to the bankrupted Modern Records. On the Kent label they released their first live album, Ike & Tina Turner Revue Live, and a few singles.

Ike Turner wrote all of the songs on The Soul of Ike & Tina. The track "Good Bye, So Long" was released as single on the newly revived Modern Records. It reached No. 34 on the Billboard's R&B Singles chart and No. 107 on Bubbling Under The Hot 100. The second single "I Don't Need," also released on Modern, reached No. 134 on Bubbling Under The Hot 100. Tina Turner made a solo appearance on Shindig! to promote the single in August 1965. She also performed the B-side "Gonna Have Fun" on Hollywood A Go-Go the next month. A third single, "I Wish My Dream Would Come True", was released by Kent in 1967.

== Reissues ==
In 2007, The Soul of Ike & Tina was reissued on CD by P-Vine Records with 13 additional tracks.

== Track listing ==
All tracks are written by Ike Turner.

Side A
No.	Title	Length
1.	"Good Bye, So Long"
2.	"If I Can't Be First"
3.	"Chicken Shack"
4.	"I Don't Need"
5.	"I Wish My Dream Would Come True"
6.	"Hard Times"

Side B
No.	Title	Length
1.	"It's Crazy Baby"
2.	"Gonna Have Fun"
3.	"Am I A Fool In Love"
4.	"Something Came Over Me"
5.	"Hurt Is All You Gave Me"
6.	"Don't You Blame It On Me"

== The Kent Years ==
The Kent Years

Compilation album by Ike & Tina Turner
- Released: May 2000
- Recorded: 1964–1965
- Length: 62:47
- Label: Kent Soul
- Producer: Ike Turner
- Compiler: Peter Gibbon

Ike & Tina Turner chronology
Live! The Ike & Tina Turner Show Volume I & II (2000)	The Kent Years (2000)	Funkier Than a Mosquito's Tweeter (2002)

Professional ratings
Review scores
Source	Rating
AllMusic	4/5 stars

The Kent Years is a compilation of recordings the Ike & Tina Turner recorded for Kent Records and Modern Records in 1964 and 1965. Released by Kent Soul in 2000, the album features most of the album The Soul of Ike & Tina with some additional tracks, including five previously unreleased songs.

=== Track listing ===
No.	Title	Writer(s)	Length
1.	"I Can't Believe What You Say"	Ike Turner
2.	"My Baby Now"	Ike Turner
3.	"What Do You Think I Am" (Previously Unissued)	Ike Turner
4.	"Baby, Don't Do It"	Ike Turner
5.	"I Don't Need"	Ike Turner
6.	"Goodbye, So Long"	Ike Turner
7.	"Hurt Is All You Gave Me"	Ike Turner
8.	"Gonna Have Fun"	Ike Turner
9.	"You Can't Miss Nothing (That You Never Had)"	Ike Turner
10.	"All I Could Do Was Cry (aka Stop The Wedding)" (Previously unissued)	Roquel Davis / Gwen Fuqua / Berry Gordy Jr.
11.	"I Need A Man"	Ike Turner
12.	"You Can't Have Your Cake And Eat It Too" (Previously unissued / Lead vocals by Ike Turner)	Ike Turner
13.	"Lose My Cool"	Ike Turner
14.	"He's The One"	Hank Ballard / James Brown
15.	"Chicken Shack"	Ike Turner
16.	"Five Long Years" (Previously unissued)	Eddie Boyd
17.	"Flee Flee Fla"	Ike Turner
18.	"I Wish My Dreams Would Come True"	Ike Turner
19.	"Over You"	Ike Turner
20.	"Makin' Plans Together"	Ike Turner
21.	"Shake It Baby" (Previously unissued)	Ike Turner
22.	"Don't You Blame It On Me"	Ike Turner
23.	"Hard Times"	Ike Turner
24.	"Give Me Your Love"	Ike Turner
25.	"It's Crazy Baby"	Ike Turner
26.	"Something Came Over Me"	Ike Turner
