= Two Is a Couple =

Single by Ike Turner
- Released: October 1965
- Genre: Pop; R&B
- Length: 2:30
- Label: Sue Records
- Songwriter: Ike Turner
- Producer: Ike Turner

Ike Turner singles chronology
"I Don't Need" (1965)	"Two Is a Couple" (1965)	"Can't Chance a Break Up" (1965)

"Two Is A Couple" is a song written by Ike Turner. It was recorded and released by R&B duo Ike & Tina Turner in 1965.

== Background and release ==
After three years with Sue Records, Ike & Tina Turner began recording on Ike Turner's Sonja label in 1963. They released numerous singles on various labels between 1964 and 1965 before re-signing to Sue in 1965. Their first record under the new contract was "Two Is A Couple," released as a non-album track in October 1965. It was written and produced by Ike Turner. The single peaked at No. 15 on the Cash Box R&B chart. Tina Turner performed the song on the TV program Where the Action Is. A different version of "Two Is A Couple" appeared on the album Airwaves (United Artists, 1978). The song later appeared on the compilation album The Ike & Tina Turner Story: 1960–1975 (Time Life, 2007).

== Critical reception ==
Professional ratings
Review scores
Source	Rating
Record World	4/4 stars

The single was chosen as Cash Box's Pick of the Week.

Cash Box (October 16, 1965): "Ike and Tina Turner return to the home of their original hits with this power-packed Sue release dubbed 'Two Is A Couple.' The side is a rollicking, fast-moving pop-r&b handclapper about a somewhat jealous lass who doesn't want any other female messing around with her fella. 'Tin Top House' is a lyrical, lush-sounding blues weeper with a nostalgic years-back sound."

Record World (October 16, 1965): "Couple will escort 'Couple' far and Sue folk must be happy to have them back aboard."

Billboard (October 23, 1965): "A blockbuster that rocks from start to finish. Hot chart item that will hit with great impact."

== Track listing ==
All tracks are written by Ike Turner.

No.	Title	Length
1.	"Two Is A Couple"	2:30
2.	"Tin Top House"	2:15

== Chart performance ==
Chart	Peak position
US Cash Box Top 50 R&B	15
US Cash Box Looking Ahead	113
US Record World Top 40 R&B	26
US Record World Singles Coming Up	112
