= What You Hear Is What You Get – Live at Carnegie Hall =

Live album by Ike & Tina Turner
- Released: July 1971
- Recorded: April 1971
- Venue: Carnegie Hall (New York City)
- Genres: R&B; soul; rock
- Label: United Artists
- Producer: Ike Turner

Ike & Tina Turner chronology
Her Man . . . His Woman (1971)	What You Hear Is What You Get – Live at Carnegie Hall (1971)	Live in Paris – Olympia 1971 (1971)

What You Hear Is What You Get – Live at Carnegie Hall is a live album by Ike & Tina Turner released on United Artists Records in 1971.

== Recording and release ==
What You Hear Is What You Get – Live at Carnegie Hall is a live recording of Ike & Tina Turner's doubleheader at the Carnegie Hall in New York City on April 1, 1971. The second show carried on into the early hours of April 2. Musician Fats Domino was the opening act.

In addition to Ike Turner–penned songs, the album includes interpretations of songs from Otis Redding, Sly Stone and the Family Stone, The Rolling Stones and their latest hit at the time, "Proud Mary" by Creedence Clearwater Revival. The album was released three months after the concert in July 1971. It reached No. 7 on the Billboard Soul LPs chart and No. 25 on the Top LPs chart. It was certified Gold by the RIAA in 1972.

What You Hear Is What You Get – Live at Carnegie Hall was the subject of the TV special Faberge Album of the Month, a series which featured "top contemporary recording artists and their hit LP's."

== Critical reception ==
Professional ratings
Review scores
Source	Rating
AllMusic	3.5/5 stars
Christgau's Record Guide	B+
Tom Hull – on the Web	B+

The album was chosen as Pick of the Week for Record World magazine.

Record World (July 3, 1971): "This boisterous two-record volume is what a Carnegie Hall audience got live not too long ago. When those who have paid their dues are discussed, Ike and Tina just about head the list. Tops."

Billboard (July 3, 1971):

This 2 record set of the Ike & Tina Turner revue's recent Carnegie Hall concert only hints at the charge of excitement generated by the Ikettes, Ike, and, especially Tina Turner before the capacity crowd. "Proud Mary," "Honky Tonk Women," "Ooh Poo Pah Doo," and excitingly visual "I've Been Loving You Too Long," suggests the frenzied entertainment they provided.

== Reissues ==
What You Hear Is What You Get – Live at Carnegie Hall was reissued on CD by EMI Records in 1996. In 2012, it was digitally remastered and released on CD by BGO Records.

== Track listing ==
Side A
No.	Title	Writer(s)	Length
1.	"Introduction"		1:30
2.	"Piece of My Heart" (performed by the Ikettes)	Bert Berns, Jerry Ragovoy	3:38
3.	"Everyday People" (performed by the Ikettes)	Sly Stone	2:10
4.	"Introduction to Tina"		0:40
5.	"Doin' the Tina Turner"	Ike Turner, Tina Turner	1:20
6.	"Sweet Soul Music"	Arthur Conley, Otis Redding, Sam Cooke	1:00
7.	"Ooh Poo Pah Doo"		4:05

Side B
No.	Title	Writer(s)	Length
1.	"Honky Tonk Women"	Mick Jagger, Keith Richards	3:05
2.	"A Love Like Yours"	Holland-Dozier-Holland	3:43
3.	"Proud Mary"	John Fogerty	6:35
4.	"(Encore Of) Proud Mary"	John Fogerty	2:35

Side C
No.	Title	Writer(s)	Length
1.	"Proud Mary (Continued)"	John Fogerty	3:25
2.	"I Smell Trouble"	Don Robey	7:57
3.	"Ike's Tune"	Ike Turner	0:30
4.	"I Want to Take You Higher"	Sly Stone	3:35

Side D
No.	Title	Writer(s)	Length
1.	"I've Been Loving You Too Long"	Otis Redding	8:35
2.	"Respect"	Otis Redding	5:03

== Chart performance ==
Chart performance for What You Hear Is What You Get – Live at Carnegie Hall
Chart (1971)	Peak position
Australian Albums (Go-Set)	38
Canadian Albums (RPM)	26
US Billboard Top LPs	25
US Billboard Soul LPs	7
US Cash Box Top 100 Albums	27
US Record World Albums	21
US Record World R&B Albums	5

== Certification and sales ==
Certifications and sales for What You Hear Is What You Get – Live at Carnegie Hall
Region	Certification	Certified units/sales
United States (RIAA)	Gold	500,000^{^}
^{^} Shipments figures based on certification alone.
