= I Don't Need =

Single by Ike & Tina Turner

from the album The Soul of Ike & Tina
- B-side: "Gonna Have Fun"
- Released: August 1965
- Genre: R&B
- Length: 2:15
- Label: Modern Records
- Songwriter: Ike Turner

Ike & Tina Turner singles chronology
"Good Bye, So Long" (1965)	"I Don't Need" (1965)	"Two Is a Couple" (1965)

"I Don't Need" is a song written by Ike Turner. It was released by R&B duo Ike & Tina Turner on Modern Records in 1965.

== Release ==
"I Don't Need" was Ike & Tina Turner's second release on the newly revived Modern label. Tina Turner promoted the record on Shindig! in August 1965. The single reached No. 134 on Billboard's Bubbling Under The Hot 100. Turner performed the B-side "Gonna Have Fun" on Hollywood A Go-Go and Where the Action Is. "I Don't Need" and "Gonna Have Fun" later appeared on the compilation album The Soul of Ike & Tina (1966), which was released on Modern's follow-up label, Kent Records, and on The Kent Years (2000).

== Track listing ==
All tracks are written by Ike Turner.

No.	Title	Length
1.	"I Don't Need"	2:25
2.	"Gonna Have Fun"	2:10

== Chart performance ==
Chart (1965)	Peak position
US Billboard Bubbling Under Hot 100	134
