= Kurhaus of Scheveningen =

Hotel in the Netherlands

Coordinates: 52°06′48″N 4°16′54″E

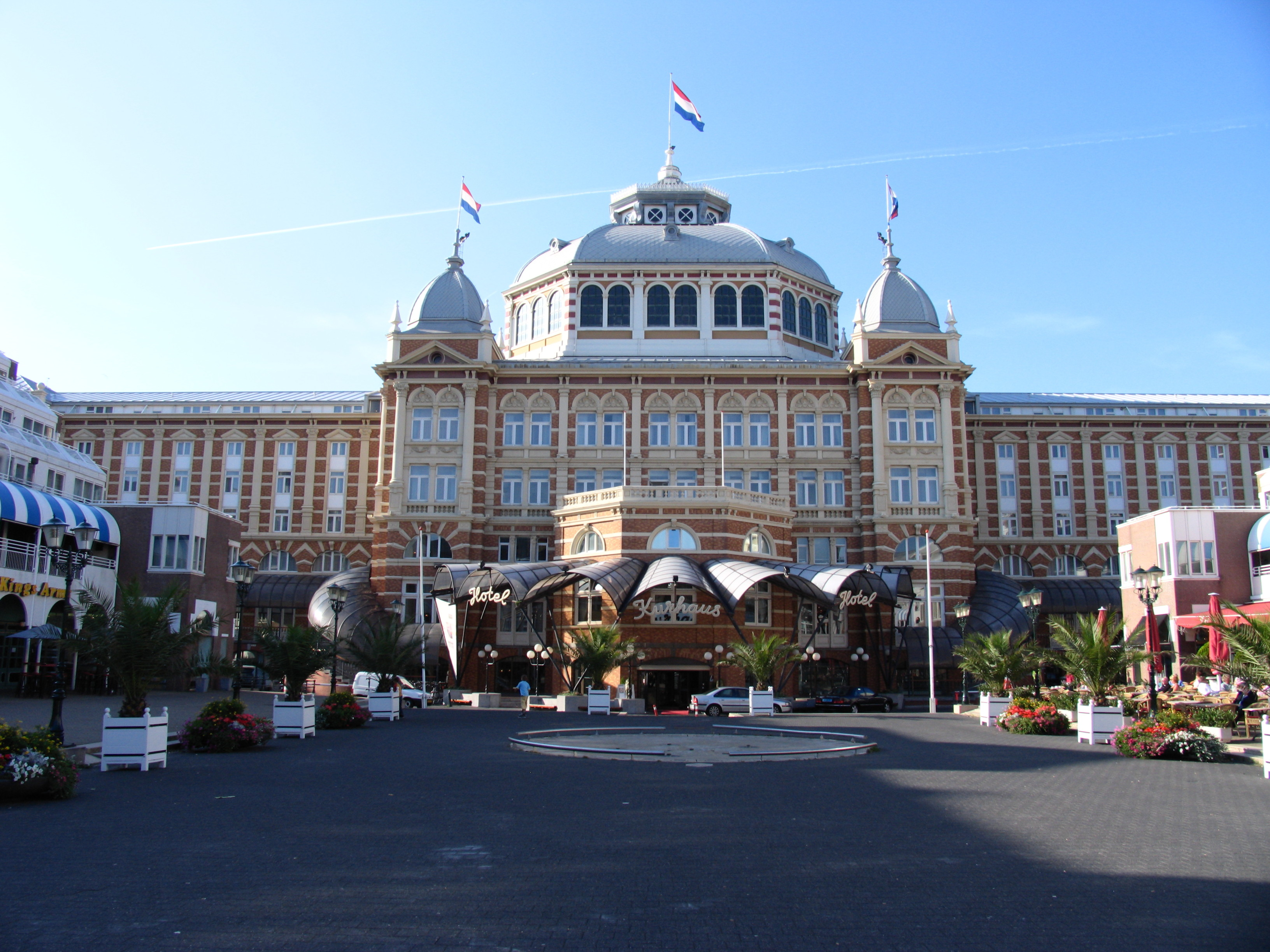
- Interactive map of the Kurhaus of Scheveningen area

The Kurhaus of Scheveningen, The Hague in the Netherlands is a hotel which has been called the Grand Hotel Amrâth Kurhaus The Hague since October 2014. It is located in the main seaside resort area, near the beach.

== History ==
The Kurhaus was built between 1884 and 1885 (141 years ago) by the German architects Johann Friedrich Henkenhaf and Friedrich Ebert. It consisted originally of a concert hall and a hotel with 120 rooms. Having suffered serious damage by fire, it was rebuilt between 1886 and 1887. The ceilings were painted by the Brussels artist Van Hoeck and his large workshop. Several kings and heads of state sojourned in the Kurhaus during its heyday.

Until the mid 1960s, the Kurhaus remained a public attraction as a major concert hall, at which many top artists performed. The Rolling Stones performed at the Kurhaus on 8 August 1964, and had to flee the building due to the vast numbers of excited fans outside.

Ike & Tina Turner performed at the Kurhaus on 11 February 1971. The show was aired on Dutch television VPRO and released on DVD in 2004 as The Legends Ike & Tina Turner Live in '71.

The Kurhaus was saved from demolition in 1975 by being listed as a historic building, and was completely renovated. It was reopened in 1979 in the presence of Princess Beatrix.

== Gallery ==
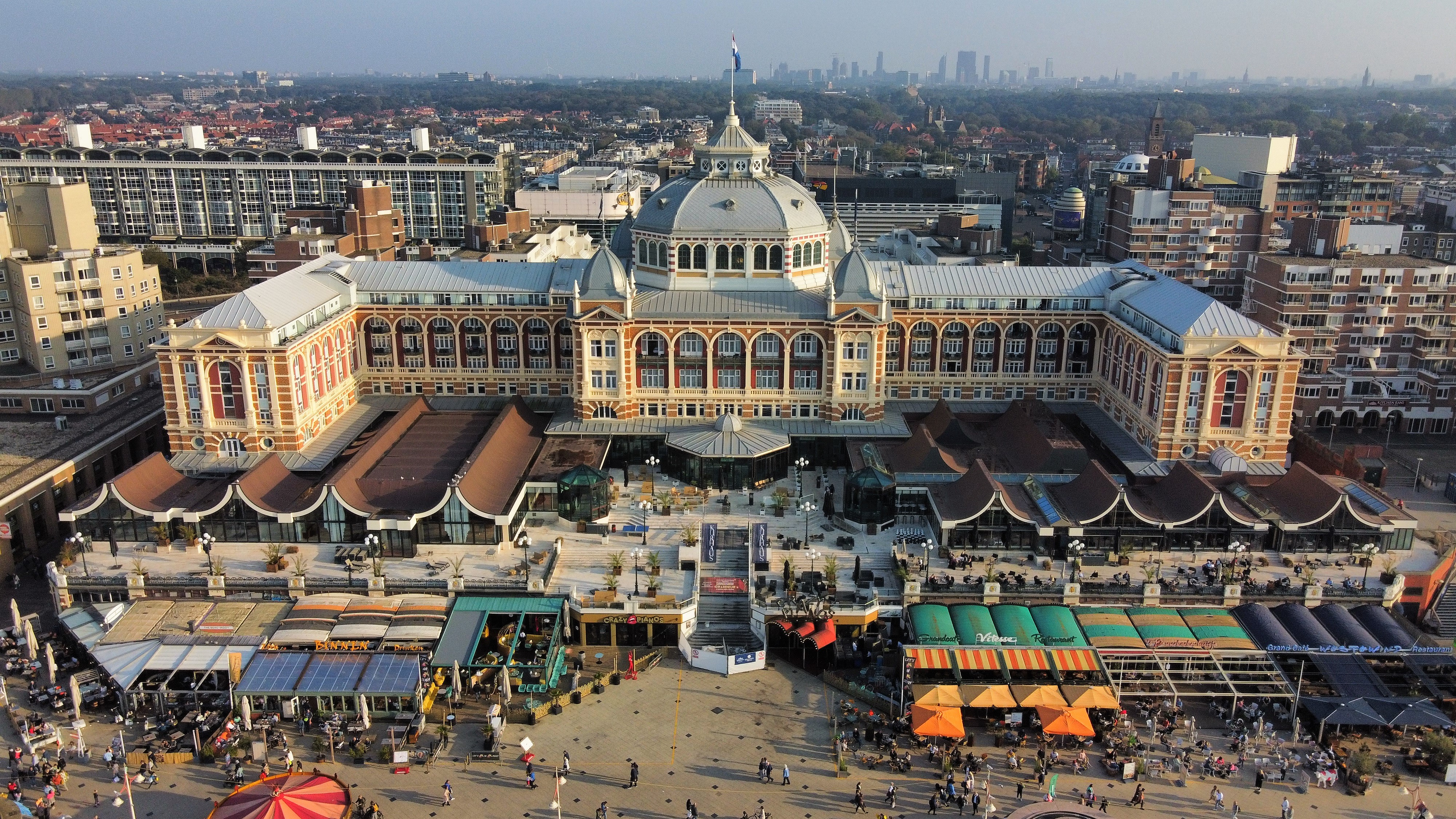
Kurhaus, seaside/rear view, with the skyline of The Hague in the background

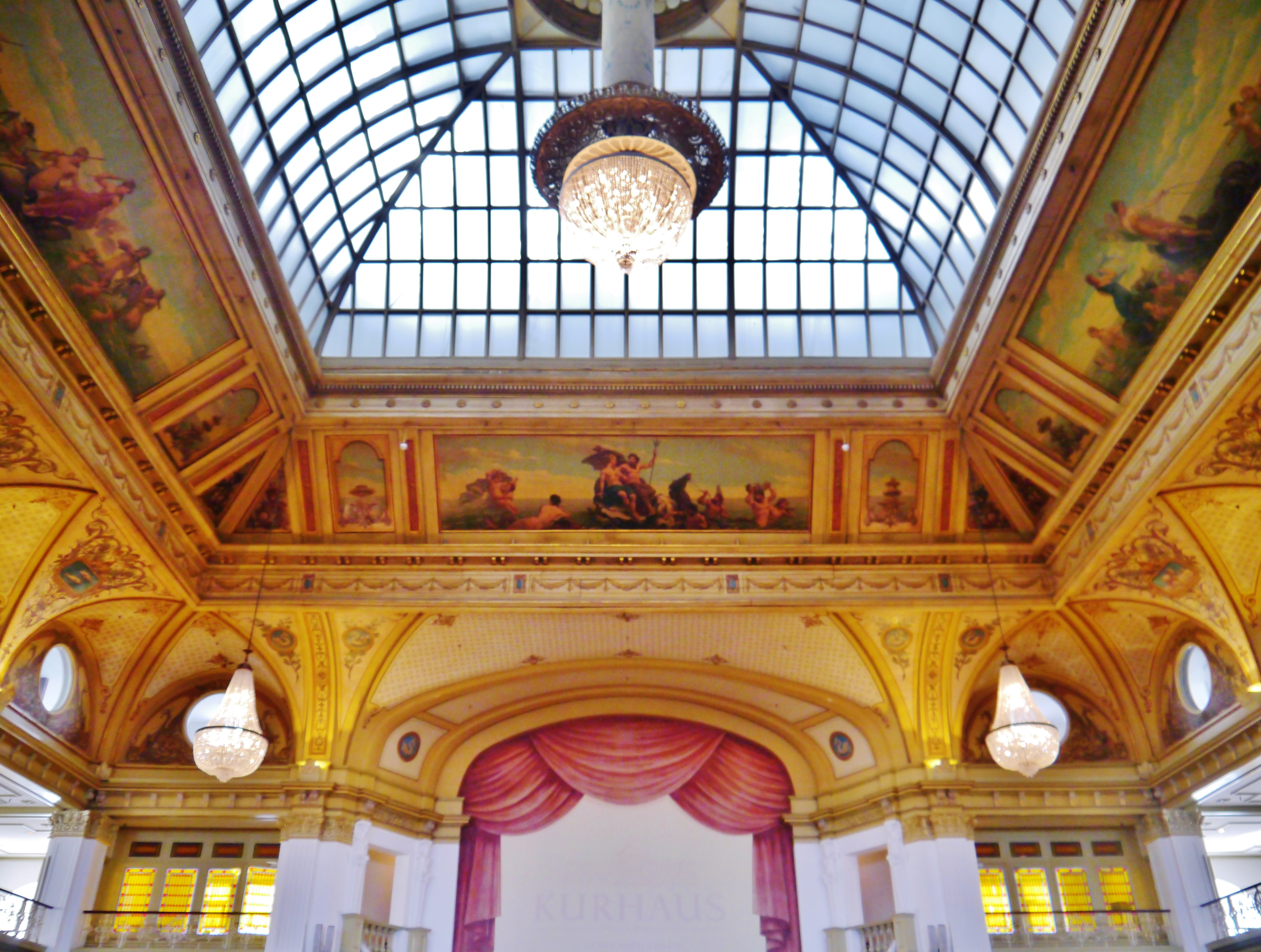
The Kurzaal, the biggest room in the hotel

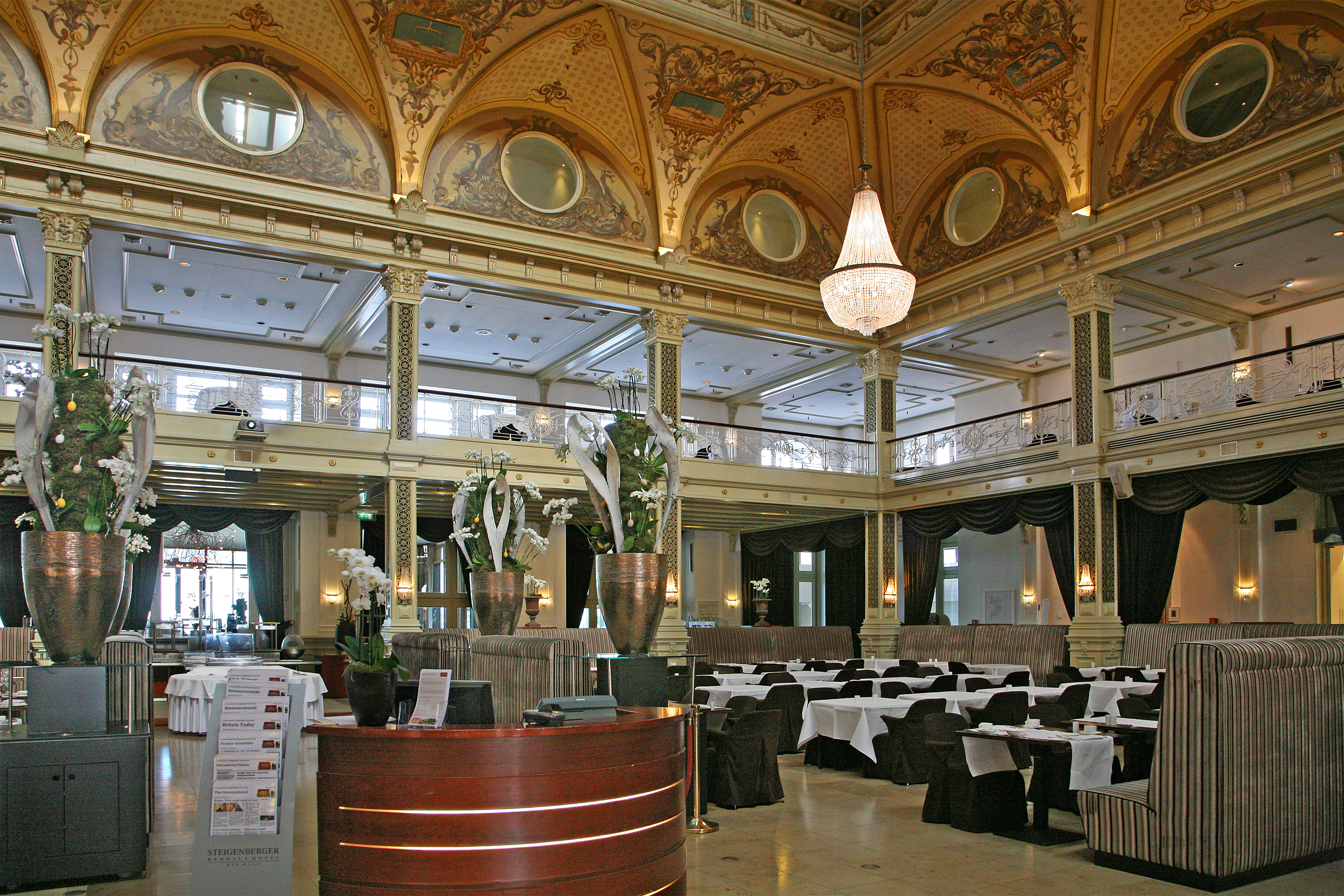

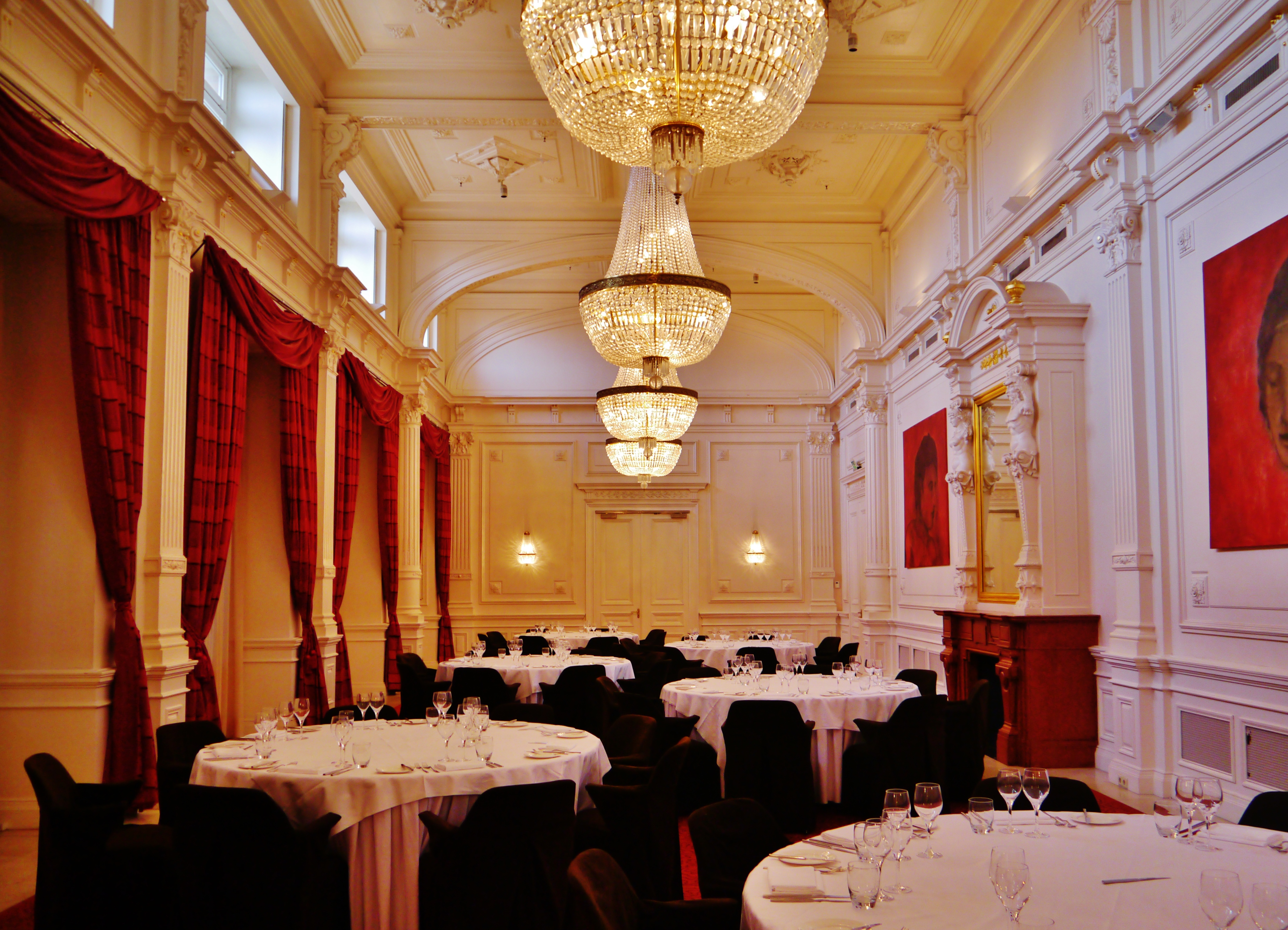
One of the Halls inside Scheveningen Kurhaus
