= You Can't Miss Nothing That You Never Had =

Single by Ike & Tina Turner
- B-side: "God Gave Me You"
- Released: February 1964
- Length: 2:04
- Label: Sonja Records
- Songwriter: Ike Turner

Ike & Tina Turner singles chronology
"If I Can't Be First" (1963)	"You Can't Miss Nothing That You Never Had" (1964)	"A Fool For A Fool" (1964)

"You Can't Miss Nothing That You Never Had" is a song written by Ike Turner and released by Ike & Tina Turner in 1964.

== Release ==
"You Can't Miss Nothing That You Never Had" was released as non-album track on Ike Turner's Sonja label in February 1964. At the time of the release, Billboard magazine had discontinued the R&B singles chart from November 30, 1963 to January 23, 1965. Billboard therefore uses Cash Box magazine's stat in their place. The single reached No. 29 on the R&B charts and No. 122 on Bubbling Under The Hot 100.

"You Can't Miss Nothing That You Never Had" was later included on the Kent compilations The Ike & Tina Turner Sessions (1987) and The Kent Years (2000).

== Critical reception ==
Professional ratings
Review scores
Source	Rating
Billboard	4/4 stars
Cash Box	B+

Cash Box (February 15, 1964): The vet r&b singers could create a sales stir with this top-flight medium-paced tear-jerker with commercial rhythmic, teen-angled beat. Eye it.

== Track listing ==
All tracks are written by Ike Turner.

No.	Title	Length
1.	"You Can't Miss Nothing That You Never Had"	2:04
2.	"God Gave Me You"	2:15

== Covers ==
- The Detroit Cobras released a version titled "Can't Miss Nothing" on their 2001 album Life, Love and Leaving

== Chart performance ==
Chart (1964)	Peak position
US Billboard Bubbling Under Hot 100	122
US Billboard R&B Singles	29
US Cash Box Top 50 R&B	29
