= Get It – Get It =

1966 studio album by Ike & Tina Turner

Studio album by Ike & Tina Turner
- Released: circa 1966
- Recorded: 1964–1966
- Genre: Blues
- Length: 25:09
- Label: Cenco
- Producer: Ike Turner

Ike & Tina Turner chronology
The Greatest Hits of Ike & Tina Turner (1965)	Get It – Get It (1966)	The Soul of Ike & Tina (1966)

Singles from Get It – Get It
- 1. "Strange" Released: 1964; 2. "Get It – Get It" Released: 1967

Get It – Get It is an album by Ike & Tina Turner released on Cenco Records circa 1966. The album contains two previously released singles. "Strange," written by Billy Preston was released from Ike Turner's own label Sonja Records in 1964, and a live version of "I Can't Believe What You Say (For Seeing What You Do)" was released from Kent Records in 1964. The latter single reached No. 95 on the Billboard Hot 100. The title track "Get It – Get It" was released as a single from Cenco in 1967.

== Background ==
After Ike and Tina's contract with Sue Records ended in 1964, the duo signed with many different labels for the rest of the 1960s. Between 1964 and 1969, they were signed to Kent, Warner Bros./Loma, Modern, Cenco, Philles, Tangerine, Pompeii, Blue Thumb, Minit and A&M. They also released material on the various labels Ike created.

== Reissues ==
Get It – Get It was reissued by Capitol Records as Her Man . . . His Woman in 1971. Get It – Get It was reissued by Pickwick/33 Records under the same title in 1972. Her Man . . . His Woman was reissued on CD by Universal Music in 2018.

== Her Man . . . His Woman ==
Her Man . . . His Woman

Studio album by Ike & Tina Turner
- Released: February 1971
- Label: Capitol Records
- Producer: Ike Turner, David Michaels

Ike & Tina Turner chronology
Workin' Together (1970)	Her Man . . . His Woman (1971)	What You Hear Is What You Get – Live at Carnegie Hall (1971)

Once Ike and Tina had a resurgence in the late 1960s, labels they were previously signed to released a multitude of old recordings. Her Man . . . His Woman is a reissue of Get It – Get It released by Capitol Records in 1971. The songs are remixed with strings, horns overdubs and in stereo. The album reached number 201 on Billboard's Bubbling Under the Top LP's.

=== Critical reception ===
Billboard (February 20, 1971):

After years of paying dues and appealing to a concerned minority, Ike and Tina are finally beginning to break through. This album, which captures the dynamic duo in typical urgent style, lacks their soul treatment on contemporary progressions rockers, but is down home soul. Examine what Tina does with the blues/gospel warhorse, "My Baby."

Professional ratings
Review scores
Source	Rating
Allmusic	2/5 stars
Christgau's Record Guide	C

Reviewing the album in Christgau's Record Guide: Rock Albums of the Seventies, Robert Christgau wrote:

Elevated by the Rolling Stones into mythic status among white people, the Turners are now haunted by their profligate recording habits – Capitol is the tenth label to release an I&TT LP in the past two years. Granted, most and maybe all of them are better than this, a humdrum blues runthrough (with big-band horns and fake-symph strings) on which Ike claims authorship of such works as "Dust My Broom" (here yclept "I Believe") and "Ten Long Years" (here yclept "Five Long Years"). Apparently it was cut some years ago for Cenco (?) Records. The Turners are currently contracted to Liberty, have authorized product out on A&M and Blue Thumb, and caveat emptor.

== Track listing ==
Length from Her Man . . . His Woman reissue.

Side A
No.	Title	Writer(s)	Length
1.	"Get It – Get It"	Ike Turner	3:31
2.	"I Believe"	Elmore James	2:19
3.	"I Can't Believe What You Say"	Ike Turner	2:07
4.	"My Babe"	Willie Dixon	1:59
5.	"Strange"	Billy Preston	2:36

Side B
No.	Title	Writer(s)	Length
1.	"You Weren't Ready"	Ike Turner	2:37
2.	"That's Alright"	Jimmy Rogers	3:02
3.	"Rooster"	Ike Turner	2:13
4.	"Five Long Years"	Eddie Boyd	2:42
5.	"Things I Used To Do"	Guitar Slim	2:24

Her Man . . . His Woman credits

- Engineer – Ed Flaherty, Hugh Davies
- Executive-Producer – Mauri Lathower
- Horns – Phil Wright
- Producer – David Michaels, Ike Turner
- Strings – Kirby Johnson
