= I'm Yours (Use Me Anyway You Wanna) =

- French picture sleeve

Single by Ike & Tina Turner
- B-side: "Doin It"
- Released: October 1971
- Studio: Bolic Sound, Inglewood, California
- Genre: R&B, funk rock
- Length: 2:50
- Label: United Artists
- Songwriters: Philip Reese, Calvin Lane
- Producer: Ike Turner

Ike & Tina Turner singles chronology
"Ooh Poo Pah Doo" (1971)	"I'm Yours" (1971)	"Up In Heah" (1972)

"I'm Yours (Use Me Anyway You Wanna)" is a song written by Philip Reese and Calvin Lane. It was recorded and released by R&B duo Ike & Tina Turner on United Artists Records in 1971.

== Recording and release ==
"I'm Yours (Use Me Anyway You Wanna)" was recorded at the Turners' Bolic Sound recording studio in Inglewood, California. The song was written by Philip Reese and Calvin Lane, and produced by Ike Turner. The B-side "Doin It" was written by Ike Turner.

The single was released as a non-album track in October 1971. It was the follow-up to the duo's release of "Ooh Poo Pah Doo" on United Artists Records, but because of their success earlier in the year with "Proud Mary", former labels that they were signed to reissued other singles that year, such as "I've Been Loving You Too Long" on Blue Thumb Records and "Dust My Broom" on Tangerine Records. "I'm Yours (Use Me Anyway You Wanna)" reached No. 47 on the Billboard R&B chart and No. 104 on Bubbling Under the Hot 100.

The song is included on the 3-CD compilation album The Ike & Tina Turner Story: 1960–1975, released by Time Life in 2007.

== Critical reception ==
The single received positive reviews in the United States.

Billboard (October 16, 1971): "Dynamic duo follow up 'Ooh Poo Pah Doo' with a funky beat blues swinger with even more play and sales potential than the recent hit."

Cash Box (October 16, 1971): "Having recently come into their own with 'Proud Mary,' Ike & Tina are likely to repeat with this latest effort. A natural for both r&b and pop markets, single should take off immediately."

Record World (October 16, 1917): "The Turners are back with another Tina tour de force. Sparks should fly all the way to the top of the pops. Warning: explosive stuff."

British magazine Blues & Soul (December 3, 1971) reviewed that it wasn't a good release. They felt it was uninteresting because "the usual drive and excitement is certainly missing."

== Track listing ==
No.	Title	Writer(s)	Length
1.	"I'm Yours (Use Me Anyway You Wanna)"	Calvin Lane, Philip Reese	2:50
2.	"Doin' It"	Ike Turner	2:40

== Chart performance ==
Chart (1971)	Peak position
US Billboard Soul Singles	47
US Bubbling Under Hot 100	104
US Cash Box Top 100	80
US Cash Box R&B Top 60	29
US Record World Singles	92
US Record World R&B Singles	35
