= A Fool for a Fool =

Single by Ike & Tina Turner
- B-side: "No Tears To Cry"
- Released: April 1964
- Length: 2:34
- Label: Warner Bros. Records
- Songwriter: Ike Turner
- Producer: Buck Ram

Ike & Tina Turner singles chronology
"You Can't Miss Nothing That You Never Had" (1964)	"A Fool for a Fool" (1964)	"It's All Over" (1964)

"A Fool For A Fool" is a song written by Ike Turner, and released by Ike & Tina Turner in 1964.

== Release ==
"A Fool For A Fool" was written by Ike Turner produced by Buck Ram. Ram wrote and produced the B-side "No Tears To Cry." Released as a non-album track in April 1964, the single reached No. 47 on the Cash Box R&B chart. At the time of the release, Billboard magazine had discontinued their R&B singles chart from November 30, 1963 to January 23, 1965. Billboard therefore uses Cash Box magazine's stat in their place.

"A Fool For A Fool" was reissued on the compilation album The Ike & Tina Turner Story: 1960–1975 in 2007.

== Critical reception ==
Cash Box (May 2, 1964): "Chances are Ike & Tina Turner will get back on the big hit track with this Warner Bros. bow. Side to watch is 'A Fool For A Fool,' an infectious rock-a-rhythmic cha cha weeper that has Ike's instrumentalists tastefully backing up Tina's winning (partly) multi-tracked vocal. Backing's a heartfelt beat-balled opus that also rates attention."

== Track listing ==
No.	Title	Writer(s)	Length
1.	"A Fool For A Fool"	Ike Turner	2:34
2.	"No Tears To Cry"	Buck Ram	2:34

== Chart performance ==
Chart (1964)	Peak position
US Billboard R&B Singles	47
US Cash Box Top 50 R&B	47
