= Can't Chance a Break Up =

Single by Ike & Tina Turner
- B-side: "Stagger Lee And Billy"
- Released: December 1965
- Genre: R&B; soul
- Length: 2:30
- Label: Sue Records
- Songwriter: Ike Turner
- Producers: I & TT Production

Ike & Tina Turner singles chronology
"Two Is a Couple" (1965)	"Can't Chance a Break Up" (1965)	"Dust My Broom" (1966)

"Can't Chance a Break Up" is a song written by Ike Turner. It was released by R&B duo Ike & Tina Turner on Sue Records in 1965.

== Background and release ==
Professional ratings
Review scores
Source	Rating
Record World	4/4 stars

"Can't Chance a Break Up" is the second single Ike & Tina Turner released after re-signing to Sue in 1965. They had released a string of hit singles on Sue from 1960 to 1962 before switching to Ike Turner's Sonja label in 1963. After releasing singles on various labels between 1963 and 1965, they returned to Sue with the release of "Two Is a Couple" was in October 1965. "Can't Chance a Break Up" was released as a non-album track in December 1965, reaching No. 33 on the Cash Box R&B chart in January 1966.

== Critical reception ==
Billboard (December 18, 1965): "This blues-rocker with wailing vocal performances loaded with electricity will prove a sales monster. Discotheque winner!"

Cash Box (December 18, 1965): "Wailing moanin’ powerfully orked soulfilled shouter. Easy to dance to sound and good romance lyric should have lots of appeal for the teen market generally and the r&b set in particular."

Record World (December 25, 1965): "Wailing new Ike and Tina side featuring go go rhythms for the dance fans. Score."

== Track listing ==
All tracks are written by Ike Turner.

No.	Title	Length
1.	"Can't Chance A Break Up"	2:30
2.	"Stagger Lee And Billy"	2:48

== Chart performance ==
Chart (1966)	Peak position
US Cash Box Top 50 R&B	33
US Cash Box Looking Ahead	142
US Record World Singles Coming Up	135
