= Up in Heah =

"Up In Heah"
- German picture sleeve

Single by Ike & Tina Turner
- B-side: "Doo Wah Ditty (Got To Get Ta)"
- Released: February 1972
- Recorded: December 1971
- Studio: Bolic Sound (Inglewood, CA)
- Genre: Rock; Southern soul
- Length: 3:03
- Label: United Artists Records
- Songwriters: Tina Turner, Leon Ware
- Producer: Gerhard Augustin

Ike & Tina Turner singles chronology
"I'm Yours (Use Me Anyway You Wanna)" (1971)	"Up In Heah" (1972)	"Feel Good" (1972)

"Up In Heah" is a song written by Tina Turner and Leon Ware. It was released as a single by R&B duo Ike & Tina Turner on United Artists Records in 1972.

== Background and release ==
After a period which Ike & Tina Turner recorded mostly cover songs, Tina Turner began honing her writing skills in the early 1970s with the establishment of the duo's Bolic Sound recording studio. She wrote nine out of the ten songs on the 1972 album Feel Good. "Up In Heah," penned by Tina Turner and Leon Ware, was recorded at Bolic Sound in December 1971. It was arranged by Ike Turner and produced by Gerhard Augustin. The B-side, "Doo Wah Ditty (Got To Get Ta)," was written by Ike & Tina Turner's road manager Rhonda Graam.

The single was released as a non-album track in February 1972. It reached No. 83 on the Billboard Hot 100 and peaked at No. 47 on the R&B chart.

"Up In Heah" was reissued on the compilation albums Proud Mary: The Best of Ike & Tina Turner (1991) and The Ike & Tina Turner Story: 1960–1975 (2007).

== Critical reception ==
Cash Box (February 12, 1972): "Pair has the PA circuit constantly screaming for more, but have been looking for the super follow-up to 'Proud Mary.' Here 'tis: Top 40's and r&b's, get it while it's sizzlin'."

Record World (February 12, 1972): "Tina herself wrote this song of sin and redemption and sings it with characteristic fervor. Dig Ike's incredible bass vocal."

== Track listing ==
No.	Title	Writer(s)	Length
1.	"Up In Heah"	Tina Turner, Leon Ware	3:03
2.	"Doo Wah Ditty (Got To Get Ta)"	Rhonda Graam	2:40

== Chart performance ==
Chart (1972)	Peak position
Canada (RPM Weekly)	82
US Billboard Hot 100	83
US Billboard Soul Singles	47
US Cash Box Top 100	70
US Cash Box R&B Top 60	36
US Record World R&B Singles	36
