= Black Coffee (Ike & Tina Turner song) =

1972 song by Ike & Tina Turner

Song by Ike & Tina Turner

from the album Feel Good
- Studio: Bolic Sound (Inglewood, California)
- Length: 2:42
- Songwriter: Tina Turner
- Producers: Ike Turner, Gerhard Augustin

"Black Coffee" is a song written by Tina Turner. It was originally recorded by Ike & Tina Turner for their 1972 album Feel Good on United Artists Records. English rock band Humble Pie released a popular rendition of the song in 1973.

== Humble Pie version ==
"Black Coffee"

Single by Humble Pie

from the album Eat It
- B-side: "Say No More"
- Released: February 1973
- Genre: Blues rock
- Length: 3:09
- Label: A&M Records
- Songwriters: Ike & Tina Turner
- Producer: The Pie

Humble Pie singles chronology
"30 Days In The Hole" (1972)	"Black Coffee" (1973)	"Get Down To It" (1973)

Humble Pie covered "Black Coffee" for their 1973 album Eat It on A&M Records. Their version features the Blackberries singing backing vocals. Steve Marriott adjusted some of the lyrics. In the original version, Tina Turner sings, "My skin is brown but my mind is black." Marriott sings, "My skin is white but my soul is black." When questioned about the lyrics by journalist James Johnson of NME, Marriott said: "I just sang it 'cos I loved the song and it was an interpretation of somebody else's lyrics. People should have known that I've been into black music for years anyway."

Humble Pie promoted the song on the British TV program The Old Grey Whistle Test in March 1973. The single didn't make an impression on the charts, but it became one of Humble Pie's best known songs, and is considered one of Marriott's best vocal performances.

In 1989, Marriott and Clem Clempson recorded the song as a jingle for Nescafé coffee's new product – Blend 37. They won a Gold Medal Award for the top Commercial 1989.

=== Critical reception ===
Cash Box (March 3, 1973): "From their forthcoming album, 'Eat It' comes this enticing Ike & Tina Turner composition tailor made for Steve Marriott's raspy vocals. This is a slice of the Pie you won't want to miss.

=== Chart performance ===
Chart (1973)	Peak position
US Billboard Bubbling Under Hot 100	113
US Cash Box Looking Ahead	107
US Record World Singles 101–150	111
