= Feel Good (Ike & Tina Turner song) =

- German picture sleeve

Single by Ike & Tina Turner

from the album Feel Good
- B-side: Outrageous
- Released: April 1972
- Recorded: March 1972
- Studio: Bolic Sound (Inglewood, California)
- Genre: Funk rock; soul
- Length: 3:32
- Label: United Artists Records
- Songwriter: Tina Turner
- Producers: Ike Turner, Gerhard Augustin

Ike & Tina Turner singles chronology
"Up In Heah" (1972)	"Feel Good" (1972)	"Let Me Touch Your Mind" (1972)

"Feel Good" is a song written by Tina Turner. It was released as a single by R&B duo Ike & Tina Turner on United Artists Records in 1972.

== Recording and release ==
"Feel Good" was written by Tina Turner and recorded at her recording studio, Bolic Sound, in March 1972. The record was produced by Ike Turner and Gerhard Augustin. It was released on United Artists Records as the first single from Ike & Tina Turner's album Feel Good. They promoted the single on Soul Train on April 22, 1972 and on The Tonight Show Starring Johnny Carson the same year. The song later appeared on the compilation album The Ike & Tina Turner Story: 1960–1975 in 2007.

== Critical reception ==
The single received positive reviews.

Record World (May 6, 1972): "You can hardly help but feel good after listening to the latest from Ike & Tina. Typically great release, written by Tina."

Cash Box (May 6, 1972): "Tina explodes on vocals, Ike does crazy things guitar-wise and everything's righteous. Lyrics are especially ear catchin' this time out for the duo."

== Track listing ==
All tracks are written by Tina Turner.

No.	Title	Length
1.	"Feel Good"	3:24
2.	"Outrageous"	2:16

== Chart performance ==
Chart (1972)	Peak position
US Cash Box R&B Top 60	48
US Cash Box Looking Ahead	101
US Record World Singles	95
