= Delilah's Power =

Studio album by Ike & Tina Turner
- Released: 1977
- Recorded: 1975–76
- Length: 38:22
- Label: United Artists
- Producer: Ike Turner
- Compiler: Alan Warner

Ike & Tina Turner chronology
Sweet Rhode Island Red (1974)	Delilah's Power (1977)	Airwaves (1978)

Singles from Delilah's Power
- 1. "Delilah's Power" Released: October 1975

Delilah's Power is the final studio album by Ike & Tina Turner, released in 1977. The album was released by United Artists Records a year after the Turners split up. The tracks are from some of their last recording sessions together. The album was reissued by BGO Records on the compilation CD Delilah's Power/Airwaves in 2011.

== Single ==
The only single from the album, "Delila's Power" (an "h" was later added on Delila), was released in Europe in 1975. The song was written by Tina Turner and although it received positive reviews, critics noted the similarities between the track and its predecessor "Nutbush City Limits."

== Critical reception ==
Professional ratings
Review scores
Source	Rating
AllMusic	3/5 stars
The Virgin Encyclopedia of R&B and Soul	2/5 stars

Reviewing the single, the Acton Gazette wrote: "The soulful couple do it again with another stomping hit designed to let Tina's amazing voice sparkle. Very similar to 'Nutbush City Limits,' their last big hit, but powerful enough to get away with it."

Similarly, Blues & Soul wrote: "When it comes to rockin' excitement, Tina Turner has no peers and though this belter is perhaps too similar to 'Nutbush City Limits,' the upcoming British concert(s), could give sufficient support to carry this one home."

== Track list ==
Side one
No.	Title	Writer(s)	Length
1.	"Delilah's Power"	Tina Turner	2:57
2.	"Never Been to Spain" (Three Dog Night cover from the album Harmony)	Hoyt Axton	3:00
3.	"Unhappy Birthday"	Tina Turner	3:07
4.	"(You've Got to) Put Something into It"	Tina Turner	2:35
5.	"Nothing Comes to You When You're Asleep but a Dream"	Tina Turner	4:00
6.	"Stormy Weather" (Ethel Waters cover)	Ted Koehler, Harold Arlen	2.35

Side two
No.	Title	Writer(s)	Length
1.	"Sugar, Sugar" (The Archies cover from the album Everything's Archie)	Jeff Barry, Andy Kim	2:43
2.	"Too Much for One Woman"	Tina Turner	3:00
3.	"Trying to Find My Mind"	Tina Turner	3:50
4.	"Pick Me Up (Take Me Where Your Home Is)"	Leon Ware, Ike Turner, Tina Turner, Aillene Bullock	3:18
5.	"Too Many Women"	Tina Turner	3:34
6.	"I Want to Take You Higher" (Sly and the Family Stone cover from the album Stand!)	Sly Stone	3:43

== Personnel ==
- Album compiled by: Alan Warner
- Album Coordinator: John Ierardi
- Designed by John Kosh
- Art director, Ria Lewerke
- Illustration (cover) by: Bob Hickson
- Liner photographs by: Norman Seeff
