= Good Bye, So Long =

Single by Ike & Tina Turner

from the album The Soul of Ike & Tina
- B-side: "Hurt Is All You Gave Me"
- Released: May 1965
- Genre: R&B, pop
- Length: 2:17
- Label: Modern
- Songwriter: Ike Turner
- Producer: Ike Turner

Ike & Tina Turner singles chronology
| "Somebody Needs You" (1965) | "Good Bye, So Long" (1965) | "I Don't Need" (1965) |

Professional ratings
Review scores
| Source | Rating |
|---|---|
| Billboard | 4/4 stars |
| Cash Box | B |

"Good Bye, So Long" is a song written by Ike Turner. It was originally released by R&B duo Ike & Tina Turner in 1965.

== Release ==
"Good Bye, So Long" was released as a single on Modern Records in May 1965. It reached No. 31 on Billboard's R&B Singles chart and No. 108 on Bubbling Under The Hot 100. Tina Turner promoted the record on Shindig! in August 1965. The B-side "Hurt Is All You Gave Me" received a 4 star rating from Billboard. Both songs appeared on the compilation album The Soul of Ike & Tina, released on Kent Record in 1966. After the success of "River Deep – Mountain High" overseas, Stateside Records released the record as a single in the UK in October 1966.

A different version of "Good Bye, So Long" later appeared on Ike & Tina Turner's 1970 album Workin' Together. They performed a live version of the song in the 1971 film Taking Off. That year, it was released as a single on BYG Records in France with "It's Crazy Baby" as the B-side track.

== Critical reception ==
The single received positive reviews.

Cash Box (May 22, 1965): "This hard driving rock-R&B number could burn up the charts. Ike and Tina Turner, no strangers to hitsville are already making noise with this one."

Evening Post (October 22, 1966): "A standout number from the Ike and Tina review. Exciting lead voice of indeterminate sex, shimmering gospel calls from the Ikettes and a strong fast band backing. The record’s pre-Spector Ike and Tina production, but is commercial enough to sell."

== Track listing ==
All tracks are written by Ike Turner.

| No. | Title | Length |
|---|---|---|
| 1. | "Good Bye, So Long" | 2:17 |
| 2. | "Hurt Is All You Gave Me" | 2:37 |

== Chart performance ==
| Chart (1965) | Peak position |
|---|---|
| US Billboard R&B Singles | 32 |
| US Billboard Bubbling Under Hot 100 | 107 |
| US Cash Box Looking Ahead | 120 |
| US Cash Box Top 50 R&B | 31 |

== Cover versions ==
- Rock group the Inmates recorded a rendition for their 1989 album Fast forward
- Singer-songwriter Chuck E. Weiss released a version on his 2006 album 23rd and Stout
