= Sweet Rhode Island Red (song) =

- German picture sleeve

Single by Ike & Tina Turner

from the album Sweet Rhode Island Red
- B-side: "Get It Out Of Your Mind"
- Released: March 1974
- Recorded: February 1974
- Studio: Bolic Sound
- Genre: Funk rock, R&B
- Length: 3:08
- Label: United Artists
- Songwriter: Tina Turner
- Producer: Ike Turner

Ike & Tina Turner singles chronology
"Nutbush City Limits" (1973)	"Sweet Rhode Island Red" (1974)	"Sexy Ida" (1974)

"Sweet Rhode Island Red" is a song written by Tina Turner and released by R&B duo Ike & Tina Turner on United Artists in 1974. It is the lead single from the album Sweet Rhode Island Red.

== Recording and release ==
"Sweet Rhode Island Red" was recorded at the Turners' studio Bolic Sound in Inglewood, California in February 1974. Tina Turner penned the tune and it was produced by Ike Turner. The single was released the following month as a follow-up to their hit "Nutbush City Limits." "Sweet Rhode Island Red" follows a similar formula as a funk rock guitar driven-song. It did moderately on the charts, reaching No. 43 on the Billboard R&B singles chart, and charting overseas as well.

== Critical reception ==
Cash Box (March 16, 1974):

Ike and Tina follow their hard driving "Nutbush City Limits" with this equally super driving rocker. Not only does Tina do what she does best (and that is most definitely belt), but Ike gets some super licks in on his extra funky guitar. Item should perk up most any programmers playlist and make the disco crowd a very happy lot.

Record World (March 16, 1974): "Even 'Proud Mary' seems pale in comparison to the latest stick of dynamite from this super high-powered duo. Moog soul spiced with tough horns help stir up the story of a most sensual lady into a caldron of caustic chart sauce, pop and soul."

== Track listing ==
No.	Title	Writer(s)	Length
1.	"Sweet Rhode Island Red"	Tina Turner	3:03
2.	"Get It Out Of Your Mind"	Ike Turner	3:24

== Charts ==
Chart (1974)	Peak position
Germany (Official German Charts)	43
UK Singles (Official Charts Company)	51
US Billboard Hot Soul Singles	43
US Billboard Bubbling Under Hot 100	106
US Cash Box Looking Ahead	109
US Record World R&B Singles	71
US Record World Singles	121
