= I Can't Believe What You Say (for Seeing What You Do) =

Single by Ike & Tina Turner
- B-side: "My Baby Now"
- Released: September 1964
- Recorded: 1964
- Length: 2:00
- Label: Kent
- Songwriter: Ike Turner
- Producer: Ike Turner

Ike & Tina Turner singles chronology
"Strange" (1964)	"I Can't Believe What You Say" (1964)	"Please, Please, Please" (1964)

"I Can't Believe What You Say (For Seeing What You Do)" is a song written by Ike Turner. It was originally released by Ike & Tina Turner on Kent Records in 1964.

== Release ==
"I Can't Believe What You Say (For Seeing What You Do)" was written and produced by Ike Turner. It was released as a non-album track on Kent Records in September 1964. The single reached No. 95 on the Billboard Hot 100 and No. 33 on the Record World R&B chart. It was the best-selling R&B record for Kent in 1965. Tina Turner performed the song on Shindig! in August 1965. A different version of the song appeared on Ike & Tina Turner's album Get It – Get It, which was remixed and reissued as Her Man…His Woman in 1971. Ike Turner released another version on the album The Edge in 1980.

== Critical reception ==
The single was selected for Cash Box magazine's Pick of the Week.

Cash Box (October 10, 1964): "This Kent outing for Ike & Tina Turner is already stirring up a heap of attention. Tagged I Can’t Believe What You Say, it’s a high-speed handclapping twister that sports a host of ultra-commercial vocal and instrumental sounds. Watch it. Backing's a soul-filled shuflle-rock blueser that Tina wails with loads of feeling."

== Cover versions ==
- 1965: British singer Val McKenna released a rendition on Piccadilly Records in the UK
- 1965: New Zealand singer Dinah Lee released a cover version with Max Merritt & The Meteors as her backing band
- 1966: Manfred Mann recorded a version for the EP As Was, released concurrently with the album As Is.
- 1967: Danish rock group The Defenders released the song as a single on Sonet Records from their album Looking at You
- 1972: Toots and The Maytals released a version on their album Funky Kingston
- 2000: Henning Stærk released the song on his album Hit House

== Chart performance ==
Chart (1964)	Peak position
US Billboard Hot 100	95
US Cash Box Looking Ahead	134
US Record World Top 40 R&B	33
