= Airwaves (Ike & Tina Turner album) =

Compilation album by Ike & Tina Turner
- Released: 1978
- Label: United Artists
- Producer: Ike Turner

Ike & Tina Turner chronology
Delilah's Power (1977)	Airwaves (1978)	The Edge (1980)

Professional ratings
Review scores
Source	Rating
AllMusic	3/5 stars
The Virgin Encyclopedia of R&B and Soul	2/5 stars

Airwaves is a compilation album by Ike & Tina Turner, released on United Artists Records in 1978, the year their divorce was finalized. It features previously unreleased recordings and alternative versions of non-album tracks that the duo released in the 1960s, including the first single credited to Tina Turner, "Too Many Ties That Bind." The album was reissued by BGO Records on the compilation CD Delilah's Power/Airwaves in 2011.

== Track listing ==
Side A
No.	Title	Writer(s)	Length
1.	"Too Many Ties That Bind"	Ike Turner, J.R. Bailey, Johnny Northern	2:25
2.	"Strange"	Billy Preston, Ike Turner	3:01
3.	"He Don't Love You"	Ike Turner	2:32
4.	"Flee Flee Fla"	Ike Turner	2:19
5.	"Honey Child Baby"	Ike Turner	1:52

Side B
No.	Title	Writer(s)	Length
1.	"Just Want Your Love Sometime"	Ike Turner	3:14
2.	"We Need an Understanding"	Ike Turner, J.R. Bailey, Johnny Northern	2:03
3.	"Two Is a Couple"	Ike Turner	2:21
4.	"It's My Time Now"	Ike Turner	3:28
5.	"Dear John"	Ike Turner	2:27
