= Sweet Rhode Island Red =

Studio album by Ike & Tina Turner
- Released: October 1974
- Recorded: February – June 1974
- Studio: Bolic Sound (Inglewood, California)
- Genre: Rock; soul
- Label: United Artists
- Producer: Ike Turner; Claude Williams; Warren Dawson; Soko Richardson; Gerhard Augustin

Ike & Tina Turner chronology
The Gospel According to Ike & Tina (1974)	Sweet Rhode Island Red (1974)	Greatest Hits (1976)

Singles from Sweet Rhode Island Red
- 1. "Sweet Rhode Island Red" Released: February 1974; 2. "Sexy Ida" Released: August 1974

Sweet Rhode Island Red is a studio album by Ike & Tina Turner, released on United Artist Records in 1974. The album was created exclusively for the international market. It was available in the US through the Columbia Record Club. The album charted at No. 41 in Australia.

== Recording and content ==
Sweet Rhode Island Red was recorded at the Ike & Tina Turner's Bolic Sound studio. A majority of the songs from the album were written by Tina Turner, including the title track which was released as a single in February 1974. "Sweet Rhode Island Red" peaked at No. 43 on the Billboard R&B chart, No. 43 in Germany, No. 17 in Italy and No. 51 on the UK Singles Chart.

The follow-up single "Sexy Ida" was released in two versions: the funk rhythmic A-side, "Sexy Ida (Part 1)", and the up-temp B-side, "Sexy Ida (Part 2)". "Sexy Ida (Part 1)" reached No. 29 on Billboard R&B chart and No. 65 on the Billboard Hot 100. In Europe it peaked at No. 51 on the UK Singles Chart and No. 35 in Italy. "Sexy Ida (Part 2)" features rock musician Marc Bolan on guitar. It peaked at No. 85 on the Hot 100 and No. 9 on the R&B chart. Both songs were included on the album in the Netherlands, Germany and Italy.

== Critical reception ==
Professional ratings
Review scores
Source	Rating
AllMusic	3.5/5 stars

Sidney Nelson wrote for the Evening Post (November 8, 1974):

'Sweet Rhode Island Red' finds Ike and Tina Turner producing their high-octane rock-blues-soul combination with Tina breaking into her famous scream at regular, spine-chilling intervals. Strangely, however, it is when she purrs her way through Stevie Wonder's 'Living for the City', holding the power back that she really scores on this album. The opener 'Let Me Be There' is fine but for the rest, even Tina's dynamic delivery cannot raise mediocre material.

== Reissues ==
Sweet Rhode Island Red was digitally remastered and released by BGO Records in 2012 on the compilation CD Sweet Rhode Island Red/The Gospel According To Ike & Tina.

== Track listing ==
Side A
No.	Title	Writer(s)	Length
1.	"Let Me Be There"	John Rostill	3:22
2.	"Living for the City"	Stevie Wonder	3:40
3.	"I Know"	Barbara George	3:17
4.	"Mississippi Rolling Stone"	Don Goodman, Troy Seals	3:02
5.	"Sugar Hill"	Tina Turner	3:07
6.	"Sexy Ida (Part 1)" (Included in select countries)	Tina Turner	2:30

Side B
No.	Title	Writer(s)	Length
1.	"Sweet Rhode Island Red"	Tina Turner	3:06
2.	"Ready for You Baby"	Tina Turner	3:11
3.	"Smooth Out the Wrinkles"	Tina Turner	3:45
4.	"Doozie"	Tina Turner	2:50
5.	"Higher Ground"	Stevie Wonder	3:40
6.	"Sexy Ida (Part 2)" (Included in select countries)	Tina Turner	3:03

== Chart performance ==
Chart performance for Sweet Rhode Island Red
Chart (1975)	Peak position
Australian Albums (Kent Music Report)	41
