= Soul to Soul (soundtrack) =

Soul To Soul

Soundtrack album by Various
- Released: September 1971
- Recorded: March 6, 1971
- Venues: Black Star Square, Accra, Ghana
- Genres: Soul, R&B
- Label: Atlantic Records
- Producer: Tom Dowd

Singles from Soul to Soul
- 1. "Soul to Soul" Released: July 1971

Soul To Soul (Music From The Original Soundtrack - Recorded Live In Ghana, West Africa) is the soundtrack to the concert film Soul to Soul released on Atlantic Records in 1971.

The concert was held for Ghana's 14th Independence Day on March 6, 1971 at the Black Star Square in Accra. It featured an array of performers including Ike & Tina Turner, Wilson Pickett, Santana, Roberta Flack, and The Staple Singers. The concert was later released in theaters in August 1971, and select performances were compiled for the soundtrack album. The album peaked at number 10 on the Billboard Soul LP's chart in 1971.

== Critical reception ==
Billboard (September 18, 1971):

Soul luminaries Roberta Flack, Eddie Harris & Les McCann, Wilson Pickett, Staple Singers, Ike & Tina Turner and the Voices of East Harlem jetted to Accra, Ghana last March 6 where 100,000 West Africans celebrated Ghana's 14th Independence Day with an all-night concert which became the basis for the hit film and now album. Ike & Tina Turner warm things up for Pickett's electrifying "Funky Broadway."

== Track listing ==
Side A
No.	Title	Writer(s)	Length
1.	"Soul To Soul" (Ike & Tina Turner)	Bob Burchman, Neil Seidel	2:45
2.	"Run Shaker Life" (The Voices Of East Harlem)	Richie Havens	3:20
3.	"Heyjorler" (Eddie Harris & Les McCann with Amoa Azangio)	Eddie Harris, Les McCann	6:41
4.	"Freedom Song" (Roberta Flack)	Trad. Arr. Roberta Flack	2:57
5.	"Tryin' Times" (Roberta Flack)	Donny Hathaway, Leroy Hutson	5:15

Side B
No.	Title	Writer(s)	Length
1.	"Are You Sure/He's Alright" (The Staple Singers)	Ike Cargill/Roebuck Staples	6:20
2.	"I Smell Trouble" (Ike & Tina Turner)	Don Robey	6:50
3.	"Funky Broadway" (Wilson Pickett)	Arlester Christian	2:25
4.	"Land Of 1000 Dances" (Wilson Pickett)	Chris Kenner, Fats Domino	3:15
5.	"Soul To Soul" (The Voices of East Harlem)	Bob Burchman, Neil Seidel	2:07

== Chart performance ==
Chart (1971)	Peak position
Billboard Soul LP's	10
Record World Albums	54
Record World R&B	8
