= Sexy Ida =

"Sexy Ida (Part 1)"
- French picture sleeve

Single by Ike & Tina Turner

from the album Sweet Rhode Island Red
- B-side: "Sexy Ida (Part 2)"
- Released: August 1974
- Recorded: June 1974, Bolic Sound, Inglewood, CA
- Genre: Funk rock, soul
- Length: 2:30
- Label: United Artists
- Songwriter: Tina Turner
- Producers: Ike Turner, Claude Williams, Gerhard Augustin

Ike & Tina Turner singles chronology
"Sweet Rhode Island Red" (1974)	"Sexy Ida (Part 1)" (1974)	"Baby, Get It On" (1975)

"Sexy Ida" is a single released by R&B duo Ike & Tina Turner on United Artists Records in August 1974. It features two versions, the A-side "Sexy Ida (Part 1)" and the B-side "Sexy Ida (Part 2)."

== Overview ==
"Sexy Ida" was written by Tina Turner; produced by Ike Turner, Claude Williams, and Gerhard Augustin. It was recorded at the Turners' studio Bolic Sound in June 1974. Similar to their hit single "Nutbush City Limits," Part 1 is characterized by inventive guitar sounds, a substantial synthesizer solo, and a funky brass section. Part 2 is a faster tempo and features T. Rex guitarist Marc Bolan.

"Sexy Ida (Part 1)" peaked at No. 51 in the UK, and was a hit in several other European countries. It is one of the duo's final chart hits, reaching No. 29 on Billboard Hot Soul Singles and No. 65 on the Billboard Hot 100. "Sexy Ida (Part 2)" peaked at No. 85 on the Hot 100 and No. 49 on the Soul Singles chart. It also reached No. 67 on the Cash Box Top 100 Singles chart.

Part 1 and 2 are included on the album Sweet Rhode Island Red in select European countries, including the Netherlands, Germany, and Italy.

== Critical reception ==
Professional ratings
Review scores
Source	Rating
Blues & Soul	5/5 stars

Billboard selected "Sexy Ida (Part 2)" as one of their Top Singles Picks.

Cash Box wrote of the B-side: "This powerhouse duo does it again!! An incredibly strong disk it could make it as a disco record. Ike and Tina can really sock it out and this record is where they really cut loose. Solidly based heavy beat is cut through with Tina's outrageous vocal. Tight instrumentally and great vocally this record cannot miss the top."

Blues & Soul (October 8, 1974): "Every now and then Ike and Tina burst through with a giant. Last time around, it was 'Nutbush City Limits' and then followed a couple of duds. Now Tina shrieks her way through a bubbling disco item that is virtually assured of both pop and soul victory in this country."

== Track listing ==
No.	Title	Writer(s)	Length
1.	"Sexy Ida (Part 1)"	Tina Turner	2:30
2.	"Sexy Ida (Part 2)"	Tina Turner	3:03

== Chart performance ==
Part 1
Chart (1974)	Peak position
US Billboard Hot Soul Singles	29
US Billboard Hot 100	65
US Cash Box R&B Top 70	33
US Record World Singles	62
US Record World R&B Singles	33
UK Singles Chart	51
Italy (Hit Parade Italia)	25

Part 2
Chart (1974–75)	Peak position
US Billboard Hot Soul Singles	49
US Billboard Hot 100	85
US Record World R&B Singles	46
US Record World Singles	94
US Cash Box Top 100	67
