= Feel Good (Ike & Tina Turner album) =

Studio album by Ike & Tina Turner
- Released: July 1972
- Studio: Bolic Sound (Inglewood, California)
- Genre: Funk; soul; rock and roll
- Label: United Artists
- Producer: Ike Turner, Gerhard Augustin

Ike & Tina Turner chronology
| 'Nuff Said (1971) | Feel Good (1972) | Let Me Touch Your Mind (1973) |

Singles from Feel Good
- 1. "Feel Good" Released: March 1972; 2. "She Came In Through the Bathroom Window" Released: 1972

Feel Good is a studio album by Ike & Tina Turner. It was released on United Artists Records in 1972.

== Recording and release ==
Feel Good showcases Ike & Tina Turner's signature style of rock-infused soul with a mix of early funk. The album contains one cover song, "She Came In Through The Bathroom Window" by the Beatles, the rest of the tracks are written by Tina Turner. The album was recorded at the Turners' Bolic Sound studio. It was produced by Ike Turner and Gerhard Augustin. The album peaked at No. 160 on Billboard's Top LP's chart. It reached No. 27 on the Soul LP's chart before the chart was absorbed into the Top LP's chart.

The title track "Feel Good" was released as the lead single in April 1972. The Turners promoted the single on Soul Train that month. It reached No. 48 on the Cash Box R&B chart and No. 95 on Record World's Singles chart. The second single "She Came In Through The Bathroom Window," was released in the Netherlands while Ike & Tina Turner were on tour in Europe. They performed the song on Rollin' on the River.

== Critical reception ==
Professional ratings
Review scores
| Source | Rating |
|---|---|
| AllMusic | 4.5/5 stars |
| Christgau's Record Guide | B− |

The album received positive reviews. Gene Sculatti wrote for The Sacramento Bee that the "album is noteworthy in its showcasing of Tina's increasingly songwriting talents."

Record World (July 8, 1972): "With the release of this album, Tina Turner is now fully confirmed as a first class writer. Ms. Dynamite has penned all tunes save for the Lennon-McCartney 'She Came In Through the Bathroom Window.' Title track should have done better as a single."

Billboard (July 15, 1972):

The Turners have another top flight album here especially in the driving numbers, such as "If You Can Hully Gully (l Can Hully Gully Too)" and Lennon-McCartney's "She Came in Through the Bathroom Window." Nine of 10 tunes are Tina's own compositions. Other cuts by this always exciting act include "Bolic," "You Better Think of Something," "Black Coffee" and the title single.

== Reissues ==
Feel Good was reissued by Raven Records on the compilation CD Nutbush City Limits/Feel Good in 2006.

== Track listing ==
Side A
| No. | Title | Writer(s) | Length |
|---|---|---|---|
| 1. | "Chopper" | Tina Turner | 2:36 |
| 2. | "Kay Got Laid (Joe Got Paid)" | Tina Turner | 2:59 |
| 3. | "Feel Good" | Tina Turner, Jesse G. James | 3:25 |
| 4. | "I Like It" | Tina Turner | 1:58 |
| 5. | "If You Can Hully Gully (I Can Hully Gully Too)" | Tina Turner | 3:30 |

Side B
| No. | Title | Writer(s) | Length |
|---|---|---|---|
| 1. | "Black Coffee" | Tina Turner | 2:42 |
| 2. | "She Came In Through the Bathroom Window" | Lennon-McCartney | 2:32 |
| 3. | "If I Knew Then (What I Know Now)" | Tina Turner | 2:47 |
| 4. | "You Better Think of Something" | Tina Turner | 3:20 |
| 5. | "Bolic" | Tina Turner | 2:28 |
| Total length: | | | 28:41 |

== Personnel ==
- Arranger – Ike Turner, Claude Williams
- Producer – Ike Turner, Gerhard Augustin
- Engineer – Ike Turner, Barry Keene, Jim Saunders
- Art Direction – Norman Seeff
- Cover Design – Paul Bruhwiler
- Cover Photography – Bill King
- Back Cover Photography – Norman Seeff

== Chart performance ==
| Chart (1972) | Peak position |
|---|---|
| US Billboard Top LP's & Tapes | 160 |
| US Billboard Top Soul LP's (Note: Top Soul LP's chart was discontinued from August 26, 1972 to October 7, 1972.) | 28 |
| US Cash Box Top 100 Albums 101–150 | 144 |
| US Record World R&B Albums | 37 |
