= I Smell Trouble =

"I Smell Trouble" was a 1957 single for Bobby Blue Bland which was a hit for him. It was also a 1964 single for Little Johnny Taylor which became a hit.

== Overview ==
"I Smell Trouble" was a 1957 song written by Don Robey. It was registered in January 1957.

== Bobby Bland version ==
"I Smell Trouble"

Song by Bobby Blue Bland Bill Harvey Orhestra
- A-side: "I Smell Trouble"
- B-side: "Don't Want No Woman"
- Released: 1957
- Length: 2:33
- Label: Duke 167
- Songwriter: Robey

=== Background ===
It was reported in the 23 March 1957 issue of The Cash Box that Bobby Bland's "I Smell Trouble" was "Zooming like a comet". According to composer Robey, the B side, "Don’t Want No Woman" was just as good and the DJs had a two-sider to work on. According to the 13 April issue of The Cash Box, Robey was pleased with the money that "I Smell Trouble" was making.

=== Reception ===
The record was reviewed in the 16 March 1967 issue of The Billboard. The reviewer noted the style of Bobby Bland coming across, saying that his "clear-toned, florid wailing style rarely has come across with more poignant effect". The well recorded backing which the reviewer called "down home" was also noted.

When the record was released, it had an immediate sales reaction.

=== Charts ===
For the week of 20 April 1957, "I Smell Trouble was at no. 10 on the Cash Box Hot, Chicago chart, and no. 1 in Memphis chart. It had also debuted at no. 20 in The Nation's R&B Top 20 chart. Also that week, "Don't Want No Woman" was a "Territorial Tip", one of the chart highlights Rhythm and Blues records that showed regional action but hadn't yet reached the Top 20. It was also at no. 9 on the Cash Box Hot, Dallas chart. "I Smell Trouble" peaked at no. 14 on The Cash Box The Nation's Top 20 for the week of 27 April.

== Little Johhny Taylor version ==
"I Smell Trouble"

Song by Little Johnny Taylor
- A-side: "I Smell Trouble"
- B-side: "True Love"
- Released: 1964
- Label: Galaxy 733
- Composer: Robey
- Producer: Cliff Goldsmith

=== Charts ===
For the week of 17 October 1964, Little Johnny Taylor's version of "I Smell Trouble" debuted at no. 40 in the Record World Top 40 R&B chart. The record was at no. 37 for the week of 7 November.

The record also got to no. 41 on the Billboard R&B chart.
