= The Greatest Hits of Ike & Tina Turner =

Greatest hits album by Ike & Tina Turner
- Released: March 1965
- Recorded: 1960–1963
- Label: Sue Records

Ike & Tina Turner chronology
Live! The Ike & Tina Turner Show (1965)	The Greatest Hits of Ike & Tina Turner (1965)	Get It – Get It (c. 1966)

The Greatest Hits of Ike & Tina Turner is the first greatest hits album by Ike & Tina Turner, released on Sue Records in 1965. It contains songs from their albums The Soul of Ike & Tina, Dynamite!, Don't Play Me Cheap, and It's Gonna Work Out Fine. One song, "Mind In A Whirl," was a non-album track released as the B-side to the single "The Argument" in 1962.

== Critical reception ==
Professional ratings
Review scores
Source	Rating
Record Mirror	3/5 stars

Cash Box (March 20, 1965):

The earthy, driving sound of Ike and Tina Turner should draw their r&b fans in droves to this package of the duo's biggest hit numbers. The veteran team delivers a song with the same dynamic drive that has built up an enormous following over the years, including the rockin' "Tra La La" and "It's Gonna Work Out Fine" and the soulful "You Should've Treated Me Right." This package should get a great deal of acceptance from the r&b audience.

== Reissues ==
Ten tracks were reissued as Ike & Tina's Greatest Hits on Unart Records in 1967 and Sunset Records in 1970. The missing tracks are "I'm Jealous" and "Don't Play Me Cheap."

== Track listing ==
All tracks written by Ike Turner, except where indicated.

Side A
No.	Title	Writer(s)	Length
1.	"A Fool In Love"		2:31
2.	"Poor Fool"		2:29
3.	"Tra La La"		2:28
4.	"I'm Jealous"	Ike Turner, Jane Bussong	2:12
5.	"Mojo Queen"		2:11
6.	"Good Good Lovin'"		2:24

Side B
No.	Title	Length
1.	"It's Gonna Work Out Fine"	2:30
2.	"You Should've Treated Me Right"	2:27
3.	"Don't Play Me Cheap"	2:07
4.	"Mind In A Whirl"	2:11
5.	"I Idolize You"	2:26
6.	"Letter From Tina"	2:29
