= Proud Mary: The Best of Ike & Tina Turner =

Greatest hits album by Ike & Tina Turner
- Released: March 18, 1991
- Recorded: 1960–1975
- Genre: Southern soul; rock
- Length: 71:11
- Label: EMI
- Producer: Ike Turner, Claude Williams, Gerhard Augustin, Juggy Murray, Denny Diante, Spencer Proffer, Ron Furmanek

Ike & Tina Turner chronology
The Best of Ike & Tina Turner (1991)	Proud Mary: The Best of Ike & Tina Turner (1991)	River Deep Mountain High: 24 Great Soul Hits (1991)

Professional ratings
Review scores
Source	Rating
AllMusic	4.5/5 stars
Christgau's Record Guide	A−
Entertainment Weekly	B−

Proud Mary: The Best of Ike & Tina Turner is a compilation album released as part of EMI's Legends Of Rock N' Roll Series in 1991. In 2003, Rolling Stone magazine ranked the album number 212 on their list of the 500 greatest albums of all time (number 214 on 2012 revised list, and number 392 in the 2020 edition).

== Content ==
Proud Mary: The Best of Ike & Tina Turner features some of Ike & Tina's greatest hits from their formation in 1960 until their separation in 1976. The tracks were previously released on Sue Records, Minit Records, Liberty Records, and United Artists Records. Due to license issues, the version of "River Deep, Mountain High" on the album is not the original wall of sound production by Phil Spector, but has no further details on the date of recording. Included are two additional and hidden tracks, which are radio promotions for the album Come Together.

== Critical reception ==
Reviewing Proud Mary: The Best of Ike & Tina Turner for Entertainment Weekly, Ira Robbins wrote:

Long before she became a household name in the '80s, Tina Turner earned her place in the Rock and Roll Hall of Fame as an incendiary rhythm & blues belter, the riveting centerpiece of her husband Ike's kinetic soul revue. This limited compilation of the Turners' career begins with their first seven singles together — gutsy Southern soul stirrers recorded between 1960 and 1962 — then leaps to 1970, when the duo cannily began targeting the rock audience with idiosyncratic interpretations of the Beatles' "Come Together" and Creedence Clearwater’s "Proud Mary." Al Quaglieri's exemplary liner notes provide fascinating background and insight, but Proud Mary: The Best of Ike and Tina Turner still isn't a first-rate retrospective. If nothing else, the inclusion of a modest remake of "River Deep, Mountain High" instead of the monumental version produced by Phil Spector, makes Proud Mary a compromise rather than a victory.

== Personnel ==
- Ike Turner – vocals, guitar, bass
- Tina Turner – vocals
- The Ikettes – backing vocalists
- Ike Turner (tracks: 1 to 15, 17 to 22), Juggy Murray (tracks: 1 to 3, 5 to 7), Claude Williams (tracks: 19 to 21), Gerhard Augustin (tracks: 16, 20, 21), Denny Diante (tracks 22 & 23), Spencer Proffer (tracks 22 & 23) – original producers
- Ron Furmanek – compilation producer

== Track listing ==
No.	Title	Writer(s)	Original release	Length
1.	"A Fool in Love"	Ike Turner	The Soul of Ike & Tina Turner (1961)	2:51
2.	"I Idolize You"	Ike Turner	The Soul of Ike & Tina Turner (1961)	2:49
3.	"I'm Jealous"	Ike Turner, Jane Bossung	The Soul of Ike & Tina Turner (1961)	2:11
4.	"It's Gonna Work Out Fine"	Joe Seneca, Rose Marie McCoy	Dynamite! (1962)	3:01
5.	"Poor Fool"	Ike Turner	Dynamite! (1962)	2:32
6.	"Tra La La La La"	Ike Turner	Dynamite! (1962)	2:38
7.	"You Should'a Treated Me Right"	Ike Turner	Dynamite! (1962)	3:37
8.	"Come Together"	Lennon-McCartney	Come Together (1970)	3:39
9.	"Honky Tonk Women"	Mick Jagger, Keith Richards	Come Together (1970)	3:08
10.	"I Want to Take You Higher"	Sly Stone	Come Together (1970)	2:52
11.	"Workin' Together"	Ike Turner	Workin' Together (1970)	3:31
12.	"Proud Mary"	John Fogerty	Workin' Together (1970)	4:57
13.	"Funkier Than a Mosquito's Tweeter"	Alline Bullock	Workin' Together (1970)	2:33
14.	"Ooh Poo Pah Doo"	Jessie Hill	Workin' Together (1970)	3:34
15.	"I'm Yours (Use Me Anyway You Wanna)"	Philip Reese, Calvin Lane	Non-album single (1971)	2:50
16.	"Up in Heah"	Tina Turner, Leon Ware	Non-album single (1972)	3:03
17.	"River Deep, Mountain High"	Phil Spector, Jeff Barry, Ellie Greenwich	unknown	3:28
18.	"Nutbush City Limits"	Tina Turner	Nutbush City Limits (1973)	2:58
19.	"Sweet Rhode Island Red"	Tina Turner	Sweet Rhode Island Red (1974)	3:15
20.	"Sexy Ida (Part 1)"	Tina Turner	Sweet Rhode Island Red (1974)	2:29
21.	"Sexy Ida (Part 2)"	Tina Turner	Sweet Rhode Island Red (1974)	3:01
22.	"Baby, Get It On"	Ike Turner	Acid Queen (1975)	3:10
23.	"Acid Queen"	Pete Townshend	Tommy (1975)	2:59
