= Dave Dixon (DJ) =

American radio DJ and promoter (1926–1964)

Dave Dixon (August 26, 1926 – September 19, 1964) was an American DJ and program director at the St. Louis radio station KATZ. In addition to being a local producer and promoter of live music shows, Dixon was also the president of the National Association of Radio Broadcasters (NARA).

== Career ==
David Bernard Dixon was a native of St. Louis, Missouri. In 1951, he began working at WTMV. He later had a radio show that aired live from the Birdcage Lounge on KSTL. He started working at KATZ as a disc jockey in 1958. He became the host of KATZ's "Night Beat Down Rhythm Street," which originated from various lounges in the St. Louis area.

Dixon was the first African-American vice president of Laclede Broadcasting. He was also the first African-American promoter for Regal Sports, a concert and sports production agency.

In 1960, Dixon heard a demo that local bandleader Ike Turner had recorded with his vocalist Ann Bullock (soon to be Tina Turner). Dixon urged Turner to send the demo to Juggy Murray, president of R&B label Sue Records. The song, "A Fool In Love," became a national hit and launched the career of Ike & Tina Turner.

In 1962, Dixon began serving as president of National Association of Radio Broadcasters(NARA), the African-American organization of television and radio announcers.

Dixon was involved in a head-on auto collision on August 28, 1964. While he was in critical condition at Homer Phillips Hospital in St. Louis, a Dave Dixon Hospital Fund was set up. Another passenger in the car was also seriously injured. Dixon died from his injures on September 19, 1964. He was 38. After Dixon's death, his brother Jerome Dixon took over his position at KATZ.

In June 1965, a musical memorial tribute to Dixon was held at Kiel Auditorium in St. Louis. The show was sponsored by NARA and featured musical acts such as the Miracles, King Curtis, Grover Mitchell, and Mary Love.
