= It's Gonna Work Out Fine (album) =

Studio album by Ike & Tina Turner
- Released: June 1963
- Recorded: 1961–1962
- Genre: R&B
- Label: Sue
- Producer: Juggy Murray

Ike & Tina Turner chronology
Don't Play Me Cheap (1963)	It's Gonna Work Out Fine (1963)	Ike & Tina Turner Revue Live (1964)

Singles from It's Gonna Work Out Fine
- 1. "It's Gonna Work Out Fine" Released: June 1961; 2. "Poor Fool" Released: November 1961

It's Gonna Work Out Fine is a studio album released by Ike & Tina Turner on Sue Records in June 1963.

== Content and release ==
It is their fourth album on the Sue label and the fifth associated with Ike and Tina, including the instrumental album Dance with Ike & Tina Turner's Kings of Rhythm. Ike Turner played guitar and piano on the album, which was produced by Juggy Murray.

The title track and "Poor Fool" were hit singles in 1961, and both were released on the 1962 album Dynamite!. The record "It's Gonna Work Out Fine" earned Ike & Tina Turner their first Grammy nomination.

== Critical reception ==
Professional ratings
Review scores
Source	Rating
AllMusic	4/5 stars

The album received positive reviews.

Cash Box (August 3, 1963):

Ike & Tina Turner tag this new LP romp on Sue after a while-back hit called, 'It's Gonna Work Out Fine', and include eleven other r&b biggies of recent vintage. Most of the tunes here are up-tempo and the duo belts them out with unabashed good spirits. Jumping off with 'Gonna Find Me a Substitute', "the pair also includes 'Poor Fool' and 'I'm Gonna Cut You Loose'. The package looms as a moneymaker in the r&b markets.

Reviewing the album for AllMusic, Stephen Thomas Erlewine wrote: "This period of their discography is marked by burning early R&B fused with the same fireball energy of the also quickly developing rock & roll culture. Things slow down only slightly with the soulful title track and the swanky 'Why Should I', but the energy is on ten for most of the set."

== Track listing ==
All songs written by Ike Turner, except where noted.

Side A
No.	Title	Writer(s)	Length
1.	"Gonna Find Me a Substitute"		2:41
2.	"Mojo Queen"		2:06
3.	"Kinda Strange"		2:44
4.	"Why Should I"		1:29
5.	"Tinaroo"		2:27
6.	"It's Gonna Work Out Fine"	Sylvia McKinney, Rose Marie McCoy (uncredited)	3:02

Side B
No.	Title	Length
1.	"I'm Gonna Cut You Loose"	2:35
2.	"Poor Fool"	2:33
3.	"I'm Fallin' in Love"	2:22
4.	"Foolish"	3:47
5.	"This Man's Crazy"	1:49
6.	"Good Good Lovin'"	2:17
