= Poor Fool (disambiguation) =

"Poor Fool" is a 1961 song by Ike & Tina Turner

Poor Fool may also refer to:

- "Poor Fool," a 2017 song by 2 Chainz featuring Swae Lee from Pretty Girls Like Trap Music
- Poor Fool, a character in The Good Earth, a novel by Pearl S. Buck
- Poor Fool, a 1930 novel by Erskine Caldwell
- "Poor Fool, He Makes Me Laugh", an aria from the opera-in-opera Il Muto

== See also ==
- "Poor Little Fool"
- "Poor Misguided Fool"
