= A Fool in Love =

Single by Ike & Tina Turner

from the album The Soul of Ike & Tina Turner
- B-side: "The Way You Love Me"
- Released: July 1960
- Recorded: March 1960
- Studio: Technisonic Studios (St. Louis, Missouri)
- Genre: R&B; pop; blues; gospel
- Length: 2:30
- Label: Sue Records
- Songwriter: Ike Turner
- Producer: Ike Turner

Ike & Tina Turner singles chronology
"A Fool in Love" (1960)	"A Fool Too Long" (1960)

"A Fool in Love" is the debut single by Ike & Tina Turner. It was released on Sue Records in 1960. The song is Tina Turner's first release with the stage name "Tina Turner" although she had been singing with Ike Turner and his Kings of Rhythm since 1956. It was the first national hit record for bandleader Ike Turner since the number-one R&B hit "Rocket 88" in 1951, for which he did not receive proper credit.

"A Fool In Love" is one of the first R&B recordings to successfully cross over to the pop charts and became a million-seller. Music journalist Kurt Loder deemed it "the blackest record to creep into the white pop charts since Ray Charles's gospel-styled 'What'd I Say.'"

== Background ==
In 1956, Ike Turner and his Kings of Rhythm had a reputation as one of the liveliest bands in the St. Louis and East St. Louis club scenes. Ann Bullock from Brownsville, Tennessee caught the band's act at the predominantly black East St. Louis club, Club Manhattan, with her sister Alline Bullock. After witnessing Turner perform, she tried several times to get his attention so that she could get on stage with him and the band. In 1956, 17-year-old Bullock finally got her chance when she got hold of the microphone from her sister's boyfriend, drummer Eugene Washington, during an intermission. She sang the B.B. King ballad, "You Know I Love You", while Turner, who played piano on the original version with King, was playing the organ. Stunned by her voice, Turner asked her if she knew other material. By the end of the night, she was given a spot as a vocalist in his band.

Bullock was renamed "Little Ann" by Turner and she tried in vain to become the lead vocalist of the band, but Turner already had a bevy of other singers on his roster. She made her debut on Turner's single, "Boxtop," released on Tune Town Records in 1958. The song also featured vocalist Carlson Oliver and Turner who sang the bass-baritone.

== Recording and release ==
In March 1960, Turner took his band to Technisonic Studios to record a song he had written titled "A Fool in Love" for Art Lassiter. Lassiter's background vocalists Robbie Montgomery, Frances Hodges, and Sandra Harden were known as the Artettes. They were present for the recording session, but Lassiter failed to show up to record the song. Turner recalled that he had lent Lassiter $80 for new tires on his car and he never returned. Bullock, who knew the song from rehearsals, suggested that she sing the song. Turner already paid for the studio time so he decided to record a demo with Bullock and the Artettes. He had intentions of erasing Bullock's vocals in the event that Lassiter returned to record.

After Turner played the record during a gig at Club Imperial in St. Louis, a local disc jockey asked him to send it to Juggy Murray, president of R&B label Sue Records, in New York. Murray was impressed by Bullock's vocals and suggested that Turner keep her vocals on the record. Convinced it was a hit, Murray offered Turner a $20,000 advance for the song. Turner changed Bullock's stage name from "Little Ann" to "Tina Turner," giving her the name of Tina because it rhymed with Sheena, Queen of the Jungle. Paranoid that she would leave him like his previous vocalists, he trademarked the name as a form of protection so that if she left him, he could replace her with another singer.

"A Fool In Love" was released on Sue in July 1960, and soon became the top selling record in St. Louis. On August 15, the single peaked at No. 2 on the Billboard Hot R&B Sides. By fall it had crossed over to the pop charts, peaking at No. 27 on the Billboard Hot 100 on October 17, 1960. The record became the duo's first million-seller and they embarked on a grueling tour of one-nighters to promote the song which included performances at the Apollo Theater in Harlem in New York City. They made their first national TV appearance on American Bandstand, when Bullock was over eight months pregnant, on October 3, 1960.

The song was included on their debut album The Soul of Ike & Tina Turner (1961). Turner produced similar sequels such as "Crazy In Love" (1962) by Robbie Montgomery and the Ikettes, "Wake Up" (1963) from the album Don't Play Me Cheap, and "Am I A Fool In Love" (1964) from the compilation The Soul of Ike & Tina.

== Personnel ==
- Background vocals: The Artettes (Robbie Montgomery, Sandra Harding, and Frances Hodges)
- Bass guitar: Jesse Knight Jr.
- Composer lyricist: Ike Turner
- Drums: T.N.T. Tribble
- Lead vocals: Tina Turner
- Piano: Fred Sample
- Producer: Ike Turner

== Critical reception ==
Professional ratings
Review scores
Source	Rating
Billboard	2/3 stars
Cash Box	B+

Billboard (August 1, 1960): "A bluesy rocker. The chanters use a touch of gospel style in the screaming passages."

Cash Box (August 6, 1960): "Ike Turner and his Kings of Rhythm are stirring instrumental support for Tina's belting blues delivery. An enticing rhythmic with a bright future."

== Reissues ==
"A Fool In Love" was reissued on the album Dynamite (1962). Ike & Tina Turner recorded another version for the album River Deep - Mountain High in 1966. The song was reissued on various compilations, including The Greatest Hits of Ike & Tina Turner (1965), Greatest Hits (1976), Get Back (1985), Proud Mary: The Best of Ike & Tina Turner (1991), and The Ike & Tina Turner Story: 1960–1975 (2007).

Turner would re-record the song herself for the soundtrack of the 1993 biopic What's Love Got to Do With It.

== Chart performance ==
Chart (1960)	Peak position
US Billboard Hot 100	27
US Billboard Hot R&B Sides	2
US Billboard Honor Roll of Hits	27
US Cash Box Top 100	19

== Covers ==
Columbia recording act, Joe South and the Believers recorded a version which was released in 1967.

A live version by Ike & Tina featuring the then current Ikettes was released on the album In Person in 1969.

Tina Turner performed "A Fool In Love" during her early solo tours in the late 1970s. She recorded a rendition of the song for the 1993 soundtrack album What's Love Got to Do with It. She later performed it during her Twenty Four Seven Tour and on the TV show Ally McBeal in 2000.

"A Fool In Love" is an often-covered song on singing competition shows. Contestants Tamyra Gray (2002), Diana DeGarmo (2004), and Fantasia Barrino (2004) performed it on American Idol. It was also performed on The X Factor by Olly Murs (2009) and by Fleur East (2014).
