= You Should'a Treated Me Right =

Single by Ike & Tina Turner

from the album Dynamite!
- B-side: "Sleepless"
- Released: June 1962
- Genre: R&B; pop
- Length: 3:15
- Label: Sue Records
- Songwriter: Ike Turner
- Producer: Ike Turner

Ike & Tina Turner singles chronology
| "Tra La La La La" (1962) | "You Should'a Treated Me Right" (1962) | "Tina's Dilemma" (1962) |

"You Should'a Treated Me Right" is a song written and produced by Ike Turner. It was released by Ike & Tina Turner on Sue Records in June 1962

== Release ==
"You Should'a Treated Me Right" was released as the fourth single from Ike & Tina Turner's album Dynamite! (1962) in June 1962. The song was the follow-up to their R&B hit "Tra La La La La" released in March 1962. "You Should'a Treated Me Right" charted at No. 89 on the Billboard Hot 100 and reached No. 21 on Cash Box's R&B chart. The B-side "Sleepless" is a track from their debut album The Soul of Ike & Tina Turner (1961).

== Critical reception ==
The single was Cash Box magazine's Pick of the Week.

Cash Box (June 23, 1962):

Ike & Tina Turner should soon be represented on the hit lists with this new Sue stand. It's an infectious twist'er, tabbed "You Should'a Treated Me Right," that has Tina brightly belting against a sock femme and Ike Turner-led instrumental support. Another pop-r&b triumph for the artists. Fine beat-ballad blueser on the other end can also score.

Professional ratings
Review scores
| Source | Rating |
|---|---|
| Billboard | 4/4 stars |

== Track listing ==
All tracks are written by Ike Turner.

| No. | Title | Length |
|---|---|---|
| 1. | "You Should'a Treated Me Right" | 3:15 |
| 2. | "Sleepless" | 2:30 |

== Chart performance ==
| Chart (1962) | Peak position |
|---|---|
| US Billboard Hot 100 | 89 |
| US Cash Box Top 50 R&B | 21 |
