= Boxtop (song) =

1958 song by Ike Turner

Single by Ike Turner, Carlson Oliver & Little Ann
- B-side: "Chalypso Love Cry"
- Released: August 1958
- Studio: Ike Turner's home studio, East St. Louis, Illinois
- Genre: Calypso, R&B, Pop
- Length: 2:07
- Label: Tune Town Records
- Songwriter: Ike Turner
- Producer: Ike Turner

"Boxtop" (also known as "Box Top") is a song written and produced by musician Ike Turner. It was originally released as a single in 1958 on Tune Town Records. "Boxtop" is noted for being Tina Turner's first appearance on a record under the name "Little Ann," two years before her debut as Tina Turner on "A Fool In Love" in 1960.

== Background and recording ==
Clarksdale native Ike Turner moved his band the Kings of Rhythm to East St. Louis in 1954. Soon they earned a reputation as one of the liveliest bands in the St. Louis and East St. Louis club scenes. Ann Bullock from Brownsville caught the band's act with her sister Alline Bullock at the Manhattan Club in East St. Louis. In awe of Turner and his band, she tried several times to get his attention to perform with them. In 1957, 17-year-old Bullock finally got her chance when the band's drummer, boyfriend of her sister, Eugene Washington, gave her the microphone during an intermission. She sang the B.B. King ballad, "You Know I Love You," while Turner, who played piano on the original version with King, was playing the organ. Impressed by her voice, Bullock was given a spot as a vocalist in his band.

Bullock was called "Little Ann" by Turner due to her skinny frame. She tried in vain to become his lead vocalist, but he already had plenty of other male vocalists. During this period Bullock was dating the saxophonist in the band, Raymond Hill, and in late 1957 she became pregnant with his child. While pregnant, she recorded "Boxtop" alongside another vocalist in the band, Carlson Oliver, and Turner sang the bass-baritone vocals. It was recorded at Turner's home on Virginia Place in East St. Louis.

"Boxtop" was released as a single on the St. Louis label Tune Town Records in 1958. Tune Town was a label owned by Turner's friend DJ Gabriel (Mitchell Hearns).

Two years after the release, Turner changed Bullock's stage name from "Little Ann" to "Tina Turner" and formed the Ike & Tina Turner Revue.

== Track listing ==
All tracks are written by Ike Turner.

No.	Title	Length
1.	"Boxtop"	2:07
2.	"Chalypso Love Cry"	2:30

== 1959 version ==
"Box Top"

Single by Ike Turner's Kings of Rhythm
- A-side: "Walking Down The Aisle"
- Released: July 1959
- Genre: Calypso, R&B, Pop
- Label: Cobra Records
- Songwriter: Ike Turner
- Producer: Ike Turner

Ike Turner released a different version, "Box Top," with his Kings Of Rhythm in 1959 with lead vocals from himself and Carlson Oliver. It was recorded in Chicago for Cobra Records. This version was released as the B-side to "Walking Down The Aisle."

=== Critical reception ===
Professional ratings
Review scores
Source	Rating
Billboard	2/2 stars

Billboard (July 20, 1959) rated the A-side, "Walking Down The Aisle," 4 stars and gave the B-side 2 stars. Billboard reviewed that "Box Top" had moderate sales potential, noting that it was a "jaunty warbling stint by group on okay r.&r. ditty with Latin tempo."

=== Track listing ===
All tracks are written by Ike Turner.

No.	Title	Length
1.	"Walking Down The Aisle"	1:55
2.	"Box Top"	1:59
