= Golden Empire (Ike & Tina Turner album) =

- 1986 reissue

Compilation album by Ike & Tina Turner
- Released: November 1985
- Genre: R&B
- Label: Striped Horse
- Producer: Ike Turner

Ike & Tina Turner chronology
Get Back (1985)	Golden Empire (1985)	Proud Mary: The Best of Ike & Tina Turner (1991)

Singles from Golden Empire
- 1. "Living For The City" Released: 1985; 2. "Golden Empire" Released: 1985; 3. "Shake A Hand" Released: 1986; 4. "Raise Your Hand (U Got To)" Released: 2005

Golden Empire is a 1985 compilation album of unreleased songs and remixed versions of songs previously released by Ike & Tina Turner. In 1986, it was reissued on CD with 10 additional tracks. All tracks were produced, engineered, and arranged by Ike Turner; remastered and remixed by Striped Horse Records chief Carlo Nasi and Philadelphia International veteran engineer Don Murray. Between 1985 and 2005, a total of four singles were released from the album.

== Content ==
The album contains R&B standards such as "I Know (You Don’t Want Me No More)" and "Shake a Hand." There are also contemporary songs — Stevie Wonder's "Living For The City" which Ike and Tina previously covered for their album Sweet Rhode Island Red, and plenty of Ike Turner originals.

In 1985, the two singles were released by Striped Horse, "Living For The City" and "Golden Empire." The following year when the album was reissued, "Shake A Hand" was released as a single. Twenty years after the album was originally released, the track "Raise Your Hand" was remixed by various DJ's and released as "Raise Your Hand (U Got To)" from different labels in 2005.

== Critical reception ==
People (May 12, 1986):

Ike's original songs are mixed with tightly knit arrangements of R&B standards — "I Know (You Don't Want Me No More)" and "Shake a Hand." Ike's lyrics often are swaggering, especially on the title cut, but Tina sings them with palpable conviction... Tunes such as Ike’s "Bootsie Whitelaw" and Troy Seals and Don Goodman's "Mississippi Rolling Stone" are poignant reminders of Ike's and Tina's productive if sometimes tumultuous years together. They also show that as dynamic as Tina is today, nobody ever got more out of her musically than Ike."

== Track listing ==
All tracks written by Ike Turner, except where noted.

1986
No.	Title	Writer(s)	Length
1.	"Mississippi Rolling Stone"	Don Goodman, Troy Seals	3:38
2.	"Living For The City"	Stevie Wonder	3:40
3.	"Golden Empire"		3:45
4.	"I'm Looking For My Mind"		3:09
5.	"Shake A Hand"	Joe Morris	3:36
6.	"Bootsie Whitelaw"		4:03
7.	"Too Much Man For One Woman"		3:04
8.	"I Know (You Don't Want Me No More)"	Barbara George	3:25
9.	"Rockin' And Rollin'"	William Nobles	3:14
10.	"Never Been To Spain"	Hoyt Axton	2:58
11.	"Sugar, Sugar"	Jeff Barry, Andy Kim	2:42
12.	"Push"		5:05
13.	"Raise Your Hand"	Steve Cropper, Eddie Floyd, Alvertis Isbell	2:30
14.	"Tina's Prayer"		3:02
15.	"Chicken"		3:22
16.	"If You Want It"		2:38
17.	"Let's Get It On"		2:42
18.	"You're Up To Something"		3:52
19.	"You're Still My Baby"	Chuck Willis	2:10
20.	"Jesus"		3:28
