= Technisonic Studios =

- Industry: Recording studio
- Founded: 1929
- Defunct: 2010
- Fate: Closed
- Headquarters: St. Louis, Missouri, U.S.
- Services: Recording; Mastering; Production

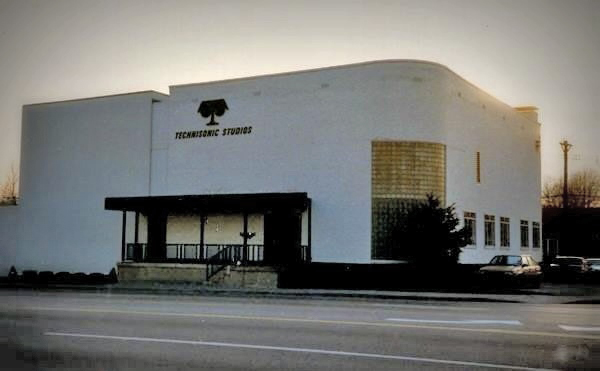
Technisonic Studios - Brentwood Blvd. location

Technisonic Studios was a production company in St Louis, Missouri. Founded in 1929, it was the largest and oldest production facility in St. Louis, used to shoot feature films and television commercials. It contained a recording studio where Ike & Tina Turner cut their first track in 1960, and Chuck Berry recorded there in the 1960s and 1970s.

== History ==
Founded in 1929 by Charles E. "Bud" Harrison as an audio laboratory, Technisonic was originally located in the Central Institute for the Deaf building in mid-town St. Louis. In the early 1940s, it relocated to 1201 S. Brentwood Blvd. in Richmond Heights, MO. Following a series of acquisitions and a brief closure, the Brentwood Blvd. property was sold to a mall developer and Technisonic was moved in 1990 to 500 S. Ewing Ave in St. Louis.

Radio series Mr. Keen, The Lone Ranger and The Green Hornet were recorded off-air at Technisonic for delayed broadcast.

In 1960, musician Ike Turner booked studio time at Technisonic Studios to record "A Fool In Love" with singer Art Lassiter. When Lassiter didn't show up for the session, Turner recorded the song with his backup vocalist Little Ann who he later renamed Tina Turner thus beginning created the Ike & Tina Turner.

After leaving Chess Records, rock and roll musician Chuck Berry recorded his sides for Mercury Records at Technisonic Studios in 1966.

The 2004 documentary The World’s Greatest Fair, about the 1904 Louisiana Purchase Exposition, was produced by Technisonic Studios.

Technisonic Studios closed in 2010.

== List of artists recorded ==
- Ike & Tina Turner
- Larry And The Downbeats
- Roy & The Bristols
- The Marauders
- Chuck Berry
- Bob Kuban & The In-Men

== List of albums recorded ==
- 1961: Davey Bold – A Bold Knight With Davey Bold
- 1961: Ike & Tina Turner – The Soul of Ike & Tina Turner
- 1962: Henry Townsend – Tired Of Bein' Mistreated
- 1966: Bob Kuban & The In-Men - The Cheater
- 1970: Nancy Jent – ....At Last
- 1973: Chuck Berry – Bio
- 1975: Chuck Berry – Chuck Berry
- 1976: Charles Drain – Dependable
- 1977: High Inergy – Turnin' On
- 1979: Vincent Paul & Friends – Paradise
- 1990: Bobby McFerrin – Medicine Music

== List of network radio shows recorded ==
- Mr. Keen, Tracer of Lost Persons
- The Lone Ranger
- The Green Hornet
