= Get Back (Ike & Tina Turner album) =

Greatest hits album by Ike & Tina Turner
- Released: March 1985
- Label: Liberty
- Producer: Ike Turner; Spencer Proffer; Denny Diante

Ike & Tina Turner chronology
Nice 'N' Rough: The Later Greater Hits of Ike & Tina & The Ikettes (1984)	Get Back (1985)	Golden Empire (1985)

Get Back is a compilation album of Ike & Tina Turner's hits songs released by Liberty Records in March 1985.

== Content and release ==
The album features songs the duo released as singles with the exception of "Let's Spend the Night Together" by the Rolling Stones which was released on Tina Turner's 1975 solo album Acid Queen.

Get Back was released nearly a year after Tina's critically acclaimed Private Dancer album. It reached at number 189 on the Billboard Top Pop Albums chart.

== Critical reception ==
Cash Box (April 6, 1985):

In the wake of Tina Turner's massive comeback success, this reissue of the duo's greatest hits should do well. Includes "Proud Mary," "River Deep, Mountain High" and "Nutbush City Limits."

== Track listing ==
Side A
No.	Title	Writer(s)	Length
1.	"Proud Mary"	John Fogerty	4:57
2.	"I Want To Take You Higher" (Ike & Tina Turner and The Ikettes)	Sly Stone	3:45
3.	"Nutbush City Limits"	Tina Turner	2:55
4.	"A Fool In Love"	Ike Turner	2:51
5.	"Let's Spend the Night Together" (Tina Turner)	Mick Jagger, Keith Richards	2:53

Side B
No.	Title	Writer(s)	Length
1.	"River Deep – Mountain High"	Phil Spector, Jeff Barry, Ellie Greenwich	4:02
2.	"Honky Tonk Women" (Ike & Tina Turner and The Ikettes)	Mick Jagger, Keith Richards	3:10
3.	"Ooh Poo Pah Doo"	Jessie Hill	2:48
4.	"Baby, Get It On"	Ike Turner	3:14
5.	"Get Back"	Lennon–McCartney	3:05

== Chart performance ==
Chart (1985)	Peak position
US Billboard Top Pop Albums	189
