= Inez and Charlie Foxx =

American R&B and soul duo

Inez & Charlie Foxx
- Origin: Greensboro, North Carolina, United States
- Genres: Pop, soul
- Years active: 1963–1971 (as duo)
- Labels: Symbol, Musicor, Dynamo, Volt, United Artists, Stateside
- Past members: Inez Foxx; Charlie Foxx

Inez Foxx
- Born: Inez Rebecca Fox; September 9, 1937; Greensboro, North Carolina, U.S.
- Died: August 25, 2022 (aged 84); Los Angeles, California, U.S.
- Other names: Inez Johnston

Charlie Foxx
- Born: Charlie James Fox; October 23, 1933; Greensboro, North Carolina, U.S.
- Died: September 18, 1998 (aged 64); Mobile, Alabama, U.S.

Inez Foxx (September 9, 1937 – August 25, 2022) and her elder brother Charlie Foxx (October 23, 1933 – September 18, 1998) were an American rhythm and blues and soul duo from Greensboro, North Carolina. Inez sang lead vocal, while Charlie sang backing vocals and played guitar. Casey Kasem, and doubtless many others, mistakenly thought that the two were husband and wife.

== Biography ==
Both children were born in Greensboro to John and Peggy Fox. According to published information in the North Carolina Birth Index, and the U.S. census, Charlie James Fox was born in 1933 and Inez Rebecca Fox in 1937, though subsequent publicity indicated later birth years for both siblings. They changed their professional names to Foxx with a double 'x'.

Charlie Foxx began singing with a gospel choir as a child in the early 1950s, and was later joined by his sister Inez. In 1960, Inez traveled to New York City and recorded for Brunswick Records using her then-married name Inez Johnston, but with little success. In early 1963, the pair introduced themselves to Henry 'Juggy' Murray, the owner of Sue Records, and sang him their arrangement of the traditional lullaby "Hush, Little Baby". The song, re-titled "Mockingbird," was released on Sue's subsidiary label Symbol Records in June 1963. The single reached the top 10 on both the US rhythm and blues and pop charts. It was their most successful record, selling over one million copies, and was awarded a gold disc by the RIAA. It was later covered by artists including Aretha Franklin, James Taylor and Carly Simon, Dusty Springfield, Etta James with Taj Mahal and Toby Keith.

The record company, keen to promote Inez Foxx as a solo singer, issued later recordings under her name alone, despite the presence of two voices on the records. Perhaps because "Mockingbird" was seen as a novelty record, the pair had difficulty following it up, although "Ask Me" and "Hurt by Love" made the lower reaches of the US charts, and "Hurt by Love" also reached the UK singles chart. In 1966, the pair joined Musicor Records and recorded for its subsidiary label, Dynamo. They returned to the pop charts in 1967 with "(1-2-3-4-5-6-7) Count the Days", and became known for their exciting live performances. They toured extensively in Europe and their music played a key role in the development of the Northern soul movement, in which scene they had the very popular "Tightrope" single.

Inez Foxx married songwriter and producer Luther Dixon in the late 1960s. Together they wrote, and he produced, the Platters' mid-1960s return to hit-making with the single "I Love You 1000 Times". Luther Dixon produced Inez and Charlie's 1967 Dynamo album Come By Here, but the couple later divorced.

Inez also had some success recording on her own, beginning in 1969, but her popularity faded in the 1970s. Charlie was already working as a songwriter and record producer when they finally disbanded their act. Inez continued to record as a solo singer for Volt Records in the 1970s.

Charlie Foxx died from leukemia in 1998, at the age of 64, and was buried in Mobile, Alabama. Inez Foxx died in Los Angeles on August 25, 2022, at the age of 84 (though some sources incorrectly stated her age as 79).

== Discography ==
=== Chart singles ===
Year	Single	Chart Positions		
Year	Single	US Pop	US R&B	UK
1963	"Mockingbird"	7	2	-
1963	"Hi Diddle Diddle"; Inez Foxx	98	-	-
1964	"Ask Me"; Inez Foxx	91	-	-
1964	"Hurt By Love"; Inez Foxx	54	-	40
1966	"No Stranger To Love"	-	49	-
1967	"I Stand Accused"	127	41	-
1967	"You Are The Man"	-	32	-
1967	"(1-2-3-4-5-6-7) Count The Days"	76	17	-
1969	"Mockingbird" (reissue)	-	-	33
1973	"I Had A Talk With My Man"; Inez Foxx	-	74	-
1974	"Circuit's Overloaded"; Inez Foxx	-	83	-

=== Albums ===
- Mockingbird (1964)
- Come By Here (1967)
- Greatest Hits (1968)
- Inez & Charlie Foxx's Swinging Mockin' Band (1968) (instrumental album featuring Inez & Charlie Foxx's backing band)
- Inez Foxx At Memphis (1973) (Inez Foxx solo album)
- Inez & Charlie Foxx (1983)
