= Ike & Tina Turner's Kings of Rhythm Dance =

Ike & Tina Turner’s Kings of Rhythm Dance

Studio album by the Kings of Rhythm
- Released: March 1962
- Recorded: 1961
- Studio: Hollywood, CA
- Genre: Rock; R&B
- Label: Sue; STLP 2003
- Producer: Ike Turner

Singles from Dance with Ike & Tina Turner's Kings of Rhythm
- 1. "Prancing" Released: April 1962

Ike Turner chronology
Rocks the Blues (1963)

Ike & Tina Turner’s Kings of Rhythm Dance is an instrumental album by the Kings of Rhythm, released on Sue Records in 1962.

== Background ==
Following Ike & Tina Turner's success after signing with Sue Records in 1960, the label released an album from the duo's band the Kings of Rhythm led by Ike Turner. Ike & Tina Turner appear on the cover, but Tina Turner does not sing on this album.

Most of the songs were penned by Ike Turner with the exception of the duo's Grammy-nominated single "It's Gonna Work Out Fine."

== Critical reception ==
Professional ratings
Review scores
Source	Rating
AllMusic	2.5/5 stars
Billboard	4/4 stars

The album received positive reviews.

Billboard (March 10, 1962):

Here’s a rousing, exuberant package of danceable instrumentals (the Turner's don't sing here) with strong teen-appeal. The line-up, featuring standout guitar work, includes 'The Gulley', 'Potato Mash', 'Steel Guitar Rag' and 'Twistaroo'.

AllMusic editor Richie Unterberger wrote:

Although the 14 tracks on this album are very typical early-'60s rock/R&B instrumentals in their tunes and arrangements, Ike Turner's guitar work is sparkling, lifting the LP out of the generic realm... Ike Turner really squeezes the last drop of invention out of these run-of-the-mill backdrops, though, relentlessly bending notes, wangling the whammy bar, and letting loose with some unpredictable runs and aggressive chording.

== Track listing ==
All compositions by Ike Turner except where noted.

Side A
No.	Title	Writer(s)	Length
1.	"The Gulley"		2:13
2.	"Twistaroo"		2:12
3.	"Trackdown Twist"		2:13
4.	"Potatoe Mash"		2:14
5.	"It's Gonna Work Out Fine"	Rose Marie McCoy, Sylvia McKinney	2:36
6.	"Steel Guitar Rag"		2:45

Side B
No.	Title	Length
1.	"Doublemint"	2:22
2.	"The Rooster"	2:34
3.	"Prancing"	3:42
4.	"Katanga"	2:25
5.	"The Groove"	2:01
6.	"Going Home"	2:35

== Personnel ==
- Ike Turner – guitar
- Kings of Rhythm
