= Here's Johnny: Magic Moments from the Tonight Show =

1974 American record album

Soundtrack album by Various Artists
- Released: November 1974
- Venue: NBC Productions
- Genre: Jazz, funk, soul music, R&B, pop music, folk music, country music, comedy, spoken word, political
- Label: Casablanca Records
- Producer: Joyce Biawitz, Bernard Fox

Here's Johnny: Magic Moments from the Tonight Show is a live double album commemorating 25 years of The Tonight Show, released by Casablanca Records in 1974. The album features an array of performers with never before available performances on record. The album included a 25th anniversary poster summarizing the history of the show.

== Background and release ==
The Tonight Show first aired locally in New York City in 1953 and was hosted by Steve Allen. The show went nationally in 1954 on NBC, and was with Steve Allen as host, then was succeeded by Jack Paar in 1957. On October 1, 1962, Groucho Marx introduced Johnny Carson as the new host. By 1974, The Tonight Show Starring Johnny Carson had been on air for 12 years and it was the leading national late night program covering 99% of homes in the United States. To capitalize off of the show's popularity, a two record album was put together by Casablanca Records highlighting the comedy, conversations and music which made The Tonight Show the most successful late-night series.

Neil Bogart, president of Casablanca Records, heavily invested in the album, calling it "the most historical home entertainment package to ever be issued." The album release was launched with a major merchandising campaign in December 1974. It was billed as "the first million dollar album." The total cost was just under $1.2 million according to Bogart.

Despite the album being certified Gold by the RIAA, it didn't sell as much as anticipated mostly due to it not being radio-friendly. (A review from Allmusic notes the "awful" sound quality of a few tracks.) Carson had to be begged to promote the album on his show which caused a spike in sales, but overall it was a huge loss financially for Casablanca. The return rate from retailers of unsold copies was high which initiated the industry joke that Casablanca "shipped the LP Gold and it was returned Platinum."

== Critical reception ==
Professional ratings
Review scores
Source	Rating
Allmusic	3/5 stars

Cash Box (November 30, 1974):

A fantastic two record set, including a special poster, this LP offers some of the best music and comedy ever to be released in one package. Commemorating the Johnny Carson success story and the many stars who have emerged after appearing on his NBC-TV nightly talk show the set features appearances by Groucho Marx, Ike & Tina Turner, Bette Midler, Lenny Bruce, Pearl Bailey, Sammy Davis, Aretha Franklin, The Smothers Brothers and the unforgettable Art Fern.

== Track listing ==
Side 1
No.	Title	Performer(s)	Length
1.	"The Beginning"	Johnny Carson / Ed McMahon	4.22
2.	"Tonto, Tonto"	Jay Silverheels	4:01
3.	"Lullabye of Broadway / Boogie Woogie Bugle Boy"	Bette Midler	5:17
4.	"Father's Day"	Groucho Marx	4:01
5.	"Morningside Heights"	George Carlin	5:04
6.	"Our Love Is Here to Stay"	Pearl Bailey & Johnny Carson	6:06

Side 2
No.	Title	Performer(s)	Length
1.	"The Discovery"	Lenny Bruce	3:01
2.	"Them There Eyes / The Man That Got Away / Until You Come Back To Me (That's What I'm Gonna Do)"	Billie Holiday / Judy Garland / Aretha Franklin	9:51
3.	"Boil Them Cabbage Down"	Smothers Brothers	6:09
4.	Untitled	Richard M. Nixon	3:38
5.	Untitled	John Twomey	3:25

Side 3
No.	Title	Performer(s)	Length
1.	"What a Band"	Doc Severinsen, Ed McMahon, Johnny Carson	2:16
2.	"Ode to Billy Joe"	Doc Severinsen & His Sweetheart Band	3:06
3.	Untitled	Peter Falk	2:14
4.	Untitled	Jack Webb	2:46
5.	"I Think It's Gonna Work Out Fine"	Ike & Tina Turner	2:51
6.	Untitled	Lucille Ball	2:23
7.	"Seesaw"	Lucie Arnaz	2:07
8.	Untitled	Desi Arnaz Jr.	1:42
9.	"Art Fern & The Teatime Movies"	Art Fern	7:23

Side 4
No.	Title	Performer(s)	Length
1.	"An Anniversary Salute"	Johnny Carson / Ed McMahon / Dean Martin	4:43
2.	"Bleep That..."	Dean Martin / Johnny Carson / Buddy Hackett	3:44
3.	"Fiddler on the Bus"	Jack Benny	3:54
4.	"Free for All"	Jerry Lewis / Joey Bishop / George Burns	2:16
5.	"Indiana"	Glen Campbell	3:18
6.	"Mr. Warmth"	Don Rickles	5:48
7.	"Singing in the Rain"	Sammy Davis Jr.	3:35
8.	"Reprise"	Buddy Hackett & Sammy Davis Jr.	0:31

== Chart performance ==
Chart (1974)	Peak position
US Billboard Top LPs & Tape	30
US Cash Box Top 100	37

== Certification and sales ==
Region	Certification	Certified units/sales
United States (RIAA)	Gold	500,000^{^}
^{^} Shipments figures based on certification alone.
