= The Duals =

1960s American surf rock duo

The Duals were an American surf rock duo formed in Los Angeles, California, in 1961. Much of the collaboration's music capitalized on the style of music popularized in Southern California in the early 1960s. They reached the national charts with their song "Stick Shift" which became the Duals' only Top 40 hit. A studio album named after the Duals' hit song was released the following year.

== History ==
The Duals featured the partnership of Henry Bellinger (lead guitar) and Johnny Lageman (rhythm guitar), two friends who lived in the same neighborhood in Los Angeles. In 1961, the duo approached H. B. Barnum with hopes that the record producer would record them in Hollywood. Barnum, however, had little faith in the songs the Duals had written, but recommended them to Ron Barrett, an aspiring producer who recently established his own record label, Star Revue. Barrett was more receptive to the duo's simple, but upbeat, sound influenced by California's burgeoning surf scene. After extensive rehearsals, the Duals recorded "Stick Shift" and "Cruising". Not yet satisfied, Barrett audio mixed car noises and police sirens to "Stick Shift", the intended A-side to their debut single.

Sensing potential in "Stick Shift", Barrett took the single to Sonny Bono who helped the record receive extensive airplay in California. Sue Records bought the master tapes and distributed the single to wider audiences late in 1961. The single, the first instrumental hot rod recording to chart nationally, influenced the popularity of car songs as it reached number 25 on the Billboard Hot 100. Following the release of "Stick Shift", the Duals performed in Philadelphia and New York City. Despite their success, neither the Duals nor Star Revue, however, received any royalties from Sue Records for record sales until 2004.

In late 1961, the duo released their first and only studio album, named after their hit song. Two singles, "Cha Cha Guitars" and "The Big Race", were also released later in the year but flopped immediately. The Duals disbanded soon after. In 1996, Stick Shift was reissued on CD on Collectables Records.

== Discography ==
=== Singles ===
- "Stick Shift" b/w "Cruising" – Sue Records (745), 1961, #25, Billboard Hot 100
- "Cha Cha Guitars" b/w "Travelin' Guitars" – Sue Records (758), 1962
- "The Big Race" b/w "Oozy Groove" – Juggy Records (J-321), 1962

=== Album ===
- Stick Shift – Sue Records (2002), 1961
