= The Soul of Ike & Tina Turner =

1961 debut album by Ike & Tina Turner

Studio album by Ike & Tina Turner
- Released: February 1961
- Recorded: 1960, St. Louis
- Genre: Soul
- Length: 31:39
- Label: Sue
- Producer: Ike Turner, Juggy Murray

Ike & Tina Turner chronology
The Soul of Ike & Tina Turner (1961)	Dynamite! (1962)

Singles from The Soul of Ike & Tina Turner
- 1. "A Fool In Love" Released: July 1960; 2. "I Idolize You" Released: November 1960; 3. "I'm Jealous" Released: January 1961

The Soul of Ike & Tina Turner is the debut album by Ike & Tina Turner. It was released on the Sue Records in February 1961. The album is noted for containing the duo's debut single "A Fool in Love" and their follow-up singles "I Idolize You" and "I'm Jealous."

== History ==
Ike Turner had been an established name in rhythm and blues music ever since recording and composing "Rocket 88", often considered the "first rock and roll record to be released", in 1951 at the age of nineteen. Turner found success as a collaborator on various songs by established R&B and blues musicians such as B.B. King and also discovered Howlin' Wolf and Bobby "Blue" Bland, using his skills as a talent scout to get the acts signed to various labels and working as a session musician on piano. In 1954, three years after disbanding his band, the Kings of Rhythm, Turner reassembled the band while living in West Memphis and had his wife at the time, Bonnie Mae Wilson, accompanying him on piano while he played guitar.

By 1956, Turner and the Kings of Rhythm moved to East St. Louis and soon Ike his band earned the reputation as one of the liveliest bands in the St. Louis and East St. Louis club scenes. Ann Bullock from Brownsville, Tennessee caught the band's act at the predominantly black Club Manhattan in East St. Louis, with her sister Alline. One night, Kings of Rhythm drummer, Eugene Washington, gave Bullock a microphone and she sang the B.B. King ballad, "You Know I Love You." Stunned by her deep contralto vocals, Turner asked her to more songs. By the end of the night, Turner decided to include Bullock into the act as one of his many lead singers. For the next few years, Turner became her mentor; teaching her how to control her voice and to perform. They two developed a bond that both described as "brother and sister." In 1958, Bullock sang on her first recording under the moniker "Little Ann" on Turner's tune, "Boxtop."

== Recording ==
In March 1960, Turner scheduled his band for a session at Technisonic Studios in St. Louis to record his composition, "A Fool in Love," which he had written for singer Art Lassiter. Lassiter failed to show up for the session, so Bullock recorded a demo track with Turner and Lassiter's backing girl group, the Artettes. Turner had intentions of erasing her vocals later and replacing it with Lassiter's, but he never returned. Turner played the song during his gig at Club Imperial in St. Louis. Disc jockey, Dave Dixon, heard the record and asked Turner to send it to Juggy Murray, president of R&B label Sue Records in New York. After listening, Murray wanted the record and offered Turner a contact. Murray suggested that Turner concentrate on making Bullock the star of the show.

Ike responded to this by changing Bullock's stage name from Little Ann to Tina Turner, for two reasons: one because Tina rhymed with Sheena, one of his favorite fictional characters Sheena, Queen of the Jungle, and the other was for control of the name. He had the name trademarked so that in case Bullock decided to leave, he could hire another female vocalist to be Tina Turner. He later reformed the Artettes into the Ikettes, and with the Kings of Rhythm, The Ike & Tina Turner Revue was created.

This album was composed when the group was on the road. Most of the songs on the album are led solely by Tina though at least two songs, "You Can't Blame Me" and "You're My Baby" feature Ike singing with Tina.

== Release ==
The album was released in February 1961 and featured the pair on the cover. The album failed to chart despite the fact that the duo already had two hit singles by the time of the release. Their first single, "A Fool in Love" became an instant hit after its July 1960 release, peaking at No. 2 on the Billboard R&B chart in August 1960 and reaching No. 27 on the Billboard Hot 100 in October 1960. The single, "I Idolize You" was also a hit reaching No. 5 on the Billboard R&B chart in January 1961. The next single, "I'm Jealous" just missed the main Hot 100 chart, reaching No. 117 on Bubbling Under Hot 100 in February 1961.

== Critical reception ==
Professional ratings
Review scores
Source	Rating
AllMusic	3/5 stars

Cash Box (February 25, 1961):

True 'soul music' has always been a dear commodity in pop, but Ike & Tina Turner, who sing with an almost undiluted gospel fervor, have made it sell for them. Leading off with a rousing, unrestrained 'I'm Jealous', the two proceed through equally vibrant and stimulating readings of 'I Idolize You', 'A Fool in Love', 'The Way You Love Me' and 'Letter from Tina', their most recent hit.

== Reissues ==
The Soul of Ike & Tina Turner has been reissued several times from different labels on CD, among those is the compilation The Soul of Ike & Tina / Dynamite! released from Stateside Records in 2004.

In 2013, The Soul of Ike & Tina Turner was reissued by Rumble Records in its original vinyl format.

== Track listing ==
All songs written and composed by Ike Turner, except where indicated.

Side A
No.	Title	Writer(s)	Length
1.	"I'm Jealous"	Ike Turner, Jane Bussong	2:13
2.	"I Idolize You"		2:53
3.	"If"		2:10
4.	"Letter from Tina"		2:38
5.	"You Can't Love Two"		2:56
6.	"I Had a Notion"	Joe Morris	2:58

Side B
No.	Title	Writer(s)	Length
1.	"A Fool in Love"		2:53
2.	"Sleepless"	Ike Turner, Jane Bussong	2:51
3.	"Chances Are"		3:42
4.	"You Can't Blame Me"		2:13
5.	"You're My Baby"		2:22
6.	"The Way You Love Me"		1:50

== Personnel ==
- Lead vocals by Tina Turner except for "You Can't Blame Me" and "You're My Baby" with lead vocals by Ike and Tina Turner
- Background vocals by the Ikettes
- All instrumentation by Ike Turner and the Kings of Rhythm
