= Dynamite! (Ike & Tina Turner album) =

Studio album by Ike & Tina Turner
- Released: May 1962
- Recorded: 1961–1962
- Label: Sue
- Producer: Ike Turner, Juggy Murray

Ike & Tina Turner chronology
The Soul of Ike & Tina Turner (1961)	Dynamite! (1962)	Don't Play Me Cheap (1963)

Singles from Dynamite!
- 1. "It's Gonna Work Out Fine" Released: June 1961; 2. "Poor Fool" Released: November 1961; 3. "Tra La La La La" Released: March 1962; 4. "You Should'a Treated Me Right" Released: June 1962

Dynamite! is the second studio album released by Ike & Tina Turner on the Sue Records label in 1962. The album contains their first Grammy nominated song and their second million-selling hit "It's Gonna Work Out Fine."

== Recording and release ==
In the midst of their busy touring schedule on the Chitlin' Circuit and in between club residencies in their home base of St. Louis, Ike and Tina recorded new material. Several of the songs were culled from those 1961 and 1962 sessions. The album as features previously released hits from their debut album, The Soul of Ike & Tina Turner, such as "A Fool In Love" and "I Idolize You." Unlike earlier pressings, the track "Letter From Tina" is heard in its entirety on this album. Ike and Tina recorded a duet, the pop-soul ballad "Won't You Forgive Me." R&B duo Mickey & Sylvia contributed to the record "It's Gonna Work Out Fine" on guitar and vocal.

Dynamite! was released on Sue Records in May 1962. The album cover features Ike looking towards Tina who is posing with a mink coat posing in a suggestive way that was started to build within her stage act.

Several singles from the album were successful including the Grammy-nominated, "It's Gonna Work Out Fine" which peaked at No. 2 on the Hot R&B Sides and became their third song to reach the pop chart, reaching No. 14 on the Billboard Hot 100. The follow-up singles all charted on the Billboard Hot 100: "Poor Fool" (Pop No. 38, R&B No. 4), "Tra La La La La" (Pop No. 50, R&B No. 9), and "You Should'a Treated Me Right" (Pop No. 89).

== Critical reception ==
Professional ratings
Review scores
Source	Rating
AllMusic	2/5 stars

Chick Ober wrote for the Tampa Bay Times (May 18, 1962): "Ike & Tina Turner drift effectively from a quiet relaxed mood to one charged with driving excitement in this varied program. Highlights: 'You Should'a Treated Me Right', 'Sleepless', 'I Dig You', 'A Fool in Love'."

== Reissues ==
In 1994, the album was reissued on CD on Collectables Records. It was also included in the double CD compilation The Soul of Ike & Tina / Dynamite! released on Stateside Records in 2004. In 2014, Rumble Records released the album in its original format on vinyl.

== Track listing ==
All songs written by Ike Turner, except where indicated.

Side A
No.	Title	Writer(s)	Length
1.	"You Should'a Treated Me Right"		3:40
2.	"It's Gonna Work Out Fine"	Rose Marie McCoy (uncredited), Joe Seneca, James Lee	3:03
3.	"A Fool in Love"		2:52
4.	"Poor Fool"		2:33
5.	"I Idolize You"		2:51
6.	"Tra La La La La"		2:40

Side B
No.	Title	Writer(s)	Length
1.	"Sleepless"		2:50
2.	"I'm Jealous"	Ike Turner, Jane Bussong	2:15
3.	"Won't You Forgive Me"		2:42
4.	"The Way You Love Me"		1:52
5.	"I Dig You"	Joe Seneca, Maynor Steward	2:22
6.	"Letter From Tina"		2:34
