= Don't Play Me Cheap =

Studio album by Ike & Tina Turner
- Released: February 1963
- Genre: Blues; R&B
- Length: 26:18
- Label: Sue
- Director: Juggy Murray

Ike & Tina Turner chronology
Dynamite! (1962)	Don't Play Me Cheap (1963)	It's Gonna Work Out Fine (1963)

Singles from Don't Play Me Cheap
- 1. "Wake Up" Released: April 1963

Don't Play Me Cheap is a studio album by Ike & Tina Turner, released on Sue Records in 1963.

== Content and release ==
Don't Play Me Cheap was arranged by Jesse Herring and René Hall. It features mainly compositions by Ike Turner; the exceptions are "The Real Me" which was written by Curtis Mayfield and "Love Letters" written by Edward Heyman and Victor Young. The album was released in February 1963 and produced one single, "Wake Up," released in April 1963 with the title track as the B-side. The song "I Made A Promise Up Above" was the B-side to the single "Dear John" in 1966.

== Critical reception ==
Professional ratings
Review scores
Source	Rating
AllMusic	2.5/5 stars

The Louisville Defender (February 21, 1963):

The tunes selected for this album arc inspired choices to bring out Tina's rare ability to be equally at home with a shouting, screaming pulser, or a tender ballad that gives her a chance to show off her more gentle kittenish side.

Cash Box (February 23, 1963):

Ike and Tina are one of the best-blended teams around today. Tina's exacting sense of rhythm on both pulsating r&b numbers and ballads is perfectly complemented by Ike's first-rate piano and guitar work. The duo are in fine form on this Sue entry of danceable blues sides. The songstress belts out winning readings of 'Wake Up', 'Don't Play Me Cheap' and 'My Everything to Me' with all of her expected poise and artistry.

== Reissues ==
Don't Play Me Cheap was reissued on CD by Collectables Records in 1997. It was reissued in its original LP format by Rumble Records in 2015.

== Track listing ==
All songs written by Ike Turner, except where indicated.

Side A
No.	Title	Length
1.	"Wake Up"	2:05
2.	"I Made a Promise Up Above"	2:19
3.	"Desire"	2:58
4.	"Those Ways"	1:45
5.	"Mama Tell Him"	2:33
6.	"Pretend"	1:47

Side B
No.	Title	Writer(s)	Length
1.	"Don't Play Me Cheap"		2:08
2.	"The Real Me"	Curtis Mayfield	2:01
3.	"Forever Mine"		2:15
4.	"No Amends"		2:22
5.	"Love Letters"	Edward Heyman, Victor Young (uncredited)	1:54
6.	"My Everything to Me"		2:30
