= It's Gonna Work Out Fine =

Single by Ike & Tina Turner

from the album Dynamite!/It's Gonna Work Out Fine
- B-side: "Won't You Forgive Me"
- Released: June 1961
- Recorded: 1961
- Genre: R&B
- Length: 2:53
- Label: Sue Records
- Songwriters: Rose Marie McCoy (as J. Lee), Sylvia McKinney or Joe Seneca
- Producer: Ike Turner

Ike & Tina Turner singles chronology
"I'm Jealous" (1961)	"It's Gonna Work Out Fine" (1961)	"Poor Fool" (1961)

"It's Gonna Work Out Fine" is a song made famous by Ike & Tina Turner in 1961 as a single issued on the Sue label. It was also included on their 1962 album Dynamite!. The record is noted for being their first Grammy nominated song and their second million-selling single after "A Fool in Love".

Composer credits, on the Ike and Tina Turner single, are given to Joe Seneca and James Lee, the pseudonym of Rose Marie McCoy. In 1966 the song was recorded again by Terry "Gibby" Haynes for Jetstar Records, and on this release the composers are listed as McCoy and Sylvia McKinney. McKinney was also known as Sylvia Robinson who was McCoy's regular song-writing partner, and half of the duo Mickey & Sylvia. On the 2018 re-release of Dynamite!, Seneca was given sole song-writing credit.

== Background ==
Following the success of "A Fool in Love", Ike & Tina Turner scored another hit with "I Idolize You", and they released their debut album, The Soul of Ike & Tina Turner in February 1961. They toured all over the country on the Chitlin' Circuit as The Ike & Tina Turner Revue, which included Ike's band the Kings of Rhythm, and three backing vocalists known as the Ikettes.

== Recording and release ==
Songwriter Rose Marie McCoy co-wrote "It's Gonna Work Out Fine" with Joe Seneca, but McCoy used her pseudonym James Lee when it was copyrighted. After being suggested by her writing partner Sylvia to hear Tina Turner sing, McCoy attended their show at the Apollo Theater and approached the duo about recording the song. Ike and Tina Turner recorded the song with their band and the Ikettes in New York.

Sylvia Robinson of the duo Mickey & Sylvia reportedly produced and arranged the song, but she did not receive credit. In a 1981 interview with Black Radio Exclusive magazine Robinson said, "I paid for the session, taught Tina the song; that's me playing guitar." Mickey & Sylvia also recorded a version of the song in 1960 which was unreleased until their 1990 compilation album Love Is Strange.

Ike & Tina Turner's version was released as a single in June 1961 and became their biggest hit since "A Fool in Love". It peaked at No. 2 on the Billboard Hot R&B Sides chart and became their third pop hit, reaching No. 14 on the Hot 100.

In addition to being released on the album Dynamite! in 1962, the song was also released on the album It's Gonna Work Out Fine in 1963.

== Critical reception ==
Professional ratings
Review scores
Source	Rating
Billboard	3/4 stars

Billboard (June 19, 1961): "Ike and Tina talk about love on this attractive disk which also features a gospel-styled chorus. Pair handle the tune with gusto and it has a chance."

Cash Box (June 24, 1961):

Ike & Tina Turner, who’ve had dual-mart R&B-pop chart representations in "A Fool In Love" and "I Idolize You," can soon be claiming another one in "It's Gonna Work Out Fine." Side, a hip-swinging, beat-ballad thumper, sports a delectable chorus-backed, verbal exchange between the two. Strings play an important part in the rhythmic, rock-a-shuffler on the lower end.

== Awards and nominations ==
"It's Gonna Work Out Fine" earned Ike and Tina their first Grammy Award nomination for Best Rock & Roll Recording at the 4th Annual Grammy Awards.

== Sequels and re-recordings ==
Ike and Tina released several "sequels" related to the song, including 1962's "The Argument", in which they sang in a similar way but this time involved in an argument, and the "official" sequel, "Something Came Over You", recorded during their tenure at Kent Records.

In 1966 the Turners re-recorded the original for the album, River Deep - Mountain High. The duo re-recorded the song again in 1975.

In 1993 Tina re-recorded the song for the soundtrack to the biopic, What's Love Got to Do with It. Her saxophonist, Timmy Cappello, sang Ike's lines.

== Live performances ==
"It's Gonna Work Out Fine" was performed in most of Ike and Tina's sets in the 1960s, most notably on The Big T.N.T. show in 1965, but as they began incorporating covers of rock tunes to their show, the song was rarely performed again. However, they performed the song on The Tonight Show Starring Johnny Carson in 1972. Their performance was included on the double LP Here's Johnny: Magic Moments From The Tonight Show released by Casablanca Records in 1974.

Tina performed the song along with "A Fool In Love" in an Ike & Tina medley during her early solo live shows in the late 1970s. After hiring Roger Davies in 1980, the song was taken off her setlist.

== Personnel ==
=== 1961 version ===
- Lead vocal by Tina Turner
- Spoken vocal by Mickey Baker
- Background vocals by Mickey & Sylvia and The Ikettes
- Produced by Ike Turner

=== 1993 version ===
- Lead vocal by Tina Turner
- Spoken vocal by Timmy Cappello
- Background vocals by Jacquelyn Gouche, Jean McClain and Sharon Brown
- Produced by Chris Lord-Alge, Roger Davies and Tina Turner

== Cover versions ==
- The Kings of Rhythm recorded an instrumental version that was released on the album Ike & Tina Turner's Kings of Rhythm Dance in 1962, which was released as a single in April of that year.
- Manfred Mann covered the song on their album The Five Faces of Manfred Mann in 1964.
- The Spencer Davis Group covered the song on their debut album Their First LP in 1965.
- Ry Cooder recorded an instrumental version of the tune on his Bop Till You Drop album in 1979.
- Linda Ronstadt and James Taylor released a version of "I Think It's Gonna Work Out Fine" on Ronstadt's 1982 album Get Closer.
- Ronnie Spector and Andre Williams released a version of the song on Williams' 2001 album Bait and Switch on Norton Records.

== Chart performance ==
=== Weekly charts ===
Chart (1961)	Peak position
US Billboard Hot 100	14
US Billboard Hot R&B Sides	2
US Cash Box Top 100	21
US Cash Box Top 50 R&B	2

=== Year-end charts ===
Chart (1961)	Rank
US Billboard Hot 100 singles	65
US Cash Box Top 50 R&B Records	5
