= Tra La La La La =

1962 song by Ike & Tina Turner

Single by Ike & Tina Turner

from the album Dynamite!
- B-side: "Puppy Love"
- Released: March 1962
- Length: 2:30
- Label: Sue Records
- Songwriter: Ike Turner
- Producer: Ike Turner

Ike & Tina Turner singles chronology
"Poor Fool" (1961)	"Tra La La La La" (1962)	"You Should'a Treated Me Right" (1962)

"Tra La La La La" is a song written and produced by Ike Turner, and released by him and his then-wife Tina on Sue Records as the third single from the couple's 1962 album Dynamite!.

== Release ==
"Tra La La La La" became the duo's fifth top 10 R&B hit in less than two years since their inception, peaking at No. 9 on the Billboard R&B singles chart, but was much less successful on the main Billboard Hot 100 chart, where it reached No. 50.

The B-side non-album track, "Puppy Love," is an edited version of the song "Chances Are" from the duo's debut album The Soul of Ike & Tina Turner.

== Critical reception ==
Professional ratings
Review scores
Source	Rating
Billboard	4/4 stars

Billboard (March 17, 1962): "Ike and Tina sell this wild side with enthusiasm over uninhibited backing by group and ork. Could get exposure, especially on r&b stations."

Cash Box (March 17, 1962):

Ike & Tina Turner, riding a string of r&b-pop clicks that recently include "A Fool In Love," should continue their winning ways with this one. It's a bright rock-a-cha-cha, labeled "Tra La La La La," that Tina & chorus invitingly chant against terrific Ike Turner instrumental backdrop. Backing's a ripplying rhythmic blueser tabbed "Puppy Love."

== Track listing ==
All tracks are written by Ike Turner.

No.	Title	Length
1.	"Tra La La La La"	2:30
2.	"Puppy Love"	2:35

== Chart performance ==
Chart (1962)	Peak position
US Billboard Hot 100	50
US Billboard Hot R&B Sides	9
US Cash Box Top 100	55
US Cash Box Top 50 R&B	21
