= I'm Jealous (Ike & Tina Turner song) =

Single by Ike & Tina Turner

from the album The Soul of Ike & Tina Turner
- B-side: "You're My Baby"
- Released: January 1961
- Label: Sue Records
- Songwriters: Ike Turner, Jane Bossung
- Producer: Ike Turner

Ike & Tina Turner singles chronology
"I Idolize You" (1960)	"I'm Jealous" (1961)	"It's Gonna Work Out Fine" (1961)

"I'm Jealous" is a song written by Ike Turner and Jane Bossung. It was released by Ike & Tina Turner on Sue Records in January 1961. The record was the third single from the duo's debut album The Soul of Ike & Tina Turner.

== Critical reception ==
The single was chosen as Cash Box's Pick of the Week and one of Billboard's Spotlight Winners of the Week.

Cash Box (February 4, 1961): "Twosome, having clicked with 'A Fool In Love' and 'I Idolize You,' seem to have their third-in-a-row dual mart'er in 'I'm Jealous.' It’s a shufflin' blueser featuring Tina at her wailing best. Ike's instrumentalists and the gal chorus lend a solid backdrop. The coupler, 'You're My Baby,' is another rhythmic shuffler with loads of appeal."

Billboard (January 30, 1961): "Two solid sides. On top, the gal half of the duo goes it alone on a wonderfully effective gospel-inspired performance. Much excitement here. The flip features the duo on a good blues-based ballad. Either side here with an edge to the first. Sides also have pop potential."

== Chart performance ==
Chart	Peak position
US Billboard Bubbling Under Hot 100	117
US Cash Box Top 100	83
US Cash Box Top 50 R&B	43
