= Ike & Tina Turner =

American musical duo

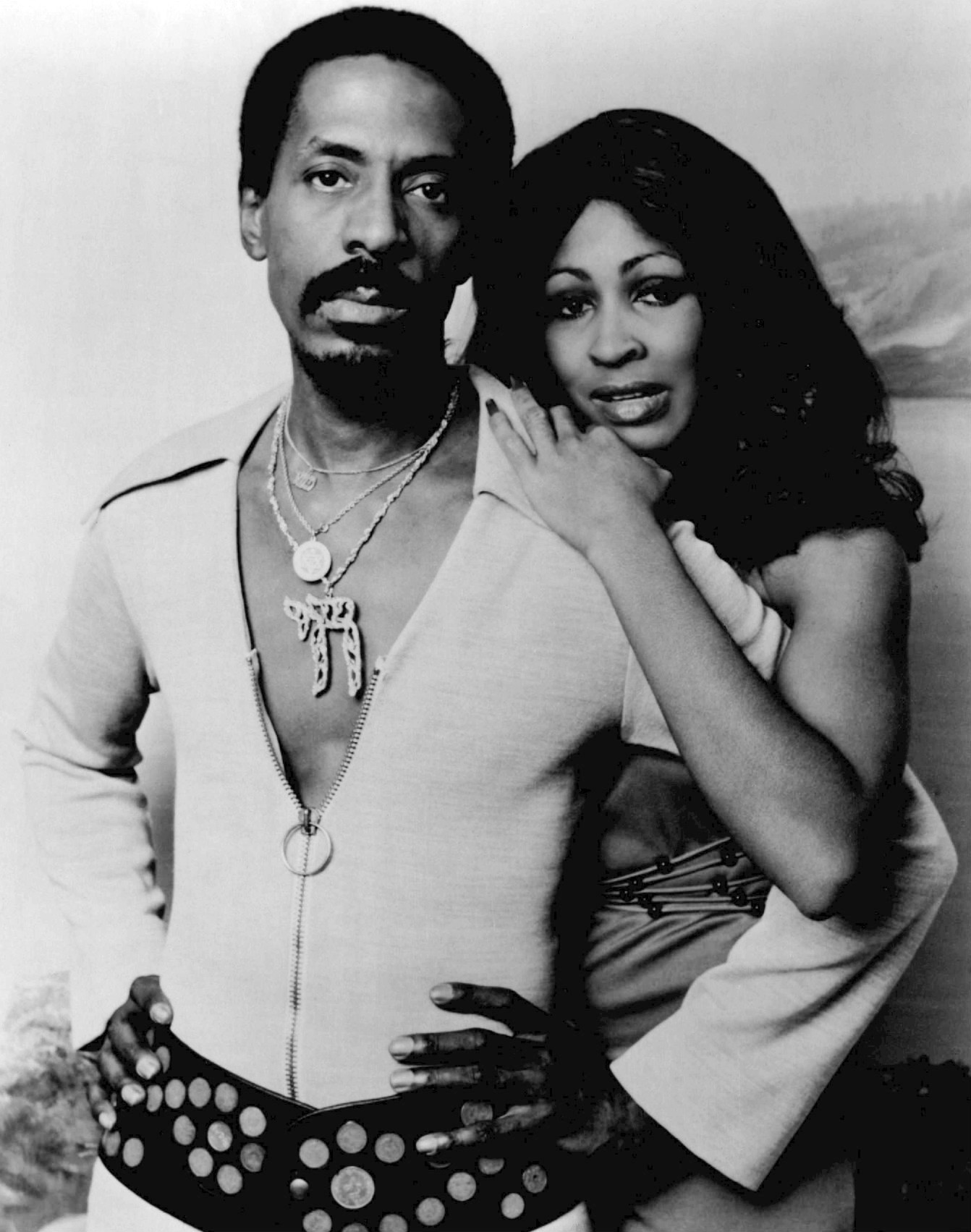
- Ike & Tina Turner in 1973

Background information
- Origin: St. Louis, Missouri, U.S.
- Genres: R&B; soul; blues; rock and roll; funk rock
- Years active: 1960–1976
- Labels: Sue; Sonja; Warner Bros.; Kent; Loma; Modern; Tangerine; Innis; Philles; Pompeii; Blue Thumb; Minit; A&M; Liberty; United Artists
- Past members: Ike Turner; Tina Turner

Ike & Tina Turner was an American musical duo composed of husband-and-wife Ike Turner and Tina Turner. From 1960 to 1976, they performed live as the Ike & Tina Turner Revue, supported by the Kings of Rhythm and backing vocalists, the Ikettes. They were regarded as "one of the most potent live acts on the R&B circuit" and "leading exponents" of soul music.

Ike & Tina Turner had a string of R&B hits with their early recordings "A Fool In Love", "It's Gonna Work Out Fine", "I Idolize You", "Poor Fool", and "Tra La La La La". The release of "River Deep – Mountain High" in 1966, followed by a tour of the UK with the Rolling Stones, increased their popularity in Europe. Their later works are noted for interpretive soul-infused re-arrangements of rock songs such as "Come Together", "Honky Tonk Woman", and "Proud Mary", the latter of which won them a Grammy Award in 1972. The pair received the first Golden European Record Award for their international hit "Nutbush City Limits" in 1974. They released dozens of albums; their most successful by chart performance being Workin' Together. Pitchfork listed their album River Deep – Mountain High among the best of its era. The duo sold more than 10 million records worldwide. Despite their success, they had a tumultuous marriage and disbanded in 1976. Following their divorce, Tina achieved a highly acclaimed solo career, while Ike later found renewed success after returning to his blues roots. Ike died on December 12, 2007, at age 76, and Tina died on May 24, 2023, at age 83.

Ike & Tina Turner were inducted into the Rock and Roll Hall of Fame in 1991. Two of their singles, "River Deep – Mountain High" and "Proud Mary," were inducted into the Grammy Hall of Fame. Rolling Stone magazine ranked them No. 2 on its list of the 20 Greatest Duos of All Time.

== Career ==
=== 1954–1959: Origins ===
In 1954, musician and bandleader Ike Turner visited his sister Lee Ethel Knight in St. Louis, Missouri. Soon after, he returned with his band, the Kings of Rhythm, to perform at Ned Love's club in East St. Louis, Illinois. Love eventually convinced Turner to relocate his band from Clarksdale, Mississippi. By 1956, Turner and his band became one of the most popular live attractions in the St. Louis and neighboring East St. Louis club scene. Prior to his move, Turner worked as a talent scout and session musician for Sun Records, Modern Records, and RPM Records. Around this time, Ann Bullock had moved to St. Louis from Brownsville, Tennessee. She began attending a predominantly African American nightclub, Club Manhattan, where she saw the Kings of Rhythm for the first time. She later recalled that she "almost went into a trance" watching Turner play.

Bullock eventually got to know Turner and his band. Bullock, who had tried to convince Turner to let her perform onstage with him, was given a microphone from the band's drummer Eugene Washington. Washington was the boyfriend of Bullock's sister Alline Bullock, who was a bartender at the club. Turner was playing B.B. King's "You Know I Love You" on the organ when Bullock chimed in. He was taken aback by her strong voice which was in contrast to her skinny frame. He asked her if she knew more songs, and by the end of the night she had joined the Kings of Rhythm. Still in high school, Bullock performed with Turner on weekends at all of the local clubs. She was one of many other vocalists, mostly male, who would front the band at times. She began dating Turner's saxophonist Raymond Hill, with whom she had her first child, Craig Raymond Turner, born in 1958 (died in 2018).

In 1958, Bullock sang on "Boxtop" under the name "Little Ann". The single was released on the St. Louis label, Tune Town Records. Bullock later moved into Turner's home in East St. Louis, where she was trained by him on vocal control and performance. They developed a close friendship, and acted more like "brother and sister". However, their friendship eventually turned into a romantic relationship and she became pregnant in January 1960.

=== 1960–1965: Early success ===
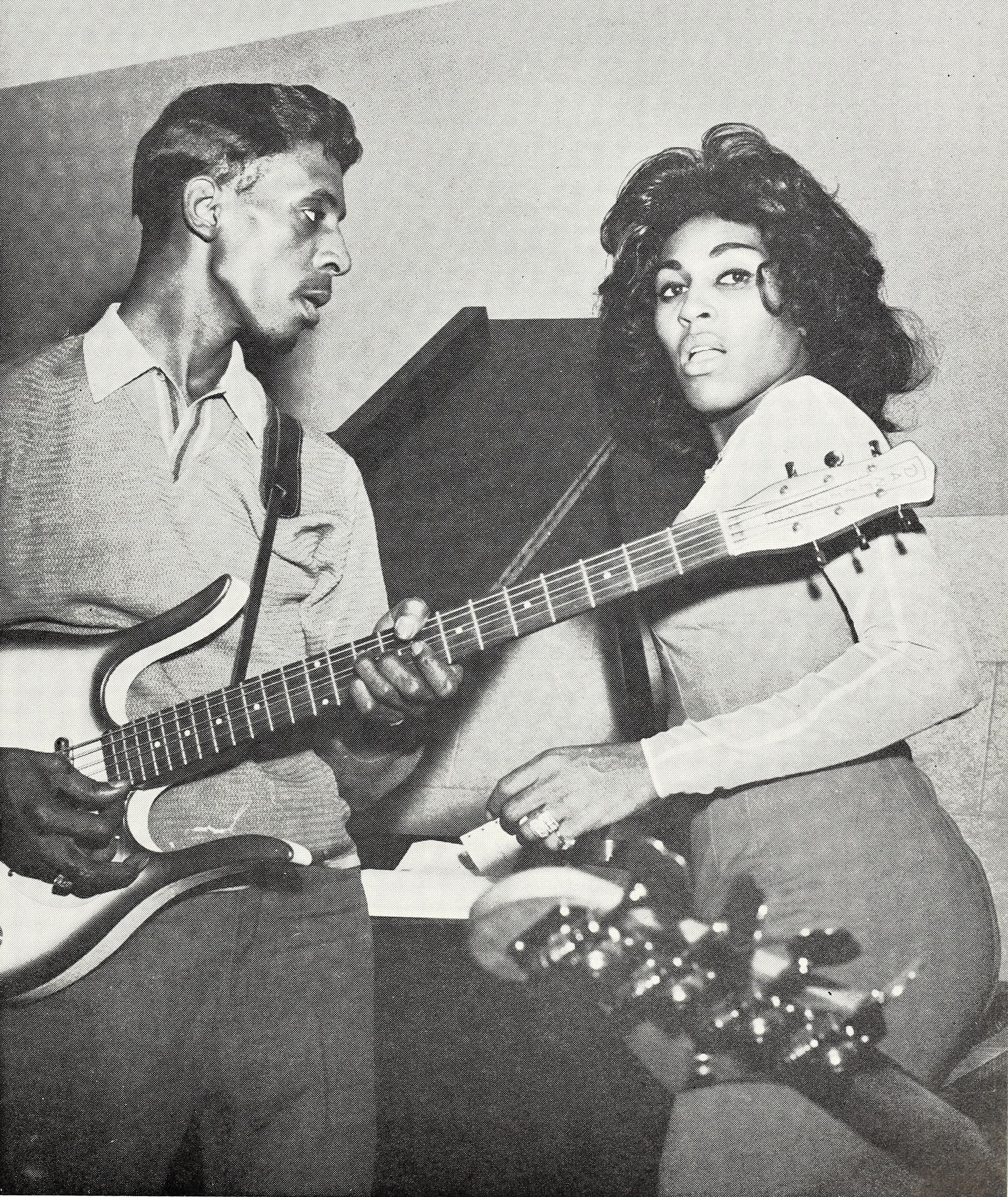
Ike & Tina Turner on the cover of the June 30, 1962 issue of Cash Box

In March 1960, Ike scheduled his band to record a song he wrote, titled "A Fool In Love", for singer Art Lassiter. Lassiter failed to show up for the recording session at Technisonic Studios in St. Louis. Having already booked the studio time, Ike allowed Bullock to record the song as a demo with Lassiter's backing vocalists, the Artettes: Robbie Montgomery, Frances Hodges, and Sandra Harding. During a gig at the Club Manhattan in East St. Louis, Ike played the record which caught the attention of local disc jockey Dave Dixon from the radio station KATZ. Dixon asked Ike to let him send the record to Juggy Murray, the president of Sue Records in New York. Murray was impressed by Bullock's vocal delivery and bought the rights to the song. Murray offered Ike a $20,000 advance, convincing him to keep Bullock's vocals on the record and suggesting that he "make her the star" of his show. This prompted Ike to rename her Tina Turner, however, family and friends still called her Ann. He then trademarked the name for protection, so that if she left he could hire another female artist and have her perform under the moniker "Tina Turner". He chose the name Tina because it rhymed with Sheena, his favorite character, Sheena, Queen of the Jungle. At first they were going to use "Ike Turner and Tina" on the record, but Murray suggested that "Ike and Tina Turner" sounded better. Tina had reservations about continuing her relationship with Ike. According to Tina, after she expressed her concern, Ike responded by hitting her in the head with a wooden shoe stretcher.

The single "A Fool In Love" became an immediate hit after its release in July 1960, reaching No. 2 on the Billboard Hot R&B Sides on August 15. Ike formed the Ike & Tina Turner Revue, which included the Kings of Rhythm, male vocalist Jimmy Thomas, and a trio of female vocalists called the Ikettes. As the single climbed the pop chart they went from playing in clubs to theaters such as the Apollo Theater in Harlem. On October 3, they made their first national television debut on American Bandstand when Tina was over eight months pregnant. "A Fool In Love" peaked at No. 27 on the Hot 100 on October 17, eventually selling a million copies. Journalist Kurt Loder described the song as "the blackest record to creep into the white pop charts since Ray Charles's gospel-styled 'What'd I Say' the previous summer." On October 27, Tina gave birth to their son Ronald "Ronnie" Renelle Turner.

There was never any doubt that Tina Turner was the star of the Ike and Tina Turner Revue, the electrifying performer audiences came to see. Ike kept his own stage presence deliberately low-key, avoiding flamboyant moves and directing the band with underplayed, economical gestures. His songwriting, production, and music direction were geared towards showcasing Tina.

— Robert Palmer (1993)

The success of the single was followed with another hit, "I Idolize You" and the release of their debut album The Soul of Ike & Tina Turner in February 1961. That same month, before a gig at Howard Theatre in Washington, D.C., Tina decided to have her hair bleached, but a miscue resulted in her hair falling out. To cover up the incident Ike bought Tina a wig, which became incorporated into her stage appearance. In June 1961, the duo released their next hit, "It's Gonna Work Out Fine". Juggy Murray is credited as the sole producer, but the R&B duo Mickey & Sylvia also contributed to the song. It became Ike and Tina's second million-seller, and earned them their first Grammy nomination for Best Rock and Roll Recording at the 4th Annual Grammy Awards.

The Ike & Tina Turner Revue toured a grueling series of one-nighters throughout the United States on the Chitlin' Circuit, breaking racial barriers by performing in front of integrated audiences in the Deep South. Follow-up top 10 R&B hits in 1962 include "Poor Fool" and "Tra La La La La". Thanks to the addition of singers Stacy Johnson and Vernon Guy, Tina and the Ikettes who at this point comprised Robbie Montgomery, Venetta Fields, and Jessie Smith, began incorporating dance routines into the act. During this period, the revue built a reputation as one of the most explosive R&B ensembles. Their live performances were a musical spectacle comparable to the style of James Brown and the Famous Flames.

In 1962, Ike and Tina married in Tijuana, Mexico, and moved their entire band to Los Angeles. In November 1962, Ike and Tina filed a $330,000 joint lawsuit with Placid Music Corporation against Sue Records, Saturn Music, and Juggy Murray for "failing and refusing to give an accounting and pay certain royalties." They also charged that Sue "withheld and concealed over $100,000" of their earnings from them. In 1963, their last two albums they previously recorded were issued on Sue, Don't Play Me Cheap and It's Gonna Work Out Fine. Also in 1963, Ike purchased a home in View Park with an advance given by Murray for a renewed contract which they didn't sign. Instead, the duo severed ties with Murray who had been their manager during their Sue tenure. In 1964, they signed to Warner Bros. Records and hired Bob Krasnow as their manager.

To make sure he always had a record out while on tour, Ike formed various labels such as Teena, Prann, Innis, Sony, Sonja Records. He released singles from vocalists within the revue and other groups as well. While Ike constantly recorded the revue, they performed 300 days out of the year to make up for lack of hit records. The personnel of the Kings of Rhythm and the lineup of Ikettes changed often. In the mid-1960s, Jimi Hendrix briefly played backing guitar in the band.

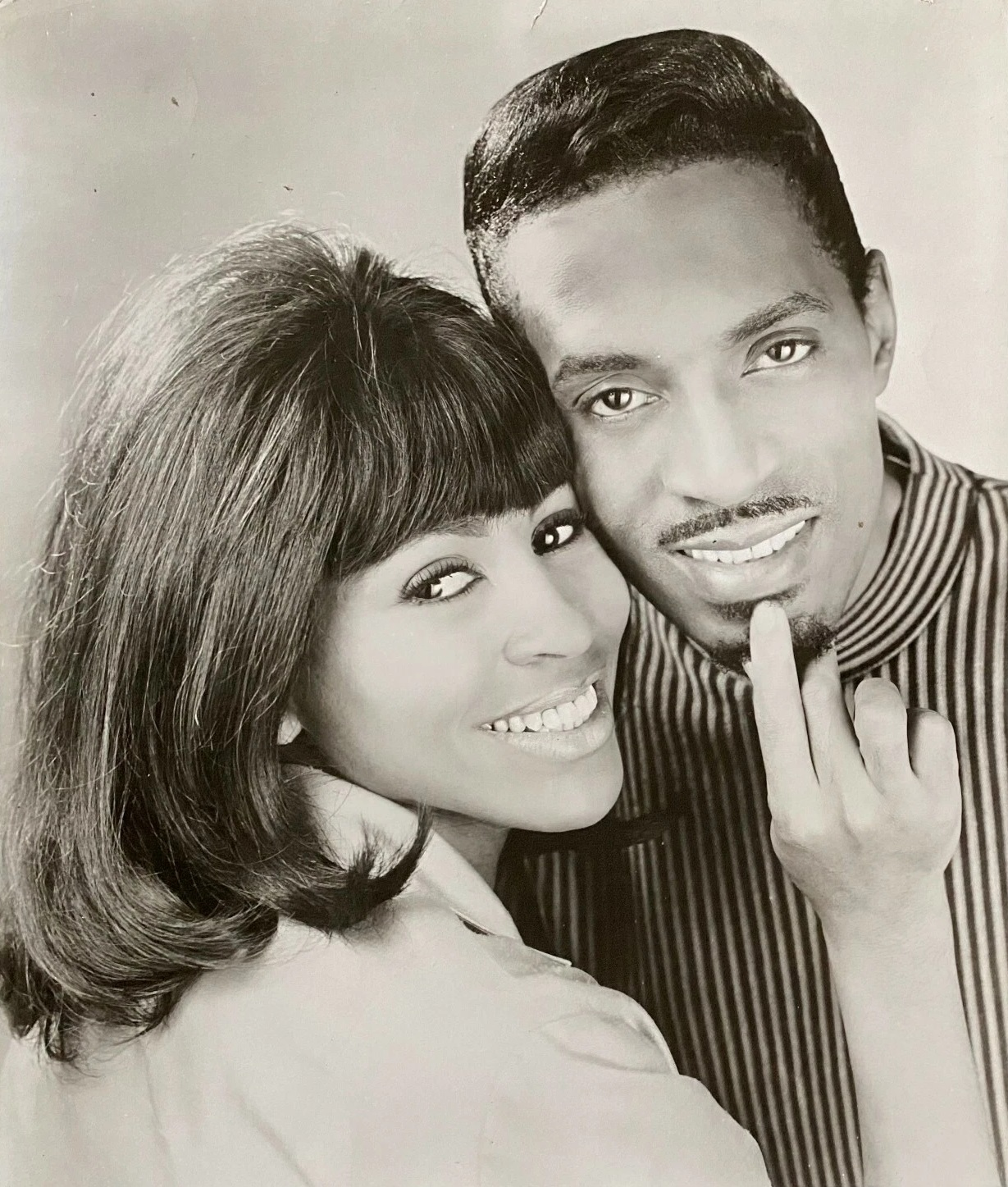
Publicity photo of Ike & Tina Turner, 1965

In 1964, Ike and Tina had modest R&B hits with "You Can't Miss Nothing That You Never Had" and "A Fool For A Fool". They released their first live album, Ike & Tina Turner Revue Live, on Kent in November 1964. It was their first album to chart, reaching No. 90 on the Cash Box Top 100. Their first Billboard charting album, Live! The Ike & Tina Turner Show, was released in January 1965 on Warner Bros. Records. It reached No. 126 on Billboard Top LP's and No. 8 on Hot R&B LP's in February 1965. In 1965, the duo had two top 40 Billboard R&B hits with "Tell Her I'm Not Home" on Loma Records and "Good Bye, So Long" on Modern Records. Later that year, they re-signed to Sue and released the single "Two Is A Couple", which peaked at No. 15 on the Cash Box R&B chart.

Throughout 1965, the Ike & Tina Turner Revue performed on several teen rock and roll television shows including Shindig!, Hollywood a Go Go, and American Bandstand. Tina and the Ikettes improved their choreography by incorporating high energy dance routines. Phil Spector had seen them perform at a club on the Sunset Strip and invited them to appear in the concert film The Big T.N.T. Show which was filmed on November 29–30, 1965. By the end of the year, the official incarnation of the Ikettes abruptly left and eventually formed the Mirettes. Ike hired another set of Ikettes: Pat Arnold (a.k.a. P. P. Arnold), Gloria Scott, and Maxine Smith.

=== 1966–1969: Career development ===
Eager to produce Tina, Phil Spector negotiated a deal with Ike and Tina's manager Bob Krasnow, who was head of Loma Records. Spector offered $20,000 to release them from their contract and for creative control over his sessions with Tina. After their release from Loma, they signed to Spector's Philles Records label. On March 7, 1966, Tina began recording the Phil Spector/Ellie Greenwich/Jeff Barry composition "River Deep – Mountain High" at Gold Star Studios in Hollywood. The single failed to chart successfully in the United States, reaching No. 88 on the Hot 100. The disappointing chart performance caused the album, River Deep – Mountain High, to be shelved in America where it wasn't released until 1969. However, in Britain, the song became a hit, reaching No. 3 on the UK charts. It also reached No. 1 on Los 40 Principales in Spain. Due to popular demand, Spector released the album in the UK on London Records in September 1966 with liner notes written by Decca's promotion man Tony Hall. Hall included a quote from Spector stating, "We can only assume that England is more appreciative of talent and exciting music than the U.S.".

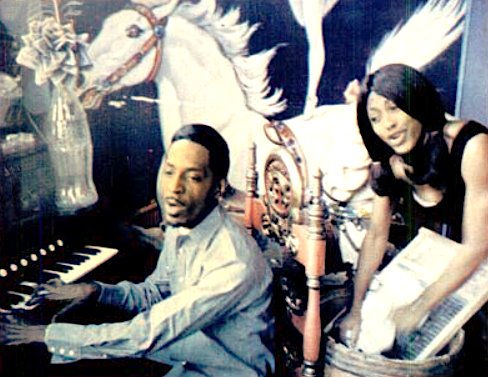
Ike & Tina Turner by Dennis Hopper for the album River Deep – Mountain High (1966)

Following their chart success in Britain, they toured with the Rolling Stones as an opening act on their 1966 UK Tour. The successful 12-date tour began at the Royal Albert Hall on September 23 and concluded on October 9 at the Gaumont Theatre. After the tour, the Turners performed at California Ballroom and toured Britain's club circuit to receptive crowds at Tiles, Ricky-Tick and the Mojo Club. To take advantage of the excitement around their performances, the single "A Love Like Yours" was hastily released in the United Kingdom and reached No. 16 on the UK charts.

When the revue returned to the US, they were involved in a serious bus accident while on the road in Wichita, Kansas. A few band members were hospitalized, so Turner recruited members from St. Louis to continue the tour. By 1967, the revue started to book bigger venues in the United States. They performed a series of "exclusive deals" during this period, to help increase their finances. As their careers were rising, their personal relationship was deteriorating and Tina attempted suicide before a show in 1968.

In 1968, Bob Krasnow founded Blue Thumb Records, and Ike gave him enough masters for two albums. The first album, Outta Season, peaked at No. 43 on the Billboard R&B LP's chart. It produced the duo's cover of Otis Redding's "I've Been Loving You Too Long", which peaked at No. 23 on the R&B singles chart. In March 1969, Ike and Tina performed at the Grand Gala du Disque in Amsterdam. In May 1969, Ike and the Kings of Rhythm released the album A Black Man's Soul on Pompeii Records. The album earned Ike his first solo Grammy nomination for Best R&B Instrumental Performance at the 12th Annual Grammy Awards.

In August 1969, the duo headlined at International Hotel's Casino Theatre in Las Vegas. It was in Vegas that Ike, who up to that point had lived a drug and alcohol-free life, began using cocaine. He later recalled that he was introduced to the drug by "two famous Las Vegas headliners".

In September 1969, A&M Records reissued the album River Deep – Mountain High, and for the first time it was issued in the US. It was successful, reaching No. 28 on the R&B albums chart. The next month The Hunter was released on Blue Thumb, one of their most blues-oriented albums which features electric blues guitarist Albert Collins. The title track, "The Hunter", an Albert King cover, reached No. 37 in the R&B singles chart. The album peaked at No. 47 on the R&B albums chart and earned Tina her first solo Grammy nomination for Best R&B Vocal Performance, Female at the 12th Annual Grammy Awards.

In 1969, Ike and Tina began performing at rock festivals. They performed at the Newport Pop Festival in Northridge, the Seattle Pop Festival in Woodinville, and the Gold Rush rock music festival in Amador County. In November 1969, Ike and Tina reportedly upstaged the Rolling Stones as the opening act on their 1969 US Tour. Tina emerged as a sex symbol and was praised for sensuality on stage. Their erotic performance of "I've Been Loving You Too Long", filmed during a concert at Madison Square Garden, is featured in the Rolling Stones' 1970 documentary Gimme Shelter. During a concert at Madison Square Garden, Janis Joplin joined the Turners on stage for an impromptu performance of "Land of 1000 Dances." Ike and Tina added rock songs by the Rolling Stones and the Beatles to their repertoire, which was receptive among crowds. Their new label, Minit Records, responded by rushing the release of a studio version of "Come Together".

=== 1970–1976: Mainstream success ===
In January 1970, Ike and Tina performed on The Ed Sullivan Show. Their performance of "Bold Soul Sister" propelled the single to No. 22 on the R&B chart. In March, their single "Come Together" peaked at No. 21 on the R&B chart. Due to the success of their singles, they were signed to Minit's parent label Liberty Records. In April 1970, their first album on Liberty, Come Together, was released, reaching No. 13 on the R&B albums chart. Their next single "I Want to Take You Higher" originally by Sly and the Family Stone was released in May 1970. It charted higher on the Billboard Hot 100 than the original. The revue's performance fee increased from $1,000 a night to $5,000 a night following their successful run. In July, they headlined the Newport Jazz Festival in Rhode Island and the Schaefer Music Festival at New York's Central Park. That Summer, they were featured in the Isley Brothers concert film It's Your Thing and they filmed Miloš Forman's Taking Off (1971). In October 1970, they headlined the Soul Bowl at Tulane University's Sugar Bowl Stadium; a concert to raise money for disadvantaged minority students. Later that year, they made their first trip to Asia to perform in Siam, China, Japan, and the Philippines.

Ike and Tina began performing Creedence Clearwater Revival's "Proud Mary" during their shows in 1969. Ike wasn't fond of the original version, but he liked the cover version by Checkmates, Ltd. Ike and Tina released their version on the album Workin' Together in November 1970. Set at first to a slow acoustic rendition sung softly by both Ike and Tina, the song then transformed into a frenetic rock and soul dervish led by Tina and the Ikettes. The single was released in January 1971, reaching No. 4 on the Hot 100 and No. 5 on the R&B chart. It sold more than a million copies, becoming the duo's best-selling single to date and won them a Grammy Award for Best R&B Vocal Performance by a Group at the 14th Annual Grammy Awards. Workin' Together became their most successful studio album, peaking at No. 25 on the Billboard 200. It includes the duo's social conscious title track, "Workin' Together", "Funkier Than A Mosquita's Tweeter" penned by Tina's sister Alline Bullock, and notable covers such as "Get Back" and "Let It Be" by the Beatles.

Tina is more convincing when she's growling out Ike's songs about her sexual appetites (I sure couldn't handle her) than when she's belting out Ike's songs about the social fabric.

— Christgau's Record Guide: Rock Albums of the Seventies (1981)

In January 1971, Ike and Tina embarked on a European tour that included dates at Midem in Cannes, the Palais d'Hiver in Lyon, and the Olympia in Paris. Their performances received rave reviews. The conservative Le Monde described Ike and Tina as "the voice of desire". Their concert at the Olympia was recorded and released as the album Live In Paris. While in Paris the Turners received the French Jazz Academy Soul award.

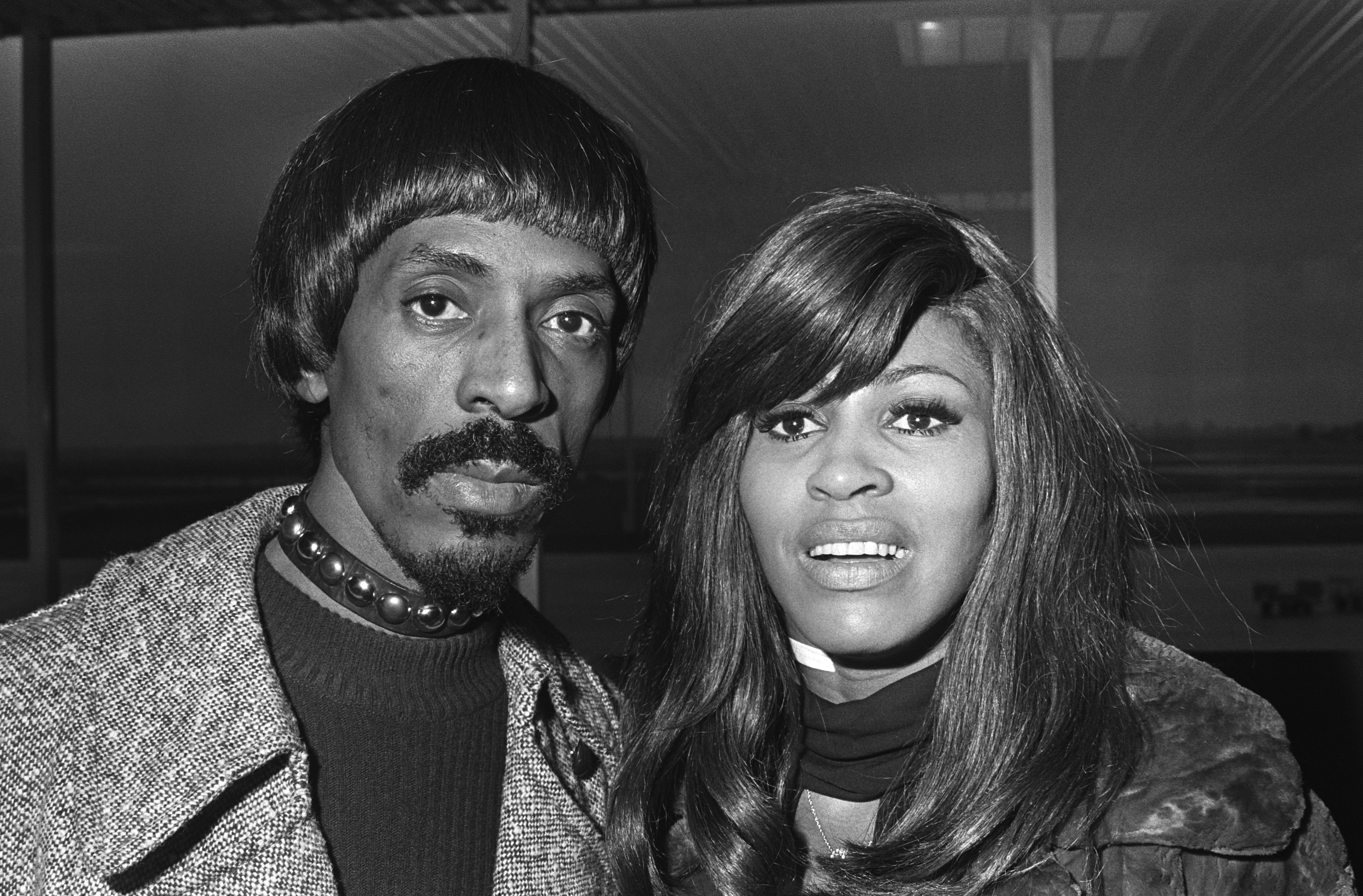
Ike & Tina Turner arriving at Amsterdam Airport Schiphol in 1971

Ike and Tina participated in the concert celebrating Ghana's 14th Independence Day on March 6, 1971. The concert was filmed and released as Soul To Soul in theaters in August 1971. The following month the soundtrack Soul To Soul was released which featured the Turners. The album peaked at No. 10 on the Billboard Soul LP's chart. In May 1971, Ike and Tina were the opening act for Johnny Mathis at Caesars Palace in Las Vegas; performing for the first time in a main showroom at the hotel. Earlier in the year Liberty Records was absorbed into United Artists Records, where Ike and Tina would remain as a duo. Their first release for the label was the live album, What You Hear Is What You Get, recorded during their concert at Carnegie Hall in April 1971. It peaked at No. 25 on the Billboard 200 and No. 7 on the R&B chart. The album was certified Gold by the RIAA in 1972. In July 1971, Ike and Tina filmed a concert during the Schaefer Music Festival at Central Park. It aired as Good Vibrations from Central Park on ABC-TV in August 1971. Also in 1971, they had a top 40 R&B hits with "Ooh Poo Pah Doo" and "I'm Yours (Use Me Anyway You Wanna)". In November 1971, Ike and Tina released the album 'Nuff Said. Around this time, the Kings of Rhythm were renamed the Family Vibes.

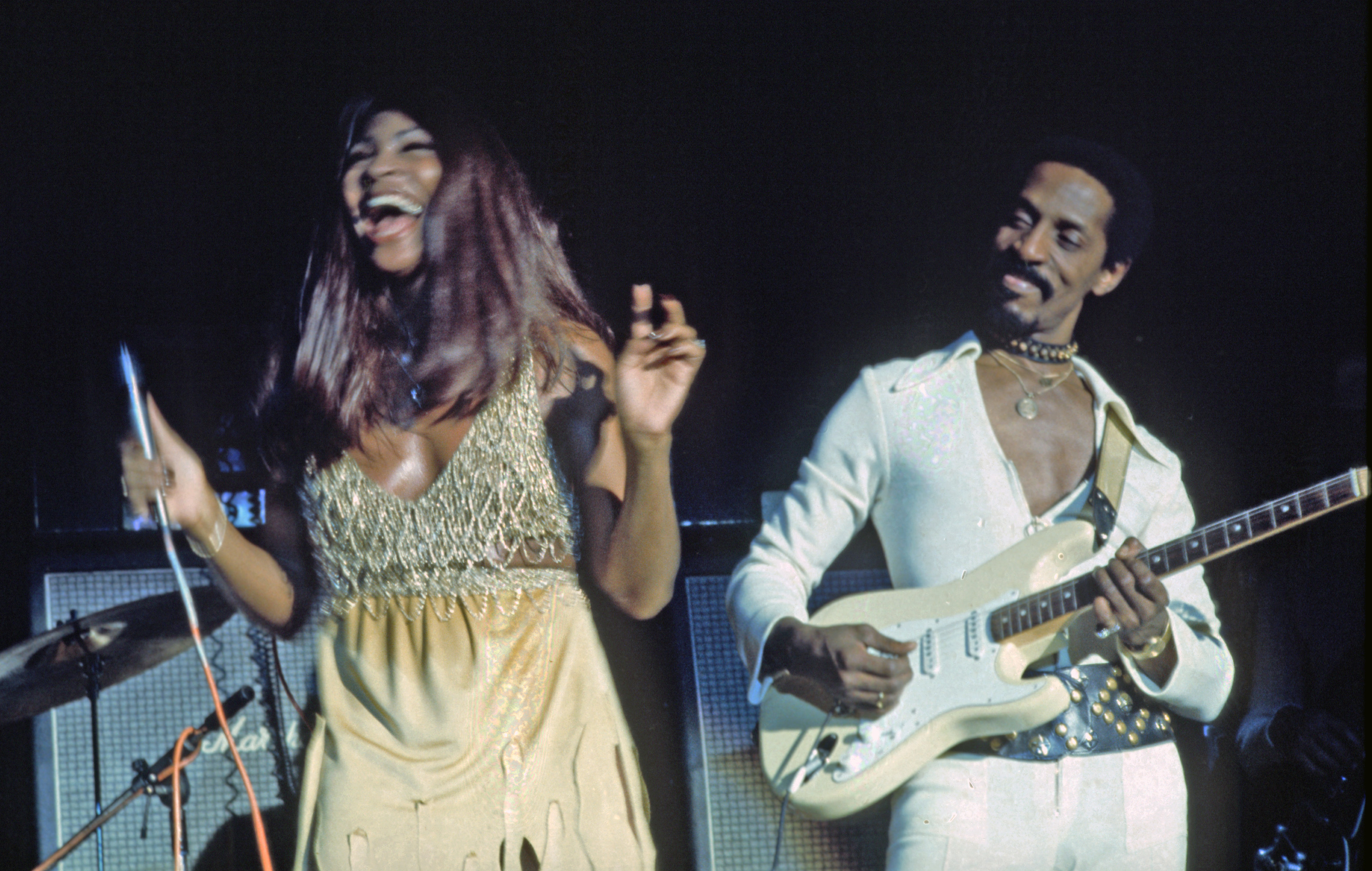
Ike & Tina Turner performing at Musikhalle Hamburg in Hamburg, 1972

In February 1972, the Turners officially opened their recording studio, Bolic Sound, to the public. The facilities had already been in use for Turner productions since 1970. A few months later they released the album Feel Good. Nine out of the ten tracks on the album were written by Tina. In August, they performed at Nassau County's first major rock festival, Festival of Hope Rockfest, at Roosevelt Raceway to benefit crippled children. In October, they performed "It's Gonna Work Out Fine" on The Tonight Show Starring Johnny Carson, which was included on the album Here's Johnny: Magic Moments From the Tonight Show. The duo had moderate R&B chart success with the Tina penned "Up in Heah" in 1972 and a cover of Little Richard's "Early One Morning" in 1973.

In August 1973, they released their hit record "Nutbush City Limits" which was written by Tina. It peaked at No. 22 on the Billboard Hot 100 and No. 11 on the R&B chart. The single was even more successful in Europe, reaching No. 4 in the UK and No. 1 in Austria. It was also a top 5 hit in several other countries. On September 1, 1973, the Ike & Tina Turner Revue performed at Monticello Raceway in Monticello, New York, breaking the single-night attendance record with a crowd of 15,313.

In 1974, the Turners received the Golden European Record Award, the first ever given, for selling more than one million records of "Nutbush City Limits" in Europe. Their follow-up singles "Sweet Rhode Island Red" and "Sexy Ida" did well on the R&B chart and in Europe.

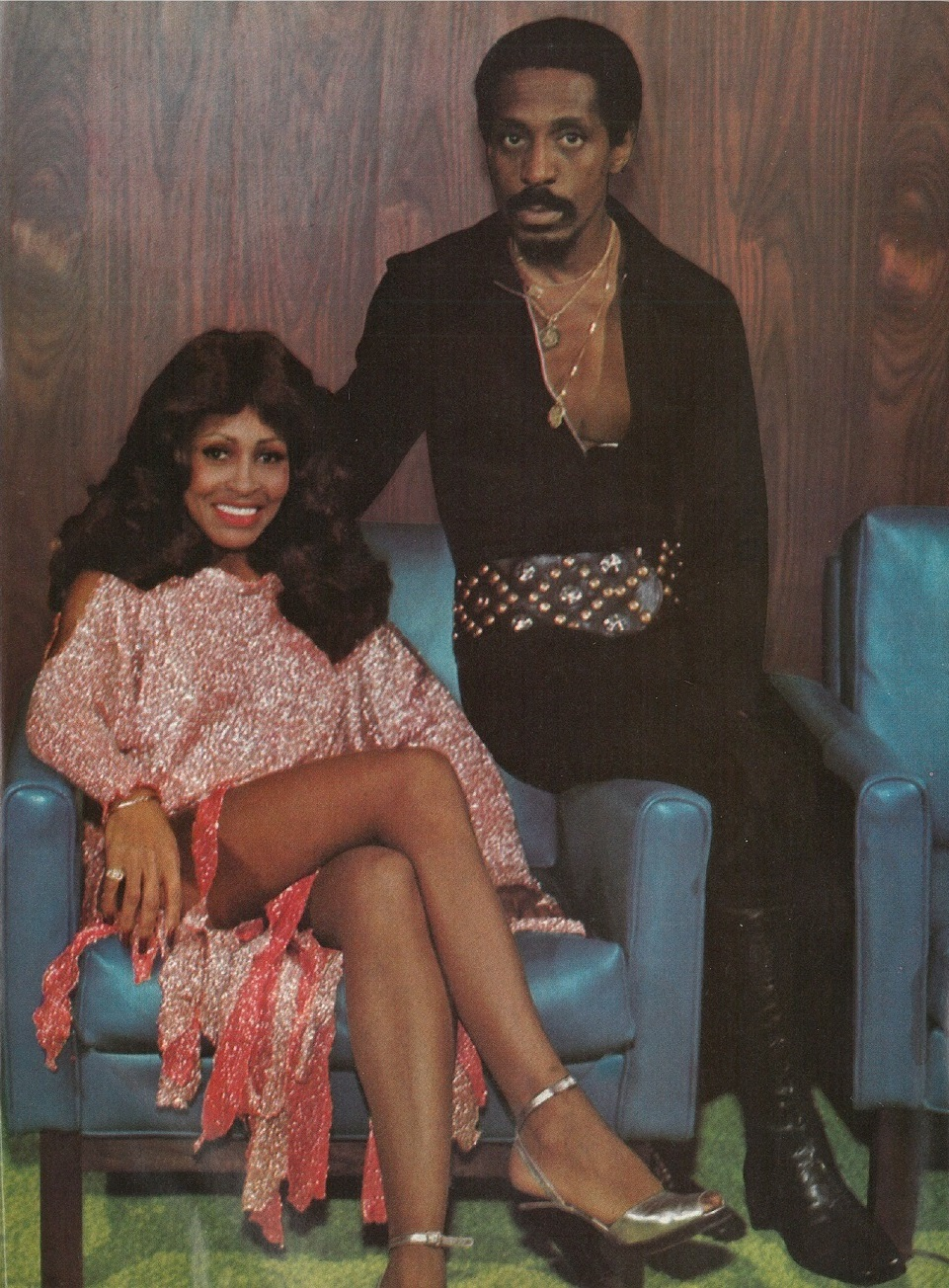
Ike & Tina Turner in 1973. Photo published in Black Stars (January 1974)

In April 1974, Ike and Tina released the album The Gospel According to Ike & Tina Turner. A few months later in September, Tina released her first solo album titled Tina Turns the Country On!. Both albums received Grammy nominations at the 17th Annual Grammy Awards. Their gospel album was nominated for Best Soul Gospel Performance. Ike also earned a solo nomination for his single "Father Alone". Tina was nominated for Best R&B Vocal Performance, Female for her solo album.

In 1975, the revue began billing themselves as the Ike & Tina Turner Explosion. In February 1975, it was announced that Gerhard Augustin, co-founder of Beat-Club and former head of A&R at United Artists in Munich, became Ike and Tina's manager. He had previously co-produced a few of their singles and the album Feel Good (1972). In 1975, Tina starred as the Acid Queen in the rock opera film Tommy. To capitalize off her publicity surrounding the film, a solo album by Tina was released titled Acid Queen. The lead single "Baby, Get It On" became the duo's last charting single together, peaking at No. 31 on the R&B chart. It was a hit in Europe where the Turners had a strong following, reaching No. 20 in Belgium and No. 9 in the Netherlands.

In September 1975, Ike and Tina were co-headliners at the Newport Pop Festival—a March of Dimes benefit—at Orange Coast College Stadium in Costa Mesa. In January 1976, they embarked on their second Australian concert tour. In March 1976, they headlined at the Waldorf Astoria in New York City. They also signed a deal with CBS-TV for nine television shows revolving around the Ike & Tina Turner Revue with the possibility of it becoming a regular series.

=== 1976–1978: The end of the duo ===
By 1976, Ike's cocaine addiction had caused a hole in his nasal septum, leading to nosebleeds from which he would relieve himself by using more of the drug. Ike was planning for them to leave United Artists for a new record company, Cream Records, for a reported annual amount of $150,000. The contract had a key person clause, meaning they would have to sign it in four days, keeping Tina contractually tied to Ike for five more years.

On July 1, 1976, the Ike & Tina Turner Revue flew from Los Angeles to Dallas, Texas, where they had a gig at the Dallas Statler Hilton, and en route to the hotel, the Turners got into a physical altercation in the car. Shortly after their arrival, Tina fled from Ike with only 36 cents and a Mobil gas card to the nearby Ramada Inn across the freeway. On July 27, 1976, Tina filed for divorce on the grounds of irreconcilable differences. Years later Ike claimed in his 1999 autobiography, Takin' Back My Name: The Confessions of Ike Turner, that Tina initiated their final fight by purposely irritating him so that she would have a reason to break up with him before they were scheduled to sign their new contract.

Their divorce was finalized on March 29, 1978, and in the settlement, Tina gave Ike her share of their Bolic Sound recording studio, publishing companies, real estate, and he kept his four cars. Tina retained her songwriter royalties from songs she had written, but Ike received the publishing royalties for his compositions and hers. She also kept her two Jaguars, furs and jewelry along with her stage name. Tina took responsibility for the debts incurred from their missed concert dates as well as an IRS lien.

United Artists responded to the abrupt split by finishing albums from their last recording sessions, releasing Delilah's Power (1977) and Airwaves (1978). In 1980, Ike released the single "Party Vibes"/"Shame, Shame, Shame" taken from The Edge (1980). The single peaked at No. 27 on the Billboard Disco Top 100 chart. After Tina's resurgence as a solo artist in the mid-1980s, compilation albums containing unreleased material were released, including Get Back (1985) and Gold Empire (1985). Get Back reached No. 189 on the Billboard Top Pop Albums chart.

In her 1986 autobiography I, Tina: My Life Story, she alleged that Ike had abused her throughout their marriage. She said, "It was my relationship with Ike that made me most unhappy. At first, I had really been in love with him. Look what he'd done for me. But he was totally unpredictable." Ike later admitted he took Tina for granted and called her "the best woman I ever knew." In his book, he said: "Sure, I've slapped Tina. We had fights and there have been times when I punched her to the ground without thinking. But I never beat her." In a 1999 interview, Roseanne Barr urged him to publicly apologize to Tina on The Roseanne Barr Show. In 2007, Turner told Jet that he had written Tina an apology letter, but had never sent it. In 2018, Tina told The Sunday Times that "as an old person, I have forgiven him, but I would not work with him. He asked for one more tour with me, and I said, 'No, absolutely not.' Ike wasn't someone you could forgive and allow him back in."

== Awards and nominations ==
Ike & Tina Turner were inducted into the Rock & Roll Hall of Fame in 1991, and the St. Louis Classic Rock Hall of Fame in 2015. They've each received a star on the St. Louis Walk of Fame. Tina received a star on the Hollywood Walk of Fame in 1986. She is also inducted into the SoulMusic Hall of Fame, the Memphis Music Hall of Fame, the Rock & Roll Hall of Fame and the Rhythm and Blues Hall of Fame as a solo artist. Additionally, she is a 2005 recipient of the Kennedy Center Honors. Ike is inducted into the Blues Hall of Fame, the Rhythm and Blues Music Hall of Fame, the Mississippi Musicians Hall of Fame, and Hollywood's RockWalk.

Ike & Tina Turner received the following awards:

- 1971: Top Duo of the Year for their single "Proud Mary" from Hit Parade
- 1971: Top Duo (Singles) from Record World DJ Poll
- 1971: Best Duo from NATRA (The National Association of Television and Radio Announcers)
- 1971: French Jazz Academy Soul Award
- 1971: Prix Otis Redding from the Académie du Jazz for best R&B album (Workin' Together)
- 1974: Golden European Record Award, the first ever given for selling over one million records of "Nutbush City Limits"

=== Grammy Awards ===
Ike & Tina Turner won a Grammy Award for "Proud Mary" in 1972. Two of their songs, "River Deep – Mountain High" and "Proud Mary" were inducted to the Grammy Hall of Fame in 1999 and 2003, respectively. Tina won an additional seven Grammys as a solo artist; Ike won one as a solo artist in 2007. Tina received the Grammy Lifetime Achievement Award in 2018.

Year	Nominee / work	Award	Result
1962	Ike & Tina Turner – "It's Gonna Work Out Fine"	Best Rock & Roll Recording	Nominated
1970	Tina Turner – The Hunter	Best Female R&B Vocal Performance	Nominated
1970	Ike Turner – A Black Mans Soul	Best R&B Instrumental Performance	Nominated
1972	Ike & Tina Turner – "Proud Mary"	Best R&B Vocal Performance by a Group	Won
1975	Tina Turner – Tina Turns The Country On!	Best Female R&B Vocal Performance	Nominated
1975	Ike Turner – "Father Alone"	Best Soul Gospel Performance	Nominated
1975	Ike & Tina Turner – The Gospel According to Ike & Tina	Best Soul Gospel Performance	Nominated

==== Grammy Hall of Fame ====
Year	Nominee / work	Award	Result
1999	"River Deep – Mountain High"	Hall of Fame (Single)	Inducted
2003	"Proud Mary"	Hall of Fame (Single)	Inducted

=== Living Blues Awards ===
Year	Nominee / work	Award	Result	Ref.
2014	Ike and Tina Turner, On the Road 1971-72	Best Blues DVD of 2013	Won	
2017	Ike & Tina Turner, The Complete Pompeii Recordings 1968-1969	Best Blues Album of 2016 (Reissue Recording)	Nominated	

== Rankings ==
- Rolling Stone ranked Proud Mary: The Best of Ike & Tina Turner No. 212 on their list of the 500 Greatest Albums of All Time (No. 214 on 2012 revised list)
- Rolling Stone ranked "River Deep, Mountain High" No. 33 on the list of the 500 Greatest Songs of All Time
- NME ranked "River Deep, Mountain High" No 37 of their list of the 500 Greatest Songs of All Time
- Rolling Stone ranked Ike & Tina Turner No. 2 on their list of the 20 Greatest Duos of All Time
- Pitchfork ranked River Deep – Mountain High No. 40 on their list of the 200 Best Albums of the 1960s

=== Billboard ===
Billboard Year-End charts are a cumulative measure of a single or album's performance in the United States, based upon the Billboard magazine charts.

Billboard Year-End Charts
Year	Chart	Song	Rank
1960	Year-End R&B Chart	"A Fool In Love"	3
1961	Year-End Hot 100 Singles	"It's Gonna Work Out Fine"	65
1961	Year-End R&B Chart	"It's Gonna Work Out Fine"	2
1970	Year-End Hot 100 Singles	"I Want to Take You Higher"	79
1971	Year-End Hot 100 Singles	"Proud Mary"	55

=== Cash Box ===
Cash Box magazine was a weekly publication devoted to the music and coin-operated machine industries which was published from July 1942 to November 16, 1996. It was one of several magazines that published charts of song popularity in the United States. In 1961, they began a year-end survey compiled from their weekly Top 100 Best Seller list.

Cash Box Annual Year-End Survey
Year	Nominee / work	Award	Rank	Ref.
1961	Ike & Tina Turner	Best New Vocal Groups (R&B)	1	
1961	Ike & Tina Turner	Best Newcomers Vocal Group (Singles)	17	
1961	Ike & Tina Turner – "It's Gonna Work Out Fine"	Top 50 R&B Singles	5	
1961	Ike & Tina Turner – "I Idolize You"	Top 50 R&B Singles	48	
1962	Ike & Tina Turner	Best Vocal Groups (Singles)	10	
1962	Ike & Tina Turner	Best Vocal Groups (R&B)	2	
1962	Ike & Tina Turner – "Poor Fool"	Top 50 R&B Singles	17	
1964	Ike & Tina Turner	Best Vocal Groups (R&B)	22	
1965	Ike & Tina Turner	Best Vocal Groups (R&B)	25	
1966	Ike & Tina Turner	Best Vocal Groups (R&B)	24	
1969	Ike & Tina Turner	Best Duos (R&B)	5	
1970	Ike & Tina Turner	Top Duos	5	
1970	Ike & Tina Turner	Top Duos (R&B)	2	
1971	Ike & Tina Turner – "Proud Mary"	Top 100 Chart Hits of 1971	56	
1971	Ike & Tina Turner – "Proud Mary"	Top 100 R&B Hits of 1971	32	
1971	Ike & Tina Turner – "Proud Mary"	Top 10 Songs of March 1971	9	
1971	Ike & Tina Turner – "Proud Mary"	Top 10 Songs of April 1971	9	
1971	Ike & Tina Turner	Top Duos (albums)	3	
1971	Ike & Tina Turner	Best Duos (Singles)	2	
1971	Ike & Tina Turner	Best Duos (R&B)	1	
1972	Ike & Tina Turner	Best Duos (R&B)	3	
1973	Ike & Tina Turner	Best Duos (Singles)	3	
1973	Ike & Tina Turner	Best Vocal Groups (R&B)	26	
1974	Ike & Tina Turner	Best Duos (Singles)	7	
1975	Ike & Tina Turner	Best Vocal Groups (R&B)	44	

=== Record World ===
Record World magazine (1946–1982) was one of the three main music industry trade magazines in the United States, along with Billboard and Cash Box. The Record World Awards were an annual award given to most successful artists in the US.

Record World Awards
Year	Nominee	Award	Rank	Ref.
1969	Ike & Tina Turner	Most Promising Duo (Album)	1	
1971	Ike & Tina Turner	Top Duo Singles	2	
1971	Ike & Tina Turner	Top Duo (Album)	2	
1972	Ike & Tina Turner	Top Duo R&B	2	
1973	Ike & Tina Turner	Top Duo R&B of the Year	1	
1974	Ike & Tina Turner	Top Vocal Duo (Album)	1	
1974	Ike & Tina Turner	Top Vocal Duo (R&B Singles)	1	

== Selected discography ==
=== Studio albums ===
- 1961: The Soul of Ike & Tina Turner
- 1962: Dynamite!
- 1963: Don't Play Me Cheap
- 1963: It's Gonna Work Out Fine
- 1966: Get It – Get It
- 1966: River Deep – Mountain High
- 1968: So Fine
- 1969: Outta Season
- 1969: Cussin', Cryin' & Carryin' On
- 1969: The Hunter
- 1970: Come Together
- 1970: Workin' Together
- 1971: 'Nuff Said
- 1972: Feel Good
- 1973: Let Me Touch Your Mind
- 1973: Nutbush City Limits
- 1974: The Gospel According to Ike & Tina
- 1974: Sweet Rhode Island Red
- 1977: Delilah's Power

=== Live albums ===
- 1964: Ike & Tina Turner Revue Live
- 1965: Live! The Ike & Tina Turner Show
- 1967: The Ike & Tina Turner Show (Vol. 2)
- 1969: In Person
- 1970: Festival of Live Performances
- 1971: What You Hear Is What You Get—Live at Carnegie Hall
- 1971: Live In Paris
- 1973: Live! The World of Ike & Tina

=== Compilation albums ===
- 1965: The Greatest Hits of Ike & Tina Turner
- 1966: The Soul of Ike & Tina
- 1976: Greatest Hits
- 1978: Airwaves
- 1985: Get Back
- 1985: Golden Empire
- 1988: Ike & Tina Turner's Greatest Hits, Volume 2
- 1991: Proud Mary: The Best of Ike & Tina Turner
- 1997: Bold Soul Sister: The Best of the Blue Thumb Recordings
- 2000: The Kent Years
- 2002: Funkier Than a Mosquito's Tweeter
- 2004: His Woman, Her Man: The Ike Turner Diaries
- 2007: The Ike & Tina Turner Story: 1960–1975
- 2016: The Complete Pompeii Recordings 1968–1969

=== Video albums ===
- 1986: The Ike & Tina Turner Show
- 1999: The Best of MusikLaden Live
- 2004: The Legends Ike & Tina Turner Live in '71
- 2009: Nutbush City Limits

== Filmography ==
- 1965: The Big T.N.T. Show
- 1970: Gimme Shelter
- 1970: It's Your Thing
- 1971: Soul To Soul
- 1971: Taking Off
- 1971: Good Vibrations from Central Park
- 1975: Poiret est à vous
- 2012: Ike & Tina On The Road: 1971–72

== Sources ==
- Turner, Ike; Cawthorne, Nigel (1999). Takin' Back My Name: The Confessions of Ike Turner. Virgin Books. ISBN 978-0-7432-0120-9. "Takin' Back My Name: The Confessions of Ike Turner."
- Gulla, Bob (January 16, 2008). Icons of R&B and Soul, Vol. 1: An Encyclopedia of The Artists Who Revolutionized Rhythm. ABC-CLIO. ISBN 978-0-31334-044-4.
- Turner, Tina (1986). I, Tina: My Life Story. New York: Avon Books. ISBN 0-380-70097-2.
