= Art Lassiter =

American singer (1928–1994)

Background information
- Born: January 27, 1928; North Carolina, US
- Died: August 4, 1994 (aged 66) Seattle, Washington, US
- Genres: R&B
- Occupation: Singer
- Instrument: vocals
- Years active: 1950s–1960s

Arthur Lassiter (January 27, 1928 – August 4, 1994) was an American singer, known for his work with Ike Turner.

== Early life ==
Lassiter was born in 1928 in North Carolina. His parents were cotton sharecroppers, and Lassiter began singing after joining his uncles' gospel group. At the age of 14, he moved to Newark, New Jersey, to live with his mother, who had moved there for work. While in Newark, Lassiter performed with the Jubilaires.

Lassiter married his first wife, Neaty Ann (née Butler), with whom he had two children.

Lassiter later joined the United States Army and served during the Korean War. While stationed in the Far East, he performed in officers' clubs and took up boxing, competing under the name Artie Wilkins (taking his step-father's surname).

== Recording career ==
After leaving active service, Lassiter returned to the United States. During a cross-country drive, he broke down in St. Louis. While there he sang at an amateur club night, and was given a permanent booking. He often sang covers of Ray Charles songs, and formed The Bel-Airs with brothers George and Murrey Green and Douglas Martin. By late 1955, the band renamed themselves The Trojans and recorded with RPM Records, backing Ike Turner's Kings of Rhythm. The group backed Turner again the following February, this time on Federal Records under the name of The Rockers.

Turner offered Lassiter a place in his Rhythm Revue, where he subsequently met and worked with Sam Cooke and Albert Cook. In March 1960, Turner chose Lassiter to front his Kings of Rhythm. Lassiter's trio of backup singers — Robbie Montgomery, Frances Hodges, and Sandra Harding – were called The Artettes, and eventually formed the foundation of The Ikettes. Turner wrote "A Fool in Love" specifically for Lassiter, but Lassiter failed to turn up to the recording session at Technisonic Studios in St. Louis. Tina Turner—then going by the stage name Little Ann—knew the song from rehearsal sessions and recorded a guide track to act as a demo. Lassiter's failure to appear for the session was after Turner lent him money, which he didn't pay back. This financial dispute ended their partnership.

== Later life and death ==
Lassiter later became an active member of the Black Panthers in San Mateo, California, and studied alternative history with Huey P. Newton and Eldridge Cleaver, before relocating to Hawaii in 1970. He owned a club called Destiny in Honolulu until 1975 when he was hospitalized for 14 months due to pancreas failure. Lassiter moved to Japan then New Zealand and eventually ended up in Canada where he began performing again. After Lassiter and his band were deported from Vancouver, he performed as a solo act in Bellingham, Washington.

Lassiter settled in Washington with his second wife Thelma Lassiter and three children Christine, Arthur Jr., and Lydia. During this time Art performed at many local blues festivals and local venues acquiring a substantial local following in the 1980s.

Lassiter spent his final years with his third wife, Ruth Lindgren and two children Miriam and Linnea. He died in Seattle from throat cancer on August 4, 1994.

Lassiter also had a son, Andre Montgomery (1961–1995), with his former background vocalist Robbie Montgomery. Lassiter's grandson, Andre Montgomery Jr., later starred in the reality television series Welcome to Sweetie Pie's. He was murdered in 2016 in a plot believed to have orchestrated by Tim Norman, Montgomery's son from a later relationship. In September 2022, Norman was tried and convicted for the murder.

== Discography ==
- 1955: The Trojans, Ike Turner & Orch. – "As Long As I Have You" / "I Wanna Make Love To You" (RPM 446)
- 1956: The Rockers – "Why Don't You Believe" / "Down in the Bottom" (Federal 12273)
- 1958: Art Lassiter – "Just One Cure for the Blues" / "Too Late For Tears" (Ballad 1024)
- 1961: Art Lassiter – "It's All Right" / "Just Another Day in the Life of a Fool" (Ballad 5025)
- 1962: Art Lassiter – "It's Alright" / "Mr. Loneliness" (Symbol 912)
- 1962: Art Lassiter – "Sum'n Nother" / "Baby's Cry" (Marbo N80W-0677)
