= Poor Fool =

Single by Ike & Tina Turner

from the album Dynamite!
- B-side: "You Can’t Blame Me"
- Released: November 1961
- Length: 2:25
- Label: Sue Records
- Songwriter: Ike Turner
- Producer: Ike Turner

Ike & Tina Turner singles chronology
"It's Gonna Work Out Fine" (1961)	"Poor Fool" (1961)	"Tra La La La La" (1962)

"Poor Fool" is a song written and produced by Ike Turner. It was released by Ike & Tina Turner on Sue Records in 1961.

== Release ==
"Poor Fool" is the second single from Ike & Tina Turner's 1962 album Dynamite!. An earlier version of the song, "A Fool Too Long," was released in 1960. "Poor Fool" was released as the follow-up to the Grammy nominated single "It's Gonna Work Out Fine" in November 1961. The record became the duo's second hit record of the year. They promoted it on American Bandstand in January 1962 which helped propel the single to No. 38 on the Billboard Hot 100 and No. 4 on the R&B chart. The song was also included in their 1963 album It's Gonna Work Out Fine.

The B-side track "You Can't Blame Me" was taken from their debut album The Soul of Ike & Tina Turner.

== Critical reception ==
Cash Box (November 18, 1961):

Ike & Tina Turner come thru in sensational follow-up (to "It's Gonna Work Out Fine") fashion with this new Sue slice. It's a pounding, chorus-backed rock-a-cha-cha, tabbed "Poor Fool," that vocalist Tina and maestro Ike deck out with sock, dual-mart sales authority. Should spread like wild fire in the days to come. Flip's a fetching thump-a-rhythm entry that highlites a delightful vocal duet by Ike & Tina.

== Track listing ==
All tracks are written by Ike Turner.

No.	Title	Length
1.	"Poor Fool"	2:25
2.	"You Can't Blame Me"	2:05

== Chart performance ==
=== Weekly charts ===
Chart (1962)	Peak position
US Billboard Hot 100	38
US Billboard Hot R&B Sides	4
US Cash Box Top 100	23
US Cash Box Top 50 R&B	5

=== Year-end charts ===
Chart (1962)	Rank
US Cash Box Top R&B Records	17
