= Club Manhattan =

Nightclub in Illinois, United States

- Interactive map of Club Manhattan
- Coordinates: 38.6165°N 90.1521°W
- Owner: Booker Merritt
- Type: Nightclub

Construction
- Demolished: 2010

The Club Manhattan was a nightclub at 1320 East Broadway in East St. Louis, Illinois. The venue was owned by Booker Merritt. The Club Manhattan has a prominent place in Greater St. Louis music history. It is best known for being the nightclub where singer Tina Turner met her future husband, bandleader Ike Turner.

== History ==
In 1954, Ike Turner relocated his band, the Kings of Rhythm, from Clarksdale, Mississippi to East St. Louis, Illinois. There he met a man named Booker Merritt who owned a building at 1320 East Broadway. Turner and his band gut renovated the building and created the Club Manhattan where they would practice and perform.

The Club Manhattan was initially a predominantly African-American tavern. Turner later played at the white nightclubs in St. Louis such as the Club Imperial, and soon gained a large following from white teenagers. Turner's competition in the St. Louis club scene was musician Chuck Berry who once brought bluesman Muddy Waters to watch Turner perform. Other musicians who performed at the Club Manhattan include Little Milton, Oliver Sain, and Albert King.

In May 1955, six men were arrested at the Club Manhattan on vice charges. Merritt was also arrested on gambling charges after authorities raided the nightclub while a dice game was in progress. In September 1955, two men were arrested after they injured each other in a gunfight outside of the Club Manhattan.

As a teenager, Tina Turner (then called Ann Bullock) frequented the club to watch Ike Turner and his Kings of Rhythm perform. She recalled that she "almost went into a trance" the first time she saw Turner perform. East St. Louis poet laureate Eugene Redmond recalled that in the 1950s Tina Turner was a "teeny-bopper and a groupie." She used to hang around the Club Manhattan while Turner was practicing. Turner's band was very popular and he had a strong following of female admirers. One night in 1956, Bullock was given the microphone by his drummer Eugene Washington during an intermission and she sang the B.B. King blues ballad, "You Know I Love You." Impressed by her voice, Turner added her as a featured vocalist with his Kings of Rhythm and they later formed the duo Ike & Tina Turner in 1960.

Tina Turner a song titled "Club Manhattan," on the Ike & Tina Turner album Nutbush City Limits (1973) as an homage to the nightclub.

In 1968, Albert King was performing at the Club Manhattan when promoter Bill Graham offered him $1,600 to play three nights at The Fillmore Auditorium in San Francisco.

The club had various name changes over the years but was last known as the Four Aces. In later years, it housed a liquor store in the front and a bar in the back. The other half of the building was a club. The Disco Riders, a 32-member motorcycle club, owned and operated the club. According to the Riverfront Times, the building was located at 1312 Broadway and was vacant when it was destroyed by a fire in 2010. However, various articles and advertisements from the 1950s list the address of the Club Manhattan as 1320 East Broadway.
