= Juggy Murray =

American record label owner, producer, singer-songwriter (1923–2005)

- Born: Henry Murray Jones Jr. November 24, 1923; Charleston, South Carolina, U.S.
- Died: February 8, 2005 (aged 81) The Bronx, New York, U.S.
- Occupations: Record-label owner, producer, singer-songwriter
- Labels: Sue, Symbol, Crackerjack, Eastern, Juggy, Jupiter

Juggy Murray (November 24, 1923 – February 8, 2005) was an American record label owner, producer and singer-songwriter. He co-founded Sue Records which launched the career of Ike & Tina Turner. Subsidiary labels under Sue were: Symbol, Broadway, Eastern and Crackerjack. Murray recorded artists Don Covay, Jimmy McGriff, Inez Foxx, and Baby Washington, as well as releasing solo records.

== Life and career ==
Murray was born in Charleston, South Carolina and raised in Hell's Kitchen in Manhattan. His nickname, "Juggy", derived from his near-blind grandfather, who would ask Murray to bring his favorite jug and fill it up with liquor.

Murray worked in real estate in Harlem before he and producer Bobby Robinson co-founded Sue Records in 1957. Initially, they intended to sell R&B music to the African American community in New York, but in 1958 with "Itchy Twitchy Feeling" by Bobby Hendricks was a Top 40 hit on the Billboard Hot 100.

In 1960, Murray signed Ike & Tina Turner to Sue Records. He offered a $25,000 advance for a four-year contract after hearing their demo. Their debut single, "A Fool in Love", peaked at No. 2 on the R&B chart and crossed over into Hot 100. Their success continued with a string of hits, including "I Idolize You," "It's Gonna Work Out Fine," and "Poor Fool." Murray even managed them for a period. In 1962, Ike & Tina Turner along with Placid Music Corporation sued Murray, Sue Records and Sue's publishing affiliate Saturn Music for breach of contract and royalties.

In 1962, Murray signed Barbara George to the label. He paid $25,000 for her contract from A.F.O. Records. A.F.O. Records were distributed by Sue. As the Sixties progressed, Sue's sub labels produced hits such as "Mockingbird" by brother-and-sister duo Inez & Charlie Foxx and "She Blew a Good Thing" by The Poets on Symbol Records. In July 1965, Murray signed guitarist Jimi Hendrix to an exclusive two-year contract to Sue Records, but no recordings were released.

Sue was originally licensed by Decca Records and issued on London Records until 1963. When Murray reached an agreement with Chris Blackwell, founder of Island Records. to issue Sue US recordings under a new Sue Records imprint in the UK. Some time after a breach of contract involving Sue Records UK issuing recordings that were not affiliated with Sue Records (US), Murray terminated their agreement and returned to Decca in 1966. In 1968, Murray took a $100,000 loan from United Artists that was secured by Sue assets. After failing to pay off the debt, United Artists assumed ownership of Sue Records masters and Saturn Music publishing. He also lost the "Sue building" which consisted of offices and Juggy Sound Studio in Manhattan.

Murray moved to California and recorded a few singles. In the 1970s, he launched Juggernaught and Jupiter Records. He released his debut album Inside America on his Jupiter label in 1976, which was popular on the UK dancefloors. The title track made the Top Forty in Britain. That album was followed by Rhythm and Blues in 1977. He continued to work into the new millennium, producing and promoting up and coming artists. Speaking of Baby Washington, Murray once said, "I would rather record her than eat."

== Death ==
Murray died on February 8, 2005, at Montefiore Medical Center in Bronx, New York. Though Murray was 81 and suffering from Parkinson's disease, he and Baby Washington had been working on recording comeback material.

== Discography ==
=== Albums ===
- 1976: Inside America (Jupiter 1101)
- 1977: Rhythm And Blues (Jupiter 1402)

=== Singles ===
- 1966: "Soul At Sunrise" / "Just A Minute" (Sue 45-140/142)
- 1969: "Oily" / "The Spoiler" (SUE 9)
- 1970: "Buttered Popcorn" / "Thock It To Me Honi" (SUE 14)
- 1972: "Built For Speed (Part 1 And 2)" / "Built For Speed (Part 1)" (Pony 1A / 1B)
- 1976: "Inside America — Pt. I" / "Inside America — Pt. II" (Jupiter JUP-902)
- 1976: "Disco Extraordinaire (Part I)" / "Disco Extraordinaire (Part II)" (Jupiter JUP-903)
