= You Know I Love You (B. B. King song) =

Single by B.B. King and his Orchestra

from the album Singin' the Blues
- B-side: "You Didn't Want Me"
- Released: September 1952
- Genre: Blues
- Length: 3:07
- Label: RPM Records
- Songwriter: B.B. King

B.B. King and his Orchestra singles chronology
"Some Day Some Where" (1952)	"You Know I Love You" (1952)	"Story from My Heart and Sou" (1952)

"You Know I Love You" is a song written and recorded by B.B. King. Released on RPM Records in 1952, it was King's second No. 1 single on the Billboard R&B chart. King's friend and collaborator Ike Turner played piano on the original recording. The song was included on King's debut album Singin' The Blues in 1957.

"You Know I Love You" is noted for being the song that 17-year-old Tina Turner sang for Ike Turner at the East St. Louis nightclub Manhattan Club in 1957, which convinced him to let her sing in his band the Kings of Rhythm.

== Composition and release ==
"You Know I Love You" was one of B.B. King's favorite blues love ballads. The song is about King lamenting over a broken relationship. King recorded the track with his band, which features prominent use of horns and Ike Turner on piano. According to King and Joe Bihari, Turner had introduced King to the Bihari brothers while he was a talent scout at Modern Records.

"You Know I Love You" was released on Modern's subsidiary label RPM Records in September 1952. The single reached No. 1 on the Billboard R&B chart in November 1952; spending 18 weeks on the charts. It ranked No. 12 on Billboard's list of 1952's Top R&B Records according to retail sales and No. 7 according to juke box plays.

== Cover versions ==
Tina Turner recorded a blues rock version of song titled "(Darlin') You Know I Love You" for the 1993 soundtrack album What's Love Got to Do with It. The lyrics are different from the original version. Despite this, the track is still credited as written by King.

== Chart performance ==
Chart (1952)	Peak position
US Billboard R&B National Best Sellers	1
US Billboard R&B Most Played In Juke Boxes	2
