= Sue Records =

American record label

- Founded: 1957
- Founder: Juggy Murray and Bobby Robinson
- Status: Defunct
- Genre: R&B, rock and roll, pop
- Location: 265 West 54th Street; New York, New York, U.S.

Sue Records was also the name of a Louisiana-based record company which owned Jewel Records (Shreveport record label).

Sue Records ("The Sound of Soul") was an American record label founded by Henry 'Juggy' Murray and Bobby Robinson in 1957. Subsidiaries on the label were Symbol Records, Crackerjack Records, Broadway Records and Eastern Records. Sue also financed and distributed A.F.O. Records owned by Harold Battiste in New Orleans.

== History ==
In 1957, Juggy Murray partnered with Bobby Robinson to create Sue Records in New York City. The label's first release was "Vengeance (Will Be Mine)" by the Matadors later that year. Sue's first hit record came in 1958 with "Itchy Twitchy Feeling" by Bobby Hendricks which peaked at No. 25 on the Billboard Hot 100. Success continued into the sixties with a handful of singles by R&B duo Ike & Tina Turner between 1960 and 1962. "Mockingbird" by brother-and-sister duo Inez and Charlie Foxx was a hit on the subsidiary label Symbol in 1963. Sue also had hits on the charts with "Stick Shift" by the Duals, "Hurt by Love" by Inez Foxx and "That's How Heartaches Are Made" by Justine "Baby" Washington. Sue also released early recordings by the soul singer Don Covay and albums by the soul-jazz organist Jimmy McGriff. Guitarist Jimi Hendrix signed his first recording contract with Sue in 1965, but no recordings were released.

Murray initially released his records in the UK through Decca's London Records but switched to a licensing deal with Island Records in 1964. This deal resulted in a split in the ownership of the Sue name. Island used the label to distribute Sue in the UK. Problems began when Island also leased discs from other US labels that interested them and released them on UK Sue too - which was not in the agreement. Murray terminated the agreement and returned to Decca in 1966.

After failing to chart in the U.S., Murray sold the Sue masters to United Artists Records in 1968. A reissue of the "Harlem Shuffle" by Bob & Earl made the Top 10 in Britain in 1969. Murray retained rights to the Sue name and constantly attempted to re-activate the label until his death in 2005. The Sue Records catalog eventually ended up with EMI, and then with Universal Music Group upon EMI's being bought out in 2012.

EMI released a four-CD box-set The Sue Records Story: The Sound of Soul in 1994, while Ace Records later released four volumes of The UK Sue Label Story.

== Discography ==
Sue Records were best known for their R&B and Rock 'n' Roll singles but released a number of LPs between 1958 and 1966 featuring popular and jazz artists.

=== Sue LP-2000 Popular/R&B Series ===
Catalog No.	Album	Artist	Details
LP-2001	The Soul of Ike & Tina Turner	Ike & Tina Turner	
LP-2002	Stick Shift	The Duals	
LP-2003	Dance with Ike and Tina Turner and Their Kings of Rhythm	Ike & Tina Turner	instrumental album - Tina Turner does not sing on any tracks
LP-2004	Dynamite!	Ike & Tina Turner	
LP-2005	Don't Play Me Cheap	Ike & Tina Turner	
LP-2007	It's Gonna Work Out Fine	Ike & Tina Turner	

=== Sue LP/STLP-1000 Popular/Jazz Series ===
Catalog No.	Album	Artist	Details
LP-1011	Have Mood, Will Call	Will Davis Trio	
LP-1012/STLP-1012	I've Got a Woman	Jimmy McGriff	
LP-1013/STLP-1013	One of Mine	Jimmy McGriff	
LP-1014/STLP-1014	That's How Heartaches Are Made	Baby Washington	
LP-1015/STLP-1015	The New Sound of Ernestine Anderson	Ernestine Anderson	
LP-1016/STLP-1016	Groove House	Ray Bryant	
LP-1017/STLP-1017	Jimmy McGriff at the Apollo	Jimmy McGriff	
LP-1018	Christmas with McGriff	Jimmy McGriff	
LP-1019	Live at Basin Street East	Ray Bryant	
LP-1020/STLP-1020	Jimmy McGriff at the Organ	Jimmy McGriff	
LP-1021	The Sue Story	Various Artists	Compilation of singles - also released as Old Goodies
LP-1022/STLP-1022	I Can't Stand It	Soul Sisters	
LP-1023/STLP-1023	So Far Away	Hank Jacobs	
LP-1024/STLP-1024	Like Dixie, But...	Dick Vance and His Dixieland Kings	
LP-1025/STLP-1025	Speak Your Piece	Joe Thomas and Bill Elliott	
LP-1026	Scandal in Montego Bay	Percy Dixon and His Merry Boys	
LP-1027	Mockingbird	Inez Foxx	Reissue of Symbol 4400
LP-1028/STLP-1028	Jack and Julie	Jack Melady and Julius Ehrenwerth	Reissue of Sue LP-8000 Things with Strings
LP-1029/STLP-1029	Yours Truly Jack and Julie	Jack Melady and Julius Ehrenwerth	
LP-1030/STLP-1030	"Sweets" for the Sweet	"Sweets" Edison	
LP-1031/STLP-1031	Joan Shaw in Person	Joan Shaw	
LP-1032/STLP-1032	Cold Turkey	Ray Bryant	
LP-1033/STLP-1033	Topkapi	Jimmy McGriff	
LP-1034	I Have a Dream	The Juggy Murray Orchestra arranged by Fred Norman	
LP-1035/STLP-1035	Flip Phillips Revisited	Flip Phillips	
LP-1036/STLP-1036	Soul	Ray Bryant	
LP-1037/STLP-1037	Inez & Charlie Foxx	Inez and Charlie Foxx	
LP-1038/STLP-1038	The Greatest Hits of Ike & Tina Turner	Ike & Tina Turner	Compilation
LP-1039/STLP-1039	Blues for Mister Jimmy	Jimmy McGriff	
LP-1040	Another Step Forward	Spoken word album documenting civil rights speeches	
LP-1041/STLP-1041	Hits Au-Go-Go	Jimmy Oliver and the Soul Twisters	
LP-1042/STLP-1042	Only Those in Love	Baby Washington	
LP-1043/STLP-1043	A Toast to Jimmy McGriff's Greatest Hits	Jimmy McGriff	Compilation
LP-1044	In Sweden	Don Gardner and Dee Dee Ford	

=== Other Releases ===
- LP-3001: Thank You, Lord - National Independent Gospel Singers of Atlanta Georgia (1960)
- LP-8000: Things with Strings - Julie & Jack (1963)
- SSLP-8801: Let's Work Together - Wilbert Harrison

=== Selected singles ===
Catalog No.	Release date	US	US R&B	Single (A-side, B-side)	Artist
706	Jun 1958	25	5	"Itchy Twitchy Feeling" b/w "A Thousand Dreams"	Bobby Hendricks
730	Jul 1960	27	2	"A Fool In Love" b/w "The Way You Love Me"	Ike & Tina Turner
735	Nov 1960	82	5	"I Idolize You" b/w "Letter from Tina"	Ike & Tina Turner
745	Jun 1961	25		"Stick Shift" b/w "Cruising"	The Duals
749	Jun 1961	14	2	"It's Gonna Work Out Fine" b/w "Won't You Forgive Me"	Ike & Tina Turner
753	Nov 1961	38	4	"Poor Fool" b/w "You Can't Blame Me"	Ike & Tina Turner
757	Mar 1962	50	9	"Tra La La La La" b/w "Puppy Love"	Ike & Tina Turner
765	Jun 1965	89		"You Should'a Treated Me Right" b/w "Sleepless"	Ike & Tina Turner
767	Jul 1962	116	16	"A Handful Of Memories" b/w "Careless Hands"	Baby Washington
766	Aug 1962	96		"Send For Me (If You Need Some Lovin)" b/w "Bless You"	Barbara George
770	Oct 1962	20	5	"I've Got A Woman (Part I)" b/w "I've Got A Woman (Part II)"	Jimmy McGriff
777	Dec 1962	50	12	"All About My Girl" b/w "M.G. Blues"	Jimmy McGriff
783	Mar 1963	40	10	"That's How Heartaches Are Made" b/w "There He Is"	Baby Washington
795	Oct 1963	91	19	"So Far Away" b/w "Monkey Hips And Rice"	Hank Jacobs
799	Jan 1964	46	8	"I Can't Stand It" b/w "Blueberry Hill"	Soul Sisters
10-001	Apr 1964	79	19	"Kiko" b/w "Jumpin' At The Woodside"	Jimmy McGriff
45-129	May 1965	73	10	"Only Those In Love b/w "The Ballad Of Bobby Dawn"	Baby Washington
144	Jun 1966		41	"I Was Born A Loser" b/w "My Luck Is Bound To Change"	Bobby Lee
Sue 11	Jul 1969	32		"Let's Work Together (Part 1)" b/w "Let's Work Together (Part 2)"	Wilbert Harrison One Man Band

== Subsidiary labels ==
=== Symbol Records ===
Symbol was launched in 1958 and lasted until 1966. The label issued 47 singles and one album, most which were produced by Murray. Brother-and-sister duo Inez & Charlie Foxx were the label's most successful artist. Their hit single, "Mockingbird" reached No. 2 on the Billboard R&B chart and No. 7 Billboard Hot 100 in the summer of 1963. Inez Foxx had a few solo singles reach the charts. It wasn't until 1966, that another artist on the label had a hit record. "She Blew a Good Thing" by The Poets peaked at No. 45 on the pop chart and No. 2 on the R&B chart. Artist who recorded on the label include King Coleman, Art Lassiter, the Hollywood Flames, the Shockettes, and the Parliaments.

==== Albums ====
- 1963: Inez Foxx – Mockingbird

==== Selected singles ====
Catalog No.	Release date	US	US R&B	UK	Single (A-side, B-side)	Artist	Notes
900	Dec 1958				A: "The Chicken Scratch" B: "June's Blues"	The Commandos	Billboard review (Feb 9, 1959)
901	Jan 1959				A: "So Loved Am I" B: "Cute Little Girl"	Jesse Johnson	Billboard review (Jan 26, 1959)
909	Aug 1960				A: "Shortnin' Bread" B: "Let's Shimmy"	King Coleman	
912	1962				A: "It's Alright" B: "Mr. Loneliness"	Art Lassiter	
919	Jun 1963	7	2		A: "Mockingbird" B: "Jaybirds"	Inez & Charlie Foxx	
922	Sep 1963	113			A: "He's The One You Love" B: "Broken Hearted Fool"	Inez Foxx	Bubbling Under Hot 100 (Nov 2, 1963)
924	Oct 1963	96	34		A: "Hi Diddle Diddle" B: "Talk With Me"	Inez Foxx	
926	Dec 1963	91	28		A: "Ask Me" B: "I See You My Love"	Inez Foxx	
20001	Apr 1964	54	12	40	A: "Hurt By Love" B: "Confusion"	Inez Foxx	
201	Sep 1964	124			A: "La De Da I Love You" B: "Yankee Doodle Dandy"	Inez & Charlie Foxx	
296	Mar 1965				A: "I Feel Alright" B: "My Momma Told Me"	Inez & Charlie Foxx	Cash Box review (Mar 12, 1965)
214	Feb 1966	45	2		A: "She Blew A Good Thing" B: "Out To Lunch"	The Poets	

=== Crackerjack Records ===
Crackerjack was launched in 1961 and released its last record in 1964. Artist on that label included The Spy Dels, Ike Turner's Kings Of Rhythm, Eddie Carlton, Linda And The Del Rios, Pearl Woods, The Dramatics, Derek Martin, Chuck Leonard, and Betty Green.

=== Eastern Records ===
Eastern was launched in 1964 and lasted until 1966. The label produced the singles "The Real Thing" by Tina Britt which reached No. 20 on the R&B chart in 1965, and "Time Waits For No One" by Eddie & Ernie which reached No. 34 on the R&B chart in 1965. Geraldine Jones, Johnny Starr, and Duke Daniels also recorded on the label.

=== Broadway Records ===
Singles were released on Broadway between 1964 and 1966. Artists on the label included Tommy Andre, Johnson Sisters, Ocie Smith, Sandra Phillips, The Inverts, Johnny Burton, and The Thieves.

== See also ==
- List of record labels
- Sue Records artists with Wikipedia pages
