= Audrey Madison Turner =

American singer and songwriter (born 1958)

- Born: Audrey Madison c. 1958; San Francisco, California, U.S.
- Other name: Audrey Turner
- Occupations: Singer-songwriter, choreographer
- Spouse: Ike Turner (m. 2006; div. 2007)

Audrey Madison Turner is an American singer and songwriter known for her collaborations with musician Ike Turner. Madison was one of Turner's backup singers before she became his lead singer, they married in 2006. She was a contestant on The X Factor USA in 2011.

== Life and career ==
Audrey Madison was born in San Francisco to Art and Georgia Madison. Due to her mother's bipolar disorder/psychosis and the loss of her father who was a functioning alcoholic, she and her siblings were forced to rear themselves. Madison participated in beauty contests and talent shows at an early age, eventually debuting an original song at her high school graduation. She abandoned her plans to become a psychologist in order to pursue her musical ambitions, founding the musical group Madison Avenue with her family.

Madison appeared in various talent search competitions and talk shows, including The Carol Vitale Show and on Natalie Cole's Big Break. She became the assistant choreographer to Lon Fontaine of Motown, creating routines for artists such as Aretha Franklin, the Temptations, and the Pointer Sisters.

Madison met Ike Turner through a mutual friend in 1993. She started out as an Ikette before becoming his lead singer. Madison provided vocals on Turner's 1996 album, My Bluescountry. She was compared to Turner's ex-wife and former singing partner Tina Turner. In 1999, Madison joined the band Black Angel which included Ike & Tina Turner's son Ronnie Turner.

Madison and Ike Turner received positive reviews for their performances at various music festivals: SXSW (2001), Montreux Jazz Festival (2002), North Sea Jazz Festival (2002), and Jazz à Vienne (2004). Madison became Turner's 14th wife when they married at A Special Memory Wedding Chapel in Las Vegas on October 8, 2006. Turner filed for divorce two months later on December 22, 2006, but after the divorce was granted they reconciled before his death. Turner died on December 12, 2007, without a valid will. Less than a week after his death, Madison filed a petition stating that he had penned a handwritten will naming her as a beneficiary. In 2009, a judge ruled that it was invalid and by law his children were the direct heirs of his estate. That year, Madison provided vocals on a tribute album for Turner titled Rocket 88: Tribute to Ike Turner, released on Zoho Roots.

Madison appeared as a contestant on The X Factor in 2011. In 2016, she released a memoir titled Love Had Everything to Do with It. The book details her volatile relationship with Ike Turner which she attributed to his bipolar disorder and schizophrenia. She told The Afro: "I decided to write it because it was like a cleansing and it released all of the trauma. Also, I wanted the general public to have a better outlook and perspective on where Ike was mentally and emotionally, because so often, as a nation, we turn on people who have mental health issues and define them by their behaviors rather than their condition."

Madison has a son, Maurion Henderson, from a previous relationship.

== Discography ==
=== Albums ===
- 2019: I'm Here

=== Vocal credits ===
- 1990: Let It Flow – Art Madison
- 1991: Spillin' The Beans – Jellybean
- 1993: Into The A.M. – Art Madison
- 1996: My Bluescountry – Ike Turner
- 2002: The Resurrection: Live Montreux Jazz Festival – Ike Turner's Kings Of Rhythm
- 2007: Risin' With The Blues – Ike Turner
- 2009: Rocket 88: Tribute To Ike Turner – Mr. Groove Band

== Books ==
- Love Had Everything to Do With It: My Life with Ike Turner, A True Story (2016)
