= I Like Ike! The Best of Ike Turner =

Compilation album by Ike Turner
- Released: November 15, 1994
- Recorded: 1951–1972
- Genres: Blues; R&B; instrumental
- Label: Rhino
- Producers: Ike Turner, Sam Phillips, Gerhard Augustin

Ike Turner chronology
The Edge (1980)	I Like Ike! The Best of Ike Turner (1994)	Here and Now (2001)

I Like Ike! The Best of Ike Turner is a compilation album released by Rhino Records in 1994. The album spotlights musician Ike Turner's work as a bandleader, pianist, guitarist, and solo artist, "concentrating heavily on his work in the 1950s and early '60s."

== Content ==
I Like Ike! The Best Of Ike Turner was released a year after the biopic What's Love Got to Do with It where Turner was portrayed negatively, resulting in intense media scrutiny. The album highlights Turner's musical contributions, featuring original recordings of his work with various featured vocalist and accompanying musicians, beginning with "Rocket 88" in 1951 up until "You're Still My Baby" from Turner's 1972 album Blues Roots. The album also contains Tina Turner's first recording "Boxtop," released in 1958.

The song "Takin' Back My Name," originally released by Turner as a non-album track in 1970, was later used for the title of his 1999 autobiography.

== Critical reception ==
Professional ratings
Review scores
Source	Rating
AllMusic	4.5/5 stars
Christgau's Record Guide	A−

Reviewing the album in Christgau's Consumer Guide: Albums of the '90s, Robert Christgau wrote:

Hardly the last major rock and roller to brutalize women, Turner gets short-changed by history partly because his best-known victim was so major herself and partly because his specialty was collaboration. Sadly, Rhino's licensing whizzes failed to secure his Federal sides, depriving us of both his rawest singer — Billy Gayles, the real Screamin' Jay Hawkins — and his most primordial guitar. And leaving a lean, mean bandleader whose ear for the permanent novelty only began with "Rocket '88'" – as did everything else.

== Track listing ==
All tracks written by Ike Turner except where noted.

No.	Title	Writer(s)	Length
1.	"Rocket 88" (Jackie Brenston & His Delta Cats)		2:06
2.	"My Real Gone Rocket" (Jackie Brenston & His Delta Cats)		2:27
3.	"I Miss You So" (Dennis Binder & His Orchestra)		3:00
4.	"Hoo-Doo Say" (The Sly Fox)	Jo Jo Adams	2:54
5.	"Peg Leg woman" (Willie King with The Ike Turner Band)		2:27
6.	"I'm On Your Trail"
7.	"I Know You Don't Love Me"
8.	"Boxtop" (Ike Turner, Carson Oliver & Little Ann)		2:07
9.	"Matchbox (Version B)" (Ike Turner's Kings of Rhythm)		2:25
10.	"Down & Out" (Ike Turner's Kings of Rhythm)		3:05
11.	"Ho---Ho" (credited to Icky Renrut, alias for Ike Turner)
12.	"Hey---Hey" (credited to Icky Renrut, alias for Ike Turner)
13.	"Prancing" (Ike Turner's Kings of Rhythm)		3:49
14.	"Steel Guitar Rag" (Ike Turner's Kings of Rhythm)		2:48
15.	"Consider Yourself" (Stacy Johnson)	Drake Coleman	2:40
16.	"The New Breed, Pt. 2" (Ike Turner's Kings of Rhythm)		2:30
17.	"Takin 'Back My Name"	Leah Graham	2:15
18.	"You're Still My Baby"	Chuck Willis	2:47
