= His Woman, Her Man: The Ike Turner Diaries =

Compilation album by Ike Turner
- Released: May 4, 2004
- Recorded: 1970–1973
- Studio: Bolic Sound (Inglewood, CA)
- Genre: Soul
- Label: Funky Delicacies
- Producer: Ike Turner

Ike Turner chronology
Here and Now (2001)	His Woman, Her Man: The Ike Turner Diaries (2004)	Risin' with the Blues (2006)

Ike & Tina Turner chronology
Funkier Than a Mosquito's Tweeter (2002)	His Woman, Her Man: The Ike Turner Diaries (2004)	The Ike & Tina Turner Story: 1960–1975 (2007)

Professional ratings
Review scores
Source	Rating
AllMusic	4.5/5 stars

His Woman, Her Man: The Ike Turner Diaries — Unreleased Funk/Rock 1970–1973 is a collection of previously unreleased Ike & Tina Turner tracks as well as some alternative versions of original songs.

The album features a few duets between Ike and Tina such as the track "It's Groovier Across The Line," a reworked version of "Country Girl - City Man" by Billy Vera & Judy Clay. Ike and Tina performed the song as "City Girl, Country Man" on In Concert in 1974.

== Critical reception ==
Reviewing His Woman, Her Man for AllMusic, Thom Jurek wrote:

Here are some of the first ARP synthesizer and drum machine tracks ever recorded and the way Turner utilizes them, we can hear the later sounds of the P-Funk organization as well as later Earth, Wind & Fire, Lonnie Liston Smith, and Herbie Hancock's funk-jazz directions...The sound of the ARP and drum machine — in 1971! — on traditional blues tracks like "I've Got My Mojo Workin'," and Berry Gordy's "Money," turns the originals inside out and rocks them up...Wilder still are Ike's own "He Makes Me Want to Holler," with an unmistakable gospel chorus, steep funky backbeat, and the ARP put through a wah wah pedal!...Tina's voice is in its prime here, as evidenced by the opener "Can't Find My Mind," and "Baby Get It On," which were originally written for the Rolling Stones — who never recorded them.

== Reissues ==
His Woman, Her Man was reissued by Tuff City Records in 2016.

== Track listing ==
All tracks written by Ike turner, except where noted.

No.	Title	Writer(s)	Length
1.	"Can't Find My Mind"		2:57
2.	"I'll Be Anyway You Want Me To Be"		2:59
3.	"He Makes Me Holler" (Different version of the single "Golden Empire")		3:45
4.	"Proud Mary (The Funky Version)" (Lead vocals by Ike & Tina)	John Fogerty	2:45
5.	"Only We Women Bleed"	Alice Cooper, Dick Wagner	3:57
6.	"It's Groovier Across The Line" (Lead vocals by Ike & Tina)	Chip Taylor, Ted Daryll, Ike Turner	2:32
7.	"I've Got My Mojo Working"	Preston Foster	3:20
8.	"Baby Get It On" (Lead vocals by Ike & Tina)		3:14
9.	"Brain Game"		3:58
10.	"I Woke Up This Morning"		2:56
11.	"Baby Makes Me Feel Good" (Different version of the single "Feel Good")		3:34
12.	"Sit And Hold Your Hand"	Robey	2:37
13.	"He's Mine"		2:47
14.	"You Ain't Enough For Two"		3:05
15.	"Ya Ya"	Lee Dorsey, Clarence Lewis, Morgan Robinson, Morris Levy	2:55
16.	"Money"	Janie Bradford, Berry Gordy	2:39
17.	"Don't Believe Nothing" (Lead vocals by Ike & Tina)		3:19
