= Risin' with the Blues =

Studio album by Ike Turner
- Released: September 12, 2006
- Studio: Studio West, Proxy Recording, Signature Sound, Track Entertainment Studios
- Genre: Blues
- Length: 53:50
- Label: Zoho Roots
- Producer: Ike Turner Jr., Roger Nemour

Ike Turner chronology
His Woman, Her Man: The Ike Turner Diaries (2004)	Risin' with the Blues (2006)	Jack Rabbit Blues – The Singles of 1958–1960 (2011)

Risin' with the Blues is the final studio album released by American musician Ike Turner. The album was released in the United States on September 12, 2006. It was produced by his son, Ike Turner Jr., and Roger Nemour. The album received positive reviews and won the Grammy Award for Best Traditional Blues Album.

== Critical reception ==
Professional ratings
Review scores
Source	Rating
AllMusic	3.5/5 stars
All About Jazz	5/5 stars

Senior contributor of All About Jazz, C. Michael Bailey, rated the album five stars and wrote:

There is nothing remotely retro about the music or its production. Turner seamlessly updates the music with which he has been associated for fifty years, advancing the causes of Robert Cray, Little Milton, Otis Rush and Buddy Guy with burping electric bass, sinewy lead guitars and horns aplenty.

Reviewing the album for AllMusic, Jonathan Widran wrote:

The real joys of this disc are his scorching guitar energy, followed by his jumpy boogie-woogie piano. It's pretty much a funky and humor-laden bluesfest throughout, from his funked-up update of "Gimme Back My Wig" to the shuffling blues of "Tease Me." He finds a balance between tongue in cheek attitudes (as on the retitling of "Five Long Years" to "Eighteen Long Years," a reference to his marriage to Tina) with more heartfelt touches on softer songs like "A Love Like Yours." He also ventures into spirited New Orleans territory on "Goin' Home Tomorrow" and offers a prayer of forgiveness for his countless lifelong sins by declaring that "Jesus Loves Me."

== Awards and nominations ==
Risin' with the Blues won Turner his first solo Grammy for Best Traditional Blues Album at the 49th Annual Grammy Awards. The album earned Turner a nomination for best Blues Album at the 7th Annual Independent Music Awards.

== Track listing ==
Risin' with the Blues track listing
No.	Title	Writer(s)	Length
1.	"Gimme Back My Wig"	Ike Turner	3:37
2.	"Caldonia"	Louis Jordan	2:57
3.	"Tease Me"	Ike Turner	3:47
4.	"Goin' Home Tomorrow"	Fats Domino	3:05
5.	"Jazzy Fuzzy"	Ike Turner, Lenny Rankins	4:20
6.	"I Don't Want Nobody"	Ike Turner	3:43
7.	"Jesus Loves Me"	Ike Turner	3:57
8.	"A Love Like Yours"	Holland–Dozier–Holland	3:26
9.	"Senor Blues"	Horace Silver	4:25
10.	"Eighteen Long Years"	Eddie Boyd	3:16
11.	"Rockin' Blues"	Ike Turner	4:38
12.	"After Hours"	Erskine Hawkins	5:00
13.	"Big Fat Mama"	Ike Turner	3:54
14.	"Bi Polar"	Ike Turner	3:46
Total length:			53:50

== Personnel ==
Ike Turner: lead vocals, guitar, piano

Audrey Madison: background vocals on track 7

The Kings of Rhythm:

- Mack Johnson, Leo Dombecki, Ryan Montana – horns
- Seth Blumberg, Joe Kelly – guitars
- Kenny Frizelle – harp
- Lenny "Fuzzy" Rankins – guitar on track 5
- Paul Smith, Ernest Lane – keyboards
- Kevin Cooper – bass
- Bill Ray, Matt Long, Harry Jen Frizelle – drums
