= Nutbush City Limits (album) =

Studio album by Ike & Tina Turner
- Released: November 1973
- Recorded: June – September 1973
- Studio: Bolic Sound (Inglewood, California)
- Genre: Rock; soul
- Length: 32:37
- Label: United Artists
- Producer: Ike Turner

Ike & Tina Turner chronology
| Live! The World of Ike & Tina (1973) | Nutbush City Limits (1973) | The Gospel According to Ike & Tina (1974) |

Singles from Nutbush City Limits
- 1. "Nutbush City Limits" Released: August 1973; 2. "River Deep, Mountain High 1974" Released: March 1974

Nutbush City Limits is a studio album by Ike & Tina Turner, released on United Artists Records in 1973. The album is noted for the hit single "Nutbush City Limits", which became a staple in their live shows.

== Recording and release ==
Nutbush City Limits was recorded at Ike & Tina Turner's Bolic Sound studio between June and September 1973. Five of the ten tracks on the album were written by Tina Turner, including "Nutbush City Limits", which peaked at No. 11 on Billboard Hot Soul Singles, No. 22 on the Billboard Hot 100, and No. 4 on the UK Singles Chart. She wrote the song "Club Manhattan" as an ode to the Manhattan Club, the nightclub where she met Ike Turner in East St. Louis, Illinois.

The album includes a different version of their classic song "River Deep – Mountain High", which was released as a single in France. The song "Make Me Over" was re-recorded by Tina and re-titled "Tina's Wish" for the 1993 soundtrack album What's Love Got to Do with It.

The album peaked at No. 21 on the Billboard Soul LP chart and No. 163 on the Top LPs.

== Critical reception ==
Professional ratings
Review scores
| Source | Rating |
|---|---|
| AllMusic | 4.5/5 stars |
| Christgau's Record Guide | B+ |

The album received positive critical reception. Billboard reviewed it as "simply the best thought-out Ike & Tina album in many moons." Cash Box noted that "this album is one of the best dance LPs of the year and features Tina's singing at its best as well as lke's capable leadership."

Record World (December 1, 1973): "The title cut is a big single for the torrid Turners and they have filled out their new album with plenty of red hot rock and soul on songs like 'River Deep, Mountain High', 'Drift Away', 'Club Manhattan' and 'Make Me Over'. Ike's production is so hot you'll need an asbestos needle."

== Reissues ==
The album was reissued by Raven Records on the compilation CD Nutbush City Limits/Feel Good in 2006.

== Track listing ==
Side A
| No. | Title | Writer(s) | Length |
|---|---|---|---|
| 1. | "Nutbush City Limits" | Tina Turner | 2:55 |
| 2. | "Make Me Over" | Ike Turner | 3:05 |
| 3. | "Drift Away" | Mentor Williams | 3:20 |
| 4. | "That's My Purpose" | Tina Turner | 4:38 |
| 5. | "Fancy Annie" | Tina Turner | 2:20 |

Side B
| No. | Title | Writer(s) | Length |
|---|---|---|---|
| 1. | "River Deep, Mountain High" | Phil Spector, Jeff Barry, Ellie Greenwich | 4:02 |
| 2. | "Get It Out of Your Mind" | Ike Turner | 3:20 |
| 3. | "Daily Bread" | Tina Turner | 2:45 |
| 4. | "You Are My Sunshine" | Charles Mitchell, Jimmie Davis | 3:22 |
| 5. | "Club Manhattan" | Tina Turner | 2:50 |
| Total length: | | | 32:37 |

== Chart performance ==
Chart performance for Nutbush City Limits
| Chart (1974–1975) | Peak position |
|---|---|
| Australia (Kent Music Report) | 13 |
| Austria (Ö3 Austria Top 40) | 4 |
| Germany (GfK Entertainment charts) | 21 |
| US Billboard Top LP's | 163 |
| US Billboard Soul LP's | 21 |
| US Cash Box Top 100 Albums 101–175 | 134 |
| US Record World R&B LP | 26 |

== Certifications ==
Certifications for Nutbush City Limits
| Region | Certification | Certified units/sales |
|---|---|---|
| Australia (ARIA) | Platinum | 50,000^{^} |
^{^} Shipments figures based on certification alone.
