= Farther Along (song) =

Song with music by Jesse Randall Baxter, Jr.

- Sheet music and lyrics for gospel song Farther Along.
- Key: D major
- Genre: Gospel

"Farther Along" is an American Southern gospel song of disputed authorship. The song deals with a Christian's dismay at the apparent prosperity of the wicked, when contrasted with the suffering of the righteous. The repeated theme is that, "farther along" (in Heaven, perhaps), the truth will be revealed.

== History ==
There are several attributions for the authorship of this song. The oldest known print edition is in the 1911 Church of God hymnal Select Hymns for Christian Worship and General Gospel Service; its only attribution is "Arr. B. E. W.", referring to the hymnal editor Barney E. Warren.

Farther Along
A rendition of Farther Along, performed by the Million Dollar Quartet during the Sun Session.

In 1937 the Stamps-Baxter Music Company included the song in their Starlit Crown collection and several subsequent collections. The Stamps-Baxter version was set to a new musical arrangement by Gospel composer and publisher J. R. Baxter, and was initially credited "As sung by the Burnette Sisters". W. B. Stephens, a Church of God preacher, heard the song on the radio and contacted Stamps-Baxter claiming to be the author of the song. After further correspondence, Stamps-Baxter credited Stephens as the song's author in subsequent publications. Most versions of the song published today use the Stamps-Baxter arrangement and also credit Stephens as the song's author.

In 2008, a user named James Greer posted an alternative history of the song on Wikisource. He claimed that his grandfather, an itinerant preacher named W. A. Fletcher, wrote the song while travelling in the Indian Territories near the end of 1911. According to Greer, Fletcher wrote the song as a reflection of his sadness that he would not be present for the birth of his first-born child, as he felt his priorities were with his mission to the Indian Territories. J. R. Baxter was sitting next to Fletcher on the train, and was quite taken with the lyrics; he offered Fletcher $2.00 for them and then had them put to music. This version of the song's origin was copied to Wikipedia without further citation, and from there became commonly accepted across the Internet.

Other people who have been credited with authorship of the song include W. E. Lindsey (Eureka Sacred Carols, 1921) and W. P. Jay (Sing Out!, 1960s).

== Covers ==
"Father Alone"
- German picture sleeve

Single by Ike Turner

from the album The Gospel According to Ike & Tina
- B-side: "Take My Hand, Precious Lord"
- Released: July 1974
- Recorded: October – November 1973
- Studio: Bolic Sound (Inglewood, California)
- Genre: Gospel
- Length: 4:17
- Label: United Artists Records
- Songwriter: S. Taylor
- Producer: Ike Turner

Ike Turner singles chronology
"Dust My Broom" (1972)	"Father Alone" (1974)	"Party Vibes" (1980)

"Farther Along" has been covered by numerous artists over the years, including The Flying Burrito Brothers, who recorded the song on their 1970 album Burrito Deluxe, and The Byrds, who covered it as the title track of their 1971 album Farther Along.

Ike Turner released a version titled "Father Alone" as a single from the Ike & Tina Turner album The Gospel According to Ike & Tina in 1974. His rendition was nominated for a Grammy Award for Best Soul Gospel Performance.

The song has also been recorded by Hank Williams, Glen Campbell, Florida Boys, Van Dyke Parks, Pete Seeger, Roy Acuff, Johnny Cash, Sam Cooke, Elvis Presley, Mississippi John Hurt, Bill Anderson, Ellen McIlwaine, Smoking Popes, Josh Garrels, Brad Paisley and the Million Dollar Quartet among others.

In 1987, Dolly Parton, Linda Ronstadt and Emmylou Harris recorded an arrangement by John Starling and Emmylou Harris for the album Trio. Dolly Parton herself recorded a solo version on her 1999 album, Precious Memories.

In 2009, Ronnie Milsap covered the song on his gospel album, Then Sings My Soul. In 2011, Josh Garrels re-arranged the song for his album Love & War & The Sea In Between.
