= The Edge (Ike Turner album) =

Studio album by Ike Turner featuring Tina Turner and Home Grown Funk
- Released: 1980
- Studio: Bolic Sound, Inglewood, California
- Label: Fantasy
- Producer: Ike Turner

Ike & Tina Turner chronology
Airwaves (1978)	The Edge (1980)	Nice 'N' Rough: The Later Greater Hits of Ike & Tina & The Ikettes (1984)

Ike Turner chronology
Bad Dreams (1973)	The Edge (1980)	Here and Now (2001)

Singles from The Edge
- 1. "Party Vibes" Released: 1980; 2. "Shame, Shame, Shame" Released: 1982

The Edge is a studio album by Ike Turner, released on Fantasy Records in 1980. It was released two years after Turner's divorce from his musical partner Tina Turner.

== Recording and release ==
The Edge contains songs taken from Ike & Tina Turner's recording sessions together. Tina Turner sings lead on the recordings on Side A, which include pop-rock hits such as "Only Women Bleed" by Alice Cooper and "Philadelphia Freedom" by Elton John. The B Side contains Ike Turner singing his compositions. The promotional single, "Party Vibes"/"Shame, Shame Shame", charted at No. 27 on the Billboard Disco Top 100 chart in 1980. In 1982, the cover song "Shame, Shame, Shame" was released as a single in the Netherlands, charting at No. 47.

After Tina Turner released her successful Private Dancer album, Fantasy reissued Side A of The Edge as a mini-album in 1984. The cover song, "Lean on Me" by Bill Withers, was released as a single in 1984.

== Critical reception ==
Reviewing the Tina Turner mini-album for Billboard, Nelson George noted that Turner's "interpretations of two Bill Withers classics "Lean on Me" and "Use Me," were the stand out tracks". He added that on "Lean On Me", Tina, "with more than a little help from Ike's clever rearrangement, turns Withers' mid-tempo tribute to friendship into a frenzied gospel song".

== Track listing ==
Side A
No.	Title	Writer(s)	Length
1.	"Shame, Shame, Shame"	Sylvia Robinson	3:03
2.	"Lean on Me"	Bill Withers	3:36
3.	"Philadelphia Freedom"	Elton John, Bernie Taupin	4:12
4.	"Use Me"	Bill Withers	3:12
5.	"Only Women Bleed"	Alice Cooper, Dick Wagner	3:57

Side B
No.	Title	Writer(s)	Length
1.	"Party Vibes"	Ike Turner	4:39
2.	"Lum Dum"	Ike Turner	3:35
3.	"No Other Woman"	Ike Turner	3:34
4.	"I Can't Believe It"	Ike Turner	3:35
5.	"I Don't Want Nobody"	Ike Turner	3:45

== Chart performance ==
Single (A-side, B-side)	Year	Peak chart positions	
Single (A-side, B-side)	Year	US Dance	Netherlands
"Party Vibes"/"Shame, Shame Shame"	1980	27	—
"Shame, Shame, Shame" b/w "Party Vibes"	1982	—	47
"—" denotes a recording that did not chart or was not released in that country.
