= Ike Turner =

American musician (1931–2007)

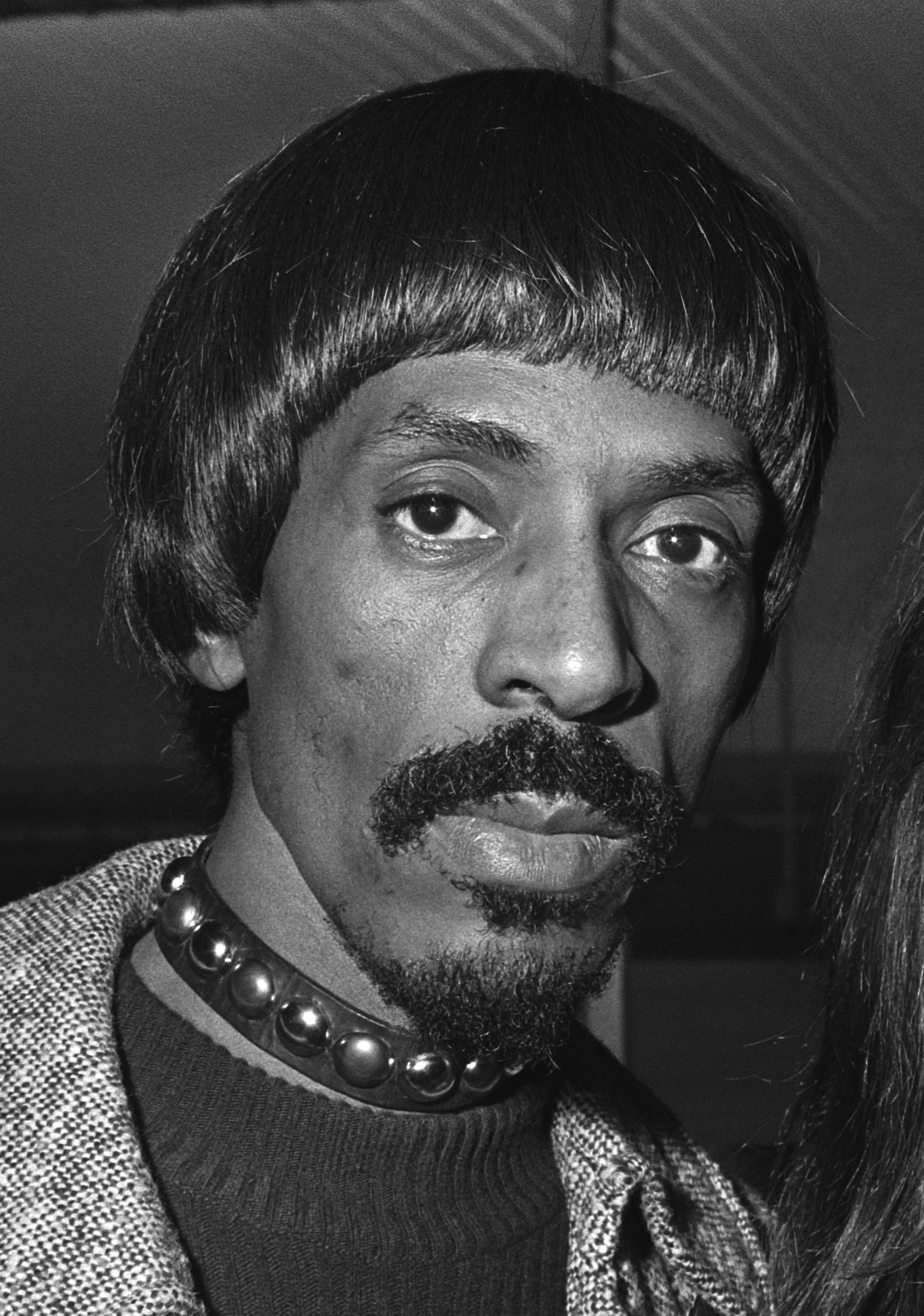
- Turner in 1971

Background information
- Also known as: Ike Wister Turner; Icky Renrut; Lover Boy
- Born: Izear Luster Turner Jr. November 5, 1931; Clarksdale, Mississippi, U.S.
- Died: December 12, 2007 (aged 76) San Marcos, California, U.S.
- Genres: Rock and roll; blues; R&B; soul; funk rock
- Occupations: Musician; record producer; talent scout; bandleader; songwriter
- Instruments: Guitar; keyboards; vocals
- Years active: 1940s–2007
- Labels: Chess; Cobra; Flair; Federal; King; Modern; RPM; Sun; Sue; Sonja; Innis; Pompeii; Liberty; United Artists; Fantasy; Zoho Roots
- Formerly of: Kings of Rhythm; Ike & Tina Turner

Izear Luster "Ike" Turner Jr. (November 5, 1931 – December 12, 2007) was an American musician, bandleader, songwriter, record producer, and talent scout. An early pioneer of 1950s rock and roll, he is best known for his work in the 1960s and 1970s with his wife Tina Turner as the leader of the Ike & Tina Turner Revue.

A native of Clarksdale, Mississippi, Turner began playing piano in childhood and formed the Kings of Rhythm as a teenager. His first recording, "Rocket 88", credited to Jackie Brenston and his Delta Cats, is widely regarded as a contender for the first rock and roll song. During the 1950s, Turner taught himself to play guitar and worked as a talent scout and producer for Sun Records and Modern Records, playing a key role in the early careers of several blues musicians, including B.B. King, Howlin' Wolf, and Bobby Bland. In 1954, he relocated to East St. Louis, where the Kings of Rhythm became one of the leading acts in the Greater St. Louis area. In 1960, Turner formed the Ike & Tina Turner Revue, which went on to achieve major success as a soul and rock crossover act during the decade.

Turner's cocaine addiction, along with allegations of domestic violence described by Tina Turner in her 1986 autobiography I, Tina and the 1993 film adaptation What's Love Got to Do with It, adversely affected his career. Addicted to cocaine for at least 15 years, Turner was convicted of drug offenses and served 18 months in prison. After his release in 1991, he relapsed in 2004 and died of a drug overdose in 2007. In the final decade of his life, Turner experienced a career resurgence as a frontman, returning to his blues roots with the release of the award-winning albums Here and Now (2001) and Risin' with the Blues (2006).

Hailed as a "great innovator" of rock and roll by contemporaries such as Little Richard and Johnny Otis, Turner received critical acclaim as well. Rolling Stone editor David Fricke ranked Turner No. 61 on his list of 100 Greatest Guitarists and noted, "Turner was one of the first guitarists to successfully transplant the intensity of the blues into more commercial music." Turner won five Grammy Awards, including two competitive awards and three Grammy Hall of Fame Awards. He also received the Recording Academy's Heroes Award. Turner was inducted into the Rock and Roll Hall of Fame with Tina Turner in 1991. As a solo artist, he is inducted into the St. Louis Walk of Fame, the Clarksdale Walk of Fame, the Mississippi Musicians Hall of Fame, the Blues Hall of Fame, and the Rhythm & Blues Hall of Fame.

== Early life ==
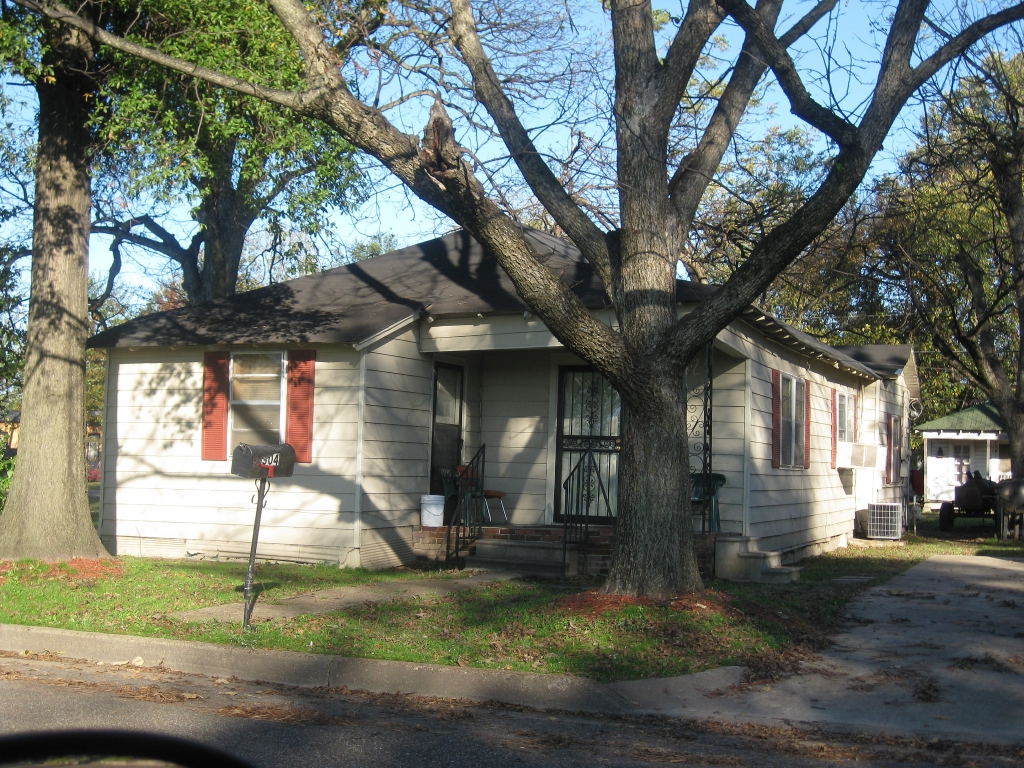
Ike Turner's birthplace and childhood home at 304 Washington Avenue in the Riverton neighborhood of Clarksdale, Mississippi.

Izear Luster Turner Jr. was born in Clarksdale, Mississippi, on November 5, 1931, to Beatrice Cushenberry, a seamstress, and Izear Luster Turner, a Baptist minister. His parents were Creole. Turner was the younger of their two children; his sister, Lee Ethel Knight, was "some ten years" his senior. When Turner applied for his first passport in the 1960s, he discovered that his name was registered as Ike Wister Turner. By then both of his parents were deceased, so he could not verify the origin of his name.

Blues historian Ted Drozdowski claimed that Turner's father died in an industrial accident; according to Turner, he witnessed his father beaten and left for dead by a white man (another account given by Turner alleged that "a couple of pickup-truck loads of whites in khaki pants and khaki shirts" dragged his father away, returning him after having "kicked holes in his stomach"). He claimed he was later told this assault was an act of retaliation over a woman with whom his father was having an affair, and that his father lived for two or three years as an invalid in a tent erected by the Health Department in the family's yard before succumbing to his injuries when Turner was about five years old. Donald Brackett, author of Tumult! The Incredible Life of Tina Turner, observed Turner "often related" this story, but that "like most Ike stories, it might need to be taken with a pound of salt".

His mother remarried an artist named Philip Reese, who Turner described as a violent alcoholic. One day after Reese gave him a whipping, Turner knocked him out with a length of lumber and ran away to Memphis for a few days before returning home. Despite their troubled relationship, Turner moved his stepfather into one of his homes in St. Louis after his mother died in 1959 and took care of him until his death in 1961.

Turner recounted how he was sexually assaulted at the age of six by a woman called Miss Boozie. Walking past her house to school, she would invite him to help feed her chickens and then take him to bed. This continued daily for some time. Turner was also sexually assaulted by another middle-aged woman, Miss Reedy, before he was twelve. Reflecting on these experiences, he stated: "That's probably why every relationship I was in was surrounded by sex. Sex was power to me."

External videos
- Oral History, Ike Turner shares moments of his life story and career. (Interview date December 1, 2005), NAMM (National Association of Music Merchants) Oral History Library

Turner attended Booker T. Washington Elementary School, then was promoted to Myrtle Hall in the sixth grade. He quit school in the eighth grade and began working as an elevator operator at the Alcazar Hotel in downtown Clarksdale. During breaks, he would watch DJ John Friskillo play records at the radio station, WROX, located in the hotel. WROX is noted for being the first radio station in Mississippi to employ a black DJ, Early Wright. One day, Friskillo spotted Turner watching and put him to work, teaching him the ins and outs of the control room. Soon, he was left to play records while Friskillo took coffee breaks. This led to Turner being offered a job by the station manager as the DJ on the late-afternoon shift. On his show, "Jive Till Five", he played a diverse range of music such as Roy Milton and Louis Jordan alongside early rockabilly records.

Turner was inspired to learn the piano after he heard blues pianist Pinetop Perkins play at his friend Ernest Lane's house. Turner persuaded his mother to pay for piano lessons, but he did not take to the formal style of playing. Instead, he spent the money in a pool hall and learned boogie-woogie from Perkins. At some point in the 1940s, Turner moved into Clarksdale's Riverside Hotel. The Riverside played host to touring musicians, including Sonny Boy Williamson II and Duke Ellington. Turner associated with many of these musicians, and at 13 years old he backed Sonny Boy Williamson II on piano.

== Career ==
=== 1946–1950: Formation of the Kings of Rhythm ===
As a teenager, Turner joined a local rhythm ensemble called the Tophatters, who played around Clarksdale, Mississippi. Members of the band were Clarksdale musicians and included Turner's school friends Raymond Hill, Eugene Fox and Clayton Love. The Tophatters played big band arrangements from sheet music. Turner, who was trained by ear and could not sight read, would learn the pieces by listening to a version on record at home, pretending to be reading the music during rehearsals. The Tophatters had over 30 members, but they broke up into two groups after six months to a year. One faction wanted to play jazz music and became the Dukes of Swing. The other band led by Turner became the Kings of Rhythm. Turner said, "we wanted to play blues, boogie-woogie and Roy Brown, Jimmy Liggins, Roy Milton". Turner kept the name throughout his career, although it went through lineup changes over time. Their early stage performances consisted largely of covers of popular jukebox hits. B.B. King helped them to get a steady weekend gig and recommended them to Sam Phillips at Memphis Recording Service. In the 1950s, Turner's group got regular airplay from live sessions on the radio stations WROX in Clarksdale and KFFA in Helena, Arkansas.

Around the time he was starting out with the Kings of Rhythm, Turner and Lane became unofficial roadies for blues musician Robert Nighthawk, who often played live on WROX. The pair played drums and piano on radio sessions. Turner gained experience performing by supporting Nighthawk at gigs around Clarksdale. He played juke joints alongside other local blues artists such as Elmore James, Muddy Waters, and Little Walter. Performances typically lasted about twelve hours, from early evening to dawn the next day. Turner recalled, "there wasn't no intermission. If the drummer had to pee, I would play drums until he returned....There were no breaks. We just switched around."

=== 1951: "Rocket 88" ===
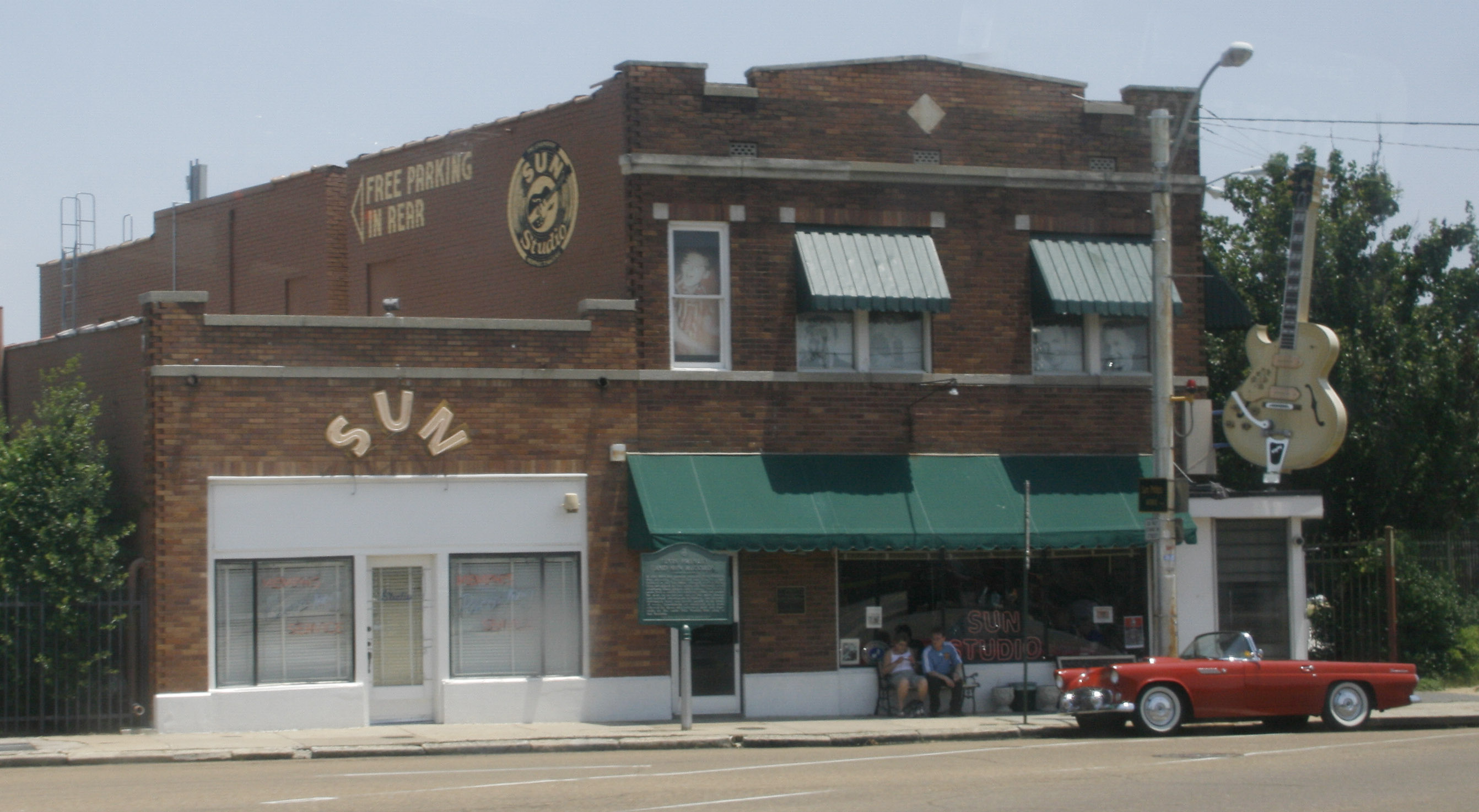
Sun Studio at 706 Union Avenue in Memphis, Tennessee, where in 1951 Turner and the Kings of Rhythm recorded "Rocket 88", one of the first rock and roll records. Turner would later work at the studio as in-house producer for Sam Phillips.

In March 1951, Turner and his band recorded the song "Rocket 88" at Memphis Recording Service (now Sun Studio). Turner's vocalist Johnny O'Neal had left to sign a solo contract with King Records, so Jackie Brenston, a saxophonist in the Kings of Rhythm, sang lead vocals while Turner was on piano. "Rocket 88" is notable among other things for Willie Kizart's distorted guitar sound.

Phillips licensed the recording to Chess Records in Chicago. Chess released it under the name "Jackie Brenston and His Delta Cats" instead of "Ike Turner and His Kings of Rhythm Featuring Jackie Brenston". Turner blamed Phillips for this misrepresentation. Soon after its release, the single caused a sensation and Turner performed with his band at the W.C. Handy Theatre in Memphis.

The single reached number-one on the Billboard R&B charts in June 1951 and spent 5 weeks on top of the charts. The record sold approximately half a million copies. Turner and the band were paid $20 each for the record. The exception was Brenston, who sold the rights to Phillips for $910. Phillips used profits from the success of the record to launch Sun Records in February 1952.

The song is often cited as the first rock n' roll record, but in a later interview, Turner offered this assessment: "I don't think that 'Rocket 88' is rock 'n' roll. I think that 'Rocket 88' is R&B, but I think 'Rocket 88' is the cause of rock and roll existing".

The success of "Rocket 88" generated tension and ego clashes in the band which culminated with Brenston leaving to pursue a solo career, causing the band to fall apart. Turner, without a band and disappointed his hit record had not created more opportunities for him, disbanded the Kings of Rhythm for a few years.

=== 1951–1954: Session musician and talent scout ===
Soon after the release of "Rocket 88", Turner moved to West Memphis, Arkansas and played with various local bands. He then became a freelance talent scout, session musician, and production assistant for Sam Phillips at Sun Studio, commuting to Memphis, Tennessee. Wishing to exploit his Delta music connections, the Bihari brothers at Modern Records also hired Turner as a talent scout, paying him to find southern musicians who might be worth recording. Turner arranged for B.B. King and the Beale Streeters to record for Modern at the YMCA in Memphis. Turner played piano on King's early records "You Know I Love You" and "3 O'Clock Blues", which became King's first two number-ones. According to Joe Bihari, Turner had brought King to his attention years prior. He said, "Ike wasn't more than sixteen then. He would send dubs of things he cut to us, and if we'd like them we'd make a seal or sign the artist. That's how we acquired B.B. King." King also maintained that Turner introduced him to the Bihari brothers.

Unaware of songwriter's royalties, Turner also wrote new material which the Biharis copyrighted under their own names. They often purchased or claimed co-writer credit of songs written by artists on their labels using pseudonyms. Turner estimated he wrote seventy-eight hit records for the Biharis. Artists Turner discovered for Modern and Sun include Bobby Bland, Howlin' Wolf, Rosco Gordon, Boyd Gilmore, Houston Boines, Charley Booker, and Little Milton. He played piano in sessions with them and lesser-known artists such as the Prisonaires, Driftin' Slim, Ben Burton, Matt Cockrell, Dennis Binder, Sunny Blair, and Baby Face Turner.

Turner was contracted to the Bihari brothers, but he continued to work for Phillips, where he was effectively the in-house producer. This sometimes created conflicts of interest. In 1951, Turner recorded two Howlin' Wolf tracks for Phillips, playing piano on "How Many More Years" and "Moanin' at Midnight", which Phillips sent to Chess. Turner and Howlin' Wolf then recorded a version of "Moanin' at Midnight" at radio station KWEM in West Memphis without Phillips' or the Chess brothers' knowledge. He sent the results to the Biharis at Modern and they released it on their subsidiary label RPM Records. Turner also attempted to poach Elmore James from Trumpet Records and record him for Modern. Trumpet found out and Modern had to cancel the record. However, James did eventually sign with Modern, and Turner played on his recordings that were released on Modern's subsidiary label Flair Records.

While in Helena, Turner tried to recruit Little Walter to record for Modern in January 1952, but Little Walter was on his way to Mississippi. In 1952, Turner discovered Little Junior Parker in West Memphis, and they formed a band with Matt "Guitar" Murphy. Turner recorded Parker's first single, "You're My Angel" / "Bad Women, Bad Whiskey", credited to Little Junior Parker and the Blue Flames. That summer Turner recorded with the new vocalist and pianist in his band, Marion Louis Lee, resulting in "My Heart Belongs to You" / "Looking for My Baby". The records were released on RPM as Bonnie and Ike Turner and they performed together at the Hippodrome in Memphis. Turner married Lee in September 1952.

Unbeknownst to Turner, during his time in West Memphis, he met Elvis Presley, who was a truck driver. He recalled, "[Presley] was just a white boy that would come over to black clubs. He would come in and stand behind the piano and watch me play. I never knew he was no musician." Turner discovered his identity many years later after Presley approached him when they were both playing at the International Hotel.

To accommodate his then-wife Bonnie, who also played piano, Turner taught himself how to play guitar by ear, and Willie Kizart taught him blues guitar techniques. He began playing guitar in sessions in 1953, and by 1954, with the assistance of Joe Bihari, he built a makeshift recording studio at a defunct Greyhound bus station in Clarksdale. Turner used his Kings of Rhythm as session musicians. They played on many recordings for Bihari's Modern, RPM, and Flair labels. Some of the artists Turner backed on piano and guitar during this period include Elmore James, Johnny Ace and the Flairs. Around this time Turner discovered Billy "The Kid" Emerson in Greenville. He brought Emerson to record at Sun Records and backed him on guitar in 1954.

=== 1954–1959: St. Louis ===
In 1954, Turner visited his sister Lee Ethel Knight in St. Louis, Missouri. During his stay, he went clubbing at Ned Love's in East St. Louis, Illinois. Love invited Turner and his band to play at his club. Eventually, Turner returned with his reformed version of the Kings of Rhythm. The band consisted of Willie Kizart on guitar, Willie "Bad Boy" Sims on drums, vocalist Johnny O'Neal, Turner's nephew Jesse Knight Jr. on bass, and Turner's wife Annie Mae Wilson on piano and vocals.

Turner maintained strict discipline and the band lived at his home on Virginia Place in East St. Louis which doubled as a studio. A teetotaler at the time, he avoided drugs and insisted all band members also adopt this policy, firing anyone he even suspected of breaking the rules. Turner established his group as one of the most highly rated on the St. Louis club circuit, vying for popularity with their main competition, Sir John's Trio featuring Chuck Berry. The bands would play all-nighters in St. Louis, then cross the river to the clubs of East St. Louis, and continue playing until dawn. Initially, they played for predominately black audiences at clubs in Illinois such as the Club Manhattan in East St. Louis, which Turner and his band built, the Club Riviera in St. Louis, the Harlem Club in Brookline and the Kingsbury in Madison. In St. Louis, Turner was exposed to a white audience who were excited by R&B. He played at the Moonlight Bar, Latin Quarter, and the Club Imperial, which was popular with white teenagers. He also gained a big following at Club DeLisa and locally he was acknowledged as the "King of Rock and Roll". As his popularity grew among both whites and blacks, he demanded that the clubs should be integrated. He performed regularly on Dave Dixon's radio show, which aired live from the Birdcage Lounge, on KSTL. He also had live music broadcasts on the St. Louis radio station KATZ.

In between live dates, Turner took the band to Cincinnati to record for Federal Records in 1956. The single, "I'm Tore Up" / "If I Never Had Known You" featuring Billy Gayles, was released in April 1956. It became a regional hit and Turner's booking fee doubled after its release. Like Brenston years prior, Gayles left Turner's band to pursue a solo career. In 1958, Turner took the band to Chicago to record for Cobra/Artistic, as well as fulfilling his contract as a session musician back at Sun. While in Chicago, Turner backed Otis Rush, playing the signature vibrato guitar parts on "Double Trouble". He also helped Buddy Guy record his second record, resulting in the single "You Sure Can't Do" / "This Is The End", on which Turner played guitar and composed the latter.

Turner befriended St. Louis R&B fan Bill Stevens, who set up the short-lived Stevens Records in 1959. Turner released two singles on the Stevens label, "Jack Rabbit" / "In Your Eyes Baby" and "Ho–Ho" / "Hey–Hey". He used the anagram "Icky Renrut" because he was still under contract with Sun for several more months, and he didn't want to cause friction with Phillips. In addition, Turner recorded numerous sessions for Stevens with various vocalists and musician lineups of the Kings of Rhythm.

=== 1960–1976: The Ike and Tina Turner Revue ===
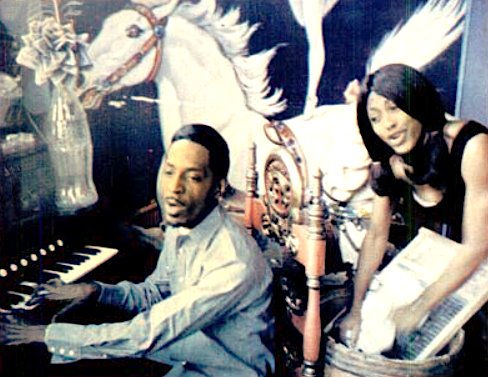
Ike & Tina Turner by Dennis Hopper for the album River Deep – Mountain High (1966)

In 1956, Ann Bullock accompanied her sister Alline Bullock to watch Turner and the Kings of Rhythm at the Club Manhattan in East St. Louis. Alline was a barmaid at the club and was dating Turner's drummer Eugene Washington. Through her sister and Washington, Ann Bullock asked Turner to sing with his band. Turner said he'd call her onstage, but he never did. One night during an intermission, she got hold of the microphone from Washington and sang "You Know I Love You" by B.B. King. Impressed by her voice, Turner invited her to sing with the band. She made her recording debut on Turner's song "Boxtop", released on Tune Town Records in 1958.

In March 1960, Turner allowed her to record a demo of his self-penned song "A Fool in Love". He intended to use the demo as guide track for Art Lassiter, who did not attend the scheduled recording session at Technisonic Studios. A local DJ suggested he send the record to Sue Records in New York, where label owner Juggy Murray insisted on releasing the track with Bullock's vocal. Murray offered a $20,000 advance for the song and suggested Turner "make her the star" of his show. Turner then renamed her "Tina" because it rhymed with Sheena; however, family and friends still called her Ann. He was inspired by Sheena, Queen of the Jungle and Nyoka the Jungle Girl to create her stage persona. He had the name "Tina Turner" trademarked, so that in case she left, another singer could perform under the same name.

The single "A Fool In Love" was released in July 1960, and it became a national hit, selling a million copies. It peaked at No. 2 on the Billboard R&B chart and No. 27 on the Hot 100. Turner added a backing girl group he renamed the Ikettes, and along with the Kings of Rhythm they began performing as the Ike & Tina Turner Revue. The success of the single was followed by a string of hits including "I Idolize You", "Poor Fool", and "It's Gonna Work Out Fine" which gave them their second million-seller and their first Grammy nomination.

In 1961, Turner played piano on Albert King's first hit record, "Don't Throw Your Love on Me So Strong". The single, released on King Records, peaked at No. 14 on the Billboard R&B chart. He also wrote and produced the Ikettes hit "I'm Blue (The Gong-Gong Song)".

The Revue performed rigorously on the Chitlin' Circuit and built a reputation as "one of the hottest, most durable, and potentially most explosive of all R&B ensembles". To assure he always had a record out while on tour, Turner formed multiple labels such as Sputnik, Teena, Prann, Innis, Sony and Sonja. He produced singles by the Ikettes, Jimmy Thomas, Fontella Bass, George Jackson, and other artists on his labels. The duo switched to Turner's Sonja label in 1963. For the next six years, they recorded on Warner Bros./Loma, Modern/Kent, Cenco, Philles, Tangerine, Pompeii, Blue Thumb, Minit, and A&M. Between 1964 and 1965, they scored fourteen top 40 R&B hits with "You Can't Miss Nothing That You Never Had", "Tell Her I'm Not Home", "Good Bye, So Long", and "Two Is a Couple". Around this time, Jimi Hendrix briefly played backing guitar in the band.

In 1965, Phil Spector saw them perform at a club on the Sunset Strip and invited them to film The Big T.N.T. Show. Impressed by their performance, Spector negotiated a deal with their manager Bob Krasnow, head of Loma Records, offering $20,000 to produce Tina and have them released from their Loma contract. After Tina and Spector recorded "River Deep – Mountain High", the duo signed to Spector's Philles label in 1966. The failure of the single in America triggered Spector's retreat from the music industry. However, it was a hit in Europe, reaching No. 3 on the UK Singles Chart and No. 1 on Los 40 Principales in Spain. Following the song's success in the UK, they were invited to open for the Rolling Stones on their 1966 British Tour. This exposure introduced them to a wider audience outside of R&B. Soon they were booking bigger venues, and by 1969 they were headlining in Las Vegas.

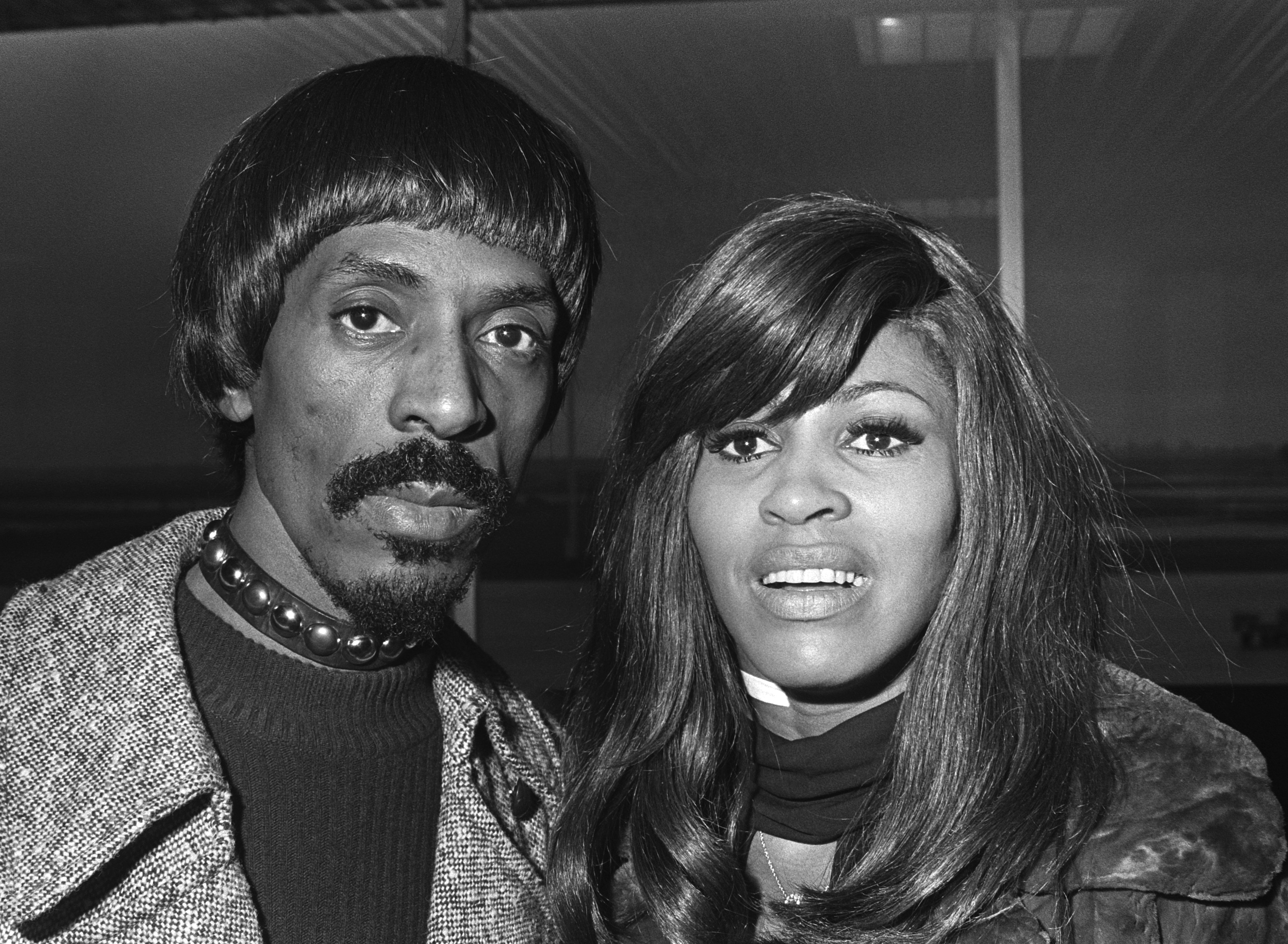
Ike & Tina Turner arriving at Amsterdam Airport Schiphol in 1971

In April 1969, Turner and the Kings of Rhythm released an album, A Black Man's Soul, on Pompeii Records. The album earned Turner his first solo Grammy nomination for Best R&B Instrumental Performance at the 12th Annual Grammy Awards. Later that year, the duo released the blues-oriented albums Outta Season and The Hunter on Blue Thumb Records. Turner and Bob Krasnow, founder of Blue Thumb, co-produced Earl Hooker's 1969 album Sweet Black Angel. In November, the Ike & Tina Turner Revue opened for the Rolling Stones on their 1969 American Tour.

In January 1970, they performed on The Ed Sullivan Show and released their rendition of "Come Together", which reached No. 21 on the R&B chart. Their cover of "I Want to Take You Higher" by Sly and the Family Stone was also successful on the charts in 1970. Turner, who was a friend of Sly Stone, played guitar on Sly and the Family Stone's album There's a Riot Goin' On (1971). The release of "Proud Mary" in 1971 became Ike & Tina Turner's biggest hit, reaching No. 4 on the Billboard Hot 100 and No. 5 on the R&B chart. It sold more than a million copies, and won the duo a Grammy Award for Best R&B Vocal Performance by a Group at the 14th Annual Grammy Awards.

Their mainstream success provided Turner with the finances to open his own recording studio, Bolic Sound in Inglewood, in 1972. Turner had two sixteen track studios built, a large one to rent out and a smaller one for his personal recordings. He fitted them out with state-of-the-art equipment. Artists who recorded there included Paul McCartney, George Harrison, Duane Allman, Little Richard, Gayle McCormick, and Frank Zappa.

Turner released two solo albums for United Artists Records, Blues Roots (1972) and Bad Dreams (1973). In 1973, the duo released "Nutbush City Limits" penned by Tina. The single peaked at No. 22 on the Billboard Hot 100, No. 11 on the R&B chart and it was a bigger hit in Europe. The Turners received the Golden European Record Award, the first ever given, for selling more than one million records of "Nutbush City Limits" in Europe.

During this period, Turner produced singer Judy Cheeks' debut album Judy Cheeks (1973), and the last album by the Ikettes, (G)Old & New (1974). In 1974, Ike and Tina released the album The Gospel According to Ike & Tina Turner. The album was nominated for Best Soul Gospel Performance. Turner also earned a solo nomination for his single "Father Alone". Between 1974 and 1975, the duo released the singles "Sweet Rhode Island Red", "Sexy Ida", and "Baby, Get It On".

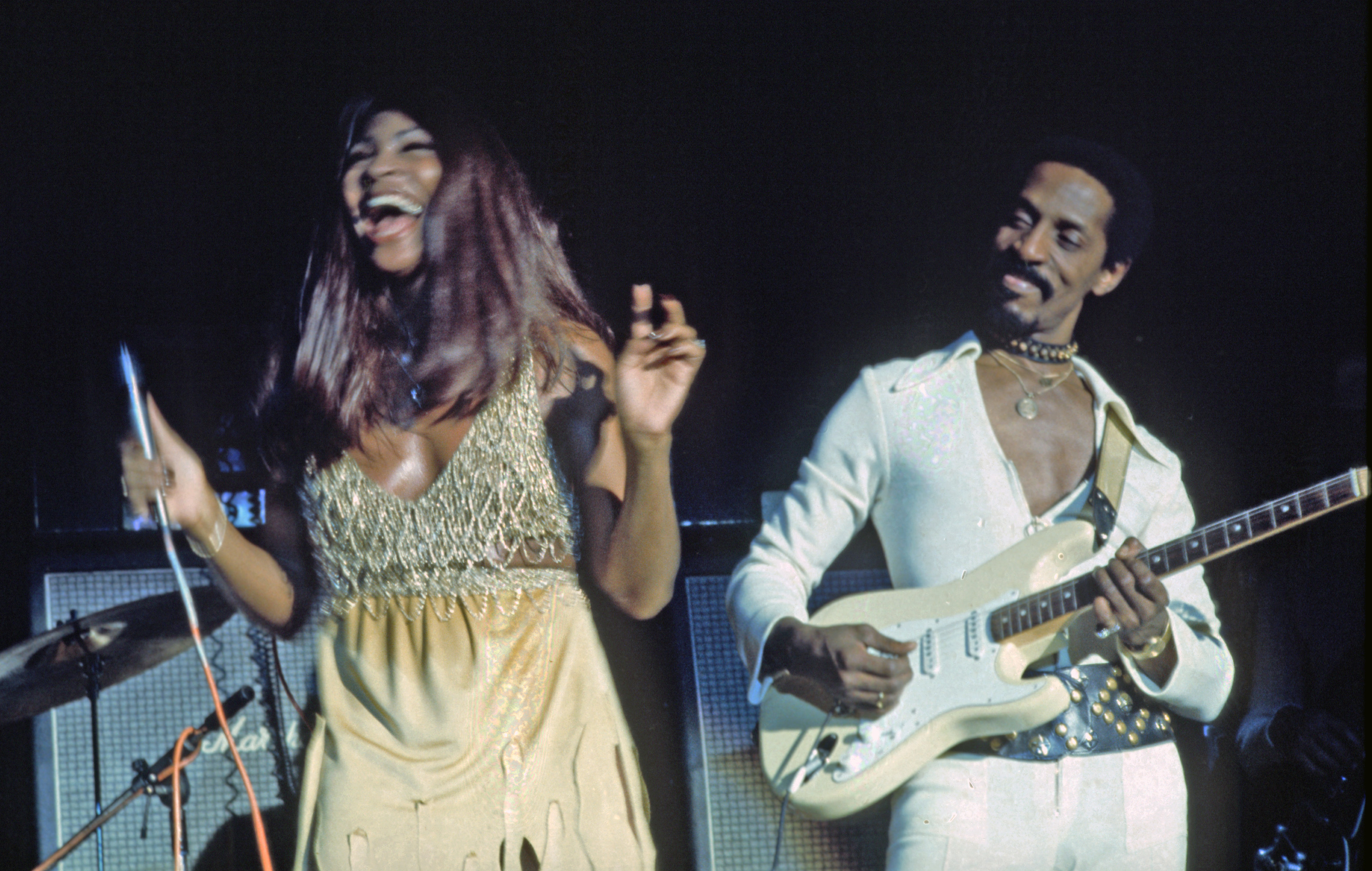
Ike & Tina Turner performing at Musikhalle Hamburg in Hamburg, 1972

The Ike & Tina Turner Revue ended abruptly in 1976. That year, they headlined at the Waldorf Astoria New York and signed a television deal with CBS-TV. Turner had plans to leave United Artists Records for a five-year $150,000 per year deal with Cream Records, which was to be signed on July 6. On July 1, the Turners got into a violent altercation en route to their gig at the Dallas Statler Hilton. Turner later claimed that Tina initiated the conflict by purposely irritating him so that she would have a reason to break up with him before they signed the new contract. Tina fled from the hotel shortly after they arrived, and filed for divorce on July 27, 1976. She would later describe a relationship in which Turner was frequently violent and abusive, sometimes beating her with wooden objects like a shoe-stretcher or hanger. The night she left, his beating left her face bruised, swollen, and bleeding.

United Artists responded to the Turners' separation by releasing albums of compiled recordings from their last sessions together, Delilah's Power (1977) and Airwaves (1978). Two years after their divorce was finalized, Turner released the single "Party Vibes" / "Shame, Shame, Shame" from the album The Edge (1980) which peaked at No. 27 on the Billboard Disco Top 100 chart.

=== 1977–2007: Later career ===
After Turner's breakup with Tina, singer Holly Maxwell sang with him on occasion from 1977 to 1985 and again for eight months in 1992. Maxwell reported a positive working relationship with Turner and later released the memoir Freebase Ain't Free about their close friendship. In 1979, Turner spent time in the studio with Chaka Khan following her separation from her manager-husband. She told Jet: "He's been real inspiration and a catalyst emotionally and in other ways as well. We plan to record together." Turner struggled to find success due to his cocaine addiction and run-ins with the law. In 1988, Turner attempted an ill-fated return to the stage with Marcy Thomas, Bonnie Johnson, and Jeanette Bazzell as his Ikettes.

While Turner was in prison following a drug conviction, Ike & Tina Turner were inducted to the Rock & Roll Hall of Fame in 1991. Tina did not attend because she took the year off from making public appearances, so Phil Spector delivered a speech at the ceremony on their behalf. After his release from prison, Turner told the press that he was nervous about returning to performing live, but had plans to return to the studio. He sold 20 unreleased Ike & Tina Turner masters to the independent label Esquire Records. In 1992, Turner performed as a special guest at Oliver Sain's Soul Reunion concert at Mississippi Nights in St. Louis.

Hip-hop group Salt-N-Pepa sampled the Sweet Inspirations rendition of Turner's composition "I'm Blue (The Gong Gong Song)" for their 1993 single "Shoop". The song reached No. 4 in the Billboard Hot 100 and Turner earned around half a million dollars in royalties. He re-recorded "I'm Blue" as a duet with singer Billy Rogers in 1995. Produced by Rogers, the remake received favorable reviews. Turner later appeared on the song "Love Gravy" with Rick James for the soundtrack album Chef Aid: The South Park Album.

Turner reformed the Ikettes in the mid-1990s, which included his then-wife Jeanette Bazzell Turner, Nina Hill, and Michelle Love (Randi Love). Vera Clyburn, who was an Ikette in the 1970s, was the lead singer. They performed to positive reviews as the Ike Turner Revue. In August 1997, Turner returned to his hometown Clarksdale to headline the 10th Annual Sunflower River Blues & Gospel Festival. Turner credited Joe Louis Walker with encouraging him to return to his roots in blues music. Turner played guitar and assisted in the production on Walker's 1997 album Great Guitars; Walker paid him $5,000 a night for six songs. Walker invited Turner to perform with him at the San Francisco Blues Festival and to tour in Europe. The positive response to the tour encouraged Turner to reform the Kings of Rhythm. They toured the US in 2001, and headlined a showcase at South by Southwest, where they were hailed as one of the highlights of the conference. Turner's work on the tour led to the recording and release of his Grammy-nominated album Here & Now (2001). In 2002, Turner's performance at the Montreux Jazz Festival was released as a live album and DVD.

In 2002, Turner filmed Martin Scorsese's PBS documentary series The Blues, which aired in September 2003. He is featured in the documentaries The Road to Memphis and Godfathers and Sons, as part of the series. Turner appeared on the Gorillaz's album Demon Days (2005), playing piano on "Every Planet We Reach Is Dead". He performed the song with Gorillaz at the Manchester Opera House in November 2005. His performance is featured in the live concert DVD Demon Days: Live at the Manchester Opera House.

In 2006, Turner released his last album, Risin' With the Blues, on the independent label Zoho Roots. The album received positive critical reception, and was nominated for best Blues Album at the 7th Annual Independent Music Awards. Turner won his first solo Grammy Award for Best Traditional Blues Album at the 49th Annual Grammy Awards in 2007.

Turner began working on a collaboration album with Gorillaz's producer Danger Mouse and the Black Keys in early 2007. The Black Keys sent demos to Turner, but the project was temporarily shelved. After Turner's death, the songs were used for their 2008 album Attack & Release. Although Turner does not appear on the album, Pitchfork noted his influence in the production.

== Artistry and legacy ==
=== Musical style ===
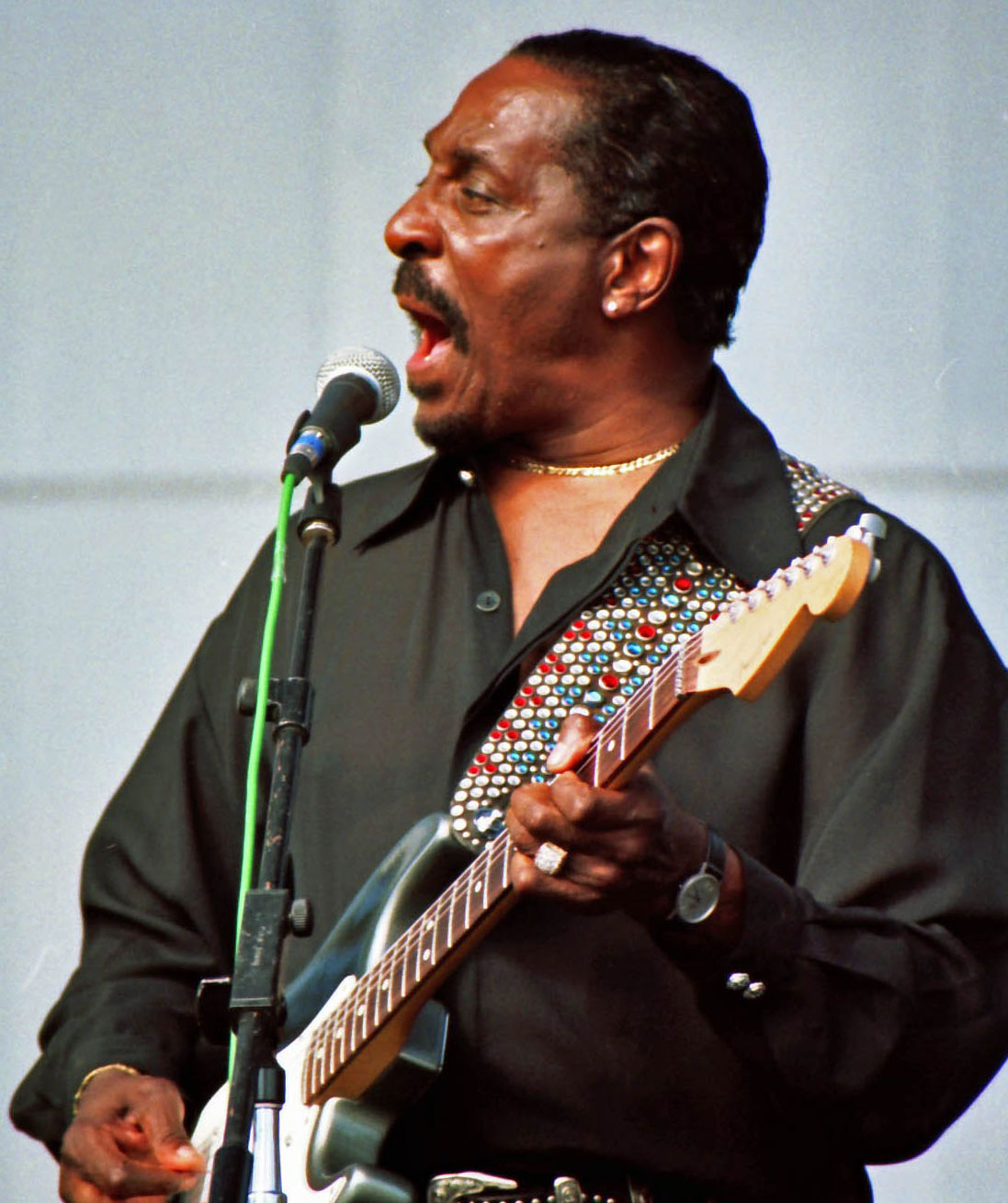
Ike Turner performing at the Long Beach Blues Festival in 1997

In his career, Turner originally worked in the style of 1950s R&B, or post-jump blues. His early influences included Amos Milburn and Louis Jordan, as well as country music artists such as Hank Williams Sr. and Merle Travis. Though primarily known as a guitarist, Turner began his career playing piano and personally considered it his main instrument. In 1951, journalist Mike McGee compared him to jazz pianist Fats Waller and wrote: "Ike Turner is the hottest piano player in many a day."

Turner grew up playing boogie woogie piano, which he learned from blues pianist Pinetop Perkins. He decided he was not meant to be a frontman when at twelve he was coerced into giving an impromptu piano recital in school. He found the experience terrifying and from then on preferred not to be the focus of attention, but rather to be in the background controlling the show. He considered himself an organizer rather than a performer. Musician Donald Fagen noted: "[T]alented as he was, there wasn't anything really supernatural about Ike's skills as a musician... What Ike excelled at was leadership: conceptualization, organization, and execution."

Turner's guitar style is distinguished by heavy use of the whammy bar to achieve a strong reverb-soaked vibrato, string bending, hammer-ons and triplets in his blues phrasing. Turner was an early adopter of the Fender Stratocaster electric guitar, buying one from O.K. Houk's Piano Co. store in Memphis the year of its release in 1954. Unaware that the guitar's tremolo arm could be used to subtle effect, Turner used it to play screaming, swooping and diving solos that predated artists such as Jimi Hendrix and Jeff Beck by a decade. In The Stratocaster Chronicles, Tom Wheeler wrote that Turner's "inventive style is a classic example of an artist discovering the Stratocaster, adapting to its features and fashioning something remarkable". Turner himself said of his tremolo technique: "I thought it was to make the guitar scream—people got so excited when I used that thing." Dave Rubin wrote in Premier Guitar magazine: "All those years of playing piano and arranging taught him a considerable amount about harmony, as he could certainly navigate I-IV-V chord changes. Ike modestly terms what he does on the guitar as 'tricks', but make no mistake, he attacked his axe with the conviction of a man who knew precisely what he wanted to hear come out of it."

Reviewing Turner's 1973 album Bad Dreams, Robert Christgau wrote: "After twenty years of raking it in from the shadows, he's finally figured out a way of applying his basically comic bass/baritone to rock and roll. Studio-psychedelic New Orleans, echoes of the Band and Dr. John, some brilliant minor r&b mixed in with the dumb stuff. My God—at the moment he's more interesting than Tina."

=== Influence ===
"It ain't Little Richard, it ain't Chuck, it ain't Fats Domino — no, we came on later. This man was playing the blues, rhythm and blues. Rock 'n' roll came from rhythm and blues: rock 'n' roll ain't nothing but rhythm and blues up-tempo. Ike Turner was the innovator, for rhythm and blues and for rock 'n' roll. We just came and took it home."

— Little Richard (1999)

Turner was praised by his contemporaries for his influence. Johnny Otis said, "Ike Turner is a very important man in American music. The texture and flavor of R&B owe a lot to him. He defined how to put the Fender bass into that music. He was a great innovator." B.B. King was a great admirer of Turner, describing him as "The best bandleader I've ever seen". King also said, "When they talk about rock 'n roll, I see Ike as one of the founding fathers." Turner was a big influence on Little Richard, who wrote the introduction to Turner's autobiography. Little Richard was inspired to play the piano after he heard Turner's piano intro on "Rocket 88", and later used it note for note on "Good Golly, Miss Molly". Prince also said Turner was his first musical influence.

Phil Alexander, editor-in-chief of Mojo magazine, referred to Turner as the "cornerstone of modern day rock 'n' roll" and credited his arrangements of blues standards as being an influence on 1960s British Invasion groups: "He proceeded to influence British rockers from the mid-1960s onwards. Without Ike you wouldn't have had the Stones and Zeppelin. People like that wouldn't have had the source material on which they drew."

Speaking on "Rocket 88" being a contender for the first rock 'n' roll record, broadcaster Paul Gambaccini said:

In musical terms [he was] very important. "Rocket 88" is one of the two records that can claim to be the first rock 'n' roll record, the other being "The Fat Man" by Fats Domino from 1949. But "Rocket 88" does have a couple of elements which "The Fat Man" did not. The wailing saxophone and that distorted electric guitar. It was number one in the rhythm and blues chart for five weeks, it is in the Grammy Hall of Fame and it was an indisputable claim to fame for Ike Turner....To critics he will be known as a great founder, unfortunately to the general public he will always be known as a brutal man.

Nigel Cawthorne—co-author of Turner's autobiography—said:

Although there had been black rock 'n' rollers who had made it big already, they really only played to a white audience. Ike and Tina played to a mixed audience and he deliberately desegregated audiences in the southern states and he wouldn't play to any segregated audiences at all. Because he had such a big band and entourage he desegregated a lot of the hotels because the hotel chains wouldn't want to miss out on the money they would make from him touring the southern states.

Turner's songs have been sampled by hip-hop artists; most notably, Salt-N-Pepa used "I'm Blue" for their 1994 hit "Shoop". Jurassic 5 used "Getting Nasty" from A Black Man's Soul on the track "Concrete Schoolyard" in 1997. Main Source also sampled "Getting Nasty" on the track "Snake Eyes" as well as Ike & Tina Turner's "Bold Soul Sister" on "Just Hanging Out"; both featured on their 1991 album Breaking Atoms. The track "Funky Mule", also from A Black Man's Soul, has been sampled extensively by jungle DJs, with the drum introduction being a very popular break. It was sampled by producer Goldie for his 1994 hit "Inner City Life", in the same year by Krome & Time on "The License", and by Paradox in 2002 on track "Funky Mule".

In 2009, a Nashville-based band, Mr. Groove Band, recorded a tribute album titled Rocket 88: Tribute to Ike Turner. Vocalists on the album include Turner's last wife Audrey Madison Turner and former Ikette Bonnie Bramlett.

=== Accolades ===
Turner won two competitive Grammy Awards. Ike & Tina Turner won Best R&B Vocal Performance by a Group for "Proud Mary" in 1972. In 2007, Turner won Best Traditional Blues Album for Risin' with the Blues. Turner also has three songs inducted into the Grammy Hall of Fame: "Rocket 88", "River Deep – Mountain High", and "Proud Mary".

Ike & Tina Turner were inducted into the Rock & Roll Hall of Fame in 1991. Turner is inducted into the Blues Hall of Fame and the Rhythm and Blues Music Hall of Fame. He is also inducted into the Mississippi Musicians Hall of Fame. He was honored with a star on the St. Louis Walk of Fame in 2001.

Turner won Comeback Album of The Year for Here and Now at the W.C. Handy Blues Awards in 2002. In 2004, he was awarded the Heroes Award from the Memphis branch of the Recording Academy. He was a recipient of the Legend Award at the 2007 Mojo Awards.

In 2003, the album Proud Mary: The Best of Ike & Tina Turner was ranked No. 212 on Rolling Stone magazine's list of the 500 greatest albums of all time (No. 214 on 2012 revised list).

In 2004, Fender Custom Shop manufactured a limited edition Ike Turner Tribute Stratocaster. The model has an alder body in Sonic Blue with an Ike Turner signature in gold ink on the body under the clear-coat, with a maple neck in a 1960s "C" shape with a rosewood fingerboard, with 21 vintage frets. It had three custom single coil 1960s Strat pickups. Only 100 specimens were made, retailing at $3,399.99.

In August 2010, Turner was posthumously celebrated in his hometown of Clarksdale, Mississippi. On August 6, Clarksdale officials and music fans gathered to unveil a marker on the Mississippi Blues Trail and a plaque on the Clarksdale Walk of Fame in downtown Clarksdale honoring Turner and his musical legacy. The unveilings coincided with Clarksdale's 23rd Annual Sunflower River Blues & Gospel Festival, which paid tribute to Turner.

Although Turner considered himself a pianist rather than a guitarist, Rolling Stone magazine editor David Fricke ranked him No. 61 on his list of 100 Greatest Guitarists in 2010.

In 2015, Rolling Stone ranked Ike & Tina Turner No. 2 on their list of the 20 Greatest Duos of All Time.

In 2017, the Mississippi Blues Trail honored "Rocket 88" for being an influential record with a marker in Lyon, Mississippi. In 2018, "Rocket 88" was chosen for the inaugural class of influential songs inducted into the Rock and Roll Hall of Fame Singles.

=== Portrayal in popular culture ===
In 1986, Tina Turner released her autobiography, I, Tina, in which she recounted Turner's volatile behavior. He received negative publicity that was exacerbated in 1993 by the release of the film adaptation What's Love Got to Do with It. Turner received $45,000 for the film, but he had unknowingly signed papers waiving the right to sue Disney's Touchstone Pictures for his depiction. He was portrayed by Laurence Fishburne, whose performance earned him a nomination for Best Actor at the 66th Academy Awards.

After the release of the film, the fictionalized version of Turner from the movie was seized on by comedians, who reused the persona in sketches. On the 1990s sketch comedy show In Living Color, Turner was parodied by David Alan Grier. He was portrayed on Saturday Night Live's Weekend Update by Tim Meadows in a pageboy wig. On the John Boy and Billy radio show, cast member Jeff Pillars regularly performed an impersonation of Turner in a segment called "Ax/Ask Ike". These sketches were collected in a 2008 comedy album Ike at the Mike. In 2006, Vibe magazine ranked the character of Ike Turner from What's Love Got to Do with It at No. 4 in their list of the 20 best movie "bad guys".

Commenting on the historical accuracy of the film, Tina told Larry King in 1997: "I would have liked them to have more truth, but according to Disney [owner of the film's production company], they said it's impossible, the people would not have believed the truth." In 2018, Tina told Oprah Winfrey that she only recently watched the film, but she could not finish it because she "didn't realize they would change the details so much." Phil Spector criticized Tina's book and called the film a "piece of trash" during his eulogy at Turner's funeral.

In 2015, TV One's Unsung offered some redemption with "The Story of Ike Turner", which documented his career along with his trials and tribulations. In the musical Tina: The Tina Turner Musical, Turner was portrayed by British actor Kobna Holdbrook-Smith, who won the Laurence Olivier Award for Best Actor in a Musical for his role in 2019.

=== Books ===
In 1999, Turner published his autobiography Takin' Back My Name: The Confessions of Ike Turner. It was written with Nigel Cawthorne and Little Richard wrote the introduction. In 2003, John Collis published Ike Turner: King of Rhythm about the life and musical contributions of Turner.

== Personal life ==
=== Marriages ===
Turner claimed to have been married fourteen times, but the legality of many of his marriages is ambiguous. Some of his marriages were never legally finalized, while others were bigamous. Speaking on his early marriages, he said: "You gave a preacher two dollars, the (marriage) papers cost three dollars, that was it. In those days, African Americans did not bother with divorces."

==== Early marriages ====
Turner was first married at 16 years old to Edna Dean Stewart of Ruleville, Mississippi. They were married on April 10, 1948. Records show that Turner added four years to his age. Edna didn't want to stay in Clarksdale, so she left Turner and returned to Ruleville.

Turner's second wife, Velma Davis (née Dishman), is the elder sister of former Ikette Joshie Armstead. Turner met her at the Cotton Club on Camplin Avenue in Yazoo City, Mississippi in 1948. Davis claimed that Turner was the father of her daughter Linda Turner Bullock, born in 1949. However, Turner asserted in his book that he was not the biological father. The couple married on September 19, 1950. Davis and Bullock attended Turner's Mississippi Blues Trail marker unveiling in 2010.

Turner then married Rosa Lee Sane in West Memphis, Arkansas. According to Turner, she had a mental breakdown, so her family put her in an insane asylum in Tennessee. Turner said he tried to get her out, but he never saw her again.

Turner married Marion Louis Lee (Bonnie Turner) in Clarksdale on September 24, 1952. Lee was a member of the Kings of Rhythm as a pianist and vocalist. In 1952, under the alias Mary Sue, she released the single "Everybody's Talking" / "Love Is a Gamble" on Modern Records. She co-wrote both tunes with Turner. The couple also recorded for RPM Records and Sun Records. Turner recalled, "Bonnie played piano. It was a job staying ahead of this chick, man, cos' she was always trying to outdo me." While they were in Sarasota, Florida for a gig, she ran off to New York with another man in 1953. Their divorce was finalized in 1955.

After Lee, Turner married a woman named Alice in Helena, Arkansas. According to Turner, they did not consummate their marriage. Alice was dating his vocalist Johnny O'Neal, but Turner liked her, so he married her to avoid "locking heads" with O'Neal. "If I married her, he couldn't do nothing", he said.

After Alice, Turner married Annie Mae Wilson from Greenville, Mississippi. She played piano and was the secretary for his band. Wilson left Turner for a policeman in East St. Louis, Illinois. In 1958, Turner presented a petition to the East St. Louis Board of Police Commissioners, stating that police officer Curtis Smith had harassed him and hit him in the head, causing his eardrum to burst, out of spite because of his relationship with Wilson.

In East St. Louis, Turner lived with Lorraine Taylor. Her parents owned the Taylor Sausage Factory in St. Louis. Sources often incorrectly refer to Taylor as one of Turner's wives, but she was his live-in girlfriend. Lorraine already had two children of her own before she had two sons, Ike Jr. and Michael, with Turner.

==== Tina Turner ====
"I still love Tina as much as I ever loved her...I wrote her a letter five years ago. I never sent it...I was telling her in this letter that I'm sorry for putting her and the kids through that kind of stuff. I was stupid. I was inconsiderate about her feelings. I understand today. She came from an abusive relationship and went straight to the top."

— Ike Turner (2007)

In 1956, Turner met Ann Bullock (whom he later renamed Tina Turner) at the Club Manhattan in East St. Louis. They became close friends and she began dating his saxophonist Raymond Hill. When Bullock became pregnant by Hill, they lived with Turner and his live-in girlfriend Lorraine Taylor. Hill injured his ankle and left Bullock before their son Craig was born in August 1958. During Bullock's pregnancy, Taylor became suspicious that Bullock was pregnant by Turner and threatened her with a gun before shooting herself; her injuries were nonfatal. However, Turner and Bullock eventually began having an affair and she became pregnant in January 1960.

Following the birth of their son Ronnie in October 1960, Ike and Tina Turner were married in Tijuana in 1962. Turner stated that the reason they went to Tijuana was to see "sex shows and whores". Turner has stated that at the time of their wedding, he was still legally married to Alice Bell. He has also said that he used a detective agency to locate Bell in Chicago, and that he divorced Bell in 1974. On multiple occasions, Turner said that he was never legally married to Tina.

Following a violent altercation in July 1976, Tina filed for divorce on the grounds of irreconcilable differences. Their divorce was finalized on March 29, 1978. In the final divorce decree, Tina took responsibility for missed concert dates as well as an IRS lien. Tina retained songwriter royalties from songs she had written, but Ike received the publishing royalties for his compositions and hers. She also kept her two Jaguar cars, furs and jewelry along with her stage name. Tina gave up her share of their Bolic Sound recording studio, publishing companies, and real estate.

In her 1986 autobiography, Tina stated that Turner had been abusive during their marriage. She said: "It was my relationship with Ike that made me most unhappy. At first, I had really been in love with him. Look what he'd done for me. But he was totally unpredictable." Turner admitted he took Tina for granted and called her "the best woman I ever knew". In his autobiography, he said: "Sure, I've slapped Tina. We had fights and there have been times when I punched her to the ground without thinking. But I never beat her." In a 1999 interview, Roseanne Barr urged him to publicly apologize to Tina on The Roseanne Barr Show. In 2007, Turner told Jet that he had written Tina an apology letter, but had never sent it. In 2018, Tina told The Sunday Times that "as an old person, I have forgiven him, but I would not work with him. He asked for one more tour with me, and I said, 'No, absolutely not.' Ike wasn't someone you could forgive and allow him back in."

==== Later marriages ====
Turner married Margaret Ann Thomas in Las Vegas on April 11, 1981; they divorced in 1990. They had met in the mid-1960s at a concert in Bakersfield, California. According to Turner, Tina suggested Ann fill in as an Ikette; she could not sing, but she was attractive. Eventually, she moved into their View Park home. Turner stated, "I loved Tina, but I was in love with Ann Thomas." Their daughter Mia was born in January 1969. They rekindled their friendship years after their divorce, and she found Turner unconscious at his home the day he died.

Turner was introduced to St. Louis native singer Jeanette Bazzell by his son Ike Turner Jr. in 1988. She became his lead vocalist and they married in a private ceremony at Circus Circus Hotel & Resort in Las Vegas on July 4, 1995. They divorced in 2000, but later rekindled their friendship. According to Jeanette, Turner called her his "backbone". In 2019, she told Palm Spring Life that the film What's Love Got to Do with It "assassinated Ike's career. But more than that, it broke his heart". She added, "Ike doesn't get any recognition because of all the negative things [shown] in that movie and in his relationship with Tina... I went through things with Ike, too, but there's a time to forgive and to let go. To strip him from having the opportunity to get recognition in an area where he was entitled to deserve it, it's so wrong to me."

Turner met San Francisco native singer Audrey Madison through a mutual friend in 1993. She started as an Ikette before becoming his lead singer. They married at A Special Memory Wedding Chapel in Las Vegas on October 8, 2006. Turner filed for divorce two months later on December 22, but after the divorce was granted, they reconciled in 2007. In 2011, Audrey appeared as a contestant on The X Factor. In 2016, she released her memoir Love Had Everything to Do with It, which details her volatile relationship with Turner due to his bipolar disorder and schizophrenia. She told The Afro: "I decided to write it because it was like a cleansing and it released all of the trauma. Also, I wanted the general public to have a better outlook and perspective on where Ike was mentally and emotionally, because so often, as a nation, we turn on people who have mental health issues and define them by their behaviors rather than their condition."

=== Children ===
Turner had six children. He had two sons, Ike Turner III (1958–2025; aka Ike Turner Jr.) and Michael Turner (b. 1960), with Lorraine Taylor. He had a son, Ronald "Ronnie" Turner (1960–2022), with Tina Turner. Tina's son Craig Turner (1958–2018) with Raymond Hill was adopted by Turner and carried his surname. Craig died in an apparent suicide.

Turner had a daughter, Mia, with Ikette Ann Thomas. Her pregnancy was mentioned in Tina's book, I, Tina.

Turner's second wife, Velma Davis (née Dishman), claimed that Turner was the father of her daughter, Linda Turner Bullock (b. 1949). Turner denied her assertion in his autobiography, in which Velma is mistakenly referred to as Thelma: "I met Thelma Dishman, who, at that time, I thought was a pretty girl. Thelma was pregnant, not by me, but I liked her."

In 1988, Turner discovered that he had a daughter named Twanna Melby (b. 1959). Her mother, Pat Richard, had attended Sumner High School with Tina in St. Louis. In 1991, after Turner had completed 18 months of a prison sentence for cocaine intoxication and driving under the influence of cocaine, he was paroled into Twanna Melby's custody.

Ike Turner Jr. released an album, Hard Labor, in 1987. He won a Grammy Award for his involvement with Turner's 2006 album Risin' with the Blues. He toured with former Ikette Randi Love as Sweet Randi Love and The Love Thang Band.

Ronnie Turner was in a band called Manufactured Funk with songwriter and musician Patrick Moten. He played bass guitar in his mother's band after his parents divorced and he later played in his father's band. He married French singer Afida Turner in 2007. After his father's death, he told Jet magazine: "I loved my father very much... You can talk 5 or 10 minutes about the bad he's done. You can talk all night about the achievements he's had. He was successful with my mom and after my mom. He won a Grammy before he died. That's a lifetime achievement." Ronnie died from complications of colon cancer in 2022.

In 2017, Ike III stated that Michael Turner, who struggled with addiction as an adult, was by then using a wheelchair and had a history of "strokes and seizures". In 2018, Ike Jr. revealed that Michael was now "in a convalescent home in Southern California and needs medical support".

Ike Turner III died from kidney failure in 2025.

=== Legal problems and drug addiction ===
In 1960, Turner and two others were charged for "interstate transportation of forged checks and conspiracy". Turner plead not guilty and was forced to stand trial in St. Louis. The jury failed to reach a verdict at the first trial, but he was found not guilty at the retrial in 1961.

In 1974, Turner and three others were arrested for using illegal blue boxes at Bolic Sound studio to make long-distance phone calls. He was cleared of the charges.

Before the age of thirty, Turner did not use drugs or drink alcohol. He would fire anyone in his band who used any substances. Turner was first introduced to cocaine by "two very famous people" he had been working with at the International Hotel in Las Vegas. Producer D'Angela Proctor alleged in Turner's Unsung documentary that the two famous people were Elvis Presley and Redd Foxx. He took the cocaine home and tried it one night while writing songs at the piano. Turner said he liked the reduced need for sleep the drug gave him, which allowed him to write more music. By the early 1970s, he was heavily addicted to the drug, buying it in large quantities and sharing it with friends. Turner later estimated that he had spent $11 million on cocaine. His addiction caused a hole through his nasal septum, the pain of which he relieved by using more cocaine. He eventually began freebasing crack cocaine.

By the 1980s, Turner's finances were in disarray and he owed the state of California $12,802 in back taxes. He later settled his account. He had tried to sell his studio Bolic Sound to raise funds to avoid foreclosure, but the studio burned down on the day a potential buyer was scheduled to view it in January 1981.

During the 1980s, Turner was arrested multiple times for drug and firearm offenses, which resulted in two convictions.

- In 1980, a SWAT team raided his Bolic Sound studio, finding a live hand grenade and seven grams of cocaine. Turner received his first conviction for cocaine possession. He was sentenced to thirty days in the L.A. county jail with three years probation.
- In April 1981, Turner was arrested for shooting a 49-year-old newspaper delivery man. He accused the man of assaulting his wife Ann Thomas and of kicking his dog. Turner said he only fired a shot to scare him off and that the man had injured himself when he climbed over the fence to get away. A jury acquitted Turner of assault in 1982.
- In June 1985, Turner was arrested and charged with conspiracy to sell $16,000 worth of cocaine, possession and maintaining a residence for selling or using a controlled substance. The police took $1,000 worth of rock cocaine from his North Hollywood apartment. Record producer Eddie Coleman Jr. and music company writer Richard Lee Griffin were also arrested and charged. Turner was released on a $5,000 bond.
- In 1986, Turner was arrested for cocaine possession, concealed carry of a handgun and traffic violations; he was released on bail.
- In January 1987, Turner was arrested for trying to sell 10 ounces of cocaine to an undercover police officer; he pleaded not guilty.
- In May 1989, Turner was arrested on drug charges in West Hollywood. He was convicted of cocaine intoxication and driving under the influence of cocaine in January 1990. The next month he was sentenced to four years in prison. He was released on parole in September 1991 after completing 18 months of his sentence at California Men's Colony in San Luis Obispo. Larry Kamien, associate warden of the California Men's Colony, said Turner was a model inmate. In prison he became a trustee working in the library and saved $13,000 by selling cigarettes, candy bars, and coffee to other inmates.

Turner managed to break his dependency on cocaine while in prison and remained clean for more than ten years. He visited high schools during Black History Month to speak against drug use. While trying to help an acquaintance from crack addiction at a crack house he relapsed in 2004.

=== Health problems ===
In 2005, Turner revealed he had been diagnosed with emphysema, which required him to use an oxygen tank. His daughter Mia Turner said, "He was too weak from the emphysema to do anything. He'd go in the studio for a couple of minutes and play a couple of bars and say he had to go lay down." Despite his ill health, he collaborated with Gorillaz on their album Demon Days and performed the track with them at the Manchester Opera House in November 2005.

After his death in 2007, Turner's autopsy and toxicology report showed he was taking Seroquel at the time of his death. The medicine is most commonly used as treatment for bipolar disorder, Alzheimer's disease and schizophrenia. His ex-wife Audrey Madison claimed Turner was bipolar and that she was helping him with his illness, a claim supported by Turner's personal assistant and caretaker, Falina Rasool. Rasool said she talked to Turner about his bipolar disorder and witnessed its effects. "I would come in the room and see him change like a lightbulb, switch on and switch off. I did ask him about it. He said he made a song about it and we started laughing", said Rasool, referring to "Bi Polar" from the Grammy-winning album Risin' with the Blues. "I know I'm bipolar....And I've been bipolar, but a lot of people is bipolar", he told her. However, Turner's daughter, Mia Turner, disagreed with this diagnosis and felt he was being overmedicated.

=== Religious affiliation ===
Turner was raised a Baptist and reportedly converted to Judaism in 1994, but never spoke about it.

== Death ==
In the weeks leading up to his death, Turner became reclusive. On December 10, 2007, he told his assistant, Falina Rasool, that he believed he was dying and would not make it to Christmas. He died two days later, on December 12, at the age of 76, at his home in San Marcos, California. He was found by his former wife, Ann Thomas. Rasool was also in the house and administered CPR. Turner was pronounced dead at 11:38 a.m.

His funeral was held on December 21, 2007, at the City of Refuge Church in Gardena, California. Among those who spoke at the funeral were Little Richard, Solomon Burke and Phil Spector. The Kings of Rhythm played "Rocket 88" and "Proud Mary". Turner was cremated after the funeral service.

On January 16, 2008, the San Diego County Medical Examiner's Office reported that Turner had died from a cocaine overdose. "The cause of death for Ike Turner is cocaine toxicity with other significant conditions, such as hypertensive cardiovascular disease and pulmonary emphysema", Supervising Medical Examiner Investigator Paul Parker told CNN. His daughter Mia was said to be surprised at the coroner's assessment, believing his advanced stage emphysema was a larger factor.

Turner died without a valid will. Less than a week after his death, his former wife Audrey Madison Turner filed a petition stating that he had penned a handwritten will naming her as a beneficiary. In 2009, a judge ruled that the handwritten will was invalid and that Turner's children were legally the direct heirs to his estate.

== Awards and nominations ==
Turner has received various awards in recognition for his significant role as a pioneer of rock and roll.

- 2001: Inducted into the St. Louis Walk of Fame
- 2002: Inducted into the Mississippi Musicians Hall of Fame
- 2004: Memphis Heroes Award
- 2005: Inducted into Guitar Center's RockWalk
- 2007: Mojo Legend Award
- 2010: Inducted into the Clarksdale Walk of Fame
- 2015: Inducted into the Rhythm and Blues Music Hall of Fame
- 2015: Inducted into St. Louis Classic Rock Hall of Fame (with Tina Turner)

=== Blues Foundation Awards ===
Blues Music Awards

Year	Nominee / work	Award	Result
1981	Ike Turner's Kings Of Rhythm	Reissue album	Nominated
2002	Here and Now	Comeback Album of The Year	Won
2002	Here and Now	Soul Blues Album	Nominated
2002	Ike Turner	Soul Blues Male Artist	Nominated
2002	Ike Turner	Blues Entertainer of the Year	Nominated

Blues Hall of Fame

Year	Nominee / work	Award	Result
1991	"Rocket 88"	Classic of Blues Recording – Single or Album Track	Inducted
2005	Ike Turner	Performer	Inducted

=== Grammy Awards ===
Year	Nominee / work	Award	Result
1962	"It's Gonna Work Out Fine"	Best Rock & Roll Recording	Nominated
1970	A Black Man's Soul	Best R&B Instrumental Performance	Nominated
1972	"Proud Mary"	Best R&B Vocal Performance by a Group	Won
1975	"Father Alone"	Best Soul Gospel Performance	Nominated
1975	The Gospel According to Ike & Tina	Best Soul Gospel Performance	Nominated
2002	Here and Now	Best Traditional Blues Album	Nominated
2007	Risin' with the Blues	Best Traditional Blues Album	Won

Grammy Hall of Fame

Year	Nominee / work	Award	Result
1998	"Rocket 88" (as Jackie Brenston and his Delta Cats)	Hall of Fame (Single)	Inducted
1999	"River Deep – Mountain High"	Hall of Fame (Single)	Inducted
2003	"Proud Mary"	Hall of Fame (Single)	Inducted

=== Independent Music Awards ===
Year	Nominee / work	Award	Result
2007	Ike Turner — Risin' with the Blues	Blues Album	Nominated

=== Rock and Roll Hall of Fame ===
Year	Nominee / work	Award	Result
1991	Ike & Tina Turner	Hall of Fame – Performers	Inducted
2018	"Rocket 88" (as Jackie Brenston and his Delta Cats)	Hall of Fame – Singles	Inducted

== Selected discography ==
=== Studio albums ===
- 1962: Ike & Tina Turner's Kings of Rhythm Dance, Sue 2003
- 1963: Rocks The Blues, Crown CLP-5367/CST-367
- 1969: A Black Man's Soul, Pompeii SD-6003
- 1972: Blues Roots, United Artists UAS-5576
- 1973: Bad Dreams, United Artists UA-LA087-F
- 1980: The Edge (featuring Tina Turner and Home Grown Funk), Fantasy F-9597
- 2001: Here and Now, Ikon IKOCD-8850
- 2006: Risin' with the Blues, Zoho Roots ZM-200611

=== Live albums ===
- 2002: The Resurrection: Live Montreux Jazz Festival, Isabel IS 640202
- 2006: Ike Turner & The Kings Of Rhythm: Live In Concert, Charly Films CHF-F1014LF [DVD/2CD]

=== Compilations ===
- 1976: Sun: The Roots Of Rock: Volume 3: Delta Rhythm Kings, Charly CR 30103
- 1976: I'm Tore Up, Red Lightnin' RL0016
- 1984: Hey Hey, Red Lightin' RL-0047 [2LP]
- 1994: I Like Ike! The Best of Ike Turner, Rhino R2-71819
- 2001: The Sun Sessions, Varèse Sarabande 302 066 232 2
- 2004: His Woman, Her Man: The Ike Turner Diaries— Unreleased Funk/Rock 1970–1973
- 2004: The Bad Man: Rare & Unreissued Ike Turner Produced Recordings 1962–1965, Night Train International NTICD-7139
- 2004: King Cobra: The Chicago Sessions, Fuel 2000 302 061 390 2
- 2006: The Chronological: Ike Turner 1951–1954, Classics Blues & Rhythm Series 5176
- 2008: Classic Early Sides 1952–1957, JSP 4203 [2CD]
- 2011: Rocket 88: The Original 1951–1960 R&B and Rock & Roll Sides, Soul Jam 600803
- 2011: That Kat Sure Could Play! (The Singles 1951 To 1957), Secret SECBX-025 [4CD]
- 2011: Jack Rabbit Blues: The Singles of 1958–1960, Secret SECSP-041
- 2012: Ike Turner Studio Productions: New Orleans and Los Angeles 1963–1965, Ace CDCHD-1329
- 2017: She Made My Blood Run Cold, Southern Routes SR-CD-3502

=== Recordings as a sideman ===
Howlin' Wolf

- 1962: Wolf Sings the Blues

Albert King

- 1962: The Big Blues

Earl Hooker

- 1969: Sweet Black Angel

Gorillaz

- 2005: Demon Days
