= Clarksdale Walk of Fame =

- Sponsored by: The Clarksdale/Coahoma County Chamber of Commerce
- Location: Clarksdale, Mississippi
- Country: United States
- Reward: Bronze plaque embedded into the sidewalk
- First award: 2008

The Clarksdale Walk of Fame honors notable people from Clarksdale, Mississippi who have made their mark on the culture of Clarksdale. It was created in 2008 by the Clarksdale/Coahoma County Chamber of Commerce as a self-guided walking tour in an effort to increase foot traffic in downtown Clarksdale. The plaques are located near a site of historical significance associated with the honoree. Singer Sam Cooke received the first plaque, dedicated outside the New Roxy theater where he once performed.

Also in Clarksdale is the Blues Alley Walk of Fame which was a precursor to the Clarksdale Walk of Fame. Blues musician John Lee Hooker and the Texas-based rock band ZZ Top were honored. ZZ Top helped raise $1 million in support of the Delta Blues Museum, they have a plaque at the Carnegie Public Library (former location of the museum).

== Inductees ==
Honoree	Location
Sam Cooke	New Roxy Theater, 357 Issaquena Avenue
Son House	Cat Head Delta Blues & Folk Art, 252 Delta Avenue
Muddy Waters	Clarksdale Station Train Depot, Blues Alley
Tennessee Williams	St. George's Episcopal Church Rectory, 108 Sharkey Avenue
John Clark	Clark House, 211 Clark Street
Early Wright	Alcazar Hotel, 127 Third Street
Charlie Conerly	Hambone Art Gallery, 111 East 2nd Street
Perian Conerly	Hambone Art Gallery, 111 East 2nd Street
Aaron Henry	Martin Luther King Boulevard and Ashton Alley
Ike Turner	Delta Blues Museum, 1 Blues Alley
Super Chikan	Ground Zero Blues Club, 0 Blues Alley
Big Jack Johnson	Red's Blues Club, 398 Sunflower Ave
