= W. C. Handy Theatre =

Theater in Tennessee, US

Coordinates: 35°6′30″N 89°59′2″W

The W. C. Handy Theatre was a movie theater at 2355 Park Avenue in Memphis, Tennessee. The venue was built for the African-American community during segregation. The theater was opened in 1947 and it also served music venue. The building was demolished in 2012.

== History ==
The W. C. Handy Theatre was located at 2355 Park Avenue in the Orange Mound neighborhood of southeast Memphis. The 1,275-capacity theater cost $200,000 to build. In the lobby, there was a milk bar for theater patrons and transient passers-by. There was a stage for top African-American entertainers to perform at the venue.

The theater was named in honor of musician W.C. Handy, the father of the Blues. A life-sized portrait of Handy was displayed in the lobby, and every program began with the recording of his song "St. Louis Blues" and closed with his song "Memphis Blues."

Before the theater was opened, there was some controversy regarding its construction in 1946. The City Board of Adjustment received a petition signed by 113 people objecting to the theater when Chalmers Cullins and his associates applied for permits for the theater and shops on Park Avenue. Cullins and his associate Nate Evans responded that the opposition was due to the interest of people who built a theater nearby on Carnes Avenue. However, many residents supported the plan for theater in the neighborhood. Evans presented a petition signed by 309 residents in favor of the theater.

The theater opened with performances by Cootie Williams' orchestra, Mantan Moreland and Company, the Congaroos, and Miller and Boojie on May 11, 1947. W.C. Handy made a personal appearance during the first four days.

Although the venue was built for African Americans, there were segregated shows for white patrons to attend.

On October 31, 1953, the first all-Black television show was broadcast on WMCT. The amateur show was filmed on Saturday nights at the W.C. Handy Theatre. The amateurs competed for cash prizes on a show featuring the comedy duo Rufus and Bones; Rufus Thomas was the master of ceremonies.

The cinema continued to operate in the 1960s. After years of abandonment, the building was demolished in 2012.

== Notable performers ==
Notable entertainers who performed at the W.C. Handy Theatre include:

- W. C. Handy
- Cootie Williams
- Mantan Moreland
- Count Basie
- Lionel Hampton
- Ike Turner and the Kings of Rhythm
- Jackie Brenston
- The Dominos
- The Clovers
- Lynn Hope
- Duke Ellington
- Johnny Hodges
- Ray Nance
