= Driftin' Slim =

American musician

Driftin' Slim (February 24, 1919 – September 15, 1977) was an American blues singer, guitarist and harmonica player.

== Biography ==
Born Elmon Mickle in Keo, Arkansas, United States, he not only recorded as Driftin' Slim, but also as Model 'T' Slim and under his real name. His recordings were released on the - amongst others - Modern, RPM, Blue Horizon, Styletone, Milestone, Kent, and Flyright record labels.

By the turn of the 1970s, ill health had forced Slim to retire from the music industry and when he died, a chapter of American music — that of the one-man band — had virtually died with him. Slim died from cancer in Los Angeles, California, in September 1977.

== Discography ==
=== Singles ===
Year	Name(s) on record	Single (A-side/B-side)	Label #	Notes
1951	Drifting Slim/Drifting Smith	"My Little Machine"/"Down South Blues"	Modern 849	rec. November 1951 in North Little Rock, AR; Elmon Mickle, voc, hca; Junior Brooks, Baby Face Turner, g; Bill Russell, dr
1952	Drifting Slim With Rhythm Acc.	"Good Morning Baby"/"My Sweet Woman"	RPM 370	rec. March 1952 in North Little Rock, AR; Elmon Mickle, voc, hca; Sunny Blair, hca; Ike Turner, p; Baby Face Turner, g; Bill Russell, dr
1959	Elmon Mickle	"Flat Foot Sam"/"I Got To Get Some Money"	Elko 003	rec. November 1959 in Los Angeles, CA; Elmon Mickle, voc, hca; Phillip Walker, g; Bobby Tinsley, dr
1960	Elmon Mickle	"Jackson Blues"/"Lonesome Highway"	E. M. Records 132	rec. Los Angeles 1959; Elmon Mickle, voc, hca, g
1960	Elmon Mickle & Ernie Pruitt	"Whatever You're Doing, Keep On Doing It To Me"/"Short 'n' Fat"	E. M. and E. P. Records 133	
1962	Elmon Mickle With Rhythm Acc.	"Independent Walk"/"Short And Fat"	JGEMS 1908	
1966	Model "T" Slim	"Jackson, Tennessee"/"Shake Your Boogie"	Magnum 45-739	
1966	Model T. Slim	"Good Morning Little Schoolgirl"/"Shake Your Boogie"	Wonder 15001/2	
1966	Model T. Slim	""T" Model Ford"/"Burnt Out"	Wonder 1401/2	
1967	Model "T" Slim	"Somebody Voodooed The Hoodooman"/"You're Growing Old Baby"	Audio Blues AB 1932	
1967	Model "T" Slim	"Woman's The Glory Of Man"/"Take My Hand"	Audio Blues AB 1933	
