= Milestone Records =

American record label

- Parent company: Concord
- Founded: 1966
- Founder: Orrin Keepnews; Dick Katz
- Genre: Jazz, blues
- Country of origin: U.S.
- Location: New York City

Milestone Records is an American jazz record company and label founded in 1966 by Orrin Keepnews and Dick Katz in New York City. The company was bought by Fantasy Records in 1972. Since then, it has produced LP reissues (including items from Keepnew's earlier Riverside label) as well as new recordings. Sonny Rollins and McCoy Tyner are among the musicians who recorded for the label.

Milestone has reissued many historic jazz recording sessions, including the Jelly Roll Morton, King Oliver, and the New Orleans Rhythm Kings sides made for Gennett Records in the 1920s. The label also issued blues albums, most of them produced by Pete Welding. They include Driftin' Slim & His Blues Band's Somebody Hoo-Doo'd The Hoo-Doo Man, in addition to LPs by Mississippi Fred McDowell and Big Joe Williams.

Another company called Milestone Records was active in the late 1950s, releasing music by acts such as The Jodimars and The Blue Jays. This label was owned by rockabilly musician Werly Fairburn.
