= Ernest Lane (musician) =

Background information
- Born: Ernest Ray Lane; March 16, 1931; Clarksdale, Mississippi, U.S.
- Died: July 8, 2012 (aged 81) Culver City, California, U.S.
- Genres: Blues, R&B
- Occupation: Musician
- Instruments: Piano, organ
- Years active: 1949–2012
- Labels: Blues & Rhythm, Sony, Rooster Blues, Aristocrat, Evejim

Ernest Ray Lane (March 16, 1931 – July 8, 2012) was an American blues pianist. He played various blues musicians and bands, including with Pinetop Perkins, Robert Nighthawk, Ike Turner, George "Harmonica" Smith, and Canned Heat. Lane also released singles and album as a solo artist.

== Life and career ==
Lane was born on March 16, 1931, in Clarksdale, Mississippi. Lane and his siblings, three sisters and two brothers, lived with his mother Ethel Thomas in Clarksdale. His father, John Lane, was a painter in a part of town called Overtown. Lane and his childhood friend Ike Turner spent time living with Lane's father who also played ragtime piano. One day, Lane and Turner heard blues pianist Pinetop Perkins playing boogie-woogie at his father's house. His playing piqued their interest, and Perkins taught them how to play piano.

Lane lied about his age to join the Army; he soon returned to Clarksdale.

In 1949, Lane accompanied guitarist Robert Nighthawk on piano during a session that produced "Black Angel Blues (Sweet Black Angel)" and "Annie Lee Blues" for Aristocrat Records. The recordings were released under the name The Nighthawks, who were Nighthawk, Lane, and bassist Willie Dixon. The single "Annie Lee Blues" reached #13 on the Billboard R&B chart on December 31, 1949.

In 1952, Lane released his first single under his own name, "What's Wrong, Baby?" on Blues & Rhythm Records, which was a short lived label founded and run by Saul Bihari. Lane relocated to California in 1956 where he performed with Jimmy Nolen and George "Harmonica" Smith. He joined the Ike & Tina Turner Revue in the early 1960s, resulting in the release of his single "What's That You've Got" on Turner's Sony label in 1963.

Lane performed with Earl Hooker and Houston Stackhouse on the Chitlin Circuit. He relocated to California in 1956 where he performed with Jimmy Nolen and George "Harmonica" Smith. Lane joined the Ike & Tina Turner Revue in the early 1960s, resulting in his single "What's That You've Got" / "Need My Help" released on Turner's Sony label in 1963. He later recorded with the Monkees and Canned Heat.

Lane retired from the music industry for years until he joined his childhood friend Ike Turner for his musical comeback in the late 1990s. As a part of the Kings of Rhythm, Lane played piano on Turner's Grammy-nominated album Here And Now (2001) and the Grammy-winning album Risin' With The Blues (2006). Lane led the band at Turner's funeral in 2007, performing his classics songs.

Lane released three solo under his own name, The Blues Is Back! (2004), Born with the Blues (2008), and 72 Miles From Memphis (2011).

Lane died at Brotman Hospital in Culver City, California on July 8, 2012. He is buried at Riverside National Cemetery.

== Discography ==
=== Singles ===
- 1963: "What's That You've Got" / "Need My Help" (Sony 114)
- 1984: "Doggin' No More" / "Little Girl" (Rooster Blues R 50)

==== Singles as a sideman ====
- 1949: "Annie Lee Blues"/"Black Angel Blues" (Aristocrat 2301) – The Nighthawks

=== Albums ===
- 2004: The Blues Is Back! (Acoustic Music Records)
- 2008: Born with the Blues (Evejim Records)
- 2011: 72 Miles From Memphis (Acoustic Music Records)

==== Albums as a sideman ====
- 1969: Hallelujah – Canned Heat
- 1970: Future Blues – Canned Heat
- 1972 Sneakin' Around – Canned Heat
- 2001: Here And Now – Ike Turner & The Kings of Rhythm
- 2006: Risin' With The Blues – Ike Turner
- 2012: Ike Turner Studio Productions New Orleans And Los Angeles 1963-1965
- 2012: Trouble Up The Road: The Recordings 1961 – Ike Turner
