= Delta Blues Museum =

- Yazoo and Mississippi Valley Passenger Depot
- U.S. National Register of Historic Places
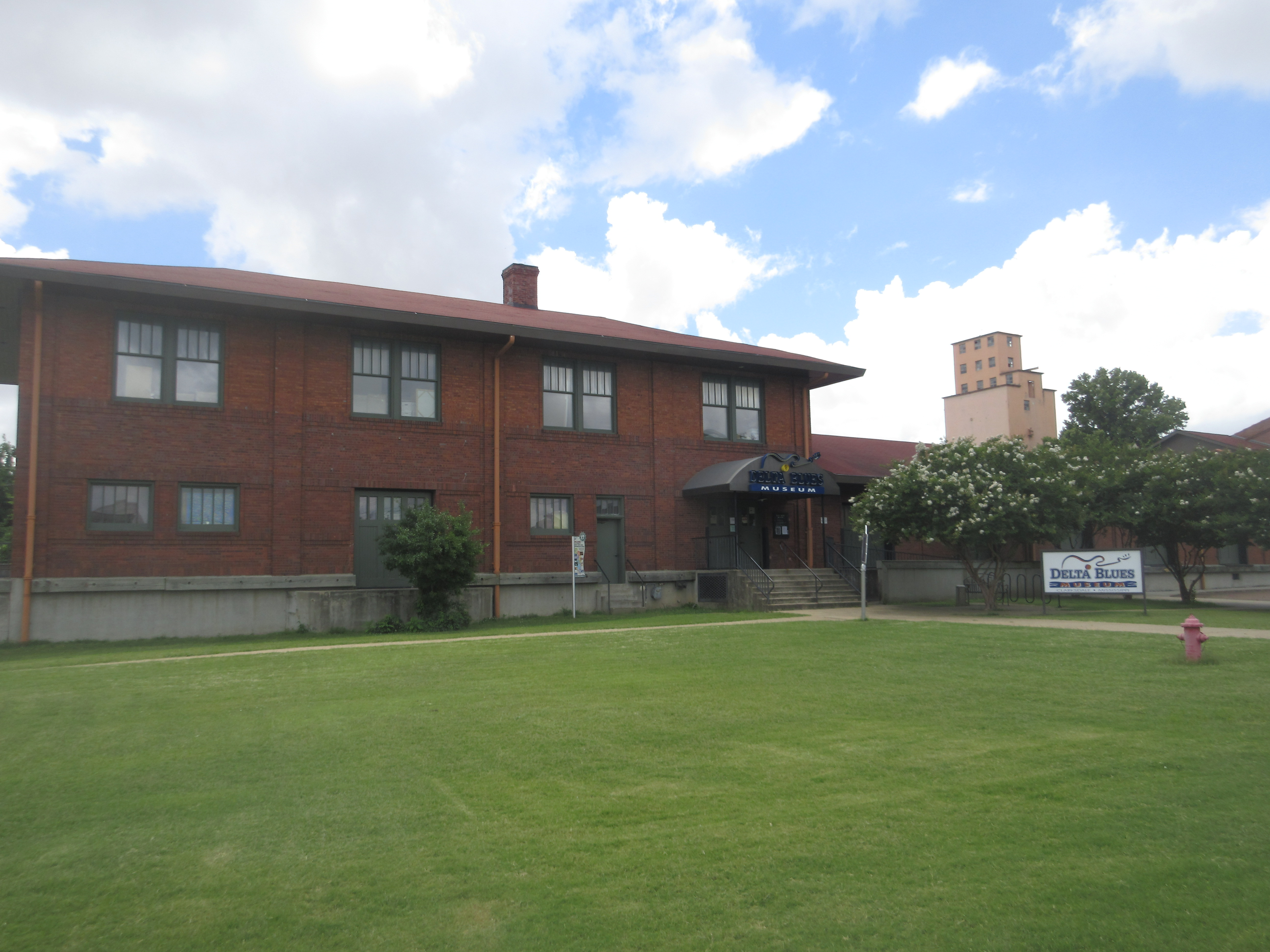
- Exterior of the museum in 2017

- Location within Mississippi Location within the United States
- Location: Bounded by N. Edwards, Sharkey and Issaquena Aves., and the ICRR main track, Clarksdale, Mississippi, United States
- Coordinates: 34°12′3″N 90°34′15″W
- Built: 1926; 100 years ago
- NRHP reference No.: 95001194
- Added to NRHP: October 31, 1995

The Delta Blues Museum in Clarksdale, Mississippi, United States, is a museum dedicated to collecting, preserving, and providing public access to and awareness of the musical genre known as the blues. Along with holdings of significant blues-related memorabilia, the museum also exhibits and collects art portraying the blues tradition, including works by sculptor Floyd Shaman and photographer Birney Imes.

The museum is located in the Yazoo and Mississippi Valley Passenger Depot, also known as Illinois Central Passenger Depot or Clarksdale Passenger Depot, which was built in 1926 and listed on the National Register of Historic Places in 1995.

== Museum ==
The museum houses many artifacts related to the blues, notably the shack where blues legend Muddy Waters purportedly lived in his youth on Stovall Plantation, near Clarksdale. The shack was restored to structural stability through the intercession of Isaac Tigrett, the House of Blues owner, and transported from Stovall Plantation on a tour of HoB venues before being returned to Mississippi to the museum and rebuilt inside.

There is a 2003 30-minute documentary of the same name.

In 2013, a marker was placed outside of the museum as part of the Mississippi Blues Trail.

The museum has been visited by many notable artists such as Eric Clapton and Paul Simon. The Texas-based rock band ZZ Top, especially front man Billy Gibbons, have made this museum their pet project and have raised thousands of dollars in support.

The museum also focuses on educating young people interested in learning to play musical instruments.

== Railroad building ==
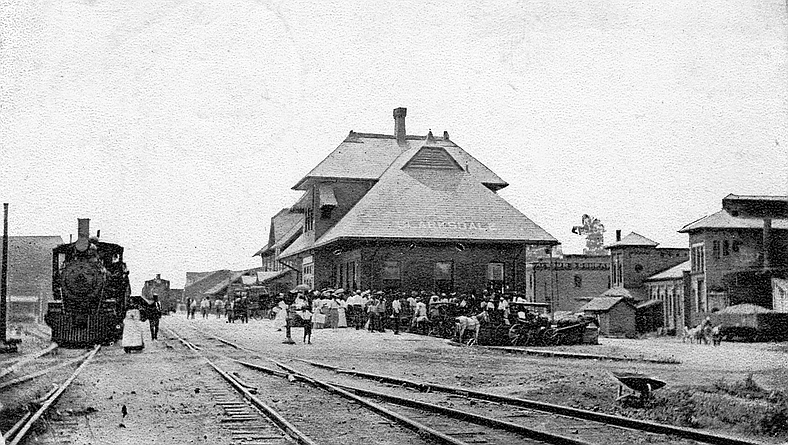
Clarksdale Passenger Depot in the early 1900s

External videos
- Mississippi Roads; Delta Blues Museum, 26:46, Mississippi Public Broadcasting

The building was added to the National Register of Historic Places in 1995. The museum then moved into the former railroad depot in 1999. The circa 1918 brick building served as the passenger rail depot of the Yazoo and Mississippi Valley Railroad and later the freight depot of Illinois Central Railroad.

== See also ==
- List of music museums
- Mississippi Blues Trail
- Yazoo & Mississippi Depot in Baton Rouge, Louisiana
- KFFA (AM)
- Ground Zero Blues Club
- National Blues Museum
- Clarksdale Walk of Fame

| Preceding station | Illinois Central Railroad | Following station |
|---|---|---|
| Bobo toward New Orleans | Yazoo and Mississippi Valley Railroad Main Line | Lyon toward Memphis |
| Claremont toward Jackson | Clarksdale – Jackson | Terminus |
| Claremont toward Yazoo City | Yazoo City – Clarksdale | Terminus |
