= The Gospel According to Ike & Tina =

Studio album by Ike & Tina Turner
- Released: April 1974
- Recorded: October – November 1973
- Studio: Bolic Sound
- Genre: Gospel
- Label: United Artists
- Producer: Ike Turner

Ike & Tina Turner chronology
Nutbush City Limits (1973)	The Gospel According to Ike & Tina (1974)	Sweet Rhode Island Red (1974)

Singles from The Gospel According to Ike & Tina
- 1. "Father Alone" Released: 1974

The Gospel According to Ike & Tina is a studio album by Ike & Tina Turner, released on United Artists Records in 1974.

== Content and release ==
The album features the Turners both singing lead on new arrangements of gospel standards. Ike's rendition of "Farther Along" (revised as "Father Alone") was released as a single and earned him a Grammy nomination.

The Gospel According to Ike & Tina showcased Ike Turner's experimentation with synthesizer arrangements, showcasing the possibilities of the newly introduced electronic instruments. The synthesizers used in the album were provided by ARP Instruments of Needham, Massachusetts, which was one of the leading electronic instrument manufacturers in the early-to-mid 1970s.

The album was recorded in the Ike & Tina Turner's Bolic Sound studios in Inglewood. Their state-of the-art studio boasted of their own Minimoog and ARP synthesizers at the time.

== Critical reception ==
Professional ratings
Review scores
Source	Rating
AllMusic	3.5/5 stars

The album was met with good critical reception. Billboard praised the record as a "successful attempt to bring the commercial world of soul music to the church."

Record World (May 4, 1974): "Mr. & Ms. Rockin' Soul transform traditional religious songs into commercially viable compositions. Much credit goes to Ike for superb adaptations, and his solemn voice lends itself well to the material, especially on 'Father Alone'. Tina's topper: 'Amazing Grace'."

Cash Box (May 4, 1974):

The religious background that's so often a part of the music of today's biggest stars emerges here on Ike and Tina's latest UA LP, a collection of gospel oriented material that sparkles with deep feeling and righteousness. 'Father Alone' is a marvelous spiritual sung by Ike and each cut builds the fervor initiated by this talented team, culminating in the classic 'When the Saints Go Marching ln'.

== Awards and nominations ==
The Gospel According to Ike & Tina was nominated for Best Soul Gospel Performance at the 17th Annual Grammy Awards. Ike's single "Father Alone" also received a Grammy nomination for Best Soul Gospel Performance.

== Reissues ==
The Gospel According to Ike & Tina was reissued on CD by Fuel 2000 in 2002. The album was digitally remastered and released by BGO Records on the compilation CD Sweet Rhode Island Red/The Gospel According To Ike & Tina in 2012.

== Track listing ==
All songs arranged and adapted by Ike Turner, except where noted.

Side A
No.	Title	Writer(s)	Length
1.	"Father Alone"	Spencer Taylor	4:17
2.	"Walk with Me (I Need You Lord to Be My Friend)"		3:40
3.	"Glory, Glory"		3:10
4.	"Just a Closer Walk with Thee"		6:17
5.	"What a Friend We Have in Jesus"	Joseph M. Scriven, Charles Crozat Converse	2:50

Side B
No.	Title	Writer(s)	Length
1.	"Amazing Grace"	John Newton, William Walker	2:36
2.	"Take My Hand Precious Lord"	Thomas A. Dorsey	2:48
3.	"Nearer the Cross"	Christian William Dieckmann - Fanny Crosby	2:26
4.	"Our Lord Will Make a Way"		3:38
5.	"When the Saints Go Marching In"		3:03
