= Zoho Music =

- Founded: September 2003
- Founder: Joachim Becker
- Distributors: MVD Entertainment Group; Pennsylvania (CDs); CD Baby (digital and streaming)
- Genre: Cuban salsa; merengue; bachata; cumbia; creole jazz; blues; R&B; rock; classical
- Country of origin: United States
- Location: Millwood, New York, U.S.
- Official website: http://www.zohomusic.com

Zoho Music is a Latin jazz independent record label based in New York, founded by Joachim Becker in 2003. In 2005, the label expanded to blues, R&B, Southern and classic rock on the Zoho Roots imprint. The catalog consists of over 180 CD releases, which includes three Grammy Award-winning albums and three Latin Grammy Award-winning albums.

== History ==
German-born Joachim Becker moved to the United States in 1980, eventually settling in Millwood, New York in 1986. In 2000, Becker co-founded the label Khaeon, which lasted for three years before it was folded. In September 2003, Becker founded Zoho Music, bringing some artists from Khaeon. His first signing was American jazz bassist Harvie S. The last album by Puerto Rican percussionist and bandleader Ray Barretto, Standards Rican-ditioned, was posthumously on Zoho Music before his death in 2006.

In 2005, the label received its first Recording Academy award, a Latin Grammy award for Best Tango Album, awarded to Bajo Cero by Argentine pianist Pablo Ziegler.

In 2007, blues musician Ike Turner won a Grammy Award for Best Traditional Blues Album for his Zoho Roots release Risin' with the Blues. Arturo O'Farrill won a Grammy for Best Latin Jazz Album in 2009 for his album Song for Chico. Pablo Ziegler's album Jazz Tango won for Best Latin Jazz Album in 2018.

== Roster ==
Artists on Zoho Music have included:

- Ray Barretto
- Bobby Sanabria
- Carlos Barbosa-Lima
- Claudia Acuña
- Arturo O'Farrill
- Pablo Ziegler
- Hendrik Meurkens
- Duduka Da Fonseca
- Trio Da Paz
- Hector Martignon
- Leo Brouwer
- Harvie S
- Vic Juris
- Judi Silvano
- Edsel Gomez

Artists on Zoho Roots have included:

- Bonnie Bramlett
- The Brothers of the Southland
- The Amazing World Of Arthur Brown
- Jimmy Hall
- The Persuasions
- Michael Powers
- The Pretty Things
- Swamp Cabbage
- Ike Turner
- Walter "Wolfman" Washington
- Jay Willie Blues Band
