= Big Break (American TV series) =

- Presented by: Natalie Cole
- No. of seasons: 1
- No. of episodes: 24

Original release
- Network: Syndication
- Release: September 15, 1990 – February 23, 1991

Big Break is an American talent contest television show hosted by singer Natalie Cole. The weekly one-hour program featured singers and musicians competing for a $100,000 prize with guest appearances. Winners from each week competed in the semi-finals and then the final; voting was done by the studio audience. R&B singer-songwriter and record producer R. Kelly won the prize before his stardom as a member of the group MGM (Mentally Gifted Men). The show lasted for one season.

Celebrity guests who appeared on the show include Whitney Houston, Patti LaBelle, Bill Cosby, MC Hammer, Michael McDonald, and Regina Belle.
