= Bad Dreams (Ike Turner album) =

Studio album by Ike Turner
- Released: July 1973
- Recorded: March 1973
- Studio: Bolic Sound, Inglewood, California
- Genre: R&B; psychedelic; blues; rock and roll; spoken word; soul
- Label: United Artists
- Producer: Ike Turner, Warren Dawson, Soko Richardson

Ike Turner chronology
Blues Roots (1972)	Bad Dreams (1973)	The Edge (1980)

Bad Dreams is a studio album by musician Ike Turner released on United Artists Records in 1973. The album cover was illustrated by Mike Salisbury who also created the cover for the Ike & Tina Turner album Live! The World of Ike & Tina.

== Critical reception ==
Professional ratings
Review scores
Source	Rating
AllMusic	4/5 stars
Christgau's Record Guide	B

Reviewing the album in Christgau's Record Guide: Rock Albums of the Seventies, Robert Christgau wrote:

After twenty years of raking it in from the shadows, he's finally figured out a way of applying his basically comic bass/baritone to rock and roll. Studio-psychedelic New Orleans, echoes of the Band and Dr. John, some brilliant minor r&b mixed in with the dumb stuff. My God—at the moment he's more interesting than Tina.

== Reissues ==
Bad Dreams was reissued in 2012 by BGO Records on the compilation CD Blues Roots/Bad Dreams.

== Track listing ==
All tracks written by Ike Turner except where noted.

Side A
No.	Title	Writer(s)	Length
1.	"These Dreams"		2:53
2.	"That's How Much I Love You"	Eddy Arnold, Wally Fowler, Graydon J. Hall	2:52
3.	"One Nite Stand"		3:27
4.	"Don't Hold Your Breath"		3:45
5.	"(You Can Have) The City"		3:42

Side B
No.	Title	Writer(s)	Length
1.	"Flockin' With You"		2:50
2.	"Take a Walk With Me"		3:36
3.	"Later for You Baby"	Eddie "Guitar Slim" Jones	2:37
4.	"Rats"		4:00
5.	"I Love the Way You Love"	Berry Gordy, Mikaljon (Mike Ossman, Al Abrams, John "Jun" O'Den)	2:42

== Personnel ==
Technical

- Barry Keene, John Mills, Ike Turner - engineer
- Mike Salisbury - design
- W.T. Vinson - cover illustration
