= Jack Rabbit Blues: The Singles of 1958–1960 =

Jack Rabbit Blues

Compilation album by Ike Turner
- Released: October 10, 2011
- Recorded: 1958–1960
- Genre: Blues, rock and roll
- Label: Secret Records

Ike Turner chronology
That Kat Sure Could Play!: The Singles 1951 To 1957 (2011)	Jack Rabbit Blues (2011)	Trouble Up The Road: The Recordings 1961 (2012)

Professional ratings
Review scores
Source	Rating
Allmusic	4/5 stars

Jack Rabbit Blues is a compilation album of recordings by musician Ike Turner released on Secret Records in 2011. The packaging includes a 31 track CD plus a 10-inch vinyl.

In the 1950s, Turner discovered many blues musicians when he was a talent scout. He was also a bandleader and a session musician. This compilation is a selection of recordings that Turner composed and/or played on between 1958 and 1960. The artist featured in this compilation include Kenneth Churchill, Otis Rush, Betty Everett, Buddy Guy and his own band the Kings of Rhythm. It also includes the first recording of his future wife Tina Turner (Little Ann).

== Track listing ==
All tracks written by Ike Turner except where noted. Each track features Turner either on guitar, piano and/or vocals.

No.	Title	Writer(s)	Length
1.	"Box Top" (Ike Turner, Carlson Oliver & Little Ann)		2:09
2.	"Chalypso Love Cry" (Ike Turner Orchestra, vocal by Fred Sample)		2:32
3.	"Fate Of Rock And Roll" (Kenneth Churchill, The Lyrics & Ike Turner Orchestra)		2:03
4.	"Would You Rather" (Kenneth Churchill, The Lyrics & Ike Turner Orchestra)		2:37
5.	"Call Your Name" (Chuck Bernard & His Blue Notes)	Chuck Bernard	2:16
6.	"Everytime I Think Of You" (Chuck Bernard & His Blue Notes)	Chuck Bernard	3:23
7.	"Double Trouble" (Otis Rush & His Band)	Otis Rush	2:44
8.	"Keep On Loving Me Baby" (Otis Rush & His Band)	Otis Rush	2:21
9.	"I'll Weep No More" (Betty Everett & The Willie Dixon Band)	Willie James Dixon	2:52
10.	"Tell Me Darling" (Betty Everett & The Willie Dixon Band)	Willie James Dixon	2:05
11.	"All Your Love (I Miss Loving)" (Otis Rush & His Band)	Otis Rush	2:38
12.	"My Baby Is A Good 'Un" (Otis Rush & His Band)	Otis Rush	2:40
13.	"Walking Down The Aisle" (Ike Turner's Kings Of Rhythm)		2:14
14.	"Box Top" (Ike Turner's Kings Of Rhythm)		1:57
15.	"You Sure Can't Do" (Buddy Guy)	Lucious Porter Weaver	2:40
16.	"(I Know) You Don't Love Me" (Ike Turner's Kings Of Rhythm)		2:11
17.	"Down And Out" (Ike Turner's Kings Of Rhythm)		3:08
18.	"In Your Eyes Baby" (Icky Renrut)		2:13
19.	"Jack Rabbit" (Icky Renrut)		2:27
20.	"Angel Of Love" (Bobby Foster)	Jane Basung	2:32
21.	"Star Above" (Bobby Foster)	Fred F. Stevens	2:29
22.	"Hey...Hey" (Icky Renrut)		2:03
23.	"Ho...Ho" (Icky Renrut)		2:29
24.	"That's All I Need" (Ike Turner & The Kings Of Rhythm)		2:26
25.	"My Love" (Ike Turner & The Kings Of Rhythm)		2:18
26.	"It's Alright" (Art Lassiter)	Art Lassiter	2:30
27.	"My Loneliness" (Art Lassiter)	Art Lassiter	2:15
28.	"A Fool In Love" (Ike & Tina Turner)		2:52
29.	"The Way You Love Me" (Ike & Tina Turner)		1:52
30.	"You're My Baby" (Ike & Tina Turner)		2:20
31.	"A Fool Too Long" (Ike & Tina Turner)		2:40

=== 10 inch vinyl ===
No.	Title	Length
1.	"Box Top" (Ike Turner, Carlson Oliver & Little Ann)	2:07
2.	"Chalypso Love Cry" (Ike Turner Orchestra, vocal by Fred Sample)	2:30
