= Here and Now (Ike Turner album) =

Studio album by Ike Turner & The Kings of Rhythm
- Released: May 22, 2001
- Genre: Blues; soul
- Length: 41:49
- Label: IKON
- Producer: Ike Turner

Ike Turner & The Kings of Rhythm chronology
I Like Ike! The Best of Ike Turner (1994)	Here and Now (2001)	The Sun Sessions (2001)

Here and Now is a studio album released by Ike Turner & the Kings of Rhythm on IKON Records in 2001. This is Turner's first solo album since Bad Dreams in 1973, when he was still the bandleader of the Ike & Tina Turner Revue. The album earned Grammy Award nomination in the category of Best Traditional Blues Album

== Critical reception ==
Professional ratings
Review scores
Source	Rating
AllMusic	2.5/5 stars
The Penguin Guide to Blues Recordings	3/4 stars
Rolling Stone	3/5 stars
Vibe	3/5 stars

Reviewing the album for Rolling Stone, Robert Christgau wrote: "Though his typically expert band hits the groove on all cylinders, his raspy vocal could use an oil change...Ike can still get it up, definitely. But how much he enjoys it isn't as clear as it should be."

Reviewing the album for The Austin Chronicle, Jay Trachtenberg wrote:

He obviously brings a lot to the table, and fortunately Turner shares the bounty with us on this rock-solid offering. Immediately apparent is how well he integrates the traditional delta roots of his Clarksdale salad days with the funkier, uptown sounds of contemporary blues on tunes like "You Can't Winnum' All," "Gave You What You Wanted," and "I Need A-Nuddin'."

== Awards and nominations ==
Here and Now was nominated for two W.C. Handy Awards from the Blues Foundation, winning one for Comeback Album of the Year in 2002. The album was nominated for a Grammy Award for Best Traditional Blues Album at the 44th Annual Grammy Awards.

== Track listing ==
Here and Now track listing
No.	Title	Length
1.	"Tore Up"	3:26
2.	"Baby's Got It"	3:22
3.	"You Can't Winnum' All"	4:38
4.	"Ike's Theme"	2:22
5.	"Catfish Blues"	4:08
6.	"Gave You What You Wanted"	4:08
7.	"I Need-A-Nuddin"	3:41
8.	"Swanee River Boogie"	2:36
9.	"Feelin' Low Down"	4:12
10.	"Rocket 88"	2:22
11.	"Cold Day In Hell"	6:53

== Personnel ==
- Ike Turner – vocals; guitar; bass guitar and drums on tracks 1–3, 5–7, 9, 10; piano on tracks 2, 3, 5, 8
- Ernest Lane – piano on tracks 2, 3, 5, 8
- Joe Kelly – lead guitar on tracks 1–11
- James Lewis – additional guitar
- Kevin Cooper – bass guitar on tracks 1–3, 5–7, 9, 10
- Dell Akins – upright bass on tracks 4, 8, 11
- Preston Wilcox – drums on tracks 1–3, 5–7, 9, 10
- Tony Coleman – drums on tracks 4, 8, 11
- Steve Potts – overdubbed drums on tracks 1–3, 5–7, 9, 10
- Kenny Krizzelle – harmonica
- Jim Spake – horn solo on track 7
- Lannie McMillan – horns on tracks 1–3, 5–7, 9, 10
- Andrew Love – horns on tracks 1–3, 5–7, 9, 10
- James Mitchell – horns on tracks 1–3, 5–7, 9, 10
- Scott Thompson – horns on tracks 4, 8, 11
- Mac Johnson – horns on tracks 4, 8, 11
- Evan Pigford – horns on tracks 4, 8, 11
- Ernid Field – horns on tracks 4, 8, 11
- Louis Taylor – horns on tracks 4, 8, 11
- Dan Bell – horns on tracks 4, 8, 11

The album was mastered by Scott Hull and engineered by Turner, Lucha Phillips, Benjamin Wright, Lamont Dozier, Leonard Jackson, Bill Dashell and William Brown.
