= Blues Roots =

Studio album by Ike Turner
- Released: June 1972
- Recorded: 1971 & 1972
- Studio: Bolic Sound, Inglewood, California
- Genre: Blues
- Label: United Artists
- Producer: Ike Turner, Gerhard Augustin

Ike Turner chronology
| A Black Man's Soul (1969) | Blues Roots (1972) | Bad Dreams (1973) |

Singles from Blues Roots
- 1. "Right On" Released: April 1972; 2. "Lawdy Miss Clawdy" Released: July 1972

Blues Roots is a studio album by musician Ike Turner, released on United Artists Records in June 1972.

== Recording and release ==
Blues Roots was a side project recorded in 1971 and 1972 at Turner's studio, Bolic Sound, in Inglewood, California. Two singles were released, "Right On" and a cover of Lloyd Price's "Lawdy Miss Clawdy."

== Critical reception ==
Professional ratings
Review scores
| Source | Rating |
|---|---|
| AllMusic | 4/5 stars |

The album received positive reviews. Gene Sculatti wrote for The Sacramento Bee that "Ike's approach to singing provides refreshing counterbalance. He added, "where Tina's fiery attack suggests a long-caged lioness suddenly freed, Ike's style rests on understatement."

Billboard (June 10, 1972):

The strength of Ike's style does lie in his "Blues Roots." Producing himself on this package of blues images, including some material of blues great Willie Dixon and other masters, Ike proves his ability as a writer and artist of the blues as well as his development as a singIe performer. No horns, no Ikettes, no frills – just clean, pure blues from the roots.

== Reissues ==
Blues Roots was reissued by BGO Records in 2012 on the compilation CD Blues Roots/Bad Dreams.

== Track listing ==
Side A
| No. | Title | Writer(s) | Length |
|---|---|---|---|
| 1. | "You're Still My Baby" | Chuck Willis | 2:58 |
| 2. | "Tacks in My Shoes" | Ike Turner | 2:58 |
| 3. | "The Things I Used to Do (I Don't Do No More)" | Eddie Jones | 2:57 |
| 4. | "Goin' Home" | L. Jennings, J. L. Lattaker | 3:01 |
| 5. | "Lawdy Miss Clawdy" | Lloyd Price | 1:37 |
| 6. | "Right On" | Ike Turner | 4:45 |

Side B
| No. | Title | Writer(s) | Length |
|---|---|---|---|
| 1. | "Think" | Ike Turner | 2:59 |
| 2. | "Rockin' Blues" | Booker Lee | 2:48 |
| 3. | "That's Alright" | | 2:59 |
| 4. | "My Babe" | Willie Dixon | 3:22 |
| 5. | "Broken Hearted" | Jean Tucker | 3:29 |
| 6. | "If You Love Me Like You Say" | Ike Turner | 3:02 |

== Personnel ==
- Ike Turner - vocals, guitar, arrangements

Technical

- Barry Keene, John Mills, Jim Saunders, Steve Waldman - engineer
- Mike Salisbury - design
- Norman Seeff - art direction, photography
