= Bolic Sound =

Former recording studio in Inglewood, California, USA

Bolic Sound Studios
- Industry: Recording studio
- Founded: 1970
- Founder: Ike Turner
- Defunct: January 1981
- Fate: Destroyed by arson
- Headquarters: 1310 N La Brea Avenue, Inglewood, California, U.S.
- Key people: Ike & Tina Turner; The Ikettes; Family Vibes
- Brands: I & TT Productions; Placid Music; HUH Music; Spud Nik Booking Agency
- Services: Recording; Mixing; Engineering; Production; Booking
- Owner: Ike Turner; Tina Turner

Bolic Sound Studios was a recording studio complex in Inglewood, California. It was built by musician Ike Turner in 1970, and remained in operation until it burned down in 1981.

== History ==
As a young bandleader, Ike Turner had grown skeptical of the music industry beginning when he wasn't credited for "Rocket 88," which is considered by many to be the first rock and roll record. While still in his teens he became a talent scout and session musician for the Bihari brothers at Modern Records. Turner, unaware of songwriter's royalties, also wrote new material which the Bihari brothers paid him to copyright under their own name.

Following the success of Ike & Tina Turner, Turner had the finances to create his own recording studio which he called Bolic Sound. The name Bolic derived from the maiden name of his then wife Tina Turner (née Bullock). The studio was previously a furniture store which Turner bought as a shell and had it fully renovated. He also purchased the surrounding properties. The facilities began being used for Turner productions in 1970 before officially opening for business in February 1972.

Turner wanted to utilize his knowledge of the "music industry systems," so he set up the studio to help musicians. "Entertainers get all of the fame and end up with nothing – the manager got all the money," he said. Little Richard, who wrote the introduction to Turner's autobiography Takin' Back My Name (1999), said: "Bolic, was one of the greatest studios I've ever seen. He had everything in this studio. He had his own booking agency, and he was showing people how to produce."

Billboard magazine described Bolic Sound as "one of the most ornate recording plants in the world." Turner had two 16-track quadraphonic sound studios built, a large one to rent out and a smaller one for his personal use. He fitted them out with state-of-the-art equipment which included two 24-input and 16-output mixing consoles custom built by John Stephens and Daniel Flickinger, multi-track 16-track and 24-track recording machines by 3M Corporation and John Stephens, IBM mix memorizers, JBL studio monitor speakers, vintage German-made Neumann, AKG and Sony studio microphones, and an Eventide digital delay. The lushly decorated facilities included a writer's room, Turner's own office, business offices for his staff, a playroom furnished with a pool table, a Steinway Grand Piano; a Hammond B-3 organ with a Leslie speaker and a Fender Rhodes Electric Piano all available in Studio A; restrooms and a Technical Maintenance Room at the end of the studio hallway, a closed-circuit TV security system with an intercom, a large Rehearsal Room with a private entrance that featured a floor-to-ceiling mirrored wall, storage space for band equipment and a private luxury apartment suite. It also housed Ike & Tina Turner's other companies: I & TT Productions, Placid Music, HUH Music, and the Spud Nik Booking Agency.

Artists who recorded at Bolic Sound include Paul McCartney, George Harrison, Duane Allman, Little Richard, and Gayle McCormick. Frank Zappa recorded most of his Over-Nite Sensation and Apostrophe (') albums there in 1973 and 1974. Ike & Tina Turner's hit single "Nutbush City Limits" was also recorded at Bolic Sound in 1973.

In 1973, United Artists Records sponsored their first college seminar, it was held at Bolic Sound. Ike & Tina Turner performed at the event.

In 1974, police raided Bolic Sound. Turner and three associates were arrested for allegedly using an illegal blue box to avoid paying for long-distance telephone calls. He was cleared of the charges.

The debut single from Shalamar, "Uptown Festival," was recorded by session musicians at Bolic Sound in 1976.

Turner was in financial disarray after his divorce from Tina in 1978. As a part of their settlement, she gave him her share of the studio. He tried to sell Bolic Sound, but the temporarily uninsured building was destroyed by arson in January 1981.

== List of artists recorded ==
Many artists outside of the Turner organization recorded at Bolic Sound, including:

- Chris Darrow
- Delaney & Bonnie
- Flo & Eddie
- The Gap Band
- The Rolling Stones
- Three Dog Night
- The Turtles
- Duane Allman
- Judy Cheeks
- Natalie Cole
- J. A. Deane
- George Harrison
- Leon Haywood
- Chaka Khan
- Paul McCartney
- Gayle McCormick
- Billy Preston
- Little Richard
- Pete Sears
- Tim Weisberg
- Bobby Womack
- Frank Zappa
- Shalamar

== List of albums recorded ==
The following albums were recorded and or mixed at Bolic Sound:

- Workin' Together (1970) — Ike & Tina Turner
- 'Nuff Said (1971) — Ike & Tina Turner
- Flesh & Blood (1972) — Gayle McCormick
- La Croix (1972) — La Croix
- Feel Good (1972) — Ike & Tina Turner
- Strange Fruit (1972) — Family Vibes
- Blues Roots (1972) — Ike Turner
- The Phlorescent Leech & Eddie (1972) — Flo & Eddie
- Let Me Touch Your Mind (1972) — Ike & Tina Turner
- Confined To Soul (1973) — Family Vibes
- Judy Cheeks (1973) — Judy Cheeks
- Over-Nite Sensation (1973) — Frank Zappa and the Mothers of Invention
- Bad Dreams (1973) — Ike Turner
- Nutbush City Limits (1973) — Ike & Tina Turner
- Tina Turns the Country On! (1974) — Tina Turner
- (G)Old & New (1974) — The Ikettes
- The Gospel According To Ike & Tina (1974)
- Sweet Rhode Island Red (1974) — Ike & Tina Turner
- Tim Weisberg 4 (1974) — Tim Weisberg
- Apostrophe (') (1974) — Frank Zappa
- Roxy & Elsewhere — Frank Zappa
- Acid Queen (1975) — Tina Turner
- Country Boy, City Man (1975) — Mr. Cix
- Do You Hear Me Talking To You? (1976) — People's Pleasure with Alive and Well
- Love Brought Me Back (1978) — D. J. Rogers
- Gardens, Not Battlefields (1981) — Harrison Johnson and The Los Angeles Community Choir
