= Beyond (Swiss band) =

Swiss spiritual music group of women of different age stages and religious backgrounds

- Origin: Switzerland
- Genres: Spiritual, Chill, Ambient, World
- Years active: 2007–present
- Labels: Universal; Decca; iGroove
- Members: Regula Curti; Sawani Shende-Sathaye; Ani Choying; Dima Orsho; Mor Karbasi
- Past members: Dechen Shak-Dagsay; Tina Turner
- Website: Official Website

Beyond is a Swiss spiritual music group of women of different age stages and religious backgrounds founded in 2007 by Swiss singer Regula Curti and her neighbours Tina Turner and Dechen Shak-Dagsay.

== Band history ==
=== 2007–2010: Formation and Buddhist and Christian Prayers ===
Already a former mainstream success artist, Tina Turner has been living in a lake house, Château Algonquin in Küsnacht, next to Zürich, since moving there in 1994. There she lived with her neighbours Regula Curti, who wanted to recruit a new music project in 2007 along with Dechen Shak-Dagsay. All three women live religious backgrounds with Curti being Christ from Zürich, Switzerland, Shak-Dagsay, a Buddhist originally from Tibet and Turner, a Buddhist-Baptist, how she calls herself, from Nutbush, Tennessee. In 2009, they released their first album Buddhist And Christian Prayers. This album, produced by Gunther Mende and Mee Eun Kim-Mende, combined Buddhist chants and Christian choral music along with a spiritual message read by Turner. The album was released only in Germany and a handful of other countries. It peaked at number 7 in Switzerland.

=== 2011–2013: Children – With Children United in Prayer ===
In 2011, the group released their second album Children - With Children United in Prayer with a children choir and charted again in Switzerland. Turner promoted the album by performing on TV shows in Germany and Switzerland in December that year. In May 2012, Turner was spotted attending a fashion show in Beijing to support Giorgio Armani. Turner appeared on the cover of the German issue of Vogue magazine in April 2013, becoming at the age of 73 the oldest person worldwide to feature on the cover of Vogue.

=== 2014–2016: Addition of Shende-Sathaye and Love Within ===
In 2014, the trio has been added with a fourth member Sawani Shende-Sathaye from Pune, India, of Hinduism background, to a quartet. Together they released the third album Love Within with Turner contributing some gospel tracks. The album, which combines genres of the group's previous albums with classical Hindu music and mantras due to the addition of Shende-Sathaye, is also their first album to get a worldwide release.

=== 2017–present: Awakening and line-up change ===
On November 10, 2017, Beyond released their fourth studio album Awakening, produced by syrian-american Kareem Roustom. This album also saw major line-up changes with the leaving member Dagsay and the addition of the three singers Ani Choying from Kathmandu, Nepal, Dima Orsho from Damascus, Syria and Mor Karbasi from Jerusalem, Israel. Unlike the previous releases, each song is sung by solely one of the six artists along a choir. The content of prayers and lyrical texts has been extended with lullabies. The album has been recorded with the Philharmonia Orchestra London in the Abbey Road Studio.

== Artistry ==
=== Music and public image ===
Beyond's music is a mix of religious spiritual, chill, ambient and world music. All four women live religious backgrounds with Curti being Christ from Switzerland, Shak-Dagsay, a Buddhist originally from Tibet, Turner, a Buddhist-Baptist, how she calls herself, from Nutbush, Tennessee and Shende-Sathaye, of Hinduism background. While the second album adds a children choir, the third album had been added with classical Hindu music and mantras due to the addition of the fourth member Shende-Sathaye in back in 2014. The fourth album features mostly orchestral elements due to the Philharmonia Orchestra London. Even though being a music group project, every individual member has been credited separately on the front covers and each members contribution on the back covers, especially those spiritual messages by Turner.

== Members ==
- Regula Curti (2007–present)
- Sawani Shende-Sathaye (2014–present)
- Ani Choying (2017–present)
- Dima Orsho (2017–present)
- Mor Karbasi (2017–present)

=== Past members ===
- Tina Turner (2007-2020)
- Dechen Shak-Dagsay (2007–2017)

== Discography ==
- Buddhist and Christian Prayers (2009)
- Children – With Children United in Prayer (2011)
- Love Within (2014)
- Awakening (2017)
