= List of awards and nominations received by Tina Turner =

Tina Turner awards and nominations
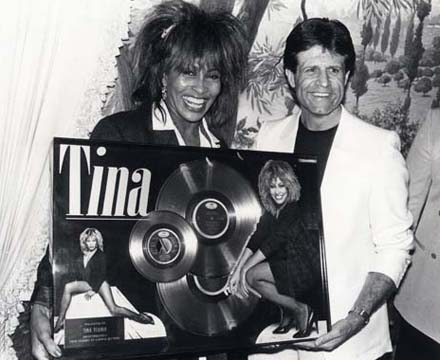
- Turner holding certification plaques
Awards and nominations
Award	Wins	Nominations
American Music Awards	3	8
Billboard	7	7
Grammy	8	25
Grammy Hall of Fame	3	3
Grammy Special awards	1	1
Tony Awards	0	1

Totals (Note: Certain award groups do not simply award one winner. They acknowledge several different recipients, have runners-up, and have third place. Since this is a specific recognition and is different from losing an award, runner-up mentions are considered wins in this award tally. For simplification and to avoid errors, each award in this list has been presumed to have had a prior nomination.)
- Wins: 160+
- Nominations: 180+

American-born Swiss singer Tina Turner was nominated for, and won, numerous worldwide awards and accolades.

== American Music Awards ==
Created by Dick Clark in 1973, the American Music Awards is an annual music awards ceremony and one of several major annual American music awards shows. Turner won 3 AMAs from eight nominations.

Year	Nominee / work	Award	Result
1985	Herself	Favorite Soul/R&B Female Artist	Won
1985	Herself	Favorite Soul/R&B Female Video Artist	Won
1985	Herself	Favorite Pop/Rock Female Video Artist	Nominated
1985	Herself	Favorite Soul/R&B Single for "What's Love Got To Do With It"	Nominated
1985	Herself	Favorite Pop/Rock Single for "What's Love Got To Do With It"	Nominated
1986	Herself	Favorite Pop/Rock Female Artist	Won
1987	Herself	Favorite Pop/Rock Female Video Artist	Nominated
1987	Herself	Favorite Soul/R&B Female Video Artist	Nominated

== Billboard Number-One Awards ==
Year	Nominee / work	Award	Result
1984	Herself	Comeback of the Year	Won
1984	Herself	Top Black Singles Artists - Female	Won
1984	Herself	Top Black Artists - Female	Won
1985	Herself	Top Black Album Artists - Female	Won

== Cyprus Music Awards ==
Tina Turner won one Cyprus Music Award from 2 nominations.

Year	Nominee / work	Award	Result
2011	Herself	Best Artists from the Oldies	Won
2012	Herself	Best Artists from the Oldies	Nominated

== Essence Awards ==
Ann-Margret presented the Essence Award to Turner on stage.

Year	Nominated work	Award	Result
1993	Tina Turner	Living Legend Award	Honoree

== Grammy Awards ==
The Grammy Awards are awarded annually by the National Academy of Recording Arts and Sciences of the United States. Turner has won 8 Grammys from 25 nominations. She has also received 3 Grammy Hall of Fame Awards and a Grammy Lifetime Achievement Award, giving her a total of 12 Grammys.

Year	Nominee / work	Award	Result
1962	It's Gonna Work Out Fine	Best Rock & Roll Recording	Nominated
1970	The Hunter	Best Female R&B Vocal Performance	Nominated
1972	Proud Mary (Shared with Ike Turner)	Best R&B Performance by a Duo or Group with Vocal	Won
1975	Tina Turns the Country On!	Best Female R&B Vocal Performance	Nominated
1975	The Gospel According To Ike And Tina	Best Soul Gospel Performance	Nominated
1985	Private Dancer	Album of the Year	Nominated
1985	What's Love Got to Do with It	Record of the Year	Won
1985	What's Love Got to Do with It	Best Female Pop Vocal Performance	Won
1985	Better Be Good to Me	Best Female Rock Vocal Performance	Won
1985	Let's Stay Together	Best Female R&B Vocal Performance	Nominated
1986	Private Dancer	Best Short Form Music Video	Nominated
1986	One of the Living	Best Female Rock Vocal Performance	Won
1986	We Don't Need Another Hero	Best Female Pop Vocal Performance	Nominated
1986	It's Only Love	Best Rock Performance by a Duo or Group with Vocal.	Nominated
1986	Tina Live	Best Long Form Music Video	Nominated
1987	Back Where You Started	Best Female Rock Vocal Performance	Won
1987	Typical Male	Best Female Pop Vocal Performance	Nominated
1988	Better Be Good To Me live	Best Rock Vocal Performance, Solo	Nominated
1989	Tina Live in Europe	Best Female Rock Vocal Performance	Won
1990	Foreign Affair	Best Female Rock Vocal Performance	Nominated
1991	Steamy Windows	Best Female Rock Vocal Performance	Nominated
1993	The Bitch Is Back	Best Female Rock Vocal Performance	Nominated
1994	I Don't Wanna Fight	Best Female Pop Vocal Performance	Nominated
1998	Live in Amsterdam: Wildest Dreams Tour	Best Long Form Music Video	Nominated
2008	River: The Joni Letters (Shared with Various Artists)	Album of the Year	Won

Note: "What's Love Got to Do with It also won the Grammy for "Song of the Year". This award was presented to songwriters Terry Britten and Graham Lyle.
Note: Tina is also represented in the Grammy Hall of Fame with three of her singles inducted: "River Deep - Mountain High" (1999); "Proud Mary" (2003); and "What's Love Got To Do With It" (2012).

== Grammy Hall of Fame ==
Year	Award	Result	Ref.
2012	"What's Love Got To Do With It"	Inducted	
2003	"Proud Mary"	Inducted	
1999	"River Deep - Mountain High"	Inducted	

== Grammy Lifetime Achievement Award ==
Year	Award	Result	Ref.
2018	Lifetime Achievement Award	Honoree	

== Guinness Book of World Records ==
In January 1988 Turner set a Guinness World Record "for the largest paying rock concert attendance for a solo artist" by performing in front of approximately 180,000 people at Maracanã Stadium in Rio de Janeiro, Brazil, which remained until 1997. Some sources claim that she's also listed in the Guinness Book of Records for selling more concert tickets than any solo performer in history.

Years held	Event	Record	Number	Ref
1988-1997	Break Every Rule World Tour concert in Rio de Janeiro	Largest paying rock concert attendance for a solo artist	180,000	

== Guinness Book of British Hit Singles & Albums ==
British Hit Singles & Albums (originally known as The Guinness Book of British Hit Singles and The Guinness Book of British Hit Albums) is a music reference book originally published in the United Kingdom by the publishing arm of Guinness, Guinness Superlatives. Turner has been featured three times.

Year	Nominee / work	Award	Result	Ref.
2002	Turner	Top 100 Artists of All Time – #67	Won	
2005	Turner	Top 100 Most Successful Acts Of All Time in The Book Of British Hit Singles & Albums.#34	Won	
2010	Turner	the first recording artist in UK chart history to score top 40 hits in the 1960s, 1970s, 1980s, 1990s, 2000s and 2010s.	Won	
2020	Turner	the first recording artist in UK chart history to score top 40 hits in the 1960s, 1970s, 1980s, 1990s, 2000s, 2010s and 2020s.	Won	

== Hollywood Walk of Fame ==
Year	Nominee / work	Award	Result
1986	Herself	Recipient	Inducted

== IFPI Platinum Europe Awards ==
The IFPI Platinum Europe Awards were founded in 1996 and are awarded in recognition of one million album retail sales across Europe. Turner has received 3 awards.

Year	Nominee / work	Award	Result
1997	Wildest Dreams (2x)	Platinum Europe Award	Won
1999	Twenty Four Seven (1x)	Platinum Europe Award	Won
2004	All the Best (1x)	Platinum Europe Award	Won

== Kennedy Center Honors ==
Year	Nominee / work	Award	Result
2005	Herself	Award	Honoree

== Live Design ==
The concerts received additional accolades, receiving an "Excellence Award" from Live Design Magazine.

Year	Nominee / work	Award	Result
2009	Tina!: 50th Anniversary Tour	Excellence Award	Won

== MTV Video Music Awards ==
he MTV Video Music Awards were established in 1984 by MTV to celebrate the top music videos of the year. Turner won two VMAs out of five nominations.

Year	Nominee / work	Award	Result
1985	"What's Love Got to Do with It"	Best Female Video	Won
1985	"Better Be Good to Me"	Best Stage Performance in a Video	Nominated
1985	"Private Dancer"	Best Choreography	Nominated
1986	"It's Only Love" (with Bryan Adams)	Best Stage Performance in a Video	Won
1986	"We Don't Need Another Hero"	Best Female Video	Nominated

== NAACP Image Awards ==
These are the awards Tina Turner only won. The awards she didn't are not included.

Year	Nominee / work	Award	Result
1986	Herself	Outstanding Female Actress	Won
1998	Herself	Outstanding Performance in a Variety Series/Special	Nominated

== National Rhythm and Blues Hall of Fame ==
Year	Nominee / work	Award	Result
2025	Herself	Recipient	Inducted

== Pollstar Awards ==
The Pollstar Concert Industry Awards aim to reward the best in the business of shows and concerts. Turner has received 5 awards.

Year	Nominee / work	Award	Result	Ref.
1984	1984 World Tour	Best National Tour Package	Won	
1984	1984 World Tour	Comeback of the Year	Won	
1985	Private Dancer Tour	Most Creative Tour Package	Won	
1985	Private Dancer Tour	Comeback Tour Of The Year	Won	
1985	Private Dancer Tour	Most Creative Stage Set	Nominated	
2000	Twenty Four Seven Tour	Road Warrior of the Year	Won	
2000	Twenty Four Seven Tour	Major Tour of the Year	Nominated	

== Rock & Roll Hall of Fame ==
Year	Nominee / work	Award	Result
1987	Herself	Nominee	Nominated
1991	Herself*	Recipient	Inducted
2021	Herself	Recipient	Inducted

- Inducted to the Hall alongside former husband Ike Turner in 1991.

== Tony Awards ==
The Tony Award recognizes excellence in live Broadway theatre. Tina Turner has received one nomination.

Year	Nominee / work	Award	Result
2020	Tina: The Tina Turner Musical	Best Musical	Nominated

== World Music Awards ==
Tina Turner won a special award for Lifelong Contribution to the Music Industry, also known as Legend Award, at the World Music Awards.

Year	Nominee / work	Award	Result	Ref.
1993	Herself	Legend Award	Won	

== Tennessee Association of Museum Awards ==
Tina Turner Museum received 9 awards at the Tennessee Association of Museums Conference, the Discovery Park of America in Union City.

Year	Nominee / work	Award	Result
2015	Herself	Past President's Award	Won
2015	Herself	Special Recognition Tina Turner	Won
2015	Herself	Permanent Exhibition Tina Turner Museum at Flagg Grove School	Won
2015	Herself	Special Event "Grand Opening of Tina Turner Museum at Flagg Grove School	Won
2015	Herself	Volunteerism Sandra and Fred Silverstein	Won
2015	Herself	Special Recognition Ann and Pat Mann	Won
2015	Herself	Publication: Book/Catalog Life Perspectives 7 Award Winning West TN Artists	Won
2015	Herself	Superlative Achievement for Publications: PR Kit PLA Media-Tina Turner Museum at Flagg Grove School	Won
2015	Herself	Publications: Flat Paper The Art of Farming brochure	Won

== Record World Awards ==
Record World magazine (1946–1982) was one of the three main music industry trade magazines in the United States, along with Billboard and Cash Box magazines, The Record World Awards were an annual award given to most successful artists in the US.

Year	Nominee / work	Award	Result	Ref.
1969	Ike & Tina Turner	Top Promising Duo Albums Of The Year	Won	
1971	Ike & Tina Turner	Top Duo (Albums)	2nd place	
1971	Ike & Tina Turner	Top Duo (Singles)	2nd place	
1972	Ike & Tina Turner	Top Duo R&B Award	2nd place	
1973	Ike & Tina Turner	Top Duo R&B Of The Year	Won	
1974	Ike & Tina Turner	Top Duo Of The Year (Album)	Won	
1974	Ike & Tina Turner	Top Vocal Duo Of The Year (Singles)	Won	

== Record Mirror R&B Poll ==
R&B POLL RESULTS – Week ending April 25, 1964

Year	Nominee / work	Award	Result	Ref.
1964	Tina Turner	TOP FEMALE SINGER	6th place	

=== Record World DJ Awards ===
Year	Nominee / work	Award	Result	Ref.
1971	Ike & Tina Turner	TOP Duo Of The Year (singles)	Won	

== Roper Poll ==
Year	Nominee / work	Award	Result	Ref.
1985	Tina Turner	America's Heroes and Heroines of the Year	Won	
1999	Tina Turner	the most admired women of the 20th Century	Nominated	

== Rolling Stone Critics Poll Music Awards ==
Year	Nominee / work	Award	Result	Ref.
1984	Private Dancer - Tina Turner	Albums Of The Year	3rd place	

== U.S. Television Viewers Awards ==
Year	Nominee	Work	Award	Result	Ref
1986	"Tina Turner"	What's Love Got To Do With It	America's Most Favorite Song (1975-1985)	Won	

== Other awards ==
AARP Awards

Year	Nominee/Work	Award	Result	Ref
1999	"Tina Turner"	The Sexiest Stars Award	Won	

=== Austin Music Awards ===
Year	Nominee / work	Award	Result	Ref.
1985-1986	Tina Turner	Best Concert By a Touring Artist	Won	
1987-1988	Tina Turner	Best Concert By a Touring Artist	Nominated	
2000-2001	Tina Turner	Best Roadshow of the Year	Won	
2000-2001	Tina Turner	Best Concert By a Touring Artist	Nominated	

=== Bravo Otto award ===
A German accolade honoring excellence of performers in film, television and music. Presented annually since 1957, winners are selected by the readers of Bravo magazine. The award is presented in Gold, Silver and Bronze.

Year	Nominee / work	Award	Result	Ref.
1984	Herself	Favorite Female Singer of the Year - (Bronze Award)	Won	
1985	Herself	Favorite Female Singer of the Year - (Bronze Award)	Won	

=== French Jazz Academy Soul Awards ===
Jazz music has been popular in France since the 1920s. Its international popularity peaked in the 1930s, and it has been continually enjoyed since. Ike and Tina Turner received the French Jazz Academy Soul award during their late January visit to Paris.

Year	Nominee / work	Award	Result	Ref.
1971	"Ike and Tina Turner"	Top Duo of the Year	Won	

=== MOBO Awards ===
The MOBO Awards (an acronym for "Music of Black Origin") were established in 1996 by Kanya King. They are held annually in the United Kingdom to recognize artists of any race or nationality performing music of black origin. Turner has received Mobo Awards from Lionel Richie

Year	Nominee / work	Award	Result
1999	Herself	Lifetime Achievement Award	Honoree

=== The CASH BOX Year-End Charts ===
Cash Box magazine awards was a weekly publication devoted to the music and coin-operated machine industries which was published from July 1942 to November 16, 1996. It was one of several magazines that published charts of song popularity in the United States. Turner, both solo and with Ike, has been listed on the award lists 12 times.

Year	Nominee / work	Award	Result	Ref.
1960	"A Fool in Love" - Ike & Tina Turner	Top 50 R&B singles–	22nd place	
1961	It's Gonna Work Out Fine - Ike & Tina Turner	Top 50 R&B singles–	5th place	
1961	I IDOLIZE YOU – Ike & Tina Turner	Top 50 R&B singles–	48th place	
1962	POOR FOOL – Ike & Tina Turner	Top 50 R&B singles–	17th place	
1971	PROUD MARY – Ike & Tina Turner	TOP 100 POP SINGLES –	56th place	
1984	WHAT’S LOVE GOT TO DO WITH IT Tina Turner	TOP 100 POP SINGLES –	2nd place	
1984	BETTER BE GOOD TO ME – Tina Turner	TOP 100 POP SINGLES –	63rd place	
1984	PRIVATE DANCER – Tina Turner	TOP 100 POP ALBUMS –	10th place	
1985	WE DON’T NEED ANOTHER HERO (Thunderdome) – Tina Turner	TOP 100 POP SINGLES –	20th place	
1986	TYPICAL MALE – Tina Turner	TOP 100 POP SINGLES –	33rd place	
1986	BREAK EVERY RULE – Tina Turner	TOP 50 POP ALBUMS –	49th place	
1993	I DON’T WANNA FIGHT – Tina Turner	TOP 50 POP SINGLES –	43rd place	

=== Music & Media year-end awards ===
Music & Media year-end awards were based on statistics from the Eurochart Hot 100 Singles and European Top 100 Albums. The awards were handed to most successful artists in Europe. Turner has received 6 awards

Year	Nominee / work	Award	Result	Ref.
1985	Tina Turner	Top Female Artist (Albums)	Won	
1985	Tina Turner	Top Female Artist (Singles)	Won	
1985	Tina Turner	Top 10 Artists (Albums) -	6th place	
1985	Tina Turner	Top 10 Artists (Singles)-	8th place	
1985	Tina Turner	Female Artist of the year -	Won	
1986	Tina Turner	Top 10 Female Artists (Albums)	Won	
1986	Tina Turner	Top 10 Female Artists (Singles)	Won	
1986	Tina Turner	Euro clips of the year (Singles) -	12th place	
1989	Tina Turner	Top 10 Female Artists (Albums)	Won	
1989	Tina Turner	Top 10 Female Artists (Singles)-	7th place	
1989	Tina Turner	Euro clips of the year (Singles) -	19th place	
1993	Tina Turner	Top Female Artists (Albums)-	3rd place	
1996	Tina Turner	Top Female Artists (Singles)-	2nd place	

=== Billboard's Year-End R&B Chart ===
Top R&B Hits of 1950–1969 From wsuonline (based on Year End R&B Chart summaries – probably The Billboard year-end issues) Turner with Ike, has been on the lists 2 times.

Year	Nominee / work	Award	Result	Ref.
1960	"A Fool in Love" - Ike & Tina Turner	Top 5 R&B singles–	3rd place	
1961	It's Gonna Work Out Fine - Ike & Tina Turner	Top 5 R&B singles–	2nd place	

=== Chicago Tribune ===
Year	Nominee / work	Award	Result	Ref.
1984	Tina Turner	R&B Performer of the Year	Won	
1984	Tina Turner	Rhythm and blues/soul artist honors	Won	

=== Ebony Readers Poll ===
Year	Nominee / work	Award	Result	Ref.
1985	Tina Turner	The Honorees	Won	
1990	Tina Turner	The most Exciting Black Woman	Won	
1992	Tina Turner	The woman most male readers would like to spend an evening with	Won	
1994	Tina Turner and Ike	The best recent movie starring Blacks	Won	

=== BMI Awards ===
The BMI Awards are annual award ceremonies for songwriters in various genres organized by Broadcast Music, Inc., honoring songwriters and publishers. The main pop music award was founded in 1952.

Year	Nominee / work	Award	Result
1994	I Don't Wanna Fight	The Most Performed Songs of the Year	Won
2008	What's Love Got to do with it	Multi-Million Performance	Won

=== The CLASSICS Act ===
The CLASSICS Act has been introduced by both chambers of Congress and petition urging lawmakers to see it through. The bill, which stands for Compensating Legacy Artists for their Songs, Service, & Important Contributions to Society Act—would close that loophole and require a uniform digital royalty rate for all music makes billions of dollars a year from airplay of music made before February 15, 1972. The letter, first introduced in December, was initially signed by more than 40 artists, including Tina Turner.

Year	Nominee / work	Award	Result
2018	Herself	Legacy Artists	Inducted

=== NARM Music Awards ===
the National Association Of Record Merchandisers Gift Of Music Awards, now known as the Music Business Association

Year	Nominee	Work	Award	Result	Ref
1985	"Tina Turner"	Private Dancer	Best Selling Album by a female artist	Nominated	
1985	"Tina Turner"	Private Dancer	Best Selling Black Music Album by a female artist	Won	
1985	"Tina Turner"	Private Dancer	Best Selling Videoca settee as music video	Nominated	

=== Navas Awards ===
Year	Nominee / work	Award	Result	Ref.
1985	Private Dancer-Tina Turner	Best female performance	Won	
1985	What's love got to do with it -Tina Turner	Best female performance	Nominated	

=== Natra Awards ===
Year	Nominee / work	Award	Result	Ref.
1971	Ike & Tina Turner	Best Duo Of The Year	Won	

=== Life Magazine ===
Year	Nominee / work	Award	Result	Ref.
1985	What's love got to do with it? Tina Turner	Song of the Year	Won	

=== Living Blues Awards ===
Year	Nominee / work	Award	Result	Ref.
2014	Ike & Tina Turner (On the Road 1971–72)	Best Blues DVD Of The Year	Won	
2017	Ike & Tina Turner - The Complete Pompeii Recordings 1968-1969 - Goldenlane (Reissue Recordings)	Best Blues Album of the Year	Nominated	

=== IM&MC Music Video Awards ===
The IM&MC Music Video Is Clip Competition Awards will be presented to winners during the telecast. The Marked the closing of the first International Music&Media Conference (IM&MC). The show was carried live by the BBC and The U.K.-based Music Box network, and was tapped for later presentation on MTV in the U.S. and MuchMusic in Canada.

Year	Nominee / work	Award	Result	Ref.
1986	Herself	Best Performance in Private Dancer	Won	

=== International Bachelor's Society ===
Year	Nominee / work	Award	Result	Ref.
1977	"Herself"	The Most Exciting Women of the Year	Won	

=== Grand Parents Sexiest Awards ===
The Sexiest GRANDparents Awards By Grand Magazine in Celebrity GRANDparents, Entertainment

Year	Nominee / work	Award	Result	Ref.
2010	Tina Turner	The Sexiest Grandparents Awards	Won	
2006	Tina Turner	The Sexiest Grandparents Awards	Won	

=== German Awards (Deutsche Phono-Akademie) ===
Year	Nominee / work	Award	Result	Ref.
1985	Private Dancer	Top Pop Album Of The Year	Won	

=== Hit parade ===
Year	Nominee / work	Award	Result	Ref.
1971	Proud Mary - Ike & Tina Turner	TOP Duo Of The Year (singles)	Won	

=== Hanes Hosiery ===
In 1996, Her Hanes campaign was so well received that Turner topped the sexiest legs survey in 1997. In 2011.

Year	Nominee / work	Award	Result	Ref.
1997	Tina Turner	Sexy Legs Survey of the Year	Won	
2011	Tina Turner	Sexy Legs Survey of the Year	Won	

=== Ordre des Arts et des Lettres ===
In 1996 Turner received France's most prestigious arts honor when she was made a Chevalier of the Ordre des Arts et des Lettres. The medal is only awarded to artists who are considered to have made notable contributions towards popular culture in France.

Year	Nominee / work	Award	Result
1996	Herself	Chevalier	Honoree

=== St. Louis Walk of Fame ===
Tina Turner was inducted into the St. Louis Walk of Fame.

Year	Nominee / work	Award	Result
1991	Herself	Induction into the St. Louis Walk of Fame (A star located at 6378 Delmar)	Inducted

=== Oprah Winfrey's Legends Ball ===
Named as one of Oprah Winfrey's 25 Legendary Black Women, 2005

Year	Nominee / work	Award	Result
2005	Herself	25 Legendary Black Women Honor Award	Inducted

=== Cable ACE Award ===
Tina Turner won one CAA from 3 nominations.

Year	Nominee / work	Award	Result
1985	Tina Turner: Private Dancer	Performance in a Music Special	Won
1989	Tina Live from Rio (1988)	Performance in a Music Special	Nominated
1994	Tina Turner: Going Home (1993)	Performance in a Music Special or Series	Nominated

=== SwissAward ===
Tina Turner wins the Swissaward.

Year	Nominee / work	Award	Result
2009	Herself	"Show" category	Won

=== Berolina Awards (Satellite Issue) ===
Turner has received Berolina Awards in 1987

Year	Nominee / work	Award	Result
1987	Herself	The Rock Legend	Won

=== Goldene Kamera ===
Turner has received three awards

Year	Nominee / work	Award	Result
1991	Tina Turner: Simply the Best - The Video Collection	Best Music International	Won
1992	"Way of the world"	Video hit of the year	Won
2005	Herself	Pop International Germany	Won

=== The Change Award ===
for the Beyond Team – Switzerland 2012

Year	Nominee / work	Award	Result
2012	for the Beyond Team	behalf of the entire Beyond Team	Won

=== TARA Award ===
for the Beyond Team – Bangkok – Thailand 2014

Year	Nominee / work	Award	Result
2014	for the Beyond Team	The prestigious international award	Won

=== NRJ Music Awards ===
Turner has received honor awards

Year	Nominee / work	Award	Result
2000	Herself	Honor Award	Honoree

=== Premios Amigo ===
The Premios Amigo is a music award ceremony in Spain, presented annually by Productores de Música de España since 1997.

Year	Nominee / work	Award	Result
1999	Herself	Tribute Award	Honoree

=== The Washington Post ===
Year	Nominee / work	Award	Result	Ref.
2008	Herself	the women most admired	Won	

=== Walk of Fame Europe ===
In 1996, Turner's handprints at the Walk of Fame Europe Rotterdam.

Year	Nominee / work	Award	Result
1996	Herself	handprints	Inducted

=== Dressed Hall of Fame ===
Vanity Fair's International Best Dressed Hall of Fame – Females

Year	Nominee / work	Award	Result
1996	Herself	Best Dressed Hall of Fame - Females	Inducted

=== Women of the Year Award ===
Year	Nominee / work	Award	Result
2005	Herself	Women of the Year Award	Won

== Honors ==
Turner has also received the following honors:

- 1967: Turner was the first black artist and first female on the cover of Rolling Stone magazine (Issue No. 2).
- 1977: She was named the most exciting woman of the year by International Bachelor's Society.
- 1987: Berolina Award honored Turner as the biggest influence in music in Germany.
- 1990: Turner was voted Best International female Singer of the year in Europe by Goldene Europa.
- 1993: World Music Awards presented Turner with the Legend Award.
- 1993: Essence Awards honored Turner with the Living Legend Award.
- 1996: Turner received the accolade of Légion d'Honneur from the French education minister.
- 1997: Hanes honored Turner for having the sexiest legs in the entertainment business.
- 1999: MOBO Awards honored Turner with the Lifetime Achievement Award.
- 1999: Turner was named one of The Sexiest Stars Over 50 by the American Association of Retired Persons.
- 1999: Turner ranked number 2 on VH1's list of 100 Greatest Women of Rock and Roll.
- 2002: Turner ranked number 6 on VH1's 100 Sexiest Artists of All Time.
- 2002: Tennessee State Route 19 between Brownsville and Nutbush was named "Tina Turner Highway".
- 2002: She was voted at number 56 in Q magazine's list of the Top 100 Women Who Rock The World.
- 2003: "What's Love Got to Do with It" was included in VH1's list of the 100 Best Songs of the Past 25 years.
- 2003: Turner was included on VH1's list of the "200 Greatest Pop Culture Icons of All Time".
- 2003: Rolling Stone ranked Proud Mary: The Best of Ike & Tina Turner number 212 on their list of the 500 Greatest Albums of All Time (number 214 on 2012 revised list).
- 2004: People ranked her 1985 performance of "What's Love Got to Do With It" as one of the ten best Grammy moments.
- 2005: Turner was one of 25 African-American women saluted at Oprah Winfrey's Legends Ball, a three-day celebration honoring their contributions to art, entertainment, and civil rights.
- 2006: Turner was voted one of The Sexiest Celebrity Grandparents of the Year by The Grand Magazine.
- 2007: Turner was ranked at number 19 on BET's "Top 25 Dancers of All Time".
- 2008: Rolling Stone ranked Turner number 17 on their list of the 100 Greatest Singers of All Time.
- 2008: Turner was selected as the woman most admired by The Washington Post.
- 2009: Time ranked her 1985 performance of "What's Love Got to Do With It" as one of the Top 10 Grammy moments.
- 2010: Rolling Stone ranked Turner number 63 on their list of the 100 Greatest Artists of All Time.
- 2011: Turner was ranked number 20 on a list of the greatest singers ever by NME.
- 2012: Turner ranked number 34 on VH1's list of the 100 Greatest Artists Of All Time.
- 2012: Turner ranked number 22 on a list of the 100 hottest female singers of all time by complex.com.
- 2013: Turner covered Vogue Germany, becoming the oldest person (aged 73) to cover Vogue magazine (surpassing Meryl Streep, aged 62, who covered the American Vogue in 2012).
- 2013: Turner ranked number 6 on a list of the most loved singers in Switzerland by the Swiss TV channel SRF 1.
- 2013: Turner was ranked number 2 on a list of the 10 biggest musical comebacks of all time by Toronto Sun.
- 2014: Turner was ranked number 2 on a list of The 15 Greatest Legs In The Music Biz by VH1.
- 2014: Turner was inducted into the Soul Music Hall of Fame.
- 2015: Turner was inducted into the Hit Parade Hall of Fame.
- 2015: Turner ranked number 4 on 11 Hair Icons of all time by Hype Hair.
- 2015: The Tina Turner Museum won nine awards at The Tennessee Association of Museums Conference in a ceremony at Discovery Park of America.
- 2015: Turner ranked number 33 on MetroNOW's list of the Top 50 Gay Icons.
- 2015: Rolling Stone ranked Ike & Tina Turner number 2 on their list of the 20 Greatest Duos of All Time.
- 2015: Ike & Tina Turner were inducted into the St. Louis Classic Rock Hall of Fame.
- 2015: Turner was ranked number 29 in Billboard magazine's list of the "35 Greatest R&B Artists of All Time".
- 2016: Turner ranked number 2 on a list of the Top 5 Greatest Voices in the History of Rock Music by ppcorn.com.
- 2016: Turner was ranked number 55 on a list of the 75 Greatest Women of All Time by Esquire.
- 2018: Billboard listed Turner's performance in Mad Max Beyond Thunderdome (1985) film as the 68th best performance of a musician in a box-office film.
- 2018: Turner's Private Dancer album appeared on Rolling Stone's list of the 100 Best Albums of the 1980s and was also included in the book 1001 Albums You Must Hear Before You Die.
- 2018: Billboard ranked Turner at number 37 on their Top 60 Female Artists of All-Time list.
- 2019: Turner was inducted into the Memphis Music Hall of Fame.
- 2020: Turner was ranked as one of the 50 greatest voices of the 80s by MTV.
- 2020: Billboard included Turner on its list of the 100 Greatest Music Video Artists of All Time.
- 2020: Private Dancer was added to the National Recording Registry at the Library of Congress.
- 2021: Turner became a two-time Rock and Roll Hall of Fame inductee.
- 2021: Turner received an honorary doctorate for her "unique musical and artistic life's work" from the Philosophical and Historical Faculty of the University of Bern.
- 2023: Rolling Stone ranked Turner number 55 on their list of the 200 Greatest Singers of All Time.
- 2023: The song "What's Love Got to Do With It" appeared on Billboard's list of the 500 best pop songs of all time.
- 2023–2024: Smooth Radio ranked Turner number 8 on their list of the top music icons of all time.
- 2025: Forbes ranked her number 9 on The 50 Black Female Singers With Incredible Vocals List and number five on their list of the best female singers of the 80s.
- 2025: Turner was selected for induction into the National Rhythm and Blues Hall of Fame.
- 2025: A statue of Turner was unveiled in Brownsville, Tennessee.
