= Mor Karbasi =

Israeli singer-songwriter

Mor Karbasi מור קרבסי
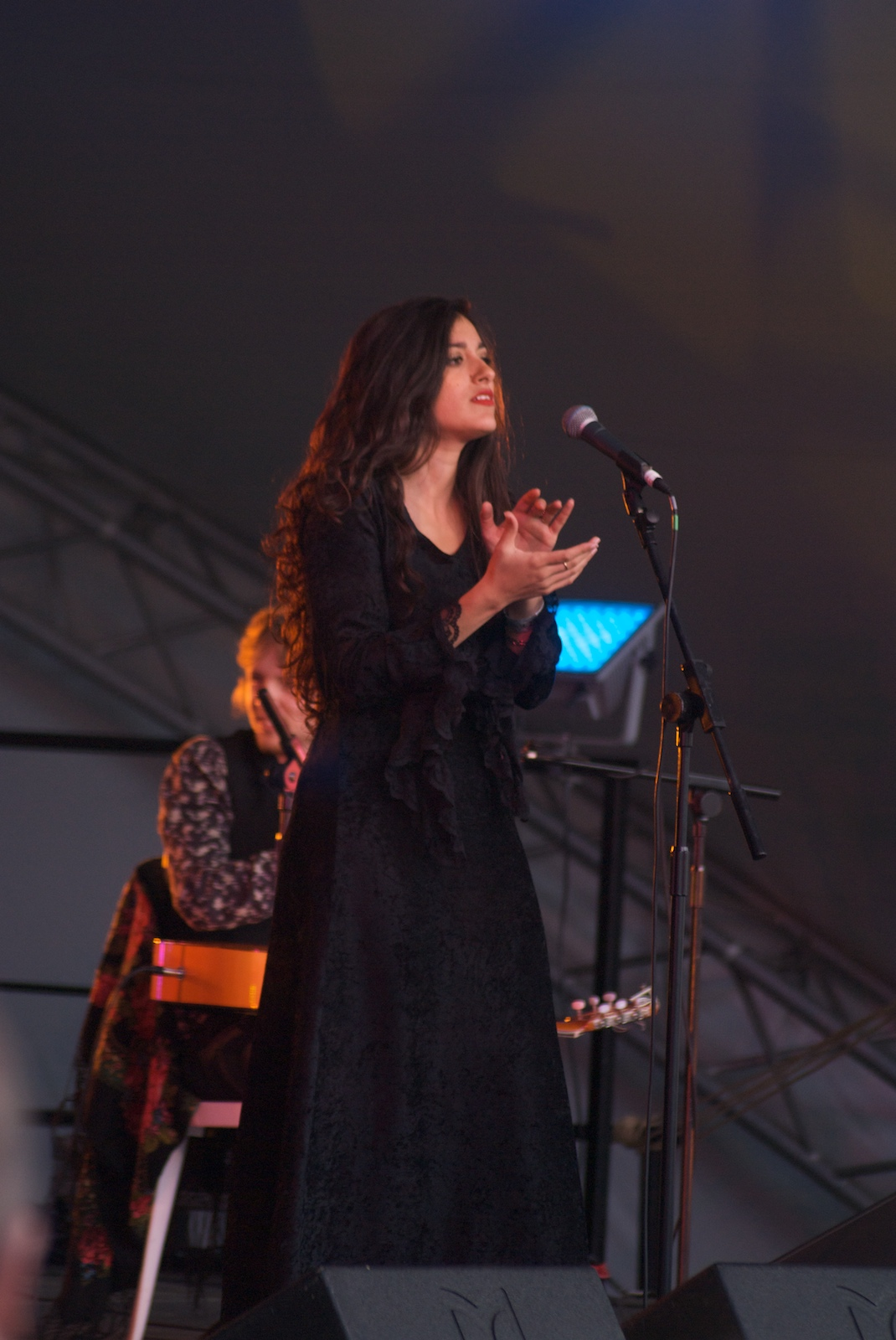

Background information
- Born: Mor Karbasi; April 23, 1986 (age 40)
- Origin: Jerusalem, Israel
- Genres: World music, Sephardic music
- Occupations: Singer, songwriter
- Years active: 2008–present
- Label: Gibralter
- Website: www.morkarbasi.com

Mor Karbasi (Hebrew: מור קרבסי; born April 23, 1986) is an Israeli singer-songwriter born in Jerusalem and now based in Seville after five years in London.

One of her main projects is Ladino music, also known as Judezmo, Spanyolit, or Sephardic—the ancient language and music of the exiled Jews of Portugal and Spain. She writes original material, as well as singing traditional songs. She has been compared to Mariza and Yasmin Levy, but has a strongly individual sound, whichever type of music she sings.

Karbasi's heritage is mixed Iranian (paternal) and Moroccan (maternal), and according to her Moroccan Jewish grandfather, "the blood remembers," meaning that before this her ancestors came from Spain. Her connection to this culture is expressed passionately through her music. Her family name Karbasi means "canvas" in Persian.

== Musical career ==
Karbasi's concert appearances include: Tours of Europe and USA, including appearances on London's Trafalgar Square open air stage (2006 and 2007), festival performances (Womad Festival 2007 Charlton Park, and Las Palmas-Canary Islands, Celtic Connections 2009). TV and Radio broadcasts on National French TV and BBC radio. Her first album, The Beauty and the Sea, was reviewed in The Guardian newspaper. The review called her "one of the great young divas of the global music scene."

She has also made guest appearances with groups having compatible styles, Koby Israelite, Baroque fusion 'Eclipse', Rai band Ludomix, the Pena Flamenco de Israel.

In 2017 Mor joined Swiss-based world music band Beyond, participating in their fourth album Awakening.

== Discography ==
- Earlier work includes a self-produced CD called "Broken Wings", and a four track EP called "Rosa".
- The Beauty and the Sea [2008]
- Daughter of the Spring [2011]
- La Tsadika (The Ballad For Sol) [2013]
- Ojos De Novia (Eyes of a Bride) [2016]

== Traditional influences ==
Mor Karbasi collects and sings songs in Ladino, as well as European and Latin American folk, also Andalucian music sung in Hebrew with Arabic melodies and scales. The latter is called Piyyutim, and is a type of prayer traditionally only sung by men.
