= Tina Turner =

Singer-songwriter and actress (1939–2023)

- Turner in 1986
- Born: Anna Mae Bullock; November 26, 1939; Brownsville, Tennessee, US
- Died: May 24, 2023 (aged 83); Küsnacht, Zurich, Switzerland
- Other name: Martha Nell Turner (Note: In the late 1970s, Turner signed contracts as Martha Nell Bullock, creating questions about her birth name.)
- Citizenship: United States (until 2013); Switzerland (from 2013)
- Occupations: Singer; songwriter; actress; author
- Years active: 1958–2009
- Spouses: Ike Turner (m. 1962; div. 1978); Erwin Bach (m. 2013)
- Children: 4
- Relatives: Alline Bullock (sister); Afida Turner (daughter-in-law); Eugene Bridges (first cousin once removed)
- Musical career
- Origin: St. Louis, Missouri, US
- Genres: Rock and roll; R&B; rock; soul; pop
- Instrument: Vocals
- Works: Full list
- Labels: Sonja; Pompeii; United Artists; Capitol; Parlophone; Virgin
- Formerly of: Ike & Tina Turner
- Awards: Full list
- Website: thetinaturner.com

Tina Turner (born Anna Mae Bullock; November 26, 1939 – May 24, 2023) was a singer, songwriter, actress and author. Dubbed the "Queen of Rock 'n' Roll", she broke both racial and gender barriers in rock music with her vocal prowess and stage presence. She is one of the best-selling music artists of all time, with estimated sales of over 100 million records worldwide.

Turner rose to prominence in the 1960s as the lead vocalist of the R&B husband-wife duo Ike & Tina Turner, known for their explosive live performances with the Ikettes and Kings of Rhythm. After separating from Ike Turner in 1976, she launched a solo career. Following the 1983 hit "Let's Stay Together", she made a comeback with her multi-platinum fifth solo album, Private Dancer (1984). The single "What's Love Got to Do with It" won the Grammy Award for Record of the Year in 1985 and became her only number-one hit on the Billboard Hot 100. She continued her success with the top-ten singles "Better Be Good to Me", "Private Dancer", "We Don't Need Another Hero (Thunderdome)", "Typical Male", and "I Don't Wanna Fight". Later in her career, she sang the theme song for the 1995 James Bond film GoldenEye.

Turner's Break Every Rule World Tour became the highest-grossing tour by a female artist in the 1980s, and her 1988 concert in Rio de Janeiro set a Guinness World Record for the then-largest paying audience in a concert by a solo artist. She continued touring successfully in the 1990s and her Twenty Four Seven Tour was the highest-grossing tour of 2000. In 2009, she retired from performing after completing the Tina!: 50th Anniversary Tour. As an actress, Turner appeared in the films Tommy (1975), Mad Max Beyond Thunderdome (1985), and Last Action Hero (1993). Her life was portrayed in the biopic What's Love Got to Do with It (1993), based on her autobiography I, Tina (1986), and later in the musical Tina (2018) and documentary Tina (2021).

Turner received 12 Grammy Awards, including a Grammy Lifetime Achievement Award and three Grammy Hall of Fame inductions. In 1967, she became the first black artist and the first woman to appear on the cover of Rolling Stone, which later ranked her among the greatest artists and greatest singers of all time. She was awarded a star on the Hollywood Walk of Fame in 1986 and was inducted into the Rock and Roll Hall of Fame twice—first with Ike Turner in 1991 and again as a solo artist in 2021. Turner received the Kennedy Center Honors in 2005. In 2013, Turner relinquished her US citizenship and became a Swiss citizen, residing in Switzerland until her death in Küsnacht in 2023.

== Early life ==
Tina Turner was born Anna Mae Bullock on November 26, 1939, in Brownsville, Tennessee. Her parents were Floyd Bullock and Zelma Currie. Bullock was African American. (Note: Bullock believed she had a significant amount of Native American ancestry until she participated in the PBS series African American Lives 2 with Henry Louis Gates Jr.; Gates shared her genealogical DNA test estimates and traced her family timeline.) Bullock's family lived in the rural unincorporated community of Nutbush, Tennessee, where her father worked as an overseer of the sharecroppers at Poindexter Farm on Highway 180. She later recalled picking cotton with her family at an early age.

Bullock had an older half-sister, Evelyn Juanita Currie, and an older sister, Alline Bullock. She was the first cousin once removed of bluesman Eugene Bridges. As young children, the three sisters were separated when their parents relocated to Knoxville, Tennessee, to work at a defense facility during World War II. Bullock went to stay with her strict, religious paternal grandparents, Alex and Roxanna Bullock, who were deacon and deaconess at the Woodlawn Missionary Baptist Church.

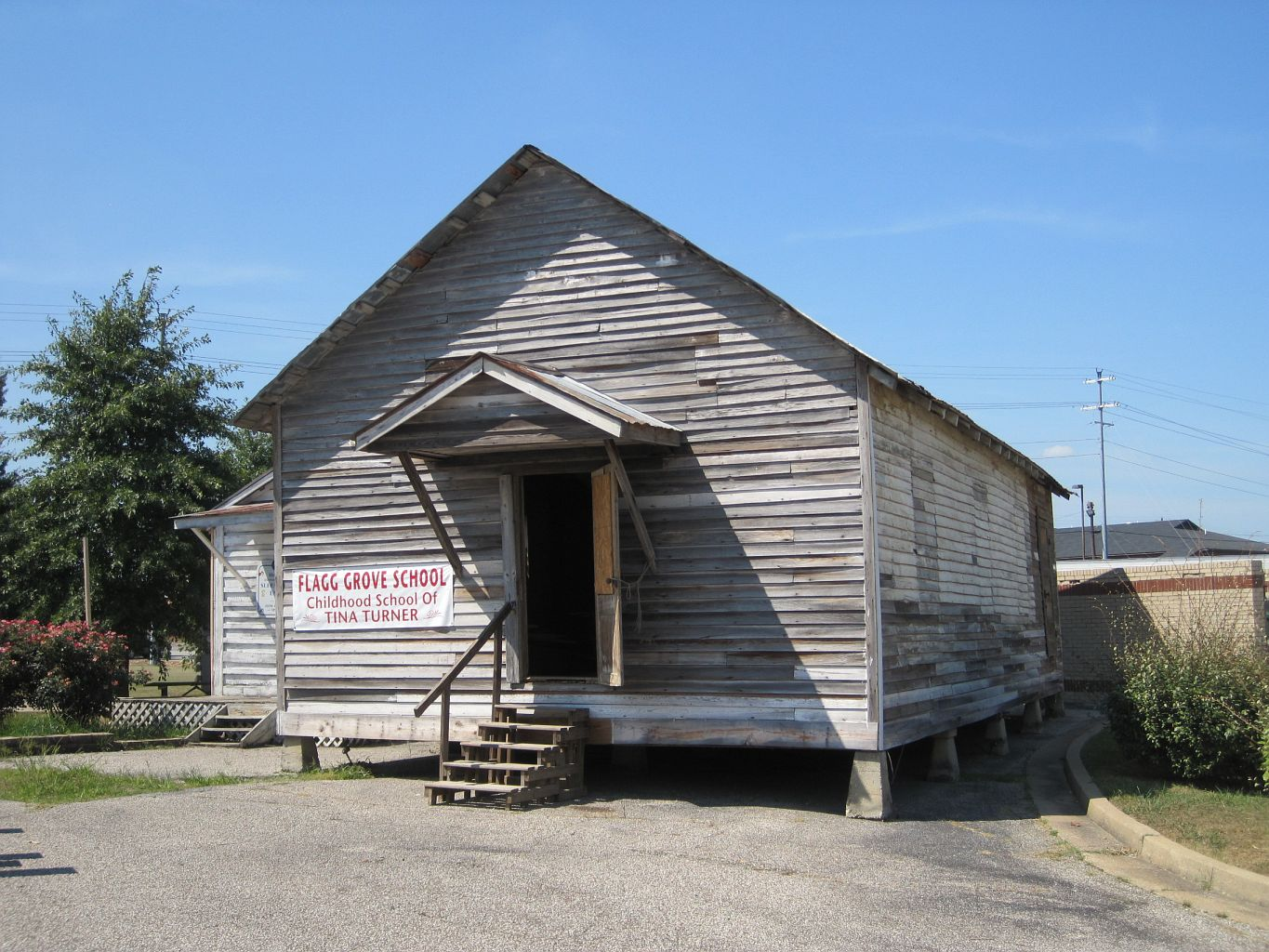
Flagg Grove School in Brownsville, which later became the Tina Turner Museum

After the war, the sisters reunited with their parents and moved with them to Knoxville. Two years later, the family returned to Nutbush to live in the Flagg Grove community, where Bullock attended Flagg Grove School from first through eighth grade. As a young girl, Bullock enjoyed singing and acting. She often performed in the streets for change so she could go to the movies. She sang in the church choir at Nutbush's Spring Hill Baptist Church.

In 1950, when Bullock was 11, her mother Zelma left the family without warning, seeking freedom from her abusive relationship with Floyd by relocating to St. Louis. Two years after her mother left the family, her father married another woman and moved to Detroit. Bullock and her sisters were sent to live with their maternal grandmother, Georgeanna Currie, in Brownsville, Tennessee. She stated in her autobiography I, Tina that she felt her parents did not love her and that she was not wanted. Zelma had planned to leave Floyd, but stayed with him once she became pregnant with Bullock. Bullock recalled, "She was a very young woman who didn't want another kid."

As a teenager, Bullock worked as a domestic worker for the Henderson family in Ripley, Tennessee. She was at the Henderson house when she was notified that her half-sister Evelyn had died in a car crash alongside her cousin Margaret Currie; another cousin, Vela Evans, survived the car crash with injuries. A self-professed tomboy, Bullock joined both the cheerleading squad and the female basketball team at Carver High School in Brownsville, and "socialized every chance she got".

In 1956, following the death of her grandmother, Bullock moved to St. Louis to live with her mother. She graduated from Sumner High School in 1958. After completing her studies, Bullock worked as a nurse's aide at Barnes-Jewish Hospital.

== Career ==
=== Ike & Tina Turner ===
==== Origins: 1956–1959 ====
Bullock's older sister, Alline, frequently attended performances by Ike Turner and his band the Kings of Rhythm in St. Louis and East St. Louis. One Saturday night, Bullock's mother allowed her to accompany Alline to see the group perform at the Club Manhattan in East St. Louis. Bullock was deeply impressed by Turner's talent, later recalling that she "almost went into a trance" watching him play. By the age of 17, she was regularly attending performances by the Kings of Rhythm at Club D'Lisa and Club Manhattan, and her sister Alline began dating drummer Eugene "Gene" Washington. Determined to join the band, Bullock asked Alline to tell Washington to speak to Turner about letting her sing; Turner agreed but never followed through. She later recalled feeling overlooked due to her skinny frame, as Turner was generally attracted to curvier women.

One night, Bullock took the initiative during an intermission, grabbed a microphone, and sang the B.B. King blues ballad "You Know I Love You." Her performance impressed Turner, who invited her to continue singing that night and soon made her a featured vocalist with the group. He also began mentoring her in vocal control and stage performance. In 1958, she made her recording debut under the name Little Ann on the single "Boxtop," alongside Ike Turner and vocalist Carlson Oliver.

==== Early success: 1960–1965 ====
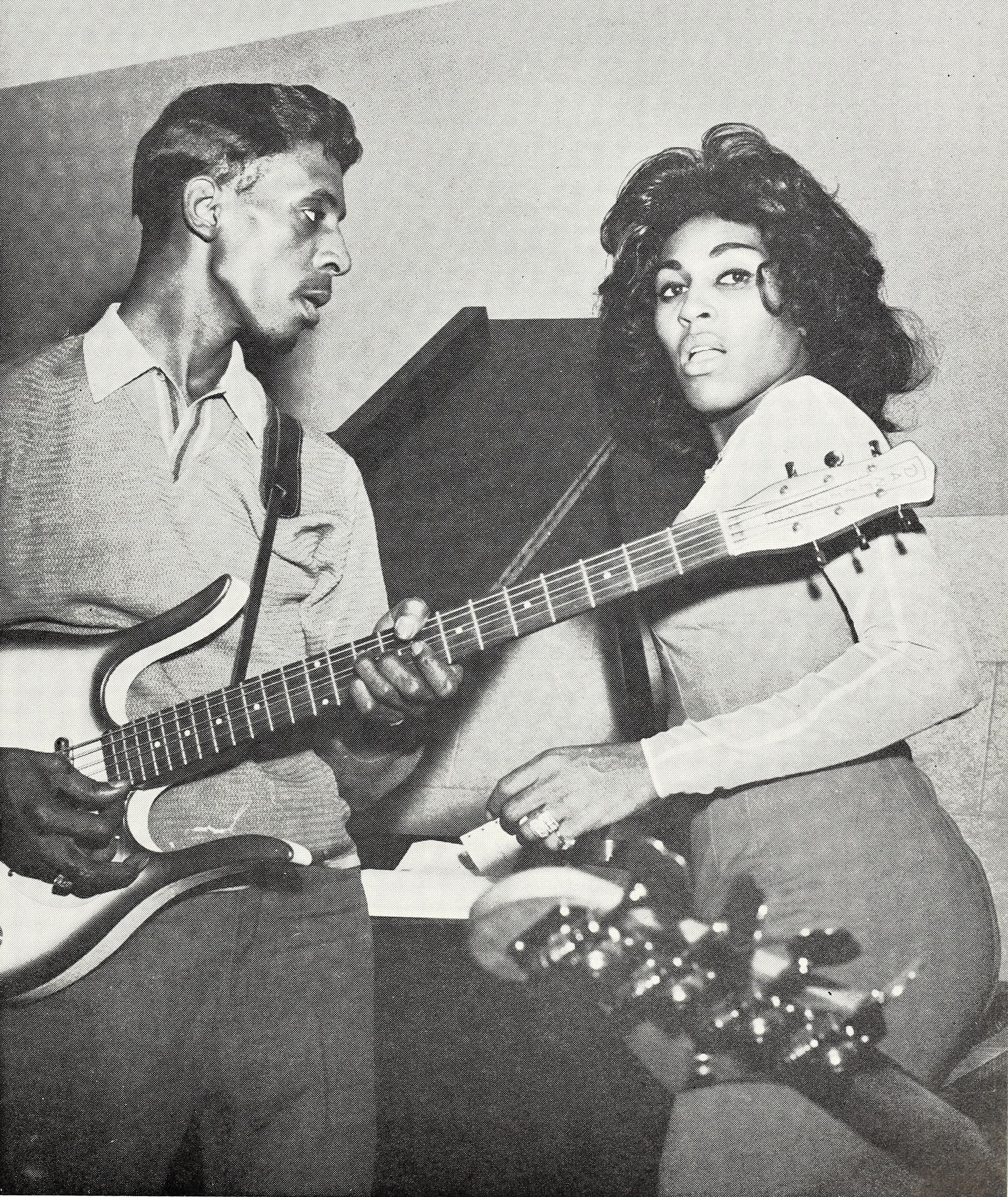
Ike & Tina Turner on the cover of Cash Box (June 30, 1962)

In 1960, Ike Turner wrote "A Fool in Love" for singer Art Lassiter. Bullock was to sing background with Lassiter's backing vocalists, the Artettes. Lassiter failed to show up for the recording session at Technisonic Studios. Since Turner had already paid for the studio time, Bullock suggested that she sing the lead. He decided to use Bullock to record a demo with the intention of erasing her vocals and adding Lassiter's at a later date. Local St. Louis disc jockey Dave Dixon convinced Turner to send the tape to Juggy Murray, president of R&B label Sue Records. Upon hearing the song, Murray was impressed with Bullock's vocals, later stating that "Tina sounded like screaming dirt. It was a funky sound". Murray bought the track and paid Turner a $25,000 advance for the recording and publishing rights.

Murray also convinced Turner to make Bullock "the star of the show". Turner responded by renaming Bullock "Tina" because it rhymed with Sheena. He was inspired by Sheena, Queen of the Jungle and Nyoka the Jungle Girl to create her stage persona. Turner added his last name and trademarked the name "Tina Turner" as a form of protection; his idea was that if Bullock left him as his previous singers had, he could replace her with another "Tina Turner". However, family and friends still called her Ann.

Bullock was introduced to the public as Tina Turner with the single "A Fool in Love" in July 1960. It reached number 2 on the Hot R&B Sides chart and number 27 on the Billboard Hot 100. Journalist Kurt Loder described the track as "the blackest record to ever creep into the white pop charts since Ray Charles's gospel-styled 'What'd I Say' that previous summer". Another single from the duo, "It's Gonna Work Out Fine", reached number 14 on the Hot 100 and number 2 on the R&B chart in 1961, earning them a Grammy nomination for Best Rock and Roll Performance. Other singles Ike & Tina Turner released between 1960 and 1962 included the R&B hits "I Idolize You", "Poor Fool", and "Tra La La La La".

After the release of "A Fool in Love" the Ike & Tina Turner Revue was formed. The Ikettes served as backing vocalists and dancers, and Ike Turner remained in the background as the bandleader of the Kings of Rhythm. He put the entire revue through a rigorous touring schedule across the United States, performing 90 days straight in venues around the country. Tina Turner became the lead vocalist. During the days of the Chitlin' Circuit, the Ike & Tina Turner Revue built a reputation as "one of the hottest, most durable, and potentially most explosive of all R&B ensembles", rivaling the James Brown Revue in terms of musical spectacle. Due to their profitable performances, they were able to perform in front of desegregated audiences in Southern clubs and hotels.

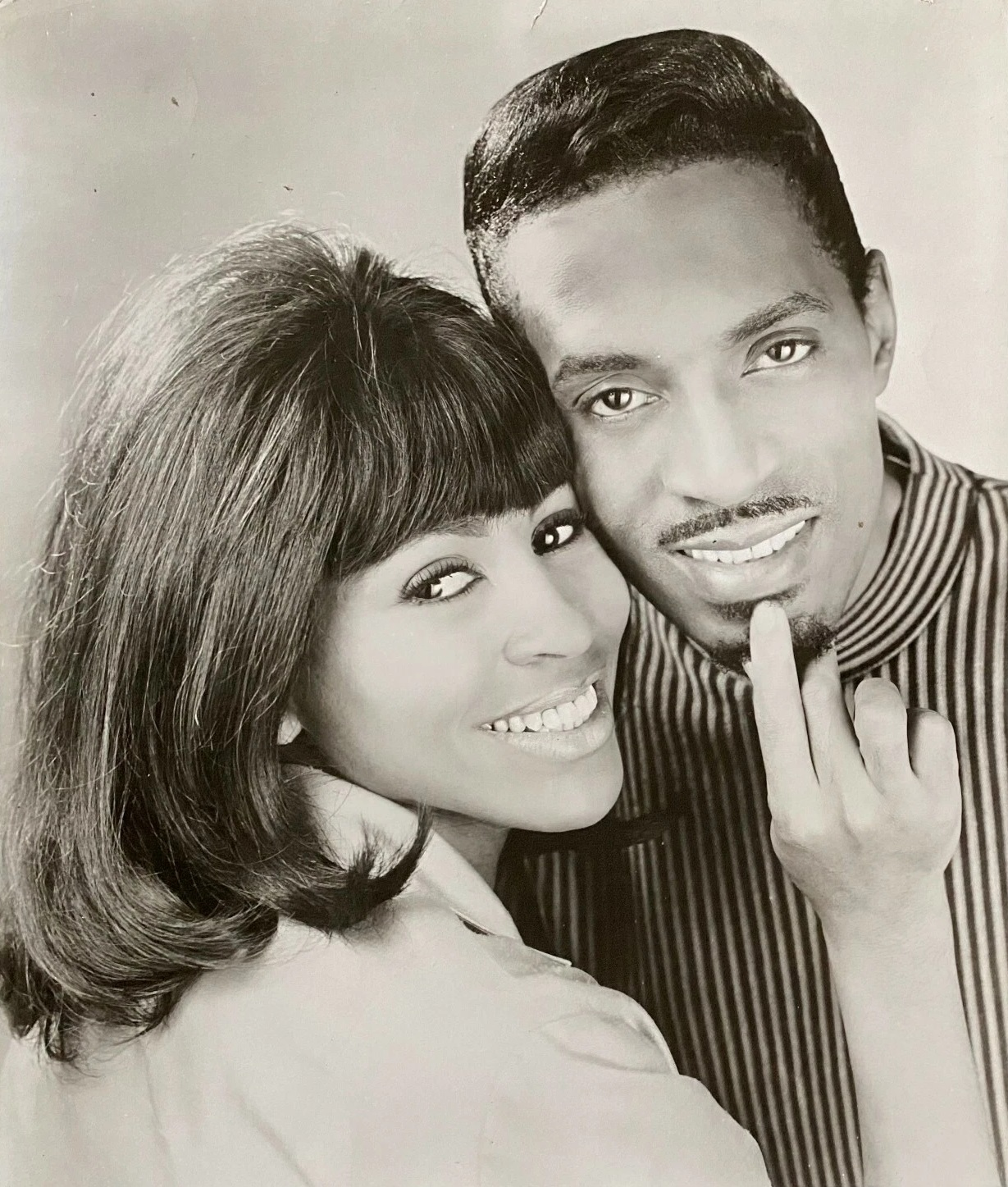
Publicity photo of Ike & Tina Turner, 1965

Between 1963 and 1965, the band toured constantly and produced moderately successful R&B singles. Tina Turner's first credited single as a solo artist, "Too Many Ties That Bind"/"We Need an Understanding", was released from Ike Turner's label Sonja Records in 1964. Another single by the duo, "You Can't Miss Nothing That You Never Had", reached number 29 on the Billboard R&B chart. After their tenure at Sue Records, the duo signed with more than ten labels during the remainder of the decade, including Kent, Cenco, Tangerine, Pompeii, A&M, and Minit. In 1964, they signed to Warner Bros. Records and Bob Krasnow became their manager. On the Warner Bros. label, they achieved their first charting album with Live! The Ike & Tina Turner Show, peaking at number 8 on the Billboard Hot R&B LP chart in February 1965. Their singles "Tell Her I'm Not Home", released on Loma Records, and "Good Bye, So Long", released on Modern Records, were Top 40 R&B hits in 1965.

Tina Turner's profile was raised after several solo appearances on shows such as American Bandstand and Shindig! while the entire revue appeared on Hollywood a Go-Go. In 1965, music producer Phil Spector attended an Ike & Tina Turner show at a club on the Sunset Strip, and he invited them to appear in the concert film The Big T.N.T. Show.

==== Mainstream success: 1966–1976 ====
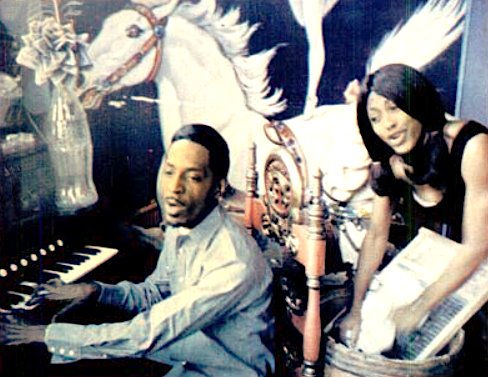
Ike & Tina Turner by Dennis Hopper for the album River Deep – Mountain High (1966)

Impressed by the duo's performance on The Big T.N.T. Show, Spector was eager to produce Tina Turner. Working out a deal with Krasnow, who was her manager and head of Loma, Spector offered $20,000 for creative control over the sessions to produce Turner and have Ike & Tina Turner released from their recording contract. They signed to Spector's Philles label in April 1966 after Tina Turner had already recorded with him. Their first single on his label, "River Deep – Mountain High", was released in May 1966. Spector considered that record, with Turner's maximum energy over the "Wall of Sound", to be his best work. It was successful overseas, reaching number 3 on the UK Singles Chart and number 1 on Los 40 Principales in Spain, but it failed to go any higher than number 88 on the Billboard Hot 100. The impact of the record gave Ike & Tina Turner an opening spot on the Rolling Stones UK tour in the fall of 1966. In November 1967, Tina Turner became the first female artist and the first black artist to appear on the cover of Rolling Stone magazine.

The duo signed with Blue Thumb Records in 1968, releasing the album Outta Season in 1969. The album produced their charted cover of Otis Redding's "I've Been Loving You Too Long". Later that year they released The Hunter album. The title track, Albert King's "The Hunter", earned Turner a Grammy nomination for Best Female R&B Vocal Performance. The success of the albums led to the revue headlining in Las Vegas, where their shows were attended by a variety of celebrities including Sly Stone, Janis Joplin, Cher, James Brown, Ray Charles, Elton John, and Elvis Presley. Sammy Davis Jr. was particularly fond of Turner, and after she filmed an episode of The Name of the Game with him in Las Vegas he surprised her with a Jaguar XJ6. As the decade came to an end, Ike & Tina Turner began performing at music festivals. Tina Turner's fashion evolved from formal dresses to minidresses and revealing outfits. She emerged as a sex symbol and was praised for her sensual performances.

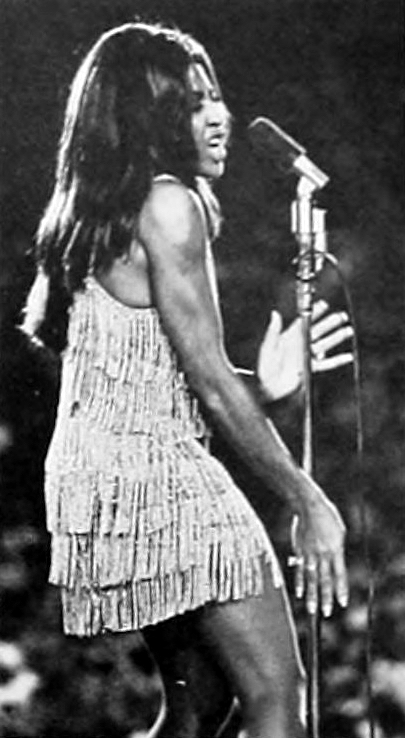
Tina Turner performing at Tulane Stadium in New Orleans, October 1970

In the fall of 1969, Ike & Tina Turner's profile in their home country was raised after opening for the Rolling Stones on their US tour. They gained more exposure from performances on The Ed Sullivan Show, Playboy After Dark, and The Andy Williams Show. The duo released two albums in 1970, Come Together and Workin' Together. Their cover of "I Want to Take You Higher" peaked at number 34 on the Hot 100, whereas the original by Sly and the Family Stone had peaked at number 38. The Come Together and Workin' Together albums marked a turning point in their careers in which they switched from their usual R&B repertoire to incorporate more rock tunes such as "Come Together", "Honky Tonk Woman", and "Get Back".

In early 1971, their cover of Creedence Clearwater Revival's "Proud Mary" became their biggest hit. The single reached number 4 on the Hot 100 and sold more than a million copies, winning them a Grammy for Best R&B Performance by a Duo or Group. In July 1971, their live album, What You Hear Is What You Get, was released. It was recorded at Carnegie Hall and became their first certified Gold album. Later that year they had a Top 40 R&B hit with "Ooh Poo Pah Doo". Their next three singles to chart, "I'm Yours (Use Me Anyway You Wanna)", "Up in Heah", and "Early One Morning" (a Little Richard cover) all peaked at number 47 on the R&B chart.

In 1972, the Turners opened Bolic Sound recording studio near their home in Inglewood. After Liberty was absorbed into United Artists Records, they were assigned to that label. Around this time, Tina Turner began writing more songs. She wrote nine out of the ten tracks on their 1972 album Feel Good. In October 1972, Turner and the Ikettes performed at Star-Spangled Women, a political fundraiser for the 1972 presidential campaign of George McGovern, at Madison Square Garden in New York City.

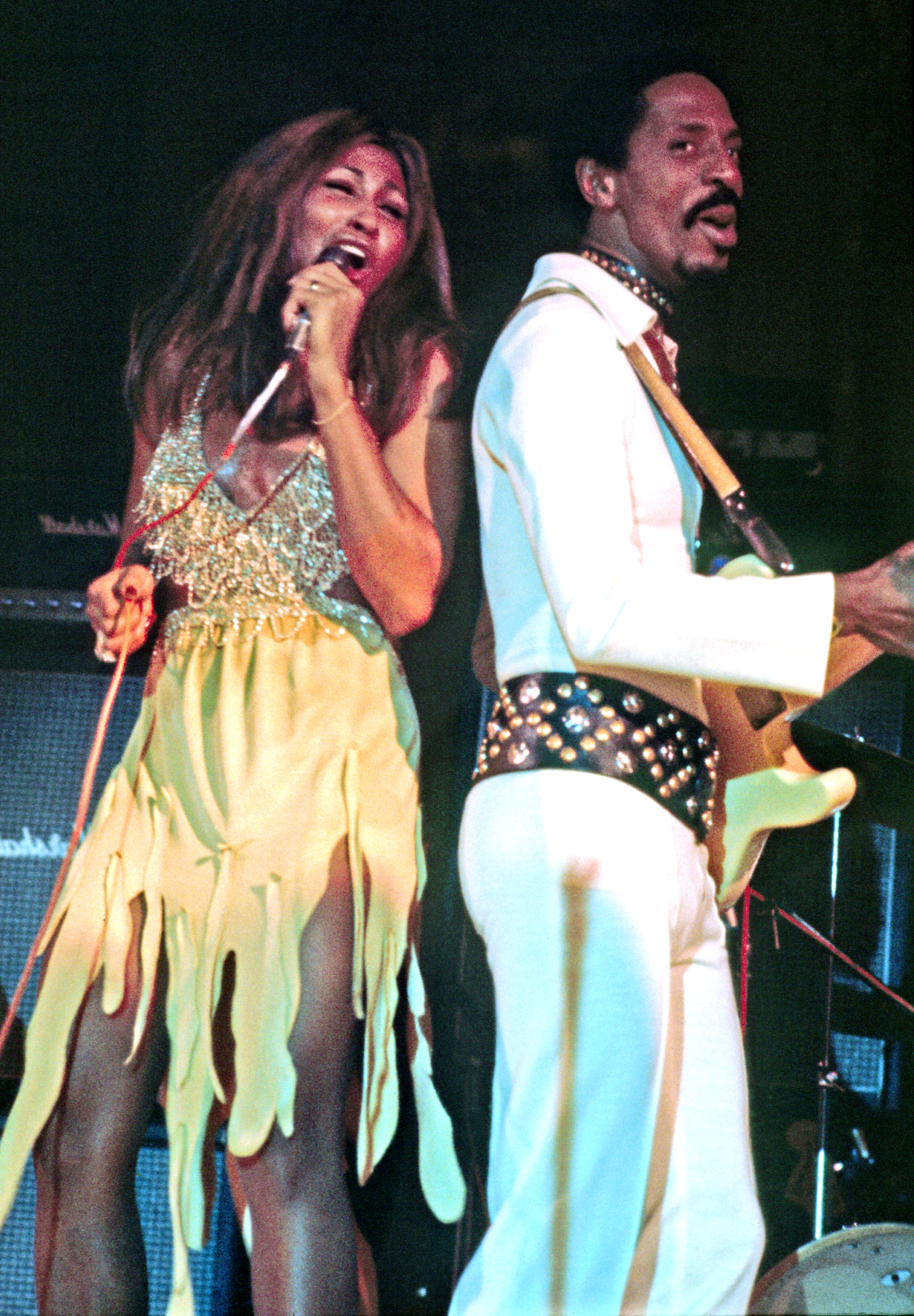
Ike & Tina Turner performing in Hamburg, Germany in 1972

The duo's 1973 hit single "Nutbush City Limits" (number 22 Pop, number 11 R&B), penned by Tina Turner, reached number 1 in Austria, number 4 in the UK, and number 5 in several other countries. It was certified Silver by the BPI for selling a quarter of a million in the UK. As a result of their success, they received the Golden European Record Award, the first ever given, for selling more than one million records of "Nutbush City Limits" in Europe. Their follow-up hits included "Sweet Rhode Island Red", and "Sexy Ida" in 1974. That year, the duo released the Grammy-nominated album The Gospel According to Ike & Tina, which was nominated for Best Soul Gospel Performance. Ike also received a solo nomination for his single "Father Alone" from the album.

Tina Turner's first solo album, Tina Turns the Country On!, was released in September 1974, and earned her a nomination for Best R&B Vocal Performance, Female. That year, she filmed the rock opera Tommy in which she played the Acid Queen, a drug-addicted prostitute; her performance was critically acclaimed. Filming alone in London gave Turner a sense of independence. In 1975 she told People that she didn't want Ike to think she was abandoning him: "I've always been in there helping him and now, in Tommy, I've learned I can do things without him. Ike'll be proud, but he's gonna miss me."

Shortly after filming wrapped, Turner appeared on Ann-Margret's TV special. Following the release of Tommy in 1975, Tina Turner released another solo album: Acid Queen. The album reached number 39 on the Billboard R&B chart. It produced the charting singles "Baby, Get It On" and a cover of Led Zeppelin's "Whole Lotta Love".

In 1976, Ike & Tina Turner headlined at the Waldorf Astoria New York and signed a television deal with CBS-TV. Ike made plans for them to leave United Artists Records for a five-year deal with Cream Records for $150,000 per year; the deal was to be signed on July 5.

On July 1, 1976, following an altercation, Tina Turner fled from Ike Turner in Dallas, Texas. After Tina's separation from Ike, United Artists released two more albums that were credited to the duo: Delilah's Power (1977) and Airwaves (1978).

=== Solo career ===
==== Early solo career: 1976–1982 ====
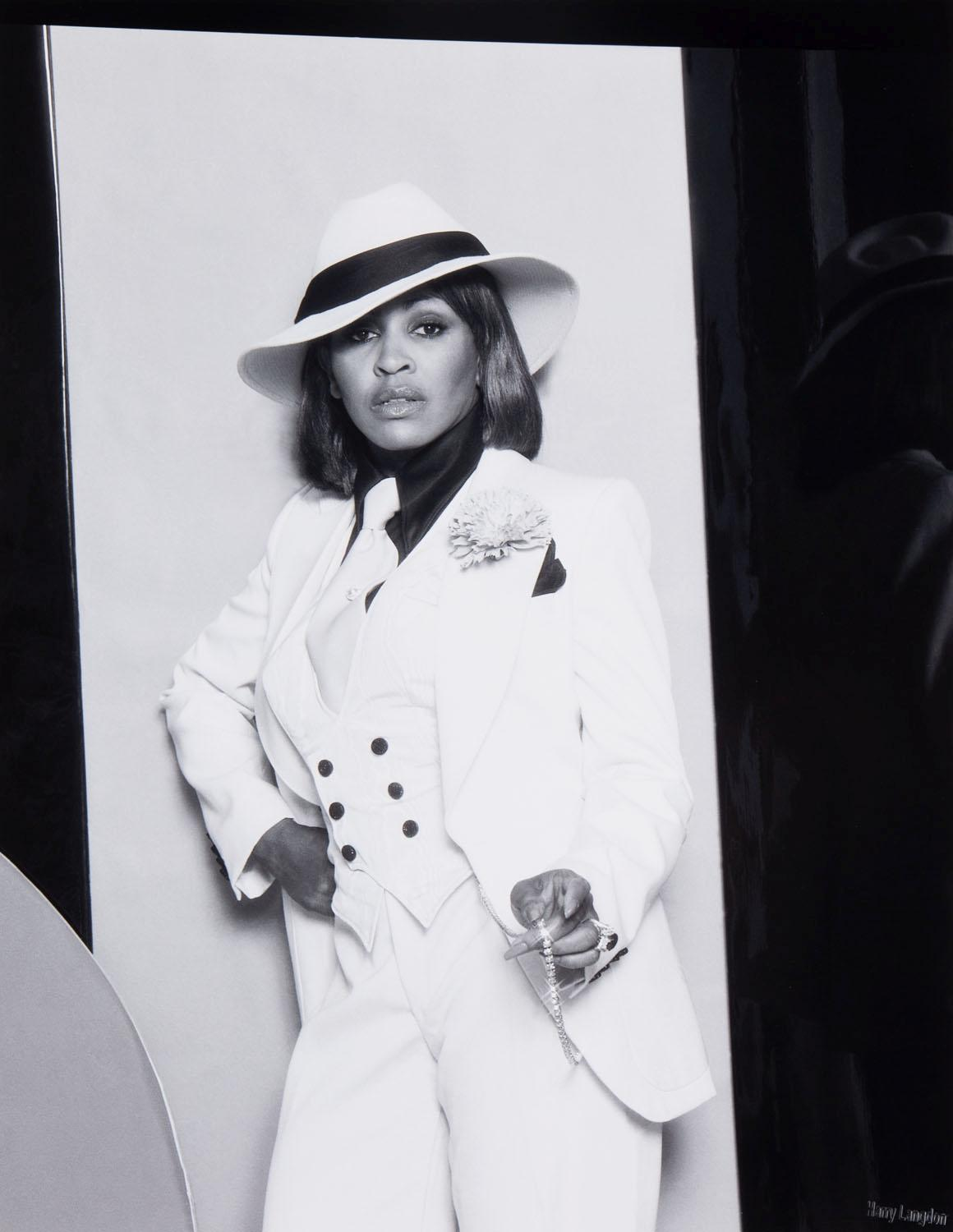
Turner in a 1977 portrait by Harry Langdon Jr.

Following the Turners' separation, lawsuits mounted for canceled Ike & Tina Turner gigs. Tina Turner earned income by appearing on TV shows such as Hollywood Squares, Donny & Marie, The Sonny & Cher Comedy Hour, and The Brady Bunch Hour. After receiving funding from Mike Stewart, an executive at United Artists Records, Turner returned to performing in order to pay off her debts. In 1977, she formed a new band and re-emerged with new costumes designed by Bob Mackie. She took her act to smaller venues and headlined a series of cabaret shows at Caesars Palace in Las Vegas. Later that year, she embarked on her first solo concert tour in Australia.

Tina Turner and Tom Jones starred in an HBO TV special that was shot at the Warner Theatre in Washington, DC, in September 1978. Around that time, her third solo album, Rough, was released on United Artists with distribution in North America and Europe on EMI Records. That album, along with its 1979 follow-up, Love Explosion, which included a brief diversion to disco music, failed to chart, so United Artists and Turner parted ways. Without the premise of a hit record, she continued performing and headlined her second tour.

In 1979, Australian manager Roger Davies agreed to manage Turner after seeing her perform at the Fairmont Hotel in San Francisco. In early 1979, Turner worked in Italy as a regular performer on the Rete 1 TV series Luna Park, hosted by Pippo Baudo and Heather Parisi. Later that year, she embarked on a controversial five-week tour of South Africa during the apartheid regime. She later admitted that she was "naive about the politics in South Africa" at the time.

In October 1981, Rod Stewart attended Turner's show at the Ritz in New York City and invited her to perform "Hot Legs" with him on Saturday Night Live. In November, Turner opened three shows for the Rolling Stones during their 1981 American Tour. Turner performed in March 1982 in the Willem Ruis show (Netherlands), which resulted in the hit "Shame, Shame, Shame" reaching number 47 in the Netherlands. In 1982, Turner recorded the Temptations' "Ball of Confusion" with the UK production team B.E.F. (a side project of the band Heaven 17) which featured on their album Music of Quality and Distinction - Volume 1 and became a hit in European dance clubs. She filmed a music video for "Ball of Confusion" that aired on the fledgling music video channel MTV, becoming one of the first black American artists to gain airtime on the channel. Also in 1982, Turner appeared as a special guest on Chuck Berry's television special performed at The Roxy in West Hollywood.

Turner performing at St David's Hall in Cardiff, 1984

==== Career resurgence and superstardom: 1983–2000 ====
Until 1983, Turner was considered a nostalgia act, performing mostly at hotel ballrooms and clubs in the United States. During her second stint at the Ritz, she signed with Capitol Records in 1983. In November 1983, she released her cover of Al Green's "Let's Stay Together", which was co-produced by Martyn Ware (of Heaven 17/B.E.F) and featured Glenn Gregory of Heaven 17 on backing vocals. It entered several European charts, and reached number 6 in the UK. In the US, the song peaked at number 26 on the Billboard Hot 100, number 1 on Hot Dance Club Songs, and number 3 on Hot Black Singles.

Following the single's surprise success, and a further minor hit with her version of the Beatles' classic "Help", which also reached the UK Top 40 in March 1984, Capitol Records approved a studio album. Turner had two weeks to record her Private Dancer album, which was released in May 1984. It reached number 3 on the Billboard 200 and number 2 in the United Kingdom. Private Dancer was certified 5× Platinum in the United States, and sold 10 million copies worldwide, becoming her most successful album. Also in May 1984, Capitol issued the single "What's Love Got to Do with It", which had previously been recorded by the British pop group Bucks Fizz. Following the album's release, Turner joined Lionel Richie as the opening act on his tour.

"Turner was in her mid-40s — 'an age some in the music industry considered past an artist’s prime' when her 1984 comeback hit". On September 1, 1984, Turner achieved her first and only number 1 on the Billboard Hot 100 with "What's Love Got to Do with It". The follow-up singles "Better Be Good to Me" and "Private Dancer" were also both US Top 10 hits. The same year, she duetted with David Bowie on a cover of Iggy Pop's "Tonight". Released as a single in November, it peaked at number 53 in both the UK and the US. At his spring 1985 ready-to-wear runway show presented in fall of '84, Paris designer Karl Lagerfeld put his models in Tina Turner wigs and said he was "mad for her."

Turner won three Grammys at the 27th Annual Grammy Awards, including the Grammy Award for Record of the Year for "What's Love Got to Do with It". In February 1985, she embarked on her second world tour to support the Private Dancer album. Two nights were filmed at Birmingham, England's NEC Arena and later released as a concert on home video. She was often dressed in clothes by designer Azzedine Alaïa for this tour and sometimes dedicated songs to him. During this time, she also contributed vocals to the USA for Africa benefit song "We Are the World".

Turner's success continued when she traveled to Australia to star opposite Mel Gibson in the 1985 post-apocalyptic film sequel Mad Max Beyond Thunderdome. The movie provided her with her first acting role in ten years; she portrayed the glamorous Aunty Entity, the ruler of Bartertown. Upon release, critical response to her performance was generally positive. The film was a global success, grossing more than $36 million in the United States. Turner later received the NAACP Image Award for Outstanding Actress for her role in the film. She recorded two songs for the film, "We Don't Need Another Hero (Thunderdome)" and "One of the Living". Both songs became successes, with the first becoming a transatlantic Top 3 hit, and the latter winning her a Grammy Award for Best Female Rock Vocal Performance. In July 1985, Turner performed at Live Aid alongside Mick Jagger. Their performance included an infamous moment when Jagger ripped her skirt off to reveal black swimsuit-type bottoms underneath. Turner released a duet, "It's Only Love", with Bryan Adams. It was nominated for a Grammy Award, and the music video won an MTV Video Music Award for Best Stage Performance.

In 1986, Turner released her sixth solo album, Break Every Rule, which reached number 1 in four countries and sold over five million copies worldwide within its first year of release. The album sold more than a million copies in the United States and Germany alone. The album featured the singles "Typical Male", "Two People", "What You Get Is What You See", and the Grammy-winning "Back Where You Started". Prior to the album's release, Turner published her autobiography I, Tina, which became a bestseller. That year, she received a star on the Hollywood Walk of Fame. Her Break Every Rule World Tour, which began in March 1987, was the highest-grossing tour by a female artist in the 1980s. In January 1988, Turner performed in front of approximately 180,000 at Maracanã Stadium in Rio de Janeiro, Brazil, setting a Guinness World Record at the time for the largest paying concert attendance for a solo artist. In April 1988, Turner released the Tina Live in Europe album, which won a Grammy Award for Best Female Rock Vocal Performance. After taking time off following the end of the tour, she emerged with the Foreign Affair album in 1989. It reached number 1 in eight countries, including in the UK (5× Platinum), her first number-one album there. The album sold over six million copies worldwide and included the international hit single "The Best".

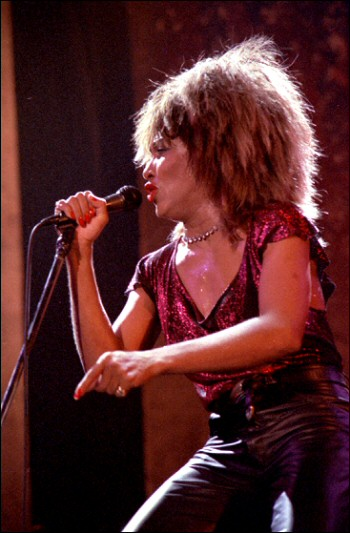
Turner performing at Drammenshallen in Norway, 1985

In 1990, Turner embarked on her Foreign Affair European Tour, which drew in nearly four million spectators—breaking the record for a European tour that was previously set by the Rolling Stones. In October 1991 Turner released her first greatest hits compilation Simply the Best, which sold seven million copies worldwide. The album is her biggest seller in the UK, where it is certified 8× Platinum with more than two million copies sold.

In 1991, Ike & Tina Turner were inducted into the Rock and Roll Hall of Fame. Ike Turner was incarcerated at the time and Tina Turner did not attend. Turner stated through her publicist that she was taking a leave of absence following her tour and she felt "emotionally unequipped to return to the US and respond to the night of celebration in the manner she would want". Phil Spector accepted the award on their behalf.

In 1993, the semi-autobiographical film What's Love Got to Do with It was released. The film starred Angela Bassett as Tina Turner and Laurence Fishburne as Ike Turner; they received Best Actress and Best Actor Oscar nominations for their roles. While she was not heavily involved in the film, Turner contributed to the soundtrack for What's Love Got to Do with It, re-recording old songs and several new songs. The single "I Don't Wanna Fight" from the soundtrack was a Top 10 hit in the US and UK, while the album itself became her second UK number one. In 1993 Turner embarked on her What's Love? Tour.

In 1995, Turner returned to the studio, releasing "GoldenEye", which was written by Bono and the Edge of U2 for the James Bond film GoldenEye. In 1996 Turner released the Wildest Dreams album, accompanied by her "Wildest Dreams Tour". In September 1999, before celebrating her 60th birthday, Turner released the dance-infused song "When the Heartache Is Over" as the leading single from her tenth and final solo album, Twenty Four Seven. The success of the single and the following tour helped the album become certified Gold by the RIAA. The Twenty Four Seven Tour was the highest-grossing tour of 2000, grossing over $120 million. Her two concerts at Wembley Stadium were recorded by the director David Mallet and released in the DVD One Last Time Live in Concert. At a concert in Zurich, Switzerland in July 2000, Turner announced that she would retire at the end of the tour.

==== Later career: 2001–2021 ====
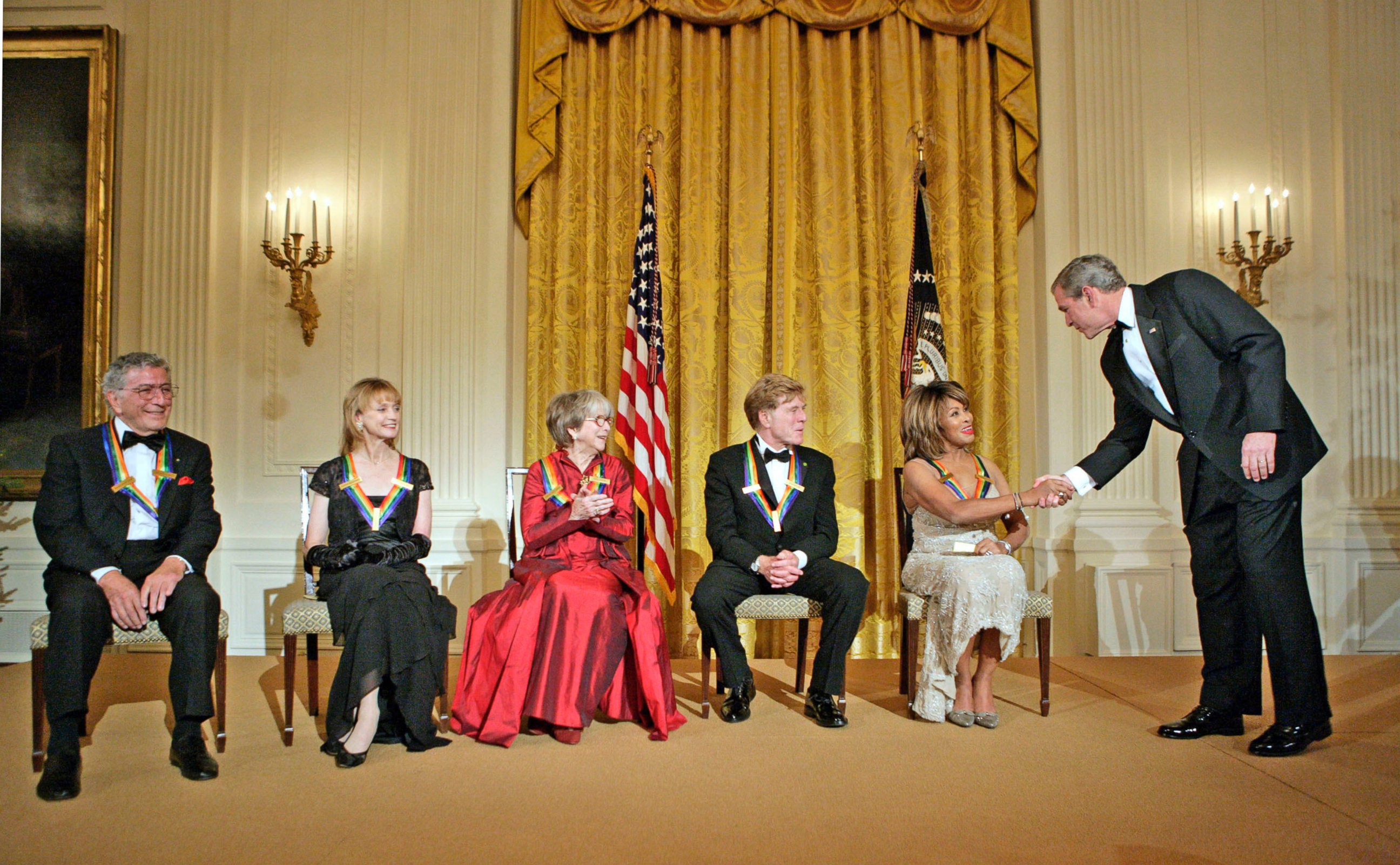
President George W. Bush congratulates Turner at the 2005 Kennedy Center Honors

In November 2004, Turner released All the Best, which debuted at number 2 on the Billboard 200 in 2005, her highest-charting album in the United States. The album went Platinum in the US three months after its release and reached Platinum status in seven other countries, including the UK.

In December 2005, Turner was awarded the Kennedy Center Honors at the John F. Kennedy Center for the Performing Arts in Washington, DC.

In February 2006, Turner released "Teach Me Again", a duet single with Italian singer-songwriter Elisa that was recorded for the anthology film All the Invisible Children. The whole revenue from the single's sales was donated to charity projects for children led by the World Food Programme and UNICEF.

Turner made a public comeback in February 2008 at the Grammy Awards, where she performed alongside Beyoncé. In addition, she won a Grammy as a featured artist on River: The Joni Letters.

In October 2008, Turner embarked on her first tour in nearly ten years with the Tina!: 50th Anniversary Tour. In support of the tour, Turner released a greatest hits compilation. The tour was a huge success and became one of the bestselling tours in history. In 2009, Turner retired from live performances.

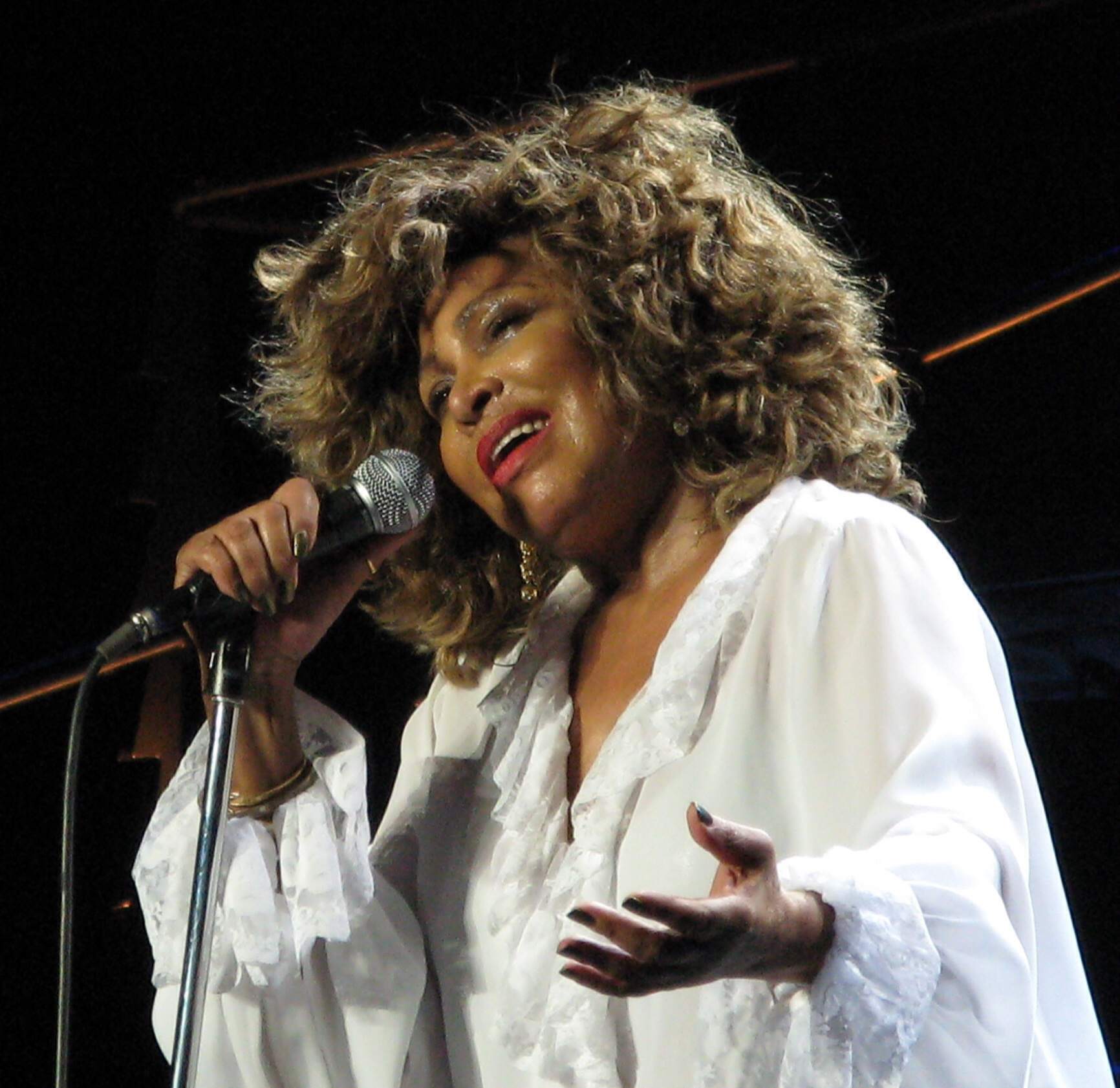
Turner during her 50th Anniversary Tour, 2009

In 2009, Turner co-founded a global music foundation, Beyond Foundation, with Swiss Christian musician Regula Curti and Swiss Tibetan Buddhist Dechen Shak-Dagsay. Turner co-released four albums of spiritual or uplifting music released through projects with Beyond: Buddhist and Christian Prayers (2009), Children (2011), Love Within (2014), and Awakening (2017). As of 2023, the Swiss Beyond Foundation remains active and enables the collaboration of musical artists from different parts of the world.

In April 2010, mainly due to an online campaign by fans of Rangers Football Club, Turner's 1989 hit, "The Best", returned to the UK singles chart, peaking at number 9. This made Turner the first female recording artist in UK chart history to score Top 40 hits in six consecutive decades (1960s–2010s). In 2011, Beyond's second album Children – With Children United in Prayer followed and charted again in Switzerland. Turner promoted the album by performing on TV shows in Germany and Switzerland. In April 2013, Turner appeared on the cover of the German issue of Vogue magazine at the age of 73, becoming the oldest person to be featured on the cover of Vogue. In February 2014, Parlophone Records released a new compilation titled Love Songs.

In December 2016 Turner announced that she had been working on Tina, a musical based on her life story, in collaboration with Phyllida Lloyd and Stage Entertainment. The show opened at the Aldwych Theatre in London in April 2018 with Adrienne Warren in the lead role. Warren reprised her role on Broadway in the fall of 2019.

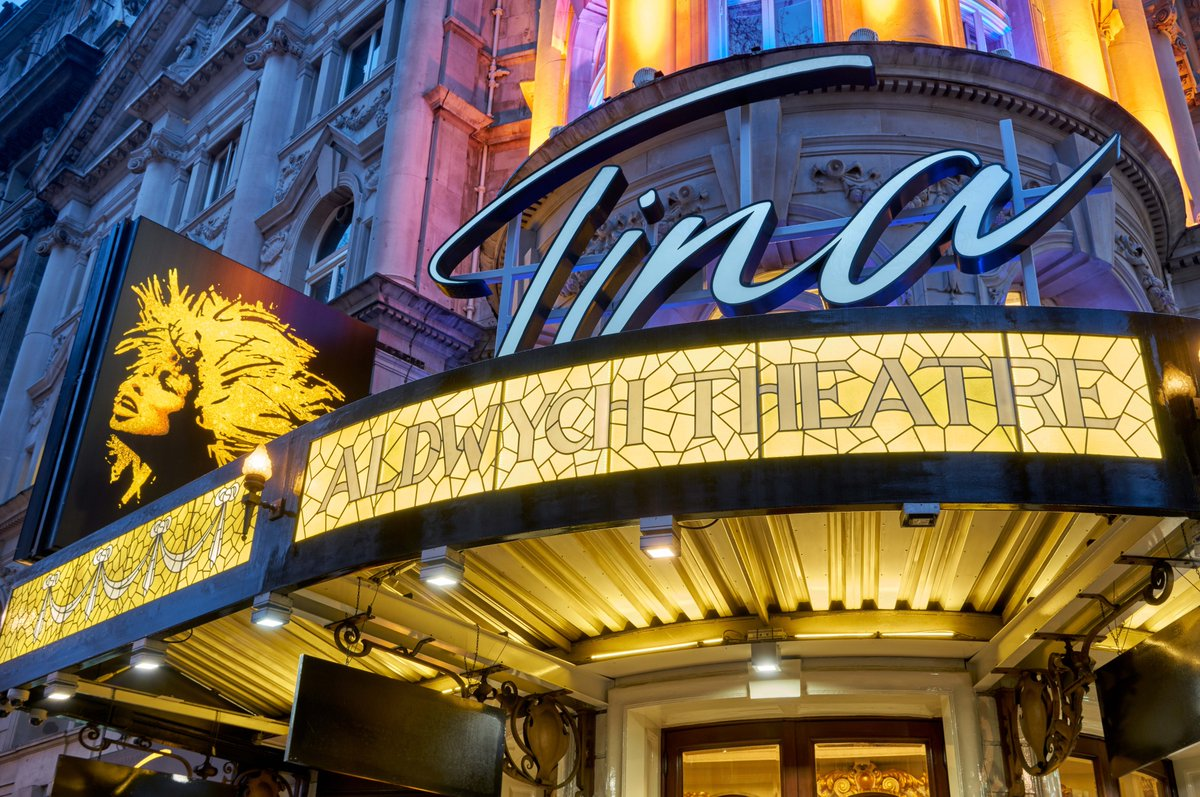
The musical Tina playing at the Aldwych Theatre in London, 2019

Turner received the 2018 Grammy Lifetime Achievement Award and her second memoir, My Love Story, was released in October 2018. In 2020, she came out of retirement to collaborate with Norwegian producer Kygo on a remix of "What's Love Got to Do with It". With this release, she became the first artist to have a Top 40 hit in seven consecutive decades in the UK.

In 2020, Turner released her third book, Happiness Becomes You: A Guide to Changing Your Life for Good. She co-wrote the book with American author Taro Gold and Swiss singer Regula Curti. It was chosen by Amazon's editors as a Best Nonfiction book of 2020. In 2021, Turner appeared in the HBO documentary film Tina directed by Dan Lindsay and T. J. Martin.

In October 2021, Turner sold her music rights to BMG Rights Management for an estimated $50 million, with Warner Music still handling distribution of her music. Later that month, Turner was inducted into the Rock and Roll Hall of Fame as a solo artist, accepting her award via satellite from her home near Zurich, Switzerland.

== Personal life and death ==
=== Family and relationships ===
While still in Brownsville, Turner fell in love for the first time with Harry Taylor. They met at a high school basketball game. Taylor initially attended a different school, but he relocated to be near her. In 1986, she told Rolling Stone: "Harry was real popular and had tons of girlfriends, but eventually I got him, and we went steady for a year." Their relationship ended after she discovered that Taylor had married another woman who was expecting his child.

After moving to St. Louis, Turner and her sister Alline met Ike Turner and his Kings of Rhythm in 1956. Alline soon began dating the band's drummer, Eugene "Gene" Washington, and Turner later dated the band's saxophonist, Raymond Hill. Midway through her senior year of high school, Turner learned she was pregnant by Raymond Hill and moved into Ike Turner's home, where Hill lived along with other members of the Kings of Rhythm. She later recalled, "I didn't love him as much as I'd loved Harry. But he was good-looking. I thought, 'My baby's going to be beautiful.'" Their relationship ended after Hill left the band, following a broken ankle sustained during a wrestling match with Kings of Rhythm vocalist Carlson Oliver. He returned to his hometown of Clarksdale before their son, Craig, was born in August 1958, leaving Turner to raise Craig as a single parent.

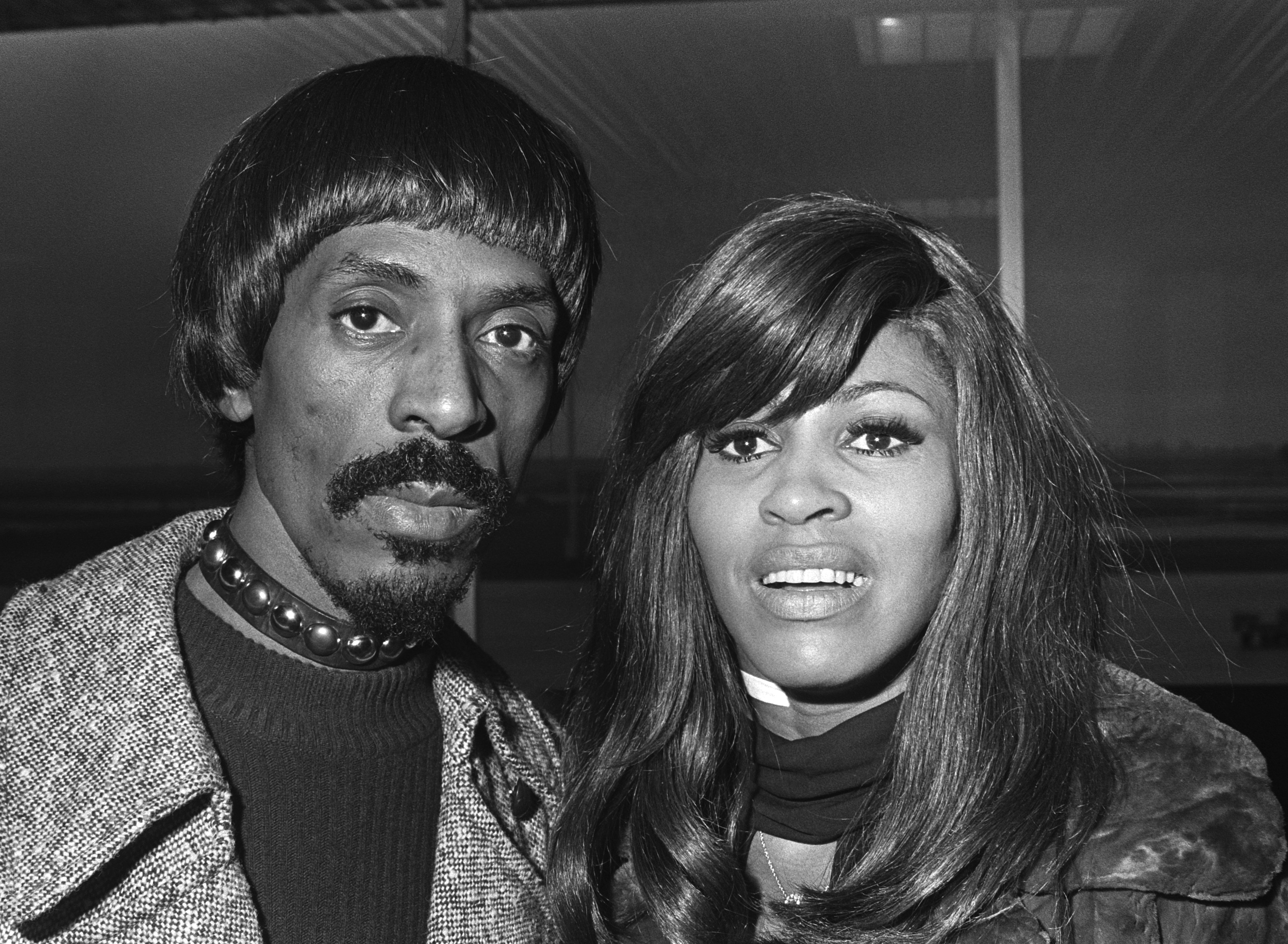
Ike & Tina Turner arriving at Amsterdam Airport Schiphol, 1971

Turner likened her early relationship with Ike Turner to that of a "brother and sister from another lifetime." They were initially platonic friends, and she eventually moved into his house. They became intimate one night in January 1960 after Ike had broken up with his girlfriend Lorraine Taylor. Turner later recalled that she had gone to sleep in his bed after another musician threatened to enter her room. She became pregnant, and Ike soon reconciled with Taylor.

After recording "A Fool in Love" in 1960, Turner told Ike she did not want to continue the relationship. She stated that he responded by striking her in the head with a wooden shoe stretcher. Turner said the incident was the first time he instilled fear in her, but she chose to stay because she "really did care about him." Following the birth of their son Ronnie in October 1960, they moved to Los Angeles in 1962 and married in Tijuana. In 1963, Ike purchased a house in the View Park area. Shortly thereafter, they brought their son Ronnie, Turner's son Craig, and Ike's two sons with Taylor (Ike Jr. and Michael) from St. Louis to live with them.

Ike's violence and infidelity during their marriage led Turner to attempt suicide in 1968 by overdosing on Valium pills. She later said, "It was my relationship with Ike that made me most unhappy. At first, I had really been in love with him. Look what he'd done for me. But he was totally unpredictable." She later wrote:

He threw hot coffee in my face, giving me third-degree burns.

He used my nose as a punching bag so many times that I could taste blood running down my throat when I sang.

He broke my jaw. And I couldn't remember what it was like not to have a black eye.

Turner left Ike abruptly after a fight that occurred while they were en route to the Dallas Statler Hilton on July 1, 1976. Once he fell asleep at the hotel, Turner left their suite and ran across a freeway to a nearby Ramada Inn with only 36 cents and a Mobil credit card in her pocket. On July 1, 1976, following an altercation, Tina Turner fled from Ike Turner in Dallas, Texas. She stayed for several months with saxophonist Wayne Shorter and his wife Ana Maria, friends she had met in the Los Angeles music scene; Tina credited them with helping stabilize her life.

On July 27, Turner filed for divorce on the grounds of irreconcilable differences, and the divorce was finalized on March 29, 1978. In the final divorce decree, Turner took responsibility for missed concert dates as well as an IRS lien and retained songwriter royalties from songs she had written, but Ike received the publishing royalties for his compositions and hers. She also kept her two Jaguars, her furs, her jewelry, and her stage name. Turner gave Ike her share of their Bolic Sound recording studio, publishing companies, and real estate, and he kept his four cars. For almost two years, she received food stamps and played small clubs to pay off debts.

In a 1981 interview with People, Turner revealed publicly for the first time that she had been abused by Ike. He could be "very loving," Turner said, but "I was living a life of death, I didn't exist. I didn't fear him killing me when I left, because I was already dead. When I walked out, I didn't look back." In his autobiography, Takin' Back My Name, Ike said: "Sure, I've slapped Tina. We had fights and there have been times when I punched her to the ground without thinking. But I never beat her." In a 1999 interview on The Roseanne Show, Roseanne Barr urged Ike to publicly apologize to Turner. In 2007, Ike told Jet that he still loved Turner and he had written a letter apologizing for "putting her and the kids through that kind of stuff", but he never sent it.

After Ike's death on December 12, 2007, Turner's spokesperson issued the following statement: "Tina hasn't had any contact with Ike in more than 30 years. No further comment will be made." In 2018, Turner told The Sunday Times that "as an old person, I have forgiven him, but I would not work with him. He asked for one more tour with me, and I said, 'No, absolutely not.' Ike wasn't someone you could forgive and allow him back in."

In 1986, Turner met German music executive Erwin Bach, who was sent by her European record label (EMI) to greet her at Düsseldorf Airport. Turner said that she experienced "love at first sight" when she met Bach. Bach was over sixteen years her junior. Initially friends, they began dating later that year and moved to Switzerland in the mid-1990s. In July 2013, after 27 years together, they married at their residence on Lake Zurich in Küsnacht, Switzerland.

Turner described Bach as her soul mate. In 2017, after Turner had been diagnosed with kidney cancer, Bach donated a kidney to her and she underwent transplant surgery. Turner remained married to Bach until her death in 2023.

Turner had four sons, two of whom were biological and two of whom were adopted. She gave birth to Raymond Craig Hill (later Craig Raymond Turner) on August 20, 1958; his father was Kings of Rhythm saxophonist Raymond Hill, and Ike Turner later adopted him and changed his name. Her second biological son, Ronald "Ronnie" Renelle Turner, was born October 27, 1960; his father was Ike Turner. Turner also adopted Ike's two children, Ike Jr. and Michael, from his relationship with Lorraine Taylor.

During the 1960s, Turner's touring limited her time at home. By the 1970s, she was home more often and sometimes brought her musically inclined sons on the road. She described a close but disciplined relationship with them: "We can have fun together, but when it comes time for me to put my foot down, I do it." Following her divorce, Ike sent the four boys to live with her and provided one month's rent. Soon thereafter, Michael and Ike Jr. returned to live with their father and Ronnie was sent to a boarding school. In her 1986 autobiography, Turner wrote that she became "a little bit estranged" from all her sons except Craig. Later interviews and reports indicated ongoing tensions, though she said she was still "there for the boys."

Craig Turner, a real estate agent, died by an apparent suicide in July 2018. He never married and had no children. "Craig was a troubled soul," Turner wrote in her 2018 memoir. She attended Craig's funeral and spread his ashes into the Pacific Ocean off the coast of California.

As a teenager, Ronnie Turner played bass guitar in a band called Manufactured Funk with musician Patrick Moten. He toured with his mother in 1979. In 1989, Turner said she had cut him off because he was "determined to be self-destructive." Ronnie married French singer Afida Turner in 2007, had two children from a previous relationship, and died of complications from colon cancer in December 2022. Turner paid tribute to him on her Instagram page.

Ike Turner Jr. worked as a sound engineer at Bolic Sound and for his mother after the divorce. In her 1986 autobiography, Turner wrote that Ike Jr. "was doing great with me. Then Ike told him he couldn't work for me anymore". He co-produced his father's Grammy-winning album Risin' with the Blues. He also performed with former Ikette Randi Love as Sweet Randi Love and the Love Thang Band. Ike Turner Jr. had little contact with his mother in his later years. He struggled with addiction and died of kidney failure in October 2025. He did not have children.

Michael Turner, Turner's last surviving child, has struggled with addiction and lived in a Southern California convalescent home. Turner provided financial support despite limited contact.

=== Legal issues ===
In November 1976, after Turner was stopped in Beverly Hills, California, for a traffic violation, a police officer found a .38-caliber revolver in her purse. She was arrested and charged with a misdemeanor. Her attorney said she was carrying the gun for safety reasons due to threats on her life.

In 1978, Diners Club Corp. sued Turner and her company, Tina's Operation Oops, claiming she owed over $26,000 for purchases made using her credit card.

=== Religion ===
Turner sometimes referred to herself as a "Buddhist–Baptist", alluding to her upbringing in the Baptist church where her father was a deacon and her later conversion to Buddhism as an adult. In a 2016 interview with Lion's Roar magazine, she declared, "I consider myself a Buddhist." The February 15, 1979, issue of Jet magazine featured Turner with her Buddhist altar on the cover. Turner credited the Liturgy of Nichiren Daishonin for her introduction to spiritual knowledge.

Turner stated in her 1986 autobiography that she was introduced to Nichiren Buddhism by Valerie Bishop, who Ike hired to work at their studio, Bolic Sound, in 1973. Turner later stated in her 2020 spiritual memoir Happiness Becomes You that her son, Ronnie Turner, first suggested she might benefit from chanting. Turner practiced Buddhism with her neighborhood Soka Gakkai International chanting group. After chanting nam-myōhō-renge-kyō, Turner noticed positive changes in her life, which she attributed to her newfound spiritual practice. She said: "I realized that I had within me everything I needed to change my life for the better." During the hardest times of her life, Turner chanted four hours per day, and although in later life she no longer chanted as much, she still maintained a daily practice.

Turner likened Buddhist chanting to singing. She told Lion's Roar: "Nam-myoho-renge-kyo is a song. In the Soka Gakkai tradition we are taught how to sing it. It is a sound and a rhythm and it touches a place inside you. That place we try to reach is the subconscious mind. I believe that it is the highest place and, if you communicate with it, that is when you receive information on what to do." Dramatizations of Turner chanting were included both in the 1993 film What's Love Got to Do with It and in the 2021 documentary film Tina.

Turner met with the 14th Dalai Lama, in Einsiedeln, Switzerland, on August 2, 2005. She also met with Swiss-Tibetan Buddhist singer Dechen Shak-Dagsay and in 2009 co-created a spiritual music project with Shak-Dagsay and Swiss singer Regula Curti called Beyond.

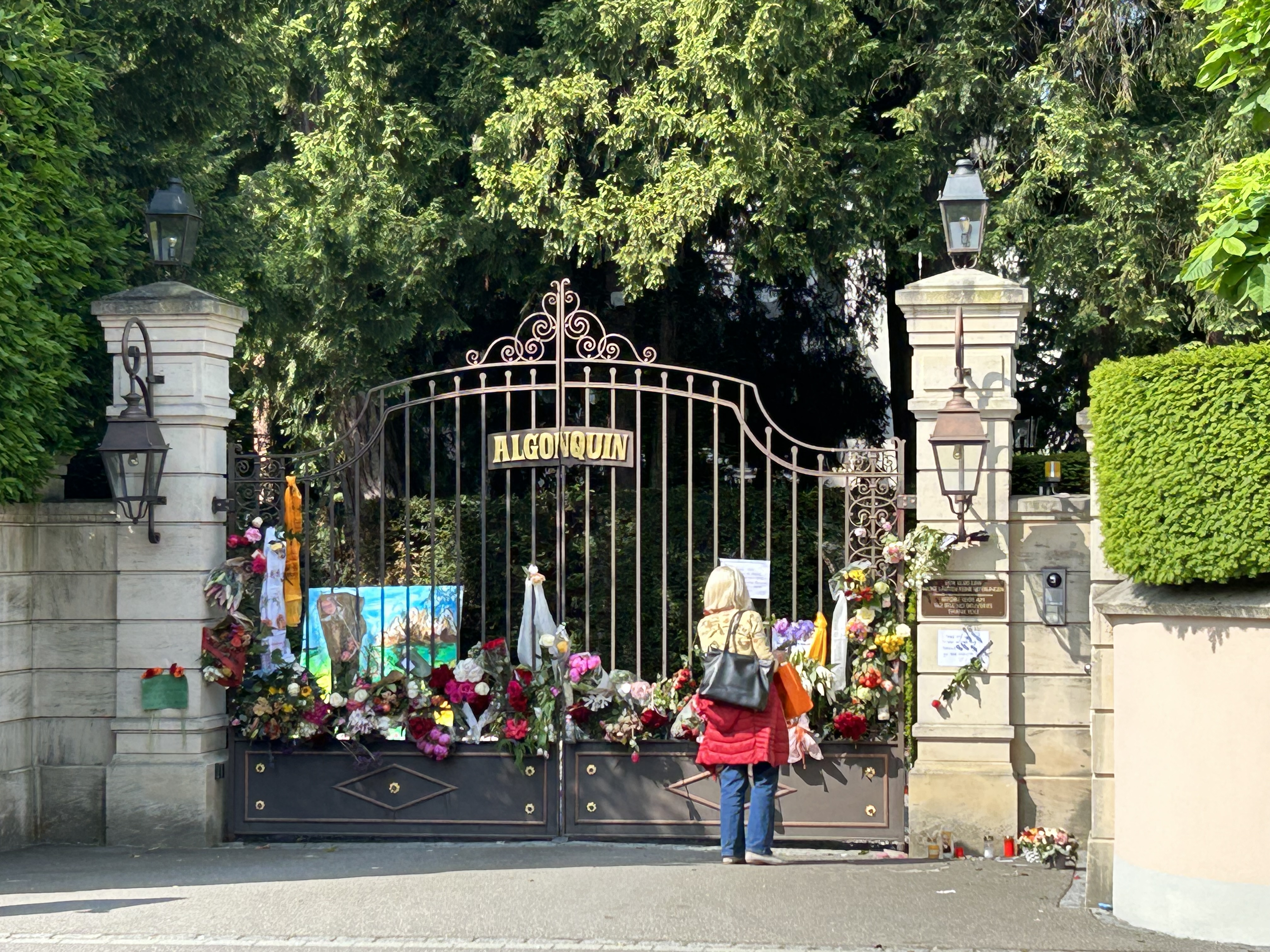
Turner's home, Villa Algonquin in Küsnacht, Switzerland, two days after her death

Turner began living at Château Algonquin in Küsnacht on the shore of Lake Zurich in 1994. She had previously owned property in Cologne, London, and Los Angeles, and a villa on the French Riviera named Anna Fleur.

In 2013, Turner applied for Swiss citizenship, stating she would renounce her citizenship in the United States. The stated reasons for the relinquishment were that she no longer had any strong connections to the United States and "has no plans to reside" there in the future. In April, she undertook a mandatory citizenship test which included advanced knowledge of German (the official language of the canton of Zurich) and of Swiss history. On April 22, 2013, she became a citizen of Switzerland and was issued a Swiss passport. Turner signed the paperwork to relinquish her American citizenship at the US embassy in Bern on October 24, 2013.

Turner's wealth was estimated at 225 million Swiss francs (about US$250 million) in 2022 by the Swiss business magazine Bilanz.

=== Illness and death ===
Turner revealed in her 2018 memoir My Love Story that she had multiple life-threatening illnesses. She had high blood pressure since 1978, which remained mostly untreated and resulted in damage to her kidneys and eventual kidney failure. In 2013, three weeks after her wedding to Erwin Bach, she had a stroke and needed to learn to walk again. In 2016, she was diagnosed with intestinal cancer. She attempted to treat her health problems with homeopathy, which worsened her condition.

Her chances of receiving a kidney transplant were considered low and she was urged to start dialysis. She signed up with an organization that facilitates assisted suicide (a procedure which is legal in Switzerland), becoming a member of Exit International. However, her husband offered to donate a kidney for transplant. She accepted his donation and had kidney transplantation surgery on April 7, 2017.

On May 24, 2023, Turner died at her home in Küsnacht, Switzerland, aged 83, following years of illness. Turner's body was cremated after a private funeral.

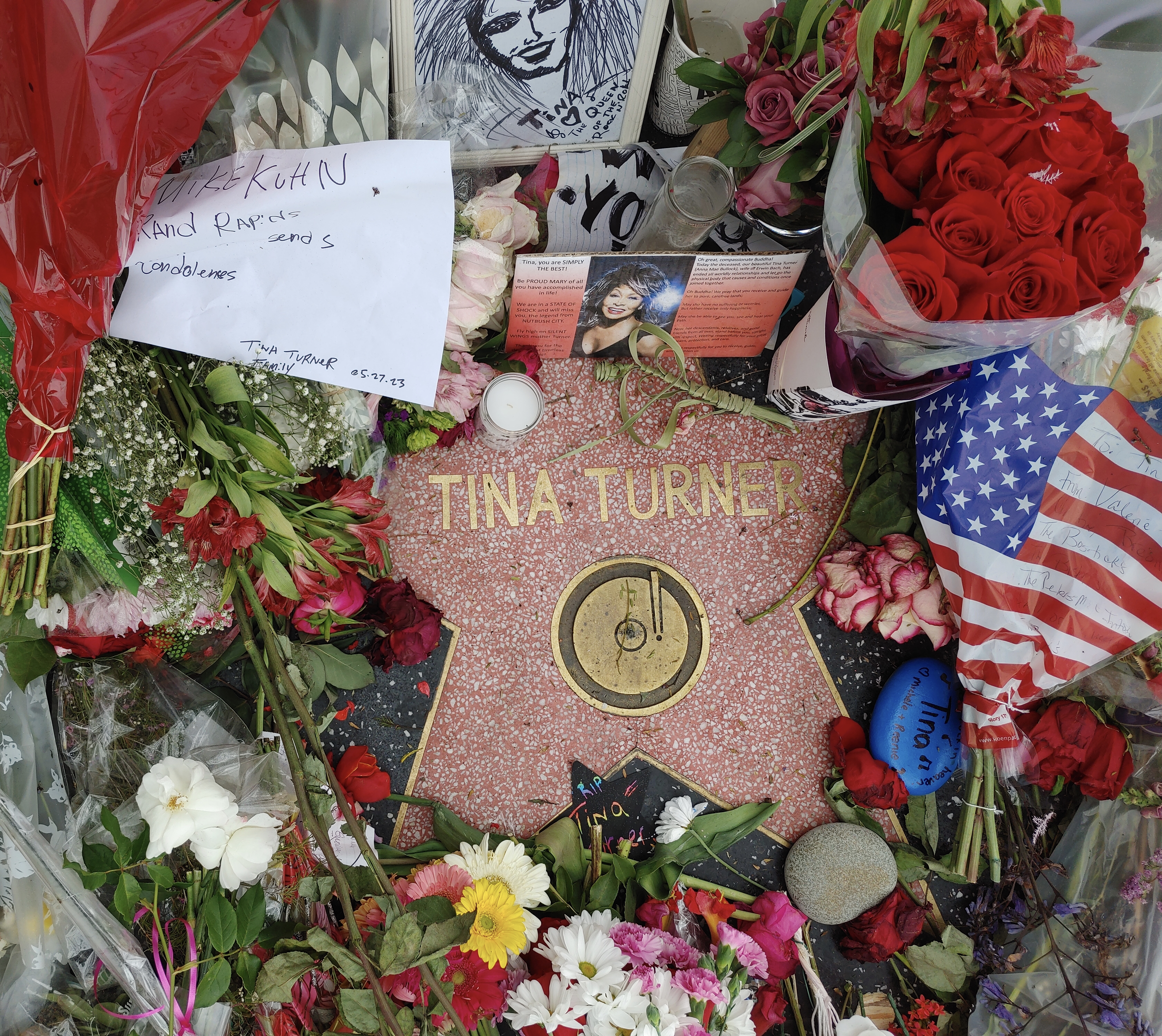
Turner's star on the Hollywood Walk of Fame covered with flowers and tributes from her fans on May 28, 2023

=== Tributes ===
Following news of her death, her star on the Hollywood Walk of Fame was covered with flowers from fans. Fans around the world paid respect with flowers and candles lit outside her home in Switzerland and outside London's Aldwych Theatre – the home of the musical Tina. On May 25, 2023, theatres across the West End of London, dimmed their lights for two minutes to mark Turner's death.

Many fellow artists mourned her loss. Those artists included Beyoncé, Dolly Parton, Debbie Harry, Jimmy Barnes, Bette Midler, Peter Andre, Bryan Adams, Lionel Richie, Elton John, Madonna, Rod Stewart, Lizzo, Brittany Howard, Mick Jagger, Keith Richards, Ronnie Wood and Cher.

Turner also received tributes by British model Naomi Campbell, as well as film and television figures such as Oprah Winfrey, Angela Bassett, Jenifer Lewis, Forest Whitaker, and theater producer Joop van den Ende. US president Joe Biden, as well as former presidents Barack Obama and Bill Clinton, and Swiss president Alain Berset also paid tribute to Turner through public statements. King Charles III paid tribute by allowing "The Best" to be performed during the changing of the guard.

Patti LaBelle paid tribute to Turner with a rendition of "The Best" at the 2023 BET Awards in June 2023. In February 2024, Fantasia paid tribute to Turner with a performance of "Proud Mary" at the 66th Annual Grammy Awards.

== Legacy and awards ==
Often referred to as "The Queen of Rock and Roll", Turner is considered one of the greatest singers of all time. An article in The Guardian in 2018 noted her "swagger, sensuality, gravelly vocals and unstoppable energy", while The New York Times in 1996 noted that she was known for the appearance of her legs. Journalist Kurt Loder asserted that Turner's voice combined "the emotional force of the great blues singers with a sheer, wallpaper-peeling power that seemed made to order for the age of amplification". Daphne A. Brooks, a scholar of African-American studies, wrote for The Guardian:

Turner merged sound and movement at a critical turning point in rock history, navigating and reflecting back the technological innovations of a new pop-music era in the 60s and 70s. She catapulted herself to the forefront of a musical revolution that had long marginalized and overlooked the pioneering contributions of African American women and then remade herself again at an age when most pop musicians were hitting the oldies circuit. Turner's musical character has always been a charged combination of mystery as well as light, melancholy mixed with a ferocious vitality that often flirted with danger.

=== Awards, honors and achievements ===
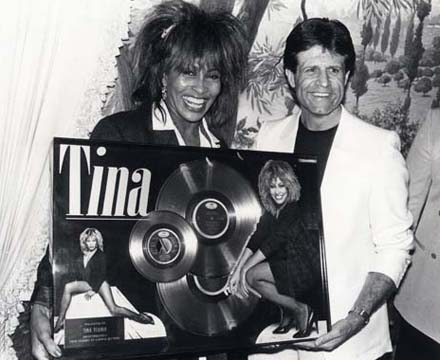
Turner holding certification plaques with Don Grierson

At one time, Turner held a Guinness World Record for the largest paying audience for a solo performer (180,000 in 1988). In the UK, Turner was the first artist to have a Top 40 hit in seven consecutive decades; she has a total of thirty-five UK Top 40 hits. Turner was ranked as one of the most successful female singles artist in German chart history. She sold over 100 million records worldwide, including certified RIAA album sales of 10 million.

Turner won a total of 12 Grammy Awards. These awards include eight competitive Grammy Awards; she shares the record (with Pat Benatar, and with Sheryl Crow) for most awards (four) given for Best Female Rock Vocal Performance. Three of her recordings--"River Deep – Mountain High" (1999), "Proud Mary" (2003), and "What's Love Got to Do with It" (2012)--appear in the Grammy Hall of Fame. Turner is the only female artist to have won a Grammy in the pop, rock, and R&B fields. Turner received a Grammy Lifetime Achievement Award in 2018. Turner also won Grammys as a member of USA for Africa and as a performer at the 1986 Prince's trust concert.

Turner received a star on the Hollywood Walk of Fame in 1986 and a star on the St. Louis Walk of Fame in 1991. She and Ike Turner were inducted into the Rock and Roll Hall of Fame as a duo in 1991.

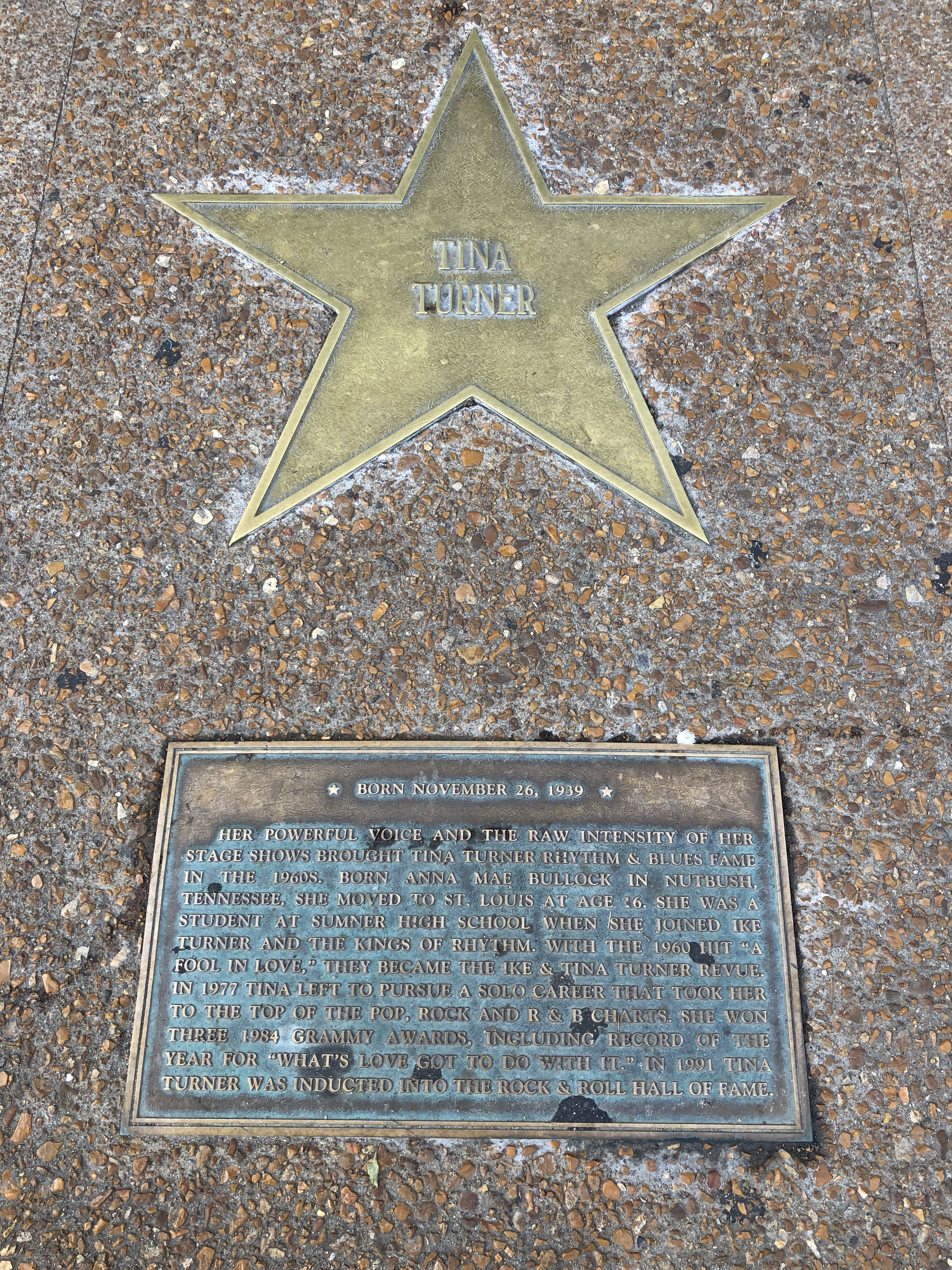
Tina Turner star on the St. Louis Walk of Fame in University City, Missouri

In 2005, Turner received the prestigious Kennedy Center Honors. President George W. Bush commented on her "natural skill, the energy and sensuality", and referred to her legs as "the most famous in show business". Several artists paid tribute to her that night including Melissa Etheridge (performing "River Deep – Mountain High"), Queen Latifah (performing "What's Love Got to Do with It"), Beyoncé (performing "Proud Mary"), and Al Green (performing "Let's Stay Together"). Oprah Winfrey stated, "We don't need another hero. We need more heroines like you, Tina. You make me proud to spell my name w-o-m-a-n."

In 2021, Turner was inducted by Angela Bassett into the Rock and Roll Hall of Fame as a solo artist. Keith Urban and H.E.R. performed "It's Only Love", Mickey Guyton performed "What's Love Got to Do with It", and Christina Aguilera performed "River Deep – Mountain High".

In September 2025, Turner was selected for induction into the National Rhythm and Blues Hall of Fame.

== Discography ==
=== Studio albums ===
- Tina Turns the Country On! (1974)
- Acid Queen (1975)
- Rough (1978)
- Love Explosion (1979)
- Private Dancer (1984)
- Break Every Rule (1986)
- Foreign Affair (1989)
- Wildest Dreams (1996)
- Twenty Four Seven (1999)

== Tours ==
- 1977: Australian Tour
- 1978: Tina Turner Revue
- 1979: Tina Turner Show
- 1981–1983: Tina Turner: Live in Concert
- 1984: 1984 World Tour
- 1985: Private Dancer Tour
- 1987–1988: Break Every Rule World Tour
- 1990: Foreign Affair: The Farewell Tour
- 1993: What's Love? Tour
- 1996–1997: Wildest Dreams Tour
- 2000: Twenty Four Seven Tour
- 2008–2009: Tina!: 50th Anniversary Tour

=== As opening act ===
- 1981: American Tour 1981 (for the Rolling Stones)
- 1981: Worth Leavin' Home For Tour (for Rod Stewart)
- 1984: Can't Slow Down Tour (for Lionel Richie)

== Filmography ==
Year	Film	Role	Notes
1965	The Big T.N.T. Show	Herself	Sequel to T.A.M.I. Show
1970	It's Your Thing	Herself	Documentary on the Isley Brothers concert at Yankee Stadium
1970	Gimme Shelter	Herself	Documentary on the Rolling Stones' 1969 American tour
1971	Soul to Soul	Herself	Documentary on the Independence Day concert in Ghana
1971	Taking Off	Herself	
1971	Good Vibrations from Central Park	Herself	
1975	Tommy	The Acid Queen	
1975	Ann-Margret Olsson	Herself	TV programme
1975	Poiret est à vous	Herself	TV variety show
1978	Sgt. Pepper's Lonely Hearts Club Band	Our Guests at Heartland	
1982	Chuck Berry: Live at the Roxy with Tina Turner	Herself	
1985	Mad Max Beyond Thunderdome	Aunty Entity	Won (1986) – NAACP Image Award for Outstanding Actress in a Motion Picture
1993	What's Love Got to Do with it	Herself	Singing voice for Angela Bassett, also archive footage
1993	Tina Turner: Girl From Nutbush	Herself	Documentary
1993	Last Action Hero	The Mayor	
2000	Ally McBeal	Herself	Episode: "The Oddball Parade"
2012	Ike & Tina on the Road: 1971–72	Herself	Documentary filmed by rock photographer Bob Gruen
2021	Tina	Herself	Documentary, final film role

== Bibliography ==
- I, Tina: My Life Story (1986)
- My Love Story: A Memoir (2018)
- Happiness Becomes You: A Guide to Changing Your Life for Good (2020)
- Tina Turner: That's My Life (2020)
