= Flagg Grove School =

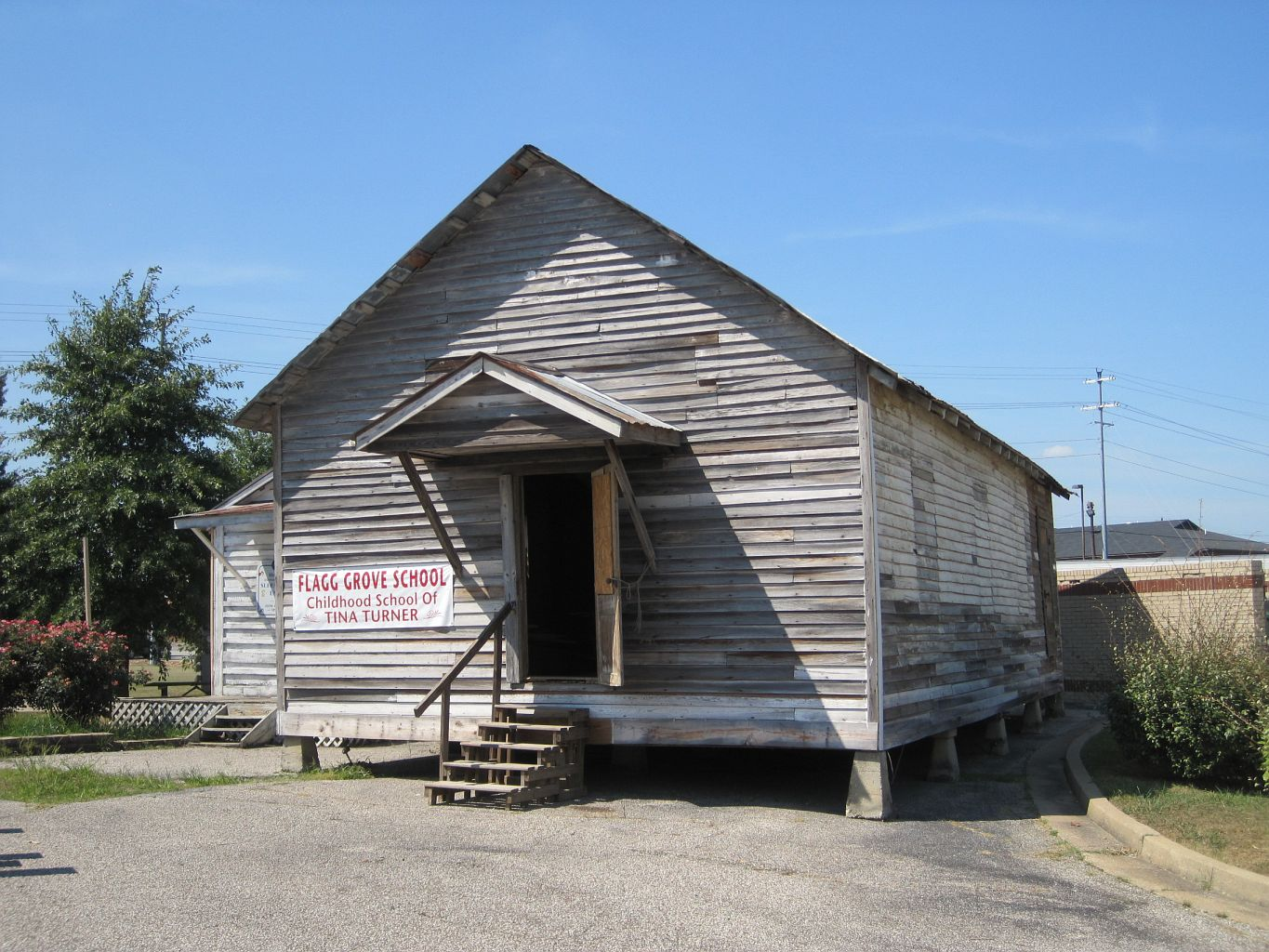
- Flagg Grove School in Brownsville, which now operates as the Tina Turner Museum.

Location
- Elm Tree Road; Haywood County, TN; 35°32′28″N 89°14′46″W

Information
- Type: Elementary School
- Established: 1889
- Website: http://www.westtnheritage.com/flagggrove.html

Flagg Grove School (or Flaggs' Grove School) was a school south of Nutbush in Haywood County, Tennessee, now part of Brownsville. The school was established in the late 19th century and now operates as the Tina Turner Museum.

== History ==
An area of 1-acre (4,000 m^{2}) of land for the school was sold to the school trustees for $25 in 1889 by Benjamin B. Flagg who was the older brother of singer Tina Turner's great grandfather, George Flagg. This was approximately one third the going rate for land at the time in Tennessee.

The school operated as a subscription school offering grades 1-8 until the mid-1960s.

Singer Tina Turner attended Flagg Grove Elementary School in the 1940s. Turner contributed to the restoration of the school and it was made into the Tina Turner Museum in her honor.
