= Happiness Becomes You =

2020 memoir by Tina Turner

- Author: Tina Turner
- Language: English
- Genres: Memoir; Philosophy
- Published: December 1, 2020
- Publisher: Atria Books (North America); HarperCollins (UK & Commonwealth); Droemer Knaur (Germany)
- Publication place: United States
- Media type: Hardcover; ebook; audiobook
- Pages: 240
- ISBN: 978-1-9821-5215-4 (Hardcover)

Happiness Becomes You: A Guide to Changing Your Life for Good is a memoir published by singer Tina Turner in 2020. It explores details of Turner's life including how she overcame obstacles to achieve happiness and success, and offers Turner's advice on how readers can realize their own dreams. She described the book as a parallel behind-the-scenes story to the HBO documentary film Tina (2021).

== Synopsis ==
In the book, Turner provides inspirational advice and spiritual tools for the reader's self-empowerment and fulfillment, and she shares how her favorite Buddhist principles helped her overcome poverty, prejudice, illness, loss, and other personal and professional challenges.

== Reception ==
The book received positive reviews from Publishers Weekly, Library Journal, and the San Francisco Chronicle, as well as a starred review from the American Library Association's Booklist.
