= List of people on the United States cover of Rolling Stone (1960s) =

This is a list of people (real or fictional) appearing on the cover of Rolling Stone magazine in the 1960s. This list is for the regular biweekly issues of the magazine and does not include special issues.

== 1967 ==
Issue number	Cover date	People on cover	Notes
1	November 9, 1967	John Lennon	
2	November 23, 1967	Tina Turner	Turner was the first black artist and first woman to be on the cover of Rolling Stone.
3	December 14, 1967	The Beatles (George Harrison, John Lennon, Paul McCartney, Ringo Starr)	The Beatles appear with unidentified members of the Magical Mystery Tour cast

== 1968 ==
Issue number	Cover date	People on cover	Notes
4	January 20, 1968	Donovan, Jimi Hendrix, Otis Redding	Various cover stories
5	February 10, 1968	Jim Morrison	
6	February 24, 1968	Janis Joplin	Rolling Stone Awards cover story; cover includes unidentified people from the Gathering of the Tribes be-in
7	March 9, 1968	Jimi Hendrix	
8	April 6, 1968	Lou Adler, John Phillips	
9	April 27, 1968	The Beatles (John Lennon, Paul McCartney)	
10	May 11, 1968	Eric Clapton	
11	May 25, 1968	Julianna Wolman	Cover story on rock fashion; Wolman is the wife of cover photographer Baron Wolman
12	June 22, 1968	Bob Dylan	
13	July 6, 1968	Tiny Tim	
14	July 20, 1968	Frank Zappa	
15	August 10, 1968	Mick Jagger	
16	August 24, 1968	The Band (Rick Danko, Levon Helm, Garth Hudson, Richard Manuel, Robbie Robertson)	
17	September 14, 1968	N/A	Zap Comix cover story
18	September 28, 1968	Pete Townshend	Townshend appears with unidentified man
19	October 12, 1968	Mick Jagger	
20	October 26, 1968	The Beatles (George Harrison, John Lennon, Paul McCartney, Ringo Starr)	
21	November 9, 1968	N/A	Cover story on drugs in the United States Army
22	November 23, 1968	John Lennon, Yoko Ono	
23	December 7, 1968	Doug Sahm	Sahm appears with his son, Sean
24	December 21, 1968	The Beatles (George Harrison, John Lennon, Paul McCartney, Ringo Starr)	The Beatles appear with McCartney's dog, Martha

== 1969 ==
Issue number	Cover date	People on cover	Notes
25	January 4, 1969	Robin Tyner	
26	February 1, 1969	Jimi Hendrix	
27	February 15, 1969	Karen Seltenrich	Groupies cover story
28	March 1, 1969	Kenji Sawada	Sawada appears with unidentified man
29	March 15, 1969	Janis Joplin	
30	April 5, 1969	N/A	"American Revolution 1969" cover story; cover includes unidentified cop and protester
31	April 19, 1969	Sun Ra	
32	May 3, 1969	Steve Winwood	
33	May 17, 1969	Joni Mitchell	
34	May 31, 1969	Jimi Hendrix	Hendrix appears with unidentified people
35	June 14, 1969	Chuck Berry	
36	June 28, 1969	Nudie Cohn	
37	July 12, 1969	Elvis Presley	
38	July 26, 1969	Jim Morrison	
39	August 9, 1969	Brian Jones	
40	August 23, 1969	Jerry Garcia	
41	September 6, 1969	Joe Cocker	
42	September 20, 1969	N/A	Woodstock cover story; cover includes unidentified man and boy
43	October 4, 1969	N/A	Underground press cover story; cover includes unidentified man
44	October 18, 1969	David Crosby	
45	November 1, 1969	Tina Turner	
46	November 15, 1969	The Beatles (George Harrison, John Lennon, Paul McCartney, Ringo Starr)	
47	November 29, 1969	Bob Dylan	
48	December 13, 1969	Miles Davis	
49	December 27, 1969	Mick Jagger	

== Sources ==
- Rolling Stone Coverwall 1967–2013
- Rolling Stone: 1,000 Covers: A History of the Most Influential Magazine in Pop Culture, New York, NY: Abrams, 2006. ISBN 0-8109-5865-1
