= Dechen Shak-Dagsay =

Swiss singer of traditional Tibetan mantras

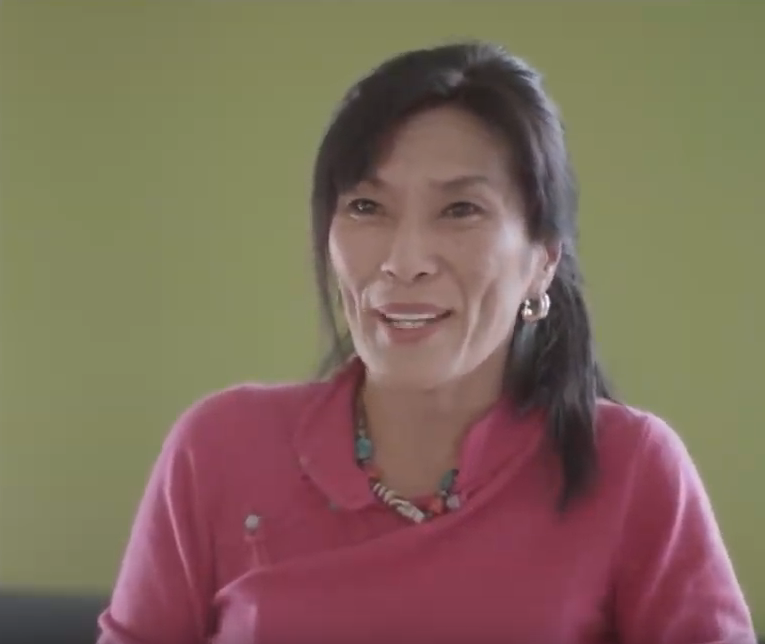
Dechen Shak-Dagsay

Dechen Shak-Dagsay is a modern musician of traditional Tibetan Buddhist mantras expressed in recent lyrical contexts.

== Life ==
Shak-Dagsay was born in Kathmandu, Nepal in 1959. When she was 4 years old, Shak-Dagsay's family moved to Switzerland, where she grew up. She is the eldest daughter of Dagsay Tulku Rinpoche, a Tibetan Lama.

Shak-Dagsay describes herself as committed to "preserving Tibetan culture in the West", having studied and performed traditional Tibetan music and dance throughout her childhood and adolescence.

She has performed songs from her albums "Jewel" and "Day Tomorrow" at Carnegie Hall in New York CIty for the Tibet House Benefit Concert. She has also performed at the Kee Club in Hong Kong.

She is also the founder of the Dewa Che charity organization, which engages in social projects in Tibet, and a co-founder of the Beyond interfaith music projects based in Switzerland.

== Albums ==
- Jewel (2012)
- Asian Jewel (2014)
- Day Tomorrow (2015)
- emaho – The Story of Arya Tara (2021)

Shak-Dagsay is also featured on the Beyond albums with Tina Turner, Regula Curti, and Sawani Shende-Sathaye.
