= Tina Turner discography =

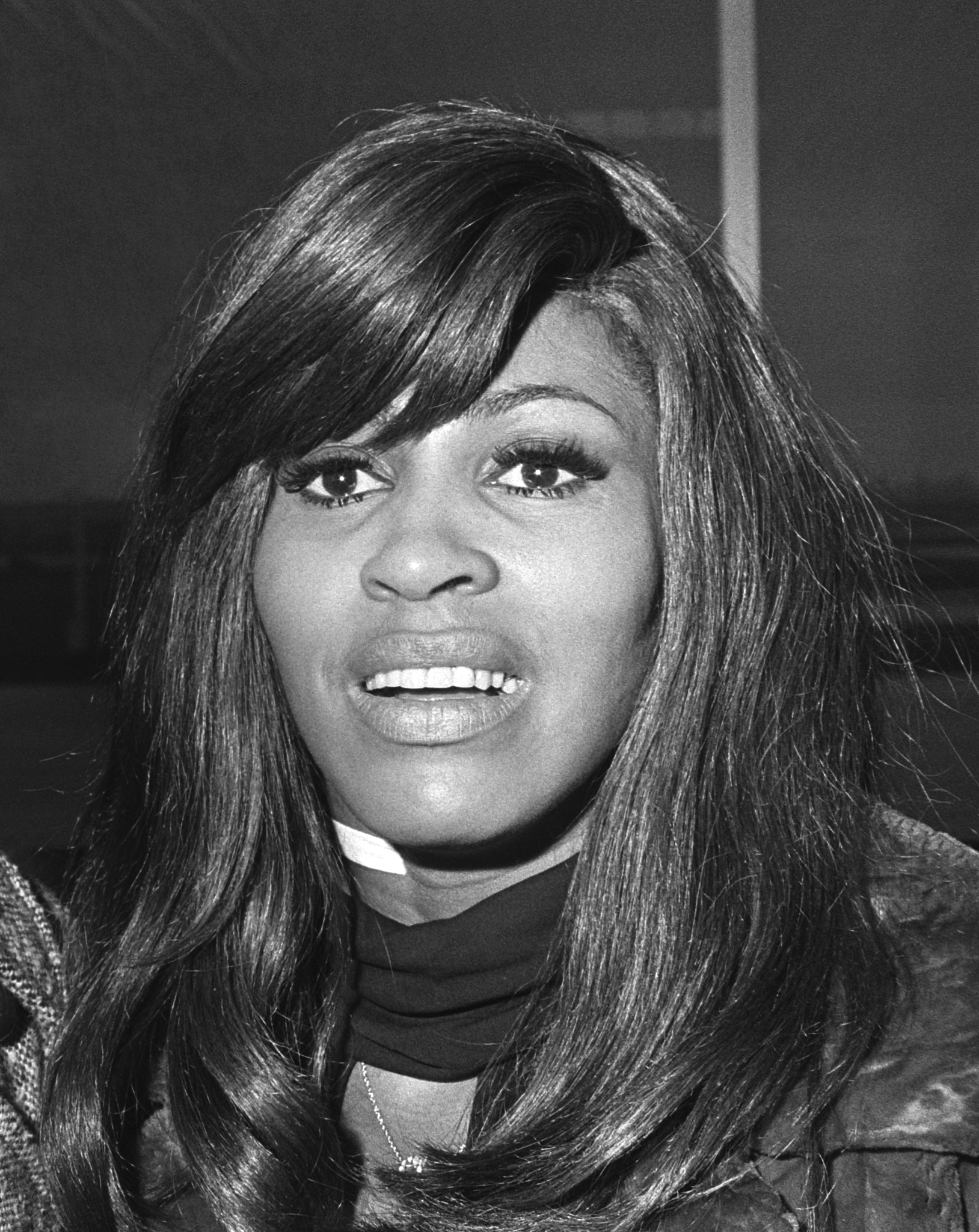
- Turner in 1971
- Studio albums: 9
- Live albums: 2
- Compilation albums: 7
- Singles: 72
- Video albums: 18
- Music videos: 47

Singer Tina Turner released nine studio albums, two live albums, two soundtracks, and seven compilation albums. Widely referred to as the "Queen of Rock 'n' Roll", Turner had reportedly sold around 100 to 150 million records worldwide (with claims as high as 200 million globally), making her one of the best-selling female artists in music history. According to Recording Industry Association of America, Turner has certified sales of 10 million albums in the US, alone.

Turner's career spanned over five decades beginning with her first recording "Boxtop" in 1958 and formally retired in 2009 after her "Tina! 50th Anniversary Tour". Rolling Stone ranked her as the 17th Greatest Singer of all time and 63rd Greatest Artist of all time. She was the first artist to have a top 40 hit in seven consecutive decades in the UK. Private Dancer remains her career's biggest seller with 12 million copies sold worldwide. Simply the Best is the 18th best-selling album by a woman in the United Kingdom, selling over 7 million copies worldwide. Turner is also among the best-selling female artists in the UK (9.6 million) and Germany (6.3 million).

== Synopsis ==
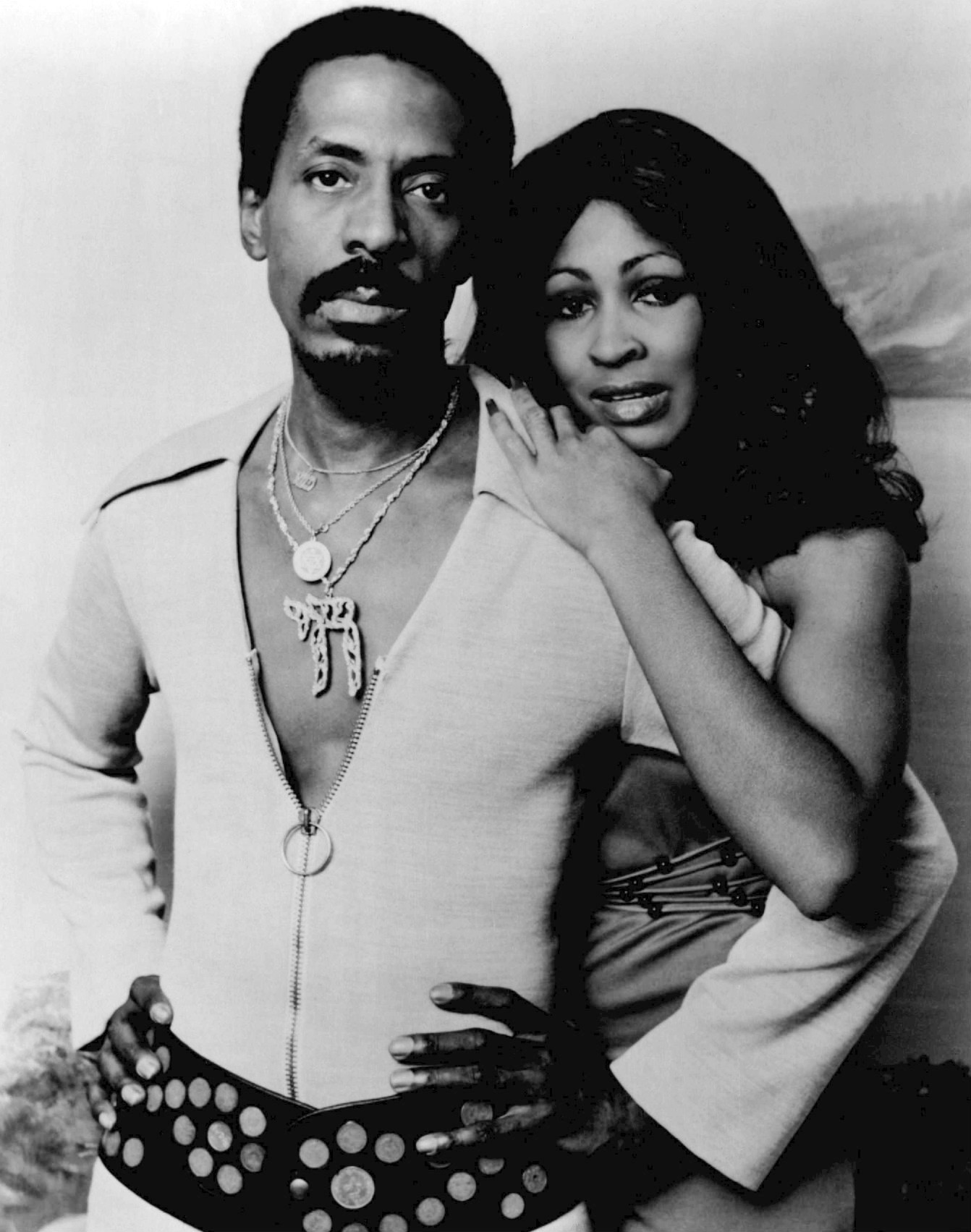
Ike & Tina Turner in 1974

After joining Ike Turner's band as a background vocalist, the pair formed the duo, Ike & Tina Turner in 1960 and married in 1962. They released a series of major hits on the Billboard Hot 100 and R&B charts, including "A Fool in Love", "Proud Mary", and "Nutbush City Limits". Tina Turner's first credited single as a solo artist, "Too Many Ties That Bind" was released from Ike Turner's Sonja Records label in 1964. Ike & Tina Turner remained intact until 1976 when their musical partnership ended, subsequently divorcing in 1978.

By this time, Tina Turner had already released two solo albums, Tina Turns the Country On (1974) and Acid Queen (1975), on United Artists Records to which she and Ike Turner were signed. She then continued as a solo artist with the albums Rough (1978) and Love Explosion (1979). However, none of these releases were commercially successful, and Turner left the label at the end of the decade. After collaborating with the British electronic group, B.E.F. in 1982, Turner signed a new contract with EMI Records in the UK, and released the single "Let's Stay Together" (a cover of the Al Green song) in late 1983. Produced by B.E.F., the single was a UK Top 10 hit. Import copies began to sell well in the US which prompted Capitol Records (a subsidiary of EMI) to sign Turner and release the single there themselves, which made the Billboard Top 30 in Spring 1984. By this time, Turner had begun work on a full album, Private Dancer, which was released in May 1984 and became a worldwide hit. It spawned a string of hit singles, including "What's Love Got to Do with It", which still stands as Turner's biggest hit, peaking at No. 1 on the Billboard Hot 100 for three weeks. The success of the album established Turner as a major solo artist earning her a comeback that is widely regarded as one of the most successful of all time.

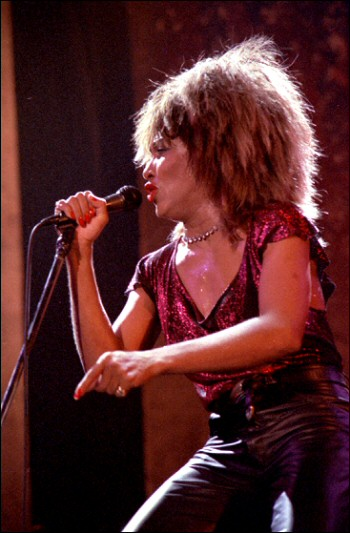
Turner in 1985

Following her success in 1984, Turner co-starred with Mel Gibson in the 1985 film, Mad Max Beyond Thunderdome. She recorded two songs for the film's soundtrack, with "We Don't Need Another Hero (Thunderdome)" giving her another huge international hit. She then released her second album for Capitol in 1986, Break Every Rule, which also spawned major hits on the US Hot 100, including "Typical Male" (No. 2) and "What You Get Is What You See" (No. 13). Turner embarked on a large scale world tour in 1987, and released her first live album, Tina Live in Europe, in 1988. She returned with her next studio album, Foreign Affair, in 1989. Its lead single, "The Best" was a worldwide hit that year and the album sold over 1.5 million copies in the United Kingdom alone.

Her first compilation album, Simply the Best, was released in 1991 and was another huge seller in the UK, selling over 2.4 million copies. Turner switched from the US Capitol label to Virgin Records (both were subsidiaries of EMI, and would later be merged by EMI to become the Capitol Music Group in 2007). In 1993, she recorded the soundtrack to the film about her life, What's Love Got to Do with It, producing the hit single, "I Don't Wanna Fight", her first US Top 10 hit since 1986. In 1995, she performed the title song for the James Bond film GoldenEye. Her next studio album was 1996's Wildest Dreams, followed by 1999's Twenty Four Seven, her last studio album.

On July 16, 2020, Turner released Foreign Affair: Deluxe Edition, which is a reissue of the original 1989 album and includes the original LP, a 1990 concert performance, B-sides, remixes, and various other content. On November 25, 2022, Turner released Break Every Rule: Deluxe Edition, which is a reissue of the original 1986 album and features remixes, B-sides, rarities, a live performance from Rio in 1988, and an intimate performance at Camden Palace. It would be the last release in her lifetime: she died on May 23, 2023.

== Albums ==
=== Studio albums ===
List of studio albums, with selected details, chart positions and certifications
Title	Album details	Peak chart positions										Certifications
Title	Album details	US	US R&B	AUS	AUT	CAN	FRA	GER	NED	SWI	UK	Certifications
Tina Turns the Country On!	Released: September 1974; Label: United Artists, EMI, Parlophone, Liberty, Legasy, Rhino; Formats: Cassette, LP	—	—	—	—	—	—	—	—	—	—	
Acid Queen	Released: August 1975; Label: United Artists/EMI/Capitol; Formats: Cassette, LP	155	39	75	—	—	—	—	—	—	—	
Rough	Released: September 1978; Label: United Artists/EMI/Ariola; Formats: Cassette, LP	—	—	—	—	—	—	—	—	—	—	
Love Explosion	Released: November 1979; Label: United Artists/EMI/Ariola; Formats: Cassette, LP	—	—	—	—	—	—	—	—	—	—	
Private Dancer	Released: May 29, 1984; Label: Capitol, EMI, Parlophone; Formats: Cassette, CD, LP	3	1	7	1	1	—	2	3	3	2	US: 5× Platinum; AUS: Platinum; CAN: 7× Platinum; GER: 5× Gold; NED: Platinum; UK: 3× Platinum
Break Every Rule	Released: September 8, 1986; Label: Capitol, EMI, Columbia, Parlophone; Formats: Cassette, CD, LP	4	7	11	2	3	—	1	2	1	2	US: Platinum; AUT: 2× Platinum; CAN: 2× Platinum; GER: 2× Platinum; NED: Gold; UK: Platinum
Foreign Affair	Released: September 18, 1989; Label: Capitol. EMI, Parlophone; Formats: Cassette, CD, LP	31	83	15	1	12	—	1	6	1	1	US: Gold; AUS: Platinum; AUT: 3× Platinum; CAN: Platinum; GER: 2× Platinum; NED: Platinum; SWI: 4× Platinum; UK: 5× Platinum
Wildest Dreams	Released: April 1, 1996; Label: Virgin, Parlophone. EMI; Formats: Cassette, CD, LP	61	26	14	2	29	14	2	4	1	4	AUT: Platinum; CAN: Gold; GER: Platinum; NED: Platinum; SWI: Platinum; UK: 2× Platinum
Twenty Four Seven	Released: October 28, 1999; Label: Virgin, Parlophone. EMI; Formats: Cassette, CD	21	29	194	5	9	23	3	24	1	9	US: Gold; AUT: Gold; CAN: Gold; GER: 3× Gold; SWI: Platinum; UK: Platinum
"—" denotes releases that did not chart or was not released.

=== Compilation albums ===
List of compilation albums, with selected details, chart positions and certifications
Title	Album details	Peak chart positions									Certifications
Title	Album details	US	US R&B	AUS	AUT	CAN	GER	NED	SWI	UK	Certifications
Good Hearted Woman	Released: 1974; Label: —; Formats: LP	—	—	—	—	—	—	—	—	—	—
Simply the Best	Released: October 22, 1991; Label: Capitol; Formats: Cassette, CD, LP	113	99	12	8	40	4	3	3	2	US: Platinum; AUS: 3× Platinum; AUT: 2× Platinum; CAN: Gold; GER: 3× Gold; NED: Platinum; SWI: 2× Platinum; UK: 8× Platinum
What's Love Got to Do with It	Released: June 15, 1993; Label: Parlophone/Virgin/EMI; Formats: Cassette, CD, LP	17	8	30	6	5	8	12	5	1	US: Platinum; AUT: Gold; CAN: Gold; GER: Gold; SWI: Platinum; UK: Platinum
All the Best	Released: November 2004; Label: Parlophone; Formats: CD, digital download	2	12	17	3	4	5	7	3	6 (Note: All the Best charted again in 2018 in the UK under the title The Greatest Hits, peaking at number 48)	US: Platinum; AUT: Platinum; CAN: Platinum; GER: 3× Gold; NED: Gold; SWI: Platinum; UK: Platinum
Tina! / The Platinum Collection	Released: September 30, 2008; Label: Capitol; Formats: CD, digital download	61	28	58	13	49	22	9	16	14	UK: Gold
Love Songs	Released: February 3, 2014; Label: Rhino; Formats: CD, digital download	—	—	—	—	—	56	—	30	30	
Queen of Rock 'n' Roll	Released: November 24, 2023; Label: Parlophone; Formats: 3×CD, 5×LP, digital download	—	—	—	14	—	15	—	7	16	UK: Gold
"—" denotes releases that did not chart or was not released.

=== Live albums ===
List of live albums, with selected details, chart positions and certifications
Title	Album details	Peak chart positions										Certifications
Title	Album details	US	US R&B	AUS	AUT	CAN	FRA	GER	NED	SWI	UK	Certifications
Tina Live in Europe	Released: March 21, 1988; Label: Capitol; Formats: Cassette, CD, LP	86	—	37	4	34	—	4	3	3	8	AUT: Platinum; GER: Gold; NED: Platinum; UK: Gold
Tina Live	Released: September 28, 2009; Label: Parlophone; Formats: CD, DVD	169	80	—	8	—	93	18	3	45	43	
"—" denotes releases that did not chart or was not released.

=== Limited releases ===
Title	Album details	Peak chart positions										Certifications
Title	Album details	US	US R&B	AUS	AUT	CAN	FRA	GER	NED	SWI	UK	Certifications
Music Keeps Me Dancin''	Released: May 12, 1979; Label: United Artists; Formats: LP, cassette	—	—	—	—	—	—	—	—	—	—	
The Legend Of Tina Turner	Released: August 8, 1985; Label: Capitol; Formats: LP, cassette, CD	—	—	—	—	—	—	—	—	—	—	
Private Dance Mixes	Released: September 15, 1985; Label: Capitol; Formats: LP, cassette	—	—	—	—	—	—	—	—	—	—	
Typikal Tina	Released: November 3, 1985; Label: Capitol; Formats: LP, cassette	—	—	—	—	—	—	—	—	—	—	
Star Festival (Private Tina)	Released: February 20, 1986; Label: Capitol; Formats: LP, cassette	—	—	—	—	—	—	—	—	—	—	
Tina Live	Released: June 10, 1987; Label: Capitol; Formats: CD, cassette, LP	—	—	—	—	—	—	—	—	—	—	
Tina Live II	Released: September 25, 1988; Label: Capitol; Formats: CD, cassette, LP	—	—	—	—	—	—	—	—	—	—	
Tina Turner On Fire! : The Best Of Tina Live	Released: March 15, 1993; Label: Parlophone; Formats: CD	—	—	—	—	—	—	—	—	—	—	
The Collected Recordings (Sixties To Nineties)	Released: July 5, 1994; Label: Parlophone; Formats: CD box set	—	—	—	—	—	—	—	—	—	—	
Greatest Hits	Released: October 12, 1994; Label: Parlophone; Formats: CD, cassette	—	—	—	—	—	—	—	—	—	—	
All That Glitters	Released: March 28, 2000; Label: EMI / Capitol; Formats: CD, digital download	—	—	—	—	—	—	—	—	—	—	
"—" denotes releases that did not chart or were not released.

== Singles ==
=== 1960s ===
List of singles released in the 1960s, showing year released, label and album name
Title	Year	Label	Album
"Too Many Ties That Bind"	1964	Sonja	Airwaves
"You Got What You Wanted" (with Ike Turner & The Kings of Rhythm)	1968	Pompeii	Cussin', Cryin' & Carryin' On

=== 1970s ===
List of singles released in the 1970s, showing year released, selected chart positions and album name
Title	Year	Peak chart positions						Album
Title	Year	US	US R&B	AUS	BEL	NED	UK	Album
"Baby, Get It On" (with Ike Turner)	1975	80	31	—	20	9	53	Acid Queen
"Whole Lotta Love"	1975	—	61	—	—	—	—	Acid Queen
"Acid Queen"	1976	—	—	—	—	—	—	Acid Queen
"Under My Thumb"	1977	—	—	80	—	—	—	Acid Queen
"Viva La Money"	1978	—	—	—	—	—	—	Rough
"Root, Toot, Undisputable Rock 'n Roller"	1978	—	—	—	—	—	—	Rough
"Sometimes When We Touch"	1979	—	—	—	—	—	—	Rough
"Fruits of the Night"	1979	—	—	—	—	—	—	Rough
"Love Explosion"	1979	—	—	—	—	—	—	Love Explosion
"Music Keeps Me Dancin'"	1979	—	—	—	—	—	—	Love Explosion
"—" denotes a title that did not chart, or was not released in that territory.

=== 1980s ===
List of singles released in the 1980s, showing year released, selected chart positions, certifications and album name
Title	Year	Peak chart positions										Certifications	Album
Title	Year	US	AUS	AUT	BEL	CAN	FRA	GER	NED	SWI	UK	Certifications	Album
"Let's Stay Together"	1983	26	19	—	7	43	—	18	4	28	6	UK: Silver	Private Dancer
"Help!"	1984	—	—	—	25	—	—	—	14	—	40		Private Dancer
"What's Love Got to Do with It"	1984	1	1	4	20	1	21	7	10	8	3	US: Gold; CAN: Platinum; UK: 2× Platinum	Private Dancer
"Better Be Good to Me"	1984	5	28	—	33	6	—	52	22	—	45	CAN: Gold	Private Dancer
"Private Dancer"	1984	7	21	—	5	11	—	20	4	—	26	UK: Silver	Private Dancer
"I Can't Stand the Rain"	1985	—	—	6	—	—	—	9	—	15	57		Private Dancer
"Show Some Respect"	1985	37	—	—	—	42	—	—	—	—	—		Private Dancer
"We Don't Need Another Hero (Thunderdome)"	1985	2	1	2	3	1	3	1	7	1	3	CAN: Gold; GER: Gold; UK: Gold	Mad Max Beyond Thunderdome: Original Motion Picture Soundtrack
"One of the Living"	1985	15	34	12	7	18	—	6	10	9	55		Mad Max Beyond Thunderdome: Original Motion Picture Soundtrack
"Typical Male"	1986	2	20	6	17	11	31	3	8	2	33		Break Every Rule
"Two People"	1986	30	—	19	28	53	—	10	20	10	43		Break Every Rule
"Girls"	1987	—	—	—	—	—	—	—	16	—	—		Break Every Rule
"What You Get Is What You See"	1987	13	15	23	38	23	—	17	—	—	30		Break Every Rule
"Break Every Rule"	1987	74	60	21	—	—	—	38	—	—	43		Break Every Rule
"Back Where You Started"	1987	—	—	—	—	85	—	—	—	—	—		Break Every Rule
"Paradise Is Here"	1987	—	—	25	—	—	—	31	—	—	78		Break Every Rule
"Afterglow"	1987	—	—	—	—	—	—	—	—	—	—		Break Every Rule
"Nutbush City Limits (Live)"	1988	—	—	—	—	—	—	45	—	—	—		Tina Live in Europe
"Addicted to Love (Live)"	1988	—	—	—	23	—	—	—	19	—	71		Tina Live in Europe
"Tonight (Live)" (with David Bowie)	1988	—	—	—	3	—	—	39	1	17	—	NED: Gold	Tina Live in Europe
"A Change Is Gonna Come (Live)"	1988	—	—	—	—	—	—	—	—	—	—		Tina Live in Europe
"634-5789 (Live)" (with Robert Cray)	1989	—	—	—	25	—	—	—	14	—	—		Tina Live in Europe
"The Best"	1989	15	4	2	2	3	23	4	5	3	5	AUS: Platinum; UK: 3× Platinum	Foreign Affair
"I Don't Wanna Lose You"	1989	—	59	20	9	—	—	38	24	30	8		Foreign Affair
"Steamy Windows"	1989	39	34	18	5	25	—	29	16	14	13		Foreign Affair
"—" denotes a title that did not chart, or was not released in that territory.

=== 1990s ===
List of singles released in the 1990s, showing year released, selected chart positions, certifications and album name
Title	Year	Peak chart positions										Certifications	Album
Title	Year	US	AUS	AUT	BEL	CAN	FRA	GER	NED	SWI	UK	Certifications	Album
"Look Me in the Heart"	1990	—	111	—	—	28	44	—	—	—	31		Foreign Affair
"Foreign Affair"	1990	—	—	—	49	—	—	35	55	—	—		Foreign Affair
"Be Tender with Me Baby"	1990	—	—	—	—	—	—	—	35	—	28		Foreign Affair
"Nutbush City Limits (The 90s Version)"	1991	—	16	25	12	—	—	25	11	12	23		Simply the Best
"Way of the World"	1991	—	117	12	16	70	25	33	15	29	13		Simply the Best
"Love Thing"	1991	—	62	—	—	33	—	67	36	—	29		Simply the Best
"I Want You Near Me"	1992	—	—	—	—	—	—	53	—	—	22		Simply the Best
"(Simply) The Best" (with Jimmy Barnes)	1992	—	14	—	—	—	—	—	—	—	—		Simply the Best
"I Don't Wanna Fight"	1993	9	39	29	8	1	49	35	14	11	7		What's Love Got to Do with It
"Disco Inferno"	1993	—	56	—	10	—	—	—	16	—	12		What's Love Got to Do with It
"Why Must We Wait Until Tonight"	1993	97	153	—	49	22	—	55	—	—	16		What's Love Got to Do with It
"Proud Mary"	1993	—	—	—	—	—	—	—	—	—	44	UK: Platinum	What's Love Got to Do with It
"GoldenEye"	1995	— (Note: "GoldenEye" did not enter the Billboard Hot 100, but peaked at number 2 on the Bubbling Under Hot 100 Singles chart.)	63	5	6	43	3	8	14	3	10	GER: Gold; SWI: Gold; UK: Silver	Wildest Dreams
"Whatever You Want"	1996	—	94	27	26	—	—	53	18	18	23		Wildest Dreams
"On Silent Wings" (with Sting)	1996	—	158	30	36	—	—	55	37	—	13		Wildest Dreams
"Missing You"	1996	84	130	—	— (Note: "Missing You" did not enter the Ultratop 50 Singles, but peaked at number 3 on the Ultratip chart.)	23	—	66	—	—	12		Wildest Dreams
"Something Beautiful Remains"	1996	—	—	—	— (Note: "Something Beautiful Remains" did not enter the Ultratop 50 Singles, but peaked at number 15 on the Ultratip chart.)	—	—	—	—	—	27		Wildest Dreams
"In Your Wildest Dreams" (with Barry White)	1996	— (Note: "In Your Wildest Dreams" did not enter the Billboard Hot 100, but peaked at number 1 on the Bubbling Under Hot 100 Singles chart.)	102	2	18	—	—	32	77	—	32		Wildest Dreams
"When the Heartache Is Over"	1999	—	120	22	17	27	49	23	18	17	10		Twenty Four Seven
"—" denotes a title that did not chart, or was not released in that territory.

=== 2000s–2020s ===
List of singles released from the 2000s to 2020s, showing year released, selected chart positions, certifications and album name
Title	Year	Peak chart positions								Certifications	Album
Title	Year	US Bub.	AUS	AUT	BEL	GER	NED	SWI	UK	Certifications	Album
"Whatever You Need"	2000	—	—	—	— (Note: "Whatever You Need" did not enter the Ultratop 50 Singles, but peaked at number 13 on the Ultratip chart.)	82	72	—	27		Twenty Four Seven
"Don't Leave Me This Way"	2000	—	—	—	—	78	—	—	—		Twenty Four Seven
"Open Arms"	2004	— (Note: "Open Arms" peaked at no. 70 on the Hot R&B Songs chart, but did not reach the Hot 100 or Bubbling Under charts.)	—	31	— (Note: "Open Arms" did not enter the Ultratop 50 Singles, but peaked at number 5 on the Ultratip chart.)	33	54	32	25		All the Best
"I'm Ready"	2008	—	—	—	— (Note: "I'm Ready" did not enter the Ultratop 50 Singles, but peaked at number 20 on the Ultratip chart.)	—	—	—	—		Tina!
"What's Love Got to Do with It" (with Kygo)	2020	1	95	23	39	26	59	6	31	AUT: Gold; CAN: Gold; GER: Gold; SWI: Gold; UK: Silver	Non-album single
"Something Beautiful" (2023 Version)	2023	—	—	—	—	—	—	—	—		Queen of Rock 'n' Roll
"—" denotes a title that did not chart, or was not released in that territory.

=== As featured artist ===
List of singles with Turner as a featured artist, showing year released, selected chart positions, certifications and album name
Title	Year	Peak chart positions										Certifications	Album
Title	Year	US	AUS	AUT	BEL	CAN	FRA	GER	NED	SWI	UK	Certifications	Album
"Boxtop" (with Ike Turner and Carlson Oliver)	1958	—	—	—	—	—	—	—	—	—	—		I Like Ike! The Best of Ike Turner
"Poor Little Fool" (with Fontella Bass)	1969	—	—	—	—	—	—	—	—	—	—		Cussin', Cryin' & Carryin' On
"Ball of Confusion (That's What the World Is Today)"	1982	—	—	—	—	—	—	—	—	—	—		B.E.F. Presents: Music of Quality and Distinction
"Shame, Shame, Shame" (with Ike Turner)	1982	—	—	—	—	—	—	—	47	—	—		The Edge
"Tonight" (with David Bowie)	1984	53	70	22	—	21	—	—	45	23	53		Tonight
"It's Only Love" (with Bryan Adams)	1985	15	57	30	22	14	—	44	20	16	29		Reckless
"Tearing Us Apart" (with Eric Clapton)	1987	—	—	—	34	—	—	—	29	—	56		August
"It Takes Two" (with Rod Stewart)	1990	—	16	15	6	—	—	22	3	10	5		Vagabond Heart
"Cose della vita" (with Eros Ramazzotti)	1997	—	—	10	8	—	6	4	4	7	—	SWI: Gold	Eros
"Teach Me Again" (with Elisa)	2006	—	—	65	—	—	—	43	—	41	—		All the Invisible Children
"—" denotes a title that did not chart, or was not released in that territory.

== Video albums ==
List of video albums, showing year released, selected details and certifications
Year	Video details	Certifications
1979	Wild Lady of Rock: Released: 1979; Label: PolyGram Video	
1982	Nice 'n' Rough: Released: 1982; Label: EMI/Thorn	
1984	Private Dancer – The Videos: Released: 1984; Label: Pioneer	
1985	Private Dancer Tour: Released: 1985; Label: Sony	
1986	What You See Is What You Get: Released: 1986; Label: Picture Music International	
1986	Break Every Rule: The Videos: Released: 1986; Label: HBO Cannon Video	
1988	Live in Rio '88: Released: 1988; Label: Polygram	AUS: Gold
1989	Foreign Affair – The Videos: Released: 1989; Label: Capitol	
1991	Do You Want Some Action? Live in Barcelona 1990: Released: 1991; Label: Polygram	
1991	Simply the Best: The Video Collection: Released: 1991; Label: Capitol	
1992	The Girl from Nutbush: Released: 1992; Label: Strand Home Video	
1993	What's Love...? Live: Released: September 22, 1993; Label: Picture	
1996	Live in Amsterdam – Wildest Dreams Tour: Released: September 16, 1997; Label: Fox Lorber	US: Gold; AUS: Platinum
1997	Behind the Dreams: Released: 1997; Label: unknown	
1999	Celebrate! – 60th Birthday Special: Released: November 21, 2000; Label: Image	AUS: Gold
2000	One Last Time Live in Concert: Released: February 6, 2001; Label: Eagle Vision USA	US: Platinum; AUS: Platinum; CAN: Platinum; GER: Gold
2005	All the Best – The Live Collection: Released: March 15, 2005; Label: Capitol	US: Gold; AUS: Platinum; GER: Gold
2009	Tina Live: Released: September 28, 2009; Label: Parlophone; Recorded: March 21, 2009, at the Gelredome, Netherlands	

== Music videos ==
List of music videos, showing year released and director name
Year	Song	Director
1982	"Ball of Confusion (That's What the World is Today)"	David Mallet
1983	"Let's Stay Together"	David Mallet
1984	"Help!"	unknown
1984	"What's Love Got to Do with It"	Mark Robinson
1984	"What's Love Got to Do with It" [black and white version]	Bud Schaetzle
1984	"Better Be Good to Me"	Brian Grant
1984	"Private Dancer"	Brian Grant
1985	"It's Only Love" [live] (Bryan Adams featuring Tina Turner)	David Mallet
1985	"Show Some Respect" [live]	David Mallet
1985	"We Don't Need Another Hero (Thunderdome)" [concept version]	George Miller
1985	"One of the Living"	unknown
1986	"Typical Male"	Brian Grant
1986	"Two People"	unknown
1987	"What You Get Is What You See"	Peter Care
1987	"Break Every Rule"	Andy Morahan
1987	"Paradise Is Here" [live]	Andy Morahan
1988	"Nutbush City Limits" [live in Rio de Janeiro]	unknown
1988	"Tonight" [live] (with David Bowie)	unknown
1988	"Addicted to Love" [live]	David Mallet
1989	"The Best"	Lol Creme
1989	"I Don't Wanna Lose You"	Dominic Sena
1989	"Steamy Windows"	Andy Morahan
1990	"Foreign Affair"	Paula Walker
1990	"Look Me in the Heart"	Paula Walker
1990	"Be Tender with Me Baby" [live at Woburn Abbey]	Nick Frye
1990	"It Takes Two" (with Rod Stewart)	David Hogan
1991	"Nutbush City Limits" (The 90s Version)	Michael Bay and Chris Cowey
1991	"Way of the World" [USA version]	Herb Ritts
1991	"Way of the World" [UK version]	Paula Walker
1992	"Love Thing"	Michael Bay
1992	"I Want You Near Me"	Paula Walker
1993	"I Don't Wanna Fight" [original version]	Peter Care
1993	"I Don't Wanna Fight" [movie version]	Peter Care
1993	"Why Must We Wait Until Tonight"	Peter Care
1993	"Disco Inferno"	unknown
1993	"Proud Mary" [live]	David Mallet
1995	"GoldenEye"	Jake Scott
1996	"Whatever You Want"	Stephane Sednaoui
1996	"On Silent Wings"	unknown
1996	"Missing You"	Peter Lindbergh
1996	"Something Beautiful Remains"	unknown
1996	"In Your Wildest Dreams"	unknown
1996	"In Your Wildest Dreams" [live]	David Mallet
1997	"Can't Stop Thinking of You" (with Eros Ramazzotti)	Nigel Dick
1999	"When the Heartache Is Over"	Paul Boyd
2000	"Whatever You Need"	Jake Nava
2006	"Teach Me Again" (with Elisa)	Stefano Veneruso

== Other appearances ==
Appearances by Turner on other artists' songs and albums
Year	Song	Album
1973	"I'm the Slime"	Over-Nite Sensation (uncredited)
1973	"Dirty Love"	Over-Nite Sensation (uncredited)
1973	"Zomby Woof"	Over-Nite Sensation (uncredited)
1973	"Dinah-Moe Humm"	Over-Nite Sensation (uncredited)
1973	"Montana"	Over-Nite Sensation (uncredited)
1974	"Cosmik Debris"	Apostrophe (') (uncredited)
1974	"Uncle Remus"	Apostrophe (') (uncredited)
1975	"Acid Queen"	Tommy soundtrack
1976	"Come Together"	All This and World War II
1982	"Johnny and Mary"	Summer Lovers soundtrack
1982	"Crazy in the Night"	Summer Lovers soundtrack
1984	"Lean On Me"	The Edge
1985	"Total Control"	We Are the World
1990	"Break Through the Barrier"	Days of Thunder soundtrack
1991	"The Bitch Is Back"	Two Rooms: Celebrating the Songs of Elton John & Bernie Taupin
1991	"A Change Is Gonna Come" (with B.E.F.)	Music of Quality and Distinction Volume Two
1993	"Shake a Tail Feather"	What's Love Got to Do with It soundtrack (non-US pressings)
1993	"Tina's Wish"	What's Love Got to Do with It soundtrack (non-US pressings)
1994	"What's Love Got to Do with It" (live)	Grammy's Greatest Moments Volume I
1997	"Row, Row, Row Your Boat"	Carnival!
1998	"Love Is a Beautiful Thing"	Wildest Dreams (Japanese bonus track) and Diana, Princess of Wales: Tribute
1998	"He Lives in You"	The Lion King II: Simba's Pride soundtrack
1999	"Easy as Life" (featuring Angelique Kidjo)	Elton John and Time Rice's Aida
2000	"Baby, I'm a Star"	All That Glitters
2003	"Great Spirits"	Brother Bear soundtrack
2007	"Edith and the Kingpin" (with Herbie Hancock)	River: The Joni Letters
2007	"The Game of Love"	Ultimate Santana
