= Break Every Rule World Tour =

1987–88 concert tour by Tina Turner

Break Every Rule Tour
- Tour by Tina Turner
- Location: Asia; Australia; Europe; North America; South America
- Associated album: Break Every Rule
- Start date: March 4, 1987
- End date: March 30, 1988
- Legs: 5
- No. of shows: 230
- Attendance: 4 million
- Box office: $60 million ($170.04 million in 2025 dollars)

Tina Turner concert chronology
- Private Dancer Tour (1985); Break Every Rule World Tour (1987–1988); Foreign Affair: The Farewell Tour (1990)

Break Every Rule World Tour is the sixth concert tour by singer Tina Turner. The tour supported her sixth solo album Break Every Rule (1986). It was sponsored by Pepsi-Cola and broke box office records in 13 different countries: United Kingdom, Germany, Netherlands, Switzerland, Belgium, Norway, Sweden, Spain, Italy, Austria, France, Ireland and Denmark. It was the third highest-grossing tour by a female artist in North America in 1987 and the highest-grossing female tour of the 1980s with a total of $11.3 million (for 78 shows in the United States). Her show in Rio de Janeiro remains the largest paying concert audience by a female artist with 180,000 spectators.

== Background ==
The tour was originally billed as Turner's "last tour". In an interview with Jet magazine, Turner stated,

It is my last tour for now. There probably won't be a tour with the next album because I want to devote some time to my movie career. But, I don't plan to retire.

The European tour kicked off on March 4, 1987, in front of a sold-out crowd of over 15,000 people at the Olympiahalle in Munich, Germany, a venue that she would later play 7 more times during the tour. During the first few shows, the tour went without Turner's signature hit "Proud Mary". Turner avoided the song because she had done it for so many years. It wasn't until her performance at the Rotterdam Ahoy that she tried the song in the set list. Turner stated, "The crowd erupted and sang the song for us. That's when I realized, 'We've got to put 'Mary' back in, she's still rolling on the river.'"

The most memorable and unusual moment for Turner was in Locarno, Switzerland. The stage for the concert had been built in the center of the town. As Turner recalls, "The stage was literally in the middle of the street surrounded by apartment buildings with parents and little kids sitting on their balconies in their night robes." Before her concerts at Johanneshov Isstadion in Sweden, Turner got a bad sinus infection and had to cancel her concerts. The arena was sold out and when the concert promoter went on stage to tell the audience, instead of booing the 13,000 people cheered with understanding. When Turner returned, she played to an even bigger audience. In her stadium concert in Ireland, Turner attracted a huge crowd of over 60,000 people. During this massive concert, Turner nearly stopped the show because of fans in the front getting crushed by other fans. The European tour ended on July 26, 1987, where it began in Munich, Germany. Turner recalls", Our biggest crowd came towards the end of the tour in Munich. We had already played eight indoor shows there to about 120,000 people and once I have been to a city, I'm always reluctant to go back soon afterward. [Then] we attracted another 100,000 people outdoors, I was really quite astounded. It felt like the Rolling Stones when they drew those huge crowds."

The tour proved to be most successful in Germany, where Turner played over 40 shows to 800,000 fans. Turner recalls that Germany has always been "special" to her. The European tour itself played to over 1.7 million people, more than any tour before it. The tour continued to break records in South America. Turner's performance at the Maracanã Stadium in Rio de Janeiro attracted over 180,000 spectators, one of the largest concert attendances in the 20th century, earning her a Guinness World Record.

== Broadcast and recordings ==

Her world record-breaking Break Every Rule Tour show of 1988 held in a single night at the Rio de Janeiro's Maracanã Stadium, was later released in video form on VHS and DVD called "Tina Live in Rio 88'". With this particular show alone, she entered the Guinness Book of World Records because she set the record of drawing 180,000 paying fans to a one-night show alone.

The VHS was released with the following thirteen songs:

1. "Addicted to Love"
2. "I Can't Stand the Rain"
3. "Typical Male"
4. "Better Be Good to Me"
5. "Private Dancer"
6. "We Don't Need Another Hero (Thunderdome)"
7. "What's Love Got to Do with It"
8. "Help"
9. "Let's Stay Together"
10. "Proud Mary"
11. "What You Get Is What You See"
12. "Break Every Rule"
13. "Paradise Is Here"

Additionally, a TV special recorded at the Camden Palace in London was released as "Break Every Rule starring Tina Turner". The songs included on that video album:

1. "We Got the Taste"
2. "Afterglow" (Music Video)
3. "Intro: Max Headroom"
4. "Back Where You Started"
5. "Break Every Rule"
6. "What You Get Is What You See"
7. "Overnight Sensation"
8. "A Change Is Gonna Come"
9. "Two People"
10. "Addicted to Love"
11. "In the Midnight Hour"
12. "634-5789"
13. "Land of 1,000 Dances"
14. "Paradise Is Here" (Music Video)
15. "Girls" (Music Video)

== Personnel ==
- James Ralston – guitar, vocals
- Laurie Wisefield – guitar
- Bob Feit – bass guitar, vocals
- Jack Bruno – drums
- Steve Scales – percussion
- John Miles – keyboards, guitar, vocals
- Don Snow – keyboards, saxophone, vocals
- Ollie Marland – keyboards, vocals
- Deric Dyer – saxophone, keyboards

== Opening act ==
- Level 42 (North America, select dates)
- Wang Chung (North America, select dates)
- Glass Tiger (West Germany, March 1987)
- Dragon (Stuttgart)
- Marshall Crenshaw (Tacoma, Vancouver, Calgary, Edmonton, Winnipeg)
- Go West (Cape Girardeau, Mursfreesboro)

== Setlist ==
Act I

1. "What You Get Is What You See"
2. "Break Every Rule"
3. "I Can't Stand the Rain"
4. "Typical Male"
5. "Acid Queen"

Act II

6. "Girls"
7. "Two People"
8. "Back Where You Started"
9. "Better Be Good to Me"

Act III

10. "Addicted to Love"
11. "Private Dancer"
12. "We Don't Need Another Hero (Thunderdome)"
13. "What's Love Got to Do with It"

Act IV

14. "Help"
15. "Let's Stay Together"

Act V

16. "Proud Mary"
17. "Show Some Respect"
18. "It's Only Love" (performed with John Miles)

Encore

19. "Nutbush City Limits"
20. "Paradise Is Here"

Notes

- "Proud Mary" was added to the setlist during the concert in Rotterdam. It is believed (and not confirmed) Turner performed "Land of a Thousand Dances".
- "Overnight Sensation" was only performed during shows in the UK.
- Turner performed "Tearing Us Apart" with Eric Clapton in London, on June 17, 1987
- During one of the shows in Osaka, Turner performed "Honky Tonk Women" with Mick Jagger

== Tour dates ==
Date	City	Country	Venue
Europe
March 4, 1987	Munich	West Germany	Olympiahalle
March 5, 1987	Munich	West Germany	Olympiahalle
March 6, 1987	Nuremberg	West Germany	Frankenhalle
March 7, 1987	Nuremberg	West Germany	Frankenhalle
March 8, 1987	West Berlin	West Germany	Deutschlandhalle
March 9, 1987	West Berlin	West Germany	Deutschlandhalle
March 10, 1987	West Berlin	West Germany	Deutschlandhalle
March 12, 1987	Frankfurt	West Germany	Festhalle
March 13, 1987	Frankfurt	West Germany	Festhalle
March 14, 1987	Frankfurt	West Germany	Festhalle
March 15, 1987	Frankfurt	West Germany	Festhalle
March 16, 1987	Frankfurt	West Germany	Festhalle
March 17, 1987	Hamburg	West Germany	Alsterdorfer Sporthalle
March 20, 1987	Stockholm	Sweden	Johanneshov Isstadion
March 21, 1987	Stockholm	Sweden	Johanneshov Isstadion
March 22, 1987	Gothenburg	Sweden	Scandinavium
March 29, 1987	Paris	France	Palais Omnisports de Paris-Bercy
March 30, 1987	Paris	France	Palais Omnisports de Paris-Bercy
March 31, 1987	Paris	France	Palais Omnisports de Paris-Bercy
April 1, 1987	Antwerp	Belgium	Sportpaleis
April 3, 1987	Rotterdam	Netherlands	Sportpaleis
April 4, 1987	Rotterdam	Netherlands	Sportpaleis
April 5, 1987	Rotterdam	Netherlands	Sportpaleis
April 6, 1987	Rotterdam	Netherlands	Sportpaleis
April 7, 1987	Oldenburg	West Germany	Weser-Ems Halle
April 9, 1987	Dortmund	West Germany	Westfalenhalle
April 10, 1987	Dortmund	West Germany	Westfalenhalle
April 11, 1987	Dortmund	West Germany	Westfalenhalle
April 12, 1987	Dortmund	West Germany	Westfalenhalle
April 14, 1987	Munich	West Germany	Olympiahalle
April 15, 1987	Munich	West Germany	Olympiahalle
April 16, 1987	Munich	West Germany	Olympiahalle
April 18, 1987	Munich	West Germany	Olympiahalle
April 19, 1987	Munich	West Germany	Olympiahalle
April 21, 1987	Zürich	Switzerland	Hallenstadion
April 22, 1987	Zürich	Switzerland	Hallenstadion
April 23, 1987	Zürich	Switzerland	Hallenstadion
April 24, 1987	Zürich	Switzerland	Hallenstadion
April 25, 1987	Zürich	Switzerland	Hallenstadion
April 28, 1987	Mannheim	West Germany	Eisstadion am Friedrichspark
April 29, 1987	Mannheim	West Germany	Eisstadion am Friedrichspark
April 30, 1987	Mannheim	West Germany	Eisstadion am Friedrichspark
May 1, 1987	Hanover	West Germany	Europahalle
May 2, 1987	Hanover	West Germany	Europahalle
May 4, 1987	Stuttgart	West Germany	Hanns-Martin-Schleyer-Halle
May 5, 1987	Stuttgart	West Germany	Hanns-Martin-Schleyer-Halle
May 6, 1987	Stuttgart	West Germany	Hanns-Martin-Schleyer-Halle
May 7, 1987	Stuttgart	West Germany	Hanns-Martin-Schleyer-Halle
May 9, 1987	Vienna	Austria	Wiener Stadthalle
May 10, 1987	Vienna	Austria	Wiener Stadthalle
May 11, 1987	Vienna	Austria	Wiener Stadthalle
May 17, 1987	Madrid	Spain	Rockódromo de la Casa de Campo
May 19, 1987	Valencia	Spain	Estadio Luis Casanova
May 21, 1987	Barcelona	Spain	Plaza de Toros Monumental
May 23, 1987	Verona	Italy	Arena di Verona
May 24, 1987	Verona	Italy	Arena di Verona
May 26, 1987	Montpellier	France	Zénith de Montpellier
May 27, 1987	Lyon	France	Palais des Sports de Gerland
May 28, 1987	Nijmegen	Netherlands	Goffertstadion
May 30, 1987	Dublin	Ireland	RDS Arena
June 1, 1987	Glasgow	Scotland	SECC Concert Hall 4
June 2, 1987	Glasgow	Scotland	SECC Concert Hall 4
June 3, 1987	Glasgow	Scotland	SECC Concert Hall 4
June 5, 1987	Birmingham	England	NEC Arena
June 6, 1987	Birmingham	England	NEC Arena
June 7, 1987	Birmingham	England	NEC Arena
June 8, 1987	Birmingham	England	NEC Arena
June 11, 1987	London	England	Wembley Arena
June 12, 1987	London	England	Wembley Arena
June 13, 1987	London	England	Wembley Arena
June 14, 1987	London	England	Wembley Arena
June 16, 1987	London	England	Wembley Arena
June 17, 1987	London	England	Wembley Arena
June 18, 1987	London	England	Wembley Arena
June 20, 1987	Oslo	Norway	Valle Hovin
June 21, 1987	Karlsruhe	West Germany	Wildparkstadion
June 24, 1987	Graz	Austria	Eisstadion Liebenau
June 27, 1987	Basel	Switzerland	St. Jakob Stadium
June 28, 1987	Munich	West Germany	Galopprennbahn Riem
June 30, 1987	Hanover	West Germany	Europahalle
July 2, 1987	West Berlin	West Germany	Waldbühne
July 3, 1987	Hamburg	West Germany	Volksparkstadion
July 4, 1987	Essen	West Germany	Georg-Melches-Stadion
July 5, 1987	Copenhagen	Denmark	Københavns Idrætspark
July 8, 1987	Locarno	Switzerland	Piazza Grande
July 9, 1987	Annecy-le-Vieux	France	Stade d'Albigny
July 11, 1987	Fréjus	France	Arènes de Fréjus
July 13, 1987	Nîmes	France	Arena of Nîmes
July 15, 1987	Dax	France	Parc Municipal des Sports Maurice-Boyau
July 16, 1987	Bilbao	Spain	Plaza de toros de Vista Alegre
July 18, 1987	Málaga	Spain	Estadio Municipal de Marbella
Asia
July 21, 1987	Tel Aviv	Israel	Yarkon Park
July 22, 1987	Tel Aviv	Israel	Yarkon Park
Europe
July 24, 1987	Ostend	Belgium	Luchthaven Oostende
July 25, 1987	Nürburg	West Germany	Nürburgring
July 26, 1987	Gießen	West Germany	Waldstadion
North America
August 10, 1987	Portland	United States	Cumberland County Civic Center
August 12, 1987	Wantagh	United States	Jones Beach Marine Theater
August 13, 1987	Wantagh	United States	Jones Beach Marine Theater
August 15, 1987	Lake Placid	United States	Olympic Center Ice Rink
August 17, 1987	Holmdel Township	United States	Garden State Arts Center
August 18, 1987	Holmdel Township	United States	Garden State Arts Center
August 19, 1987	Mansfield	United States	Great Woods Center for the Performing Arts
August 20, 1987	Mansfield	United States	Great Woods Center for the Performing Arts
August 22, 1987	Columbia	United States	Merriweather Post Pavilion
August 23, 1987	Columbia	United States	Merriweather Post Pavilion
August 24, 1987	New York City	United States	Madison Square Garden
August 25, 1987	Philadelphia	United States	The Spectrum
August 27, 1987	Montreal	Canada	Montreal Forum
August 29, 1987	Toronto	Canada	CNE Grandstand
August 30, 1987	Ottawa	Canada	Lansdowne Park
August 31, 1987	Saratoga Springs	United States	Saratoga Performing Arts Center
September 1, 1987	Geddes	United States	NYSF Grandstand
September 2, 1987	Rochester	United States	Rochester Community War Memorial
September 4, 1987	Clarkston	United States	Pine Knob Music Theatre
September 5, 1987	Clarkston	United States	Pine Knob Music Theatre
September 6, 1987	Charlevoix	United States	Castle Farms Music Theatre
September 9, 1987	Cuyahoga Falls	United States	Blossom Music Center
September 10, 1987	Dayton	United States	University of Dayton Arena
September 11, 1987	Hoffman Estates	United States	Poplar Creek Music Theater
September 12, 1987	Hoffman Estates	United States	Poplar Creek Music Theater
September 13, 1987	East Troy	United States	Alpine Valley Music Theatre
September 14, 1987	Milwaukee	United States	Marcus Amphitheater
September 16, 1987	St. Louis	United States	Kiel Auditorium
September 17, 1987	Johnson City	United States	ETSU Memorial Center
September 19, 1987	Augusta	United States	Augusta-Richmond County Civic Center
September 20, 1987	Albany	United States	Albany Civic Center
September 22, 1987	Montgomery	United States	Garrett Coliseum
September 23, 1987	Pensacola	United States	Pensacola Civic Center
September 26, 1987	Athens	United States	Convocation Center
September 30, 1987	Portland	United States	Memorial Coliseum
October 2, 1987	Costa Mesa	United States	Pacific Amphitheatre
October 4, 1987	Tacoma	United States	Tacoma Dome
October 5, 1987	Vancouver	Canada	Pacific Coliseum
October 7, 1987	Calgary	Canada	Olympic Saddledome
October 8, 1987	Edmonton	Canada	Northlands Coliseum
October 10, 1987	Winnipeg	Canada	Winnipeg Arena
October 13, 1987	Saint Paul	United States	St. Paul Civic Center
October 15, 1987	Cape Girardeau	United States	Show Me Center
October 16, 1987	Peoria	United States	Peoria Civic Center Arena
October 17, 1987	Kansas City	United States	Kemper Arena
October 18, 1987	Ames	United States	Hilton Coliseum
October 21, 1987	Rockford	United States	Rockford MetroCentre
October 22, 1987	Fort Wayne	United States	Allen County War Memorial Coliseum
October 23, 1987	West Lafayette	United States	Elliott Hall of Music
October 24, 1987	Louisville	United States	Freedom Hall
October 27, 1987	Charlotte	United States	Charlotte Coliseum
October 29, 1987	Mursfreesboro	United States	Murphy Center
October 30, 1987	Chattanooga	United States	UTC Arena
October 31, 1987	Knoxville	United States	Stokely Athletic Center
November 1, 1987	Charleston	United States	Charleston Civic Center
November 4, 1987	Pittsburgh	United States	Civic Arena
November 5, 1987	Richmond	United States	Richmond Coliseum
November 6, 1987	Chapel Hill	United States	Dean Smith Center
November 7, 1987	Hampton	United States	Hampton Coliseum
November 8, 1987	Columbia	United States	Carolina Coliseum
November 11, 1987	Atlanta	United States	Omni Coliseum
November 12, 1987	Daytona Beach	United States	Ocean Center Arena
November 13, 1987	Pembroke Pines	United States	Hollywood Sportatorium
November 14, 1987	Tampa	United States	USF Sun Dome
November 15, 1987	Tallahassee	United States	Tallahassee-Leon County Civic Center
November 18, 1987	Huntsville	United States	Von Braun Civic Center
November 19, 1987	Memphis	United States	Mid-South Coliseum
November 20, 1987	Birmingham	United States	BJCC Coliseum
November 21, 1987	Mobile	United States	Mobile Municipal Auditorium
November 25, 1987	Houston	United States	The Summit
November 27, 1987	San Antonio	United States	HemisFair Arena
November 28, 1987	Austin	United States	Frank Erwin Center
November 29, 1987	Dallas	United States	Reunion Arena
November 30, 1987	Odessa	United States	Ector County Coliseum
December 3, 1987	El Paso	United States	Don Haskins Center
December 4, 1987	Lubbock	United States	Lubbock Municipal Coliseum
December 5, 1987	Albuquerque	United States	Tingley Coliseum
December 6, 1987	Tempe	United States	ASU Activity Center
December 7, 1987	Tucson	United States	Tucson Community Center
December 9, 1987	San Diego	United States	San Diego Sports Arena
December 10, 1987	Inglewood	United States	The Forum
December 11, 1987	Inglewood	United States	The Forum
December 13, 1987	Oakland	United States	Oakland–Alameda County Coliseum Arena
December 14, 1987	Oakland	United States	Oakland–Alameda County Coliseum Arena
December 15, 1987	Sacramento	United States	ARCO Arena
December 16, 1987	Boise	United States	BSU Pavilion
December 17, 1987	Reno	United States	Lawlor Events Center
December 18, 1987	Salt Lake City	United States	Salt Palace
December 20, 1987	Denver	United States	McNichols Sports Arena
South America
January 3, 1988	Buenos Aires	Argentina	River Plate Stadium
January 9, 1988	São Paulo	Brazil	Estádio do Pacaembu
January 10, 1988	São Paulo	Brazil	Estádio do Pacaembu
January 16, 1988	Rio de Janeiro	Brazil	Estádio do Maracanã
North America
January 21, 1988	Honolulu	United States	Blaisdell Arena
Australia
January 26, 1988	Perth	Australia	Perth Entertainment Centre
January 27, 1988	Perth	Australia	Perth Entertainment Centre
January 30, 1988	Adelaide	Australia	Apollo Stadium
January 31, 1988	Adelaide	Australia	Apollo Stadium
February 1, 1988	Melbourne	Australia	Festival Hall
February 2, 1988	Melbourne	Australia	Festival Hall
February 4, 1988	Melbourne	Australia	Festival Hall
February 6, 1988	Sydney	Australia	Sydney Entertainment Centre
February 7, 1988	Sydney	Australia	Sydney Entertainment Centre
February 10, 1988	Brisbane	Australia	Brisbane Entertainment Centre
February 11, 1988	Brisbane	Australia	Brisbane Entertainment Centre
February 13, 1988	Darwin	Australia	Gardens Amphitheatre
February 15, 1988	Auckland	New Zealand	Mount Smart Stadium
Asia
February 16, 1988	Jakarta	Indonesia	Istora Senayan
February 17, 1988	Jakarta	Indonesia	Istora Senayan
February 18, 1988	Jakarta	Indonesia	Istora Senayan
February 20, 1988	Bukit Merah	Singapore	World Trade Centre
February 21, 1988	Bukit Merah	Singapore	World Trade Centre
February 22, 1988	Bukit Merah	Singapore	World Trade Centre
February 24, 1988	Kuala Lumpur	Malaysia	Stadium Negara
February 25, 1988	Kuala Lumpur	Malaysia	Stadium Negara
February 26, 1988	Bangkok	Thailand	Indoor Stadium Huamark
February 28, 1988	Bangkok	Thailand	Indoor Stadium Huamark
March 2, 1988	Manila	Philippines	Rizal Memorial Stadium
March 5, 1988	Taipei	Taiwan	Taipei Municipal Stadium
March 6, 1988	Taipei	Taiwan	Taipei Municipal Stadium
March 8, 1988	Taipei	Taiwan	Taipei Municipal Stadium
March 11, 1988	Yokohama	Japan	Kanagawa Kenmin Hall
March 14, 1988	Tokyo	Japan	Nippon Budokan
March 15, 1988	Tokyo	Japan	Nippon Budokan
March 16, 1988	Sendai	Japan	Sendai Gymnasium
March 18, 1988	Sapporo	Japan	Kosei Nenkin Kaikan
March 19, 1988	Sapporo	Japan	Kosei Nenkin Kaikan
March 21, 1988	Kanazawa	Japan	Kosei Nenkin Kaikan
March 22, 1988	Nagoya	Japan	Prefectural Gymnasium
March 24, 1988	Kyoto	Japan	Pulse Plaza
March 25, 1988	Matsuyama	Japan	Ehime Prefectural Cultural Hall
March 27, 1988	Osaka	Japan	Castle Hall
March 28, 1988	Osaka	Japan	Castle Hall
March 30, 1988	Osaka	Japan	Castle Hall

Cancellations and rescheduled shows

March 23-24, 1987	Oslo	Drammenhallen	Illness
March 26-27, 1987	Copenhagen, Denmark	Valbyhallen	Illness

=== Box office score data ===
Venue	City	Tickets Sold / Available	Gross Revenue
Cumberland County Civic Center	Portland	8,429 / 8,429 (100%)	$143,045
Jones Beach Marine Theater	Wantagh	20,000 / 20,000 (100%)	$400,000
Merriweather Post Pavilion	Columbia	13,859 / 26,344 (53%)	$219,141
Madison Square Garden	New York City	18,000 / 18,000 (100%)	$338,789
The Spectrum	Philadelphia	6,839 / 14,100 (49%)	$119,577
Montreal Forum	Montreal	10,061 / 15,000 (67%)	$180,815
CNE Grandstand	Toronto	18,023 / 22,000 (82%)	$301,804
Lansdowne Park	Ottawa	11,473 / 15,000 (76%)	$178,803
Saratoga Performing Arts Center	Saratoga Springs	6,892 / 25,103 (27%)	$112,088
NYSF Grandstand	Geddes	8,943 / 15,000 (60%)	$132,676
Rochester Community War Memorial	Rochester	4,369 / 9,200 (47%)	$76,328
Pine Knob Music Theatre	Clarkston	14,451 / 31,840 (45%)	$273,860
Castle Farms Music Theatre	Charlevoix	5,619 / 15,000 (37%)	$94,573
Blossom Music Center	Cuyahoga Falls	9,611 / 18,767 (51%)	$138,762
Poplar Creek Music Theater	Hoffman Estates	18,925 / 23,882 (79%)	$350,505
Alpine Valley Music Theatre	East Troy	5,563 / 10,946 (51%)	$128,947
Memorial Coliseum	Portland	6,107 / 9,040 (67%)	$106,705
Tacoma Dome	Tacoma	11,167 / 20,000 (56%)	$192,395
Olympic Saddledome	Calgary	14,706 / 14,706 (100%)	$220,271
Winnipeg Arena	Winnipeg	13,077 / 15,000 (87%)	$214,450
Show Me Center	Cape Girardeau	7,251 / 7,251 (100%)	$122,868
Murphy Center	Mursfreesboro	5,645 / 7,500 (75%)	$89,915
USF Sun Dome	Tampa	8,860 / 9,000 (98%)	$146,510
BJCC Coliseum	Birmingham	7,040 / 12,000 (59%)	$115,914
Civic Center	Pensacola	6,159 / 7,200 (85%)	$107,783
The Summit	Houston	7,762 / 9,452 (82%)	$119,980
Frank Erwin Center	Austin	5,876 / 6,731 (87%)	$93,575
Reunion Arena	Dallas	7,487 / 11,379 (66%)	$120,190
Tingley Coliseum	Albuquerque	6,001 / 10,656 (56%)	$113,753
Activity Center	Tempe	6,098 / 8,917 (68%)	$116,178
Tucson Community Center	Tucson	7,381 / 8,068 (91%)	$136,142
Oakland–Alameda County Coliseum Arena	Oakland	10,847 / 13,000 (83%)	$200,670
BSU Pavilion	Boise	10,571 / 10,571 (100%)	$163,663
Blaisdell Arena	Honolulu	8,026 / 8,026 (100%)	$148,481
TOTAL		330,888 / 476,878 (69%)	$5,785,107

== See also ==
- List of highest-attended concerts
- List of most-attended concert tours
- List of highest-grossing concert tours
- List of highest-grossing concert tours by women
