= Tina! =

Greatest hits album by Tina Turner
- Released: September 30, 2008
- Recorded: 1966–2008
- Genre: Soul; rock
- Length: 76:26
- Label: Capitol

Tina Turner chronology
All the Best (2004)	Tina! (2008)	Tina Live (2009)

Professional ratings
Review scores
Source	Rating
AllMusic	4/5 stars
PopMatters	5/10

Tina! is a greatest hits album by American singer Tina Turner, released in North America on September 30, 2008, by Capitol Records and in Germany on October 17, 2008 (the album was released as an "import" in other regions). The album was later expanded to a three-disc set titled The Platinum Collection, released in Europe on February 23, 2009, by Parlophone to coincide with the European leg of Turner's tour.

== Overview ==
Released in time for her 2008 world tour, the 18-track disc features Turner's biggest singles along with live recordings. It also includes two new songs, "I'm Ready" and "It Would Be a Crime". The digital release of the album features alternative versions of two songs. The original 1966 version of "River Deep – Mountain High" is replaced with the 1973 re-recording and the "Acid Queen" original soundtrack version with the album version.

The album was later expanded to a three-disc set titled The Platinum Collection, released in Europe on February 23, 2009, to coincide with the European leg of her tour. The album features nearly every single released by Turner as a solo artist, including duets, live versions and re-recordings, as well as selected songs from her days with her former husband, Ike Turner.

== Track listing ==
Tina! track listing
No.	Title	Writer(s)	Length
1.	"Steamy Windows"	White	4:05
2.	"River Deep – Mountain High" (Ike & Tina Turner)	Barry, Greenwich, Spector	3:40
3.	"Better Be Good to Me"	Chapman, Chinn, Knight	5:11
4.	"Acid Queen" (soundtrack version)	Townshend	3:50
5.	"What You Get Is What You See"	Britten, Lyle	4:26
6.	"What's Love Got to Do with It"	Britten, Lyle	3:48
7.	"Private Dancer" (single edit)	Knopfler	4:01
8.	"We Don't Need Another Hero (Thunderdome)" (single edit)	Britten, Lyle	4:16
9.	"I Don't Wanna Fight" (single edit)	Lulu, Lawrie, DuBerry	4:26
10.	"GoldenEye" (soundtrack version)	Bono, The Edge	4:43
11.	"Let's Stay Together" (live, Amsterdam 1996)	Green, Jackson, Mitchell	4:10
12.	"I Can't Stand the Rain" (live, Amsterdam 1996)	Bryant, Miller, Peebles	3:19
13.	"Addicted to Love" (live, London 1986)	Palmer	5:22
14.	"The Best"	Chapman, Knight	5:29
15.	"Proud Mary" (1993 version)	Fogerty	5:26
16.	"Nutbush City Limits" (Ike & Tina Turner)	Turner	3:02
17.	"It Would Be a Crime"	Chambers, Monahan	3:28
18.	"I'm Ready"	Chambers, Monahan	3:44

=== The Platinum Collection ===
Disc one
No.	Title	Writer(s)	Length
1.	"What's Love Got to Do with It"	Britten, Lyle	3:48
2.	"Nutbush City Limits" (Ike & Tina Turner)	Turner	2:56
3.	"Let's Stay Together"	Green, Jackson, Mitchell	5:16
4.	"Acid Queen" (soundtrack version)	Townshend	3:50
5.	"River Deep – Mountain High" (Ike & Tina Turner)	Barry, Greenwich, Spector	3:38
6.	"Private Dancer" (single edit)	Knopfler	4:03
7.	"Help!"	Lennon, McCartney	4:29
8.	"Tonight" (with David Bowie)	Bowie, Pop	3:42
9.	"Better Be Good to Me"	Chapman, Chinn, Knight	5:09
10.	"Show Some Respect"	Britten, Shifrin	3:17
11.	"I Can't Stand the Rain"	Bryant, Miller, Beeples	3:41
12.	"It's Only Love" (with Bryan Adams)	Adams, Vallance	3:14
13.	"I Want to Take You Higher" (Ike & Tina Turner)	Stone	2:51
14.	"Get Back" (Ike & Tina Turner)	Lennon, McCartney	3:03
15.	"Come Together" (Ike & Tina Turner)	Lennon, McCartney	3:38
16.	"Proud Mary" (Ike & Tina Turner)	Fogerty	4:56

Disc two
No.	Title	Writer(s)	Length
1.	"The Best"	Chapman, Knight	5:28
2.	"I Don't Wanna Lose You"	Hammond, Lyle	4:18
3.	"We Don't Need Another Hero (Thunderdome)" (single edit)	Britten, Lyle	4:15
4.	"One of the Living" (single edit)	Knight	4:11
5.	"Addicted to Love" (Live, London 1986)	Palmer	5:19
6.	"Typical Male"	Britten, Lyle	4:15
7.	"What You Get Is What You See"	Britten, Lyle	4:27
8.	"Tearing Us Apart" (with Eric Clapton)	Clapton, Phillinganes	4:16
9.	"Steamy Windows"	White	4:03
10.	"Two People"	Britten, Lyle	4:08
11.	"Break Every Rule"	Hine, Obstoj	4:00
12.	"Look Me in the Heart"	Steinberg, Kelly	3:42
13.	"Be Tender with Me Baby"	Hammond, Knight	4:15
14.	"Love Thing"	Hammond, Knight	4:26
15.	"Way of the World"	Hammond, Lyle	4:23
16.	"Nutbush City Limits" (The 90s Version)	Turner	3:42

Disc three
No.	Title	Writer(s)	Length
1.	"I Don't Wanna Fight" (single edit)	Lulu, Lawrie, DuBerry	4:24
2.	"It Takes Two" (with Rod Stewart)	Stevenson, Moy	4:11
3.	"GoldenEye" (soundtrack version)	Bono, The Edge	4:42
4.	"I Want You Near Me"	Britten, Lyle	3:51
5.	"Why Must We Wait Until Tonight" (single edit)	Adams, Robert John "Mutt" Lange	4:27
6.	"Whatever You Want" (single edit)	Baker, Zarr, Dayne	4:38
7.	"On Silent Wings" (featuring Sting) (single edit)	White, Ralston	4:18
8.	"Missing You"	Waite, Leonard, Sandford	4:37
9.	"Something Beautiful Remains"	Britten, Lyle	4:20
10.	"In Your Wildest Dreams" (featuring Antonio Banderas)	Chapman, Knight	5:28
11.	"When the Heartache Is Over"	Stack, Reid	3:42
12.	"Whatever You Need"	Roberts, Courtenay	4:46
13.	"Open Arms"	Brammer, Van Sertima, Barson	4:00
14.	"It Would Be a Crime"	Chambers, Monahan	3:26
15.	"I'm Ready"	Chambers, Monahan	3:42
16.	"Cose della vita" (with Eros Ramazzotti)	Ramazzotti, Turner	4:48

== Charts ==
=== Weekly charts ===
Weekly chart performance for Tina!
Chart (2008–2009)	Peak position
Austrian Albums (Ö3 Austria)	13
Belgian Albums (Ultratop Flanders)	13
Belgian Albums (Ultratop Wallonia)	74
Canadian Albums (Nielsen SoundScan)	49
Croatian International Albums (HDU)	11
Czech Albums (ČNS IFPI)	42
Finnish Albums (Suomen virallinen lista)	14
French Compilation Albums (SNEP)	17
German Albums (Offizielle Top 100)	22
Italian Albums (FIMI)	68
Polish Albums (ZPAV)	15
Portuguese Albums (AFP)	18
Spanish Albums (Promusicae)	37
Swiss Albums (Schweizer Hitparade)	16
US Billboard 200	61
US Top R&B/Hip-Hop Albums (Billboard)	28

Weekly chart performance for The Platinum Collection
Chart (2009)	Peak position
Belgian Albums (Ultratop Flanders)	36
Dutch Albums (Album Top 100)	9
Irish Albums (IRMA)	16
Scottish Albums (OCC)	25
UK Albums (OCC)	14

Weekly chart performance for Tina!/The Platinum Collection
Chart (2023)	Peak position
Australian Albums (ARIA)	58
UK Albums (OCC)	32
UK Albums Sales (OCC)	22

=== Year-end charts ===
Year-end chart performance for The Platinum Collection
Chart (2009)	Position
Dutch Albums (Album Top 100)	97

== Certifications ==
Certifications for Tina!
Region	Certification	Certified units/sales
Belgium (BRMA)	Gold	15,000^{*}
^{*} Sales figures based on certification alone.

Certifications for The Platinum Collection
Region	Certification	Certified units/sales
United Kingdom (BPI)	Gold	100,000^{‡}
^{‡} Sales+streaming figures based on certification alone.
