= Tina Live in Europe =

Live album by Tina Turner
- Released: March 21, 1988
- Recorded: 1985–1987
- Venues: NEC, Birmingham; Wembley Arena, London; Camden Palace, London; Westfallenhalle, Dortmund, West Germany; Isstadion, Stockholm, Sweden
- Genres: Soul; rock; pop
- Length: 127:22
- Label: Capitol
- Producers: John Hudson, Terry Britten

Tina Turner chronology
Break Every Rule (1986)	Tina Live in Europe (1988)	Foreign Affair (1989)

Singles from Tina Live in Europe
- 1. "Addicted to Love" Released: March 1988; 2. "Nutbush City Limits" Released: March 1988 (EU); 3. "A Change Is Gonna Come" Released: June 1988 (UK); 4. "Tonight" Released: November 1988 (EU); 5. "634–5789" Released: 1989 (EU)

Professional ratings
Review scores
Source	Rating
AllMusic	2/5 stars

Tina Live in Europe is the first live album by Tina Turner, released on Capitol Records on March 21, 1988.

== Composition ==
The album is compiled of live performances made between 1985 and 1987, the majority of which are from Turner's Break Every Rule World Tour but also from the 1985 Private Dancer Tour, as well as the 1986 Tina Turner: Break Every Rule HBO special recorded in London at the Camden Palace (now Koko), masquerading as Le Club Zero in Paris, also released on video.

The double CD version of Tina Live in Europe includes four bonus songs not featured on the original double vinyl album. Certain limited editions of the double LP included a bonus one-sided 7" single or CD single featuring an exclusive "Tender Remix" of "Two People", mixed by Ben Liebrand.

== Critical reception ==
In 1989 the album won a Grammy Award for Best Female Rock Vocal Performance.

== Single releases ==
Five singles were released from Tina Live In Europe; "Nutbush City Limits", a cover of Robert Palmer's "Addicted to Love, "Tonight" with David Bowie, "A Change Is Gonna Come" and "634–5789" with Robert Cray, the most successful being "Addicted to Love" which became a mainstay in Turner's live repertoire and was later included on the European editions of her 1991 hits compilation Simply the Best.

== Track listing ==
Disc 1

No.	Title	Writer(s)	Length
1.	"What You Get Is What You See"	Terry Britten, Graham Lyle	5:34
2.	"Break Every Rule"	Rupert Hine, Jeannette Obstoj	4:28
3.	"I Can't Stand the Rain"	Ann Peebles, Don Bryant, Bernard Miller	3:25
4.	"Two People"	Britten, Lyle	4:26
5.	"Girls" (CD bonus)	David Bowie, Erdal Kızılçay	4:54
6.	"Typical Male"	Britten, Lyle	3:59
7.	"Back Where You Started" (CD bonus)	Bryan Adams, Jim Vallance	4:21
8.	"Better Be Good to Me"	Holly Knight, Nicky Chinn, Mike Chapman	6:29
9.	"Addicted to Love"	Robert Palmer	5:22
10.	"Private Dancer"	Mark Knopfler	5:37
11.	"We Don't Need Another Hero (Thunderdome)"	Britten, Lyle	4:56
12.	"What's Love Got to Do with It"	Britten, Lyle	5:28
13.	"Let's Stay Together"	Willie Mitchell, Al Green, Al Jackson Jr.	4:40
14.	"Show Some Respect"	Britten, Sue Shifrin	3:05

Disc 2

No.	Title	Writer(s)	Length
1.	"Land of a Thousand Dances"	Chris Kenner	3:06
2.	"In the Midnight Hour"	Wilson Pickett, Steve Cropper	3:32
3.	"634–5789" (with Robert Cray)	Eddie Floyd, Cropper	3:05
4.	"A Change Is Gonna Come" (featuring guitar solo by Robert Cray)	Sam Cooke	6:44
5.	"River Deep – Mountain High" (CD bonus)	Phil Spector, Jeff Barry, Ellie Greenwich	4:11
6.	"Tearing Us Apart" (with Eric Clapton)	Eric Clapton, Greg Phillinganes	4:41
7.	"Proud Mary"	John Fogerty	4:47
8.	"Help!"	John Lennon, Paul McCartney	5:03
9.	"Tonight" (with David Bowie)	Bowie, Iggy Pop	4:15
10.	"Let's Dance" (with David Bowie)	Bowie	3:27
11.	"Overnight Sensation" (CD bonus)	Knopfler	3:54
12.	"It's Only Love" (with Bryan Adams)	Adams, Vallance	4:15
13.	"Nutbush City Limits"	Tina Turner	3:43
14.	"Paradise Is Here"	Paul Brady	5:41

== B-sides ==
Title	Single(s)
"Legs"	"Nutbush City Limits" and "Addicted to Love"

== Personnel ==
- Tina Turner – vocals

The Tina Turner Band

- Jamie Ralston – guitar, vocals
- Laurie Wisefield – guitar
- Bob Feit – bass guitar, vocals
- Jack Bruno – drums
- Stevie Scales – percussion
- John Miles – guitar, vocals
- Ollie Marland – keyboards, vocals
- Deric Dyer – saxophone, keyboards

Other musicians

- Jamie West-Oram – guitar, backing vocals
- Don Snow – keyboards, vocals
- Tim Cappello – keyboards, saxophone
- Alan Clark – keyboards
- Kenny Moore – keyboards
- Gary Barnacle – saxophone

Production

- John Hudson – producer, mixing (tracks 1.01, 1.02, 1.04–1.07, 1.09, 1.11, 1.12, 2.01–2.04, 2.06, 2.07, 2.11, 2.13, 2.14)
- Mike Ging – assistant
- Terry Britten – producer (tracks 1.03, 1.08, 1.10, 1.13, 1.14, 2.05, 2.08–2.10, 2.12)
- Roger Davies – executive producer

== Charts ==
=== Weekly charts ===
Chart (1988)	Peak position
Australian Albums (Kent Music Report)	37
Austrian Albums (Ö3 Austria)	4
Canadian Albums (RPM)	34
Dutch Albums (Stichting Nederlandse)	2
European Albums (Top 100)	4
Finnish Albums (Suomen virallinen lista)	15
French Albums (SNEP)	21
German Albums (Offizielle Top 100)	4
Japanese Albums (Oricon)	87
New Zealand Albums (RMNZ)	27
Norwegian Albums (VG-lista)	16
Swedish Albums (Sverigetopplistan)	8
Swiss Albums (Schweizer Hitparade)	3
UK Albums (Official Charts)	8
US Billboard 200	86
US Cash Box Top Pop Albums	70

=== Year-end charts ===
Chart (1988)	Peak position
Austrian Albums (Ö3 Austria)	15
Dutch Albums (MegaCharts)	67
French Albums (SNEP)	69
German Albums (Offizielle Top 100)	34
Chart (1989)	Peak position
Dutch Albums (MegaCharts)	33

== Certifications and sales ==
Region	Certification	Certified units/sales
Austria (IFPI Austria)	Platinum	50,000^{*}
Brazil (Pro-Música Brasil)	Gold	100,000^{*}
Germany (BVMI)	Gold	250,000^{^}
Netherlands (NVPI)	2× Platinum	200,000^{^}
Portugal (AFP)	Gold	20,000^{^}
Spain (Promusicae)	Gold	50,000^{^}
United Kingdom (BPI)	Gold	100,000^{^}
United States	—	200,000
^{*} Sales figures based on certification alone.^{^} Shipments figures based on certification alone.
