= Norman Seeff =

South African photographer and filmmaker

- Born: 5 March 1939 (age 87); Johannesburg, South Africa
- Occupations: Photographer; filmmaker

Norman Seeff (born 5 March 1939) is a South African photographer and filmmaker. Since moving to the United States in 1969, his work has been focused on the exploration of human creativity and the inner dynamics of the creative process.

== Early life ==
Seeff graduated with honors in science and art at King Edward VII School in Johannesburg. At the age of 17, he was drafted as the youngest player in the South African national soccer league.

Seeff qualified as a medical doctor in 1965. For three years he worked in emergency medicine at the Chris Hani Baragwanath Hospital in Soweto, focusing on the management of traumatic shock. In 1968, he immigrated to the United States to pursue his creative passions and artistic abilities.

== Career ==
=== New York ===
Soon after Seeff arrived in New York City, his photographs of the people he encountered on the streets of Manhattan were discovered by the famed graphic designer Bob Cato. As the former Vice President of Creative Services at Columbia Records, Cato was renowned for his album cover design which had won two Grammy Awards. Cato became an important mentor to Seeff and gave him his first major photographic assignment producing images for the Band's Stage Fright album. Seeff's iconic image of the group was re-produced as a poster inserted under the album's shrink wrap, which when unfolded, became a hugely popular collector's item. This brought him immediate recognition and launched his career as a "rock" photographer. His early work also includes images of Debbie Harry, Patti Smith, Robert Mapplethorpe, Andy Warhol as well as other New York City personalities.

In 1971, Seeff spent a year as Professor of Photography at Bennington College in Vermont.

=== Los Angeles ===
At the end of 1971 and on the recommendation of Cato, Seeff relocated to Los Angeles to become creative director of United Artists Records. His innovative approach to collaborative art-direction resulted in multiple Grammy Award nominations for graphic design.

Two years later, he opened an independent studio on the 'strip' on Sunset Boulevard. His photographic sessions soon became legendary and attracted audiences of 30–40 at each session, swelling to over 200 on some occasions.

In his evolution as a photographer of public personalities, Seeff realized that to accomplish the vitality and authenticity he was looking for in his images required a paradigm shift in his interaction with artists and innovators.

Creating the session as both a nurturing and challenging environment for a co-creative relationship with artists, it evolved as a laboratory for the exploration of the fundamental dynamics of creativity from the "inside" out. Responding to the emotional authenticity and depth of the creative communication between himself and artists, Seeff brought a film crew into a session for the first time in 1975, beginning with Ike and Tina Turner.

For Seeff, the session became the art-form itself, transforming into a multi-disciplinary process of photography, filmmaking and creative communication. Shifting his focus from ends to means and creating an authentic experience in the moment revealed that optimal experience flowed elegantly into optimal performance. For Seeff it was a personal paradigm shift in his understanding of the creative process.

Seeff has documented over 500 sessions with artists of many disciplines including musicians, actors, writers, directors, actors, scientists, entrepreneurs, and politicians. He has interacted with creators and innovators including Ray Charles, the Carpenters, Joni Mitchell, Guthrie Thomas, Kiss, Steve Jobs, Steve Martin, John Huston, Martin Scorsese, Billy Wilder, Bob Fosse, will.i.am, Tina Turner, Alicia Keys and Francis Crick.

=== Television commercials ===
In 1990, Seeff applied the spontaneous and co-creative approach he had developed during his photo sessions to working with actors in television commercials. During the 1990s, he became an acclaimed, award-winning director of hundreds of national commercials for major brands including Apple, Levi's, Glaxo, Nissan, Toyota, General Motors and Motorola.

=== Recent work ===
Seeff returned to photography and the documentation of his sessions in 1999 in order to produce a documentary exploration of the artist's journey for the opening of Paul Allen's Experience Music Project and sessions with the stars of Paramount Television and Caltech's many Nobel Science Laureates.

It was the latter assignment that led to Seeff being invited to work with the NASA space explorers at the Jet Propulsion Laboratory (JPL) and to the production of his documentary film Triumph of the Dream. The documentary reveals the human face of the Mars Exploration mission that landed two rovers on Mars in 2004. In the film, Seeff uses the [[:|Seven Stage Dynamic of the Creative Process]] he developed in his photo sessions as the underlying narrative structure.

Seeff's recent sessions have included an exploration of the world of electronic music with participants of the 2013 Red Bull Music Academy and the production of a web series for Red Bull Media House.

== Exploration of creativity ==
As a consequence of 35 years of research and development of creativity in action, Seeff has developed a body of content exploring the roots of creativity, innovation and optimal performance, and has identified schematics describing the archetypes of the creative process that function across all creative disciplines. The fundamental tenet of his work is that all creation is sourced in the inner resources of consciousness and that everyone has access to the same innate resources.

Seeff views himself as a conduit for the voices of the hundreds of creative and innovative individuals working at the higher reaches of human potential he has interacted with over many decades. He is now preparing this multi-media and multi-disciplinary content for global release via multiple interactive digital platforms.

== Personal life ==
Seeff lives in Los Angeles with his wife Sue Kiel and works out of his studio in Burbank. He has two children. His daughter, Tai Power Seeff, whom he shared with actress Taryn Power, is a photographer.

== Famous photo sessions ==
- Patti Smith & Robert Mapplethorpe 1969: Seeff and Mapplethorpe met soon after arriving in New York, and Mapplethorpe asked him if he could airbrush some of his prints. Seeff loved what Mapplethorpe had done and offered to photograph Mapplethorpe and Smith. These shots have been featured widely since the release of Smith's book "Just Kids".
- The Band 1969: Seeff was commissioned by the late Bob Cato to take the liner images for the Band's 1970 release Stage Fright. However, Cato loved Seeff's image so much it became the major design feature of the album as a poster insert. The poster rapidly became a collector's item and helped launch Seeff's career as one of rock n roll's leading photographers and album cover designers.
- James Taylor 1970: Seeff photographed Taylor who was building a home on Martha's Vineyard. Taylor and singer-songwriter Carly Simon were later to live in the house.
- Andy Warhol 1970: Seeff photographed Warhol and members of the Factory at Warhol's studio in New York.
- Mick Jagger 1971: Seeff photographed Jagger and the Rolling Stones for the Exile on Main Street album, in which Seeff was the art director.
- Keith Richards 1971: Seeff also took a number of individual shots of Richards during the Exile on Main Street shoot.
- Rolling Stones 1971: The Stones commissioned Seeff to shoot an iconic series of 12 images that were featured as an insert of 12 postcards. The postcards are to be re-released in 2010.
- Bobby Womack 1972: Seeff worked with Womack numerous times, but perhaps the best-known photograph by Seeff of Womack is featured on the cover of his 1972 album Understanding.
- Miles Davis 1974: Seeff shot his iconic image of Davis who at the time was recovering from a throat condition and had just come off stage.
- Sly Stone 1974: Seeff's shot of Sly Stone kissing his then wife Kathy Silva was included in the Brooklyn Museum 2009 exhibition Who Shot Rock & Roll: A Photographic History, 1955 to the Present.
- Carly Simon 1974: Seeff's cover shot of Carly Simon dressed in a teddy for her Playing Possum album was thought to be 'racy' and was featured in Sheila Weeler's book Girls Like Us. In fact, it came from a series of shots of Simon doing yoga poses.
- Kiss 1974: Much has been written about Seeff's shoot with Kiss for their 1974 album Hotter Than Hell although by all reports, it is more fiction than fact.
- Ike and Tina Turner 1975: Seeff was a great admirer of the artistry of both Ike and Tina and many of his shots from this session illustrate the edge in their relationship. This session was the first that Seeff documented on 16mm film.
- Joni Mitchell 1975 & 1976: Seeff had a long working relationship with Mitchell with whom he did 7 sessions.
- The Jacksons 1976: This series of shots features Michael Jackson in his late teens.
- Frank Zappa 1976: Seeff photographed Zappa multiple times. The images were used for album cover art (see cover of Strictly Commercial) and were featured extensively in the February 1994 issue of Musician magazine in observation of Zappa's recent passing in late 1993. Prior to his death, Seeff's photos of Zappa and his daughter Moon were also featured in a 1989 LIFE magazine article.
- Johnny Mathis 1976: This session was also filmed on 16mm film.
- Cher 1976: Seeff shot Cher for her album I'd Rather Believe in You. The shots captured Cher's iconic '70s look.
- Eagles 1976: Seeff shot the Eagles for their album One of These Nights.
- John Travolta 1976: Seeff photographed and filmed Travolta who was preparing for his starring role in the 1977 film Saturday Night Fever.
- Cher & Gregg Allman 1977: Seeff shot a series of images of Cher and Gregg Allman while they were married.
- Steve Martin 1977: This series of images demonstrate the amazing physical comedic talent of Martin early in his career. The images were used as album cover art for his 1977 album Let's Get Small.
- Zubin Mehta 1977: During the shoot, Mehta asked Seeff to play classical music at full volume to illustrate that it could outperform rock 'n' roll.
- Van Morrison 1977: This shoot of Morrison performing in a private concert was also filmed on 16mm film. Morrison considers it one of his best examples of performance footage.
- Santana 1978: Seeff's shots of Santana were taken for the Inner Secrets album.
- Johnny Cash 1978: Seeff shot Cash on several occasions, including the cover for Cash's 1984 album Biggest Hits.
- Fleetwood Mac 1978: Taken for the Tusk album, Seeff's images of Fleetwood Mac illustrate the charisma and intensity of relationships between the members of the band.
- Rickie Lee Jones 1978: Taken for Jones' first album release that broke her into the music business.
- Jean Terrell 1978: Former lead singer of the Supremes; taken for her debut solo album.
- Chicago 1978: Taken for the Hot Streets album, this was the first and only time Chicago had a photo of the band on the cover.
- Van Halen 1979: Taken for the Women and Children First album.
- Boomtown Rats 1979: Featuring Bob Geldof was shot for a LIFE magazine article on new music.
- Blondie 1979: Seeff photographed the band for their album Eat to the Beat.
- Curtis Mayfield 1979: Mayfield wrote an original song during the filmed photo session.
- John Belushi 1981: Seeff photographed Belushi both alone and as part of the Blues Brothers.
- Sir Francis Crick 1982: Seeff photographed the Nobel Prize winner, the discover of the double helix, both at the Salk Institute for Biological Studies and at his home.
- Tina Turner 1983: Seeff was asked to take a series of images of Turner as she rebuilt her career, launching a string of hits beginning with her 1983 single "Let's Stay Together", which featured Seeff's image on the cover. The photo session with Tina was filmed and featured spontaneous live performances.
- Quincy Jones 1984: Seeff's shot Quincy Jones with his daughter at his home and was featured in the 2009 book The Art & Soul of Quincy Jones.
- Steve Jobs 1984: Seeff shot Jobs at the Apple HQ in Cupertino, California, and also at Jobs' home in Woodside. These are iconic images of the young Steve Jobs in the early days of Apple's success and one was chosen by Walter Isaacson for the cover of his biography that was released in October 2011. Soon after Jobs' death, Seeff's shots also ran on the covers of Rolling Stone as well as TIME magazine(different photos).
- Ray Charles 1985: The classic image was used by Concord Records on the album Genius Loves Company.
- John Huston 1985: Seeff interviewed and photographed Huston for a series on American film directors. One of the photographs from this session was used by Apple for their "Think Different" campaign and appeared on giant billboards across America.
- Martin Scorsese 1986: Seeff photographed and filmed their conversation on the creative process for a series on American film directors.
- Billy Wilder 1986: Seeff's photograph of Wilder greets patrons to the Billy Wilder Theater at the Hammer Museum in Los Angeles.
- Jim Henson 1986: Shot for a series on American film directors including an image which became a US Postal Service stamp.
- Bob Fosse 1986: Seeff photographed and filmed Fosse for a series on American film directors.
- David Crosby 1986: From a shoot with Stephen Stills and Graham Nash.
- Norman Mailer 1988: Seeff photographed an entire issue of Esquire magazine on authors, which included Mailer.
- Aerosmith 1989: Seeff shot the photographic session for their album Pump. The session was also documented.
- Steven Tyler 1989: Photographed during the session for Aerosmith's album Pump.

== Record cover design and photography ==
- From 1969 onward Seeff contributed photography and art directed and designed hundreds of record covers
- Tammy Wynette, Womanhood (album) (1978, Photography;) Only Lonely Sometimes (1980, Photography.)
- The Band, Stage Fright: Photography 1969
- Ike & Tina, What You Hear is What You Get – Live at Carnegie Hall: Art Direction & Photography 1971
- The Rolling Stones, Exile on Main Street: Art Direction & Photography 1971
- Bobby Womack, : Art Direction & Photography 1972
- Joni Mitchell, Court and Spark: Photography 1972
- Ike & Tina, Let Me Touch Your Mind: Art Director, Design & Videographs 1973
- Leo Kottke, My Feet are Smiling: Photography 1973
- Steve Miller Band, The Joker: Photography Aug 1973
- Kiss, Hotter Than Hell: Art Direction & Photography 1974
- John Klemmer, Touch: Design & Photography 1974
- Rufus, Rufusized: Photography 1974
- Joni Mitchell, Hissing of Summer Lawns: Photography 1975
- Art Garfunkel, Breakaway: Photography 1975
- Carly Simon, Playing Possum: Photography and Design 1975
- Earth, Wind & Fire, That's the Way of the World: Photography 1975
- Eagles, One of These Nights: Photography 1975
- Carmen McRae, I am Music: Photography 1975
- Gloria Gaynor, Experience Gloria Gaynor: Photography 1975
- Joni Mitchell, Hejira: Photography 1976
- James Taylor, In the Pocket: Photography 1976
- The Jacksons, The Jacksons: Photography 1976
- Andy Gibb, Flowing Rivers: Photography 1977
- Godiego, Dead End: photography 1977
- George Duke, Reach for It: Photography 1977
- Joni Mitchell, Don Juan's Reckless Daughter: Photography 1977
- Santana, Inner Secrets: Design, Art Director & Photography 1978
- Earl Klugh, Magic in Your Eyes: Photography 1978
- Glen Campbell, Basic: Photography 1978
- George Duke, "Don't Let Go": Photography 1978
- Chicago, "Hot Streets": Design & Photography 1978
- Captain & Tennille, Dream: Photography 1978
- Dan Fogelberg & Tim Weisberg, Twin Sons of Different Mothers: Photography 1978
- Foreigner, Double Vision: Design & Photography 1978
- Rufus & Chaka Khan, Street Player: Photography 1978
- Gilberto Gil, Nightingale: Photography 1979
- Fleetwood Mac, Tusk: Photography 1979
- Captain & Tennille, Make Your Move: Photography 1979
- Tanya Tucker, Tear Me Apart: Design & Photography 1979
- Blondie, Eat to the Beat: Design & Photography 1979
- England Dan & John Ford Coley, Dr. Heckyll and Mr. Jive: Design & Photography 1979
- Curtis Mayfield, Heartbeat: Photography 1979
- Van Morrison, Into the Music: Photography & Design 1979
- Van Halen, Women and Children First: Photography 1980
- George Benson, Give Me the Night: Photography 1980
- Carpenters, Lovelines: Photography 1981, album release 1989
- Andy Gibb, Greatest Hits": Photography 1980
- Al Jarreau, Jarreau (album): Photography 1983
- Tina Turner, "Let's Stay Together": Photography 1983
- Johnny Cash, Biggest Hits: Photography 1984
- Joni Mitchell, Dog Eat Dog: Photography 1985
- Ramsey Lewis & Nancy Wilson, The Two of Us: Photography 1984
- Aerosmith, Pump: Photography 1989
- Frank Zappa, Strictly Commercial: Photography 1995
- Raphael Saadiq, The Way I See It: Photography 2008

== Books ==
Seeff's first book, Hot Shots, published in 1974, was awarded the New York Art Directors Club Gold Medal for photography. His second book, Sessions, was published in 1988. In December 2018, he released JONI: THE JONI MITCHELL SESSIONS featuring images and insights from 12 sessions with the legendary artist from 1972 to 1985.
