= Tina!: 50th Anniversary Tour =

2008–09 concert tour by Tina Turner

- Tour by Tina Turner
- Promotional poster for the tour
- Location: Europe; North America
- Associated album: Tina!
- Start date: October 1, 2008
- End date: May 5, 2009
- Legs: 2
- No. of shows: 90
- Attendance: 1.2 million
- Box office: $132.5 million ($198.84 million in 2025 dollars)
- Website: Tour website (defunct)

Tina Turner concert chronology
- Twenty Four Seven Tour (2000); Tina!: 50th Anniversary Tour (2008–2009); N/A

Tina!: 50th Anniversary Tour was the eleventh and final concert tour by singer Tina Turner. It was the first tour by Turner in eight years, following her record-breaking "Twenty Four Seven Tour". The trek marked the singer's 50th year in music—since joining Ike Turner and the Kings of Rhythm in St. Louis, Missouri. In conjunction with the tour, Turner released the compilation album, Tina!. Beginning October 1, 2008, and concluded on May 5, 2009.

With the tour, Turner continued her success in concert sales. The North American leg of the tour played 37 sold-out performances, earning over $47.7 million—becoming one of the biggest tours in the territory for 2008. The success continued for the European leg. Turner played 47 sold-out performances, earning over $84.8 million—becoming the 9th highest earning tour in 2009. The tour was seen by over one million spectators and grossed over $130 million. The concerts received additional accolades, receiving an "Excellence Award" from Live Design Magazine.

== Background ==
A brand new stage show that will feature hit after hit spanning Turner's entire career, with a spectacular production including the singer's top-notch band, innovative choreography, hi-tech lighting and much more. (...) The set, the production, the songs, and Turner's unique stage presence will delight her legions of fans who have followed the legendary diva's extraordinary creative journey, while seducing new admirers and proving that her vocal majesty still continues its reign to this day.

In 2008, Turner made her first appearance on U.S. television for the 50th Grammy Awards since her 2005 album promotional tour. On the show, she performed a medley of "What's Love Got to Do with It" and "Better Be Good to Me" as well as "Proud Mary" with Beyoncé. In the same night, she received an award for her contribution to River: The Joni Letters. Several months later, the singer appeared on The Oprah Winfrey Show with Cher concerning their performance history. This is where Turner announced she was embarking on a world tour. She stated it was the best time for her to go on tour as her peers were performing well on the touring circuit. She continued to say she wanted to do it before it was too late. In sequential, Turner says actress and friend Sophia Loren suggested the singer reconsider retirement because her fans wanted to see her again. Turner was also encouraged to return to the stage following the overwhelming response from her Grammy performance. She further remarks:

"I was at the Armani show in Milan just chatting with Sophia Loren. I told her I was taking a break. She said for how long … I said oh, seven years. She said, 'Break over. People want to see you. Get back to work'. […] After [performing at] the Grammys when I got home to Zürich, people would come up to me in the restaurant, in the ladies room, on the street … everywhere. I started getting lots of little slips of paper and napkins with notes from fans. Some of them were so touching about my life, or a song and how it helped them. Each time I kept the note ... and suddenly there was a pile. I called my manager and said, 'It's time!'"

Originally known as "Tina!: Live in Concert", Turner decided to have the tour commemorate her fiftieth year performing on stage. Turner first performed at Club Imperial with Ike Turner and the Kings of Rhythm in 1958 (at the time, Turner was known as "Little Ann"). The tour was sponsored by Amway Global and received early praise from the media and fans. Tour dates were announced in May 2008. While promoting the tour on The Early Show, Turner stated she was ready to return to perform in America and perform in familiar cities. She followed with saying she wanted the tour to start in Missouri since that is where her music career began. Rehearsals for the tour began in late September 2008 at Sprint Center in Kansas City. Production rehearsals began in July 2008 in Hershey, Pennsylvania. The singer gave Access Hollywood an exclusive backstage glimpse at rehearsals and a photoshoot for the tour and upcoming album, Tina!: Her Greatest Hits. The success of the tour was immediate as many shows sold out within minutes. Turner announced additional dates in the United States and release dates for Europe. The tour was a triumph for Turner and continued her success as one of the biggest concert draws in history. The show was recorded for a live album and DVD release entitled, Tina Live.

== Stage ==
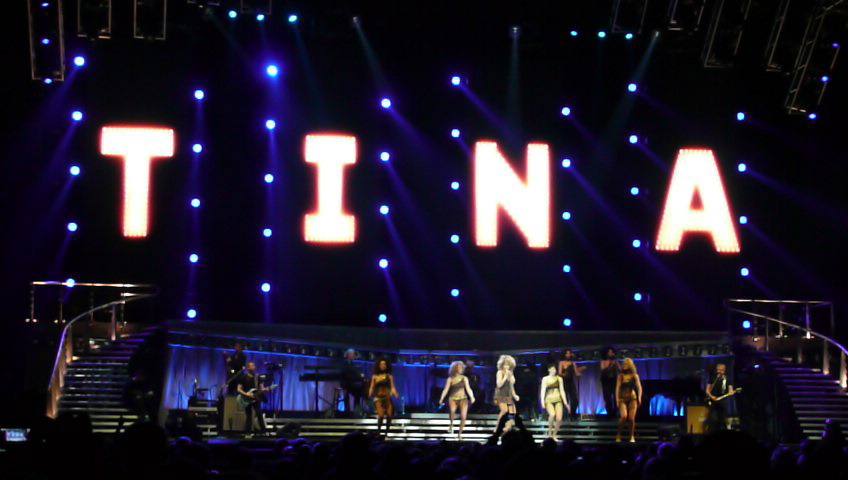
Tina Turner on the stage

The stage for the tour was designed by Mark Fisher, who has designed Turner's stages since 1983. The stage itself is a mixture of elements from the singer's previous stages including "The Staircase", "The Claw" and "The Iris". Fisher formed a creative team with Turner's manager Roger Davies, Baz Halpin and Toni Basil to not only design the stage but also the show. The team wanted to feature elements reminiscent of Turner's previous stage productions. The stage measurements were 52.5' deep by 70' wide and weighed 75 tons. The lower tier featured an airlift while the upper tier contained a scissorlift. Due to budget constraints, the staircase was replaced with a small platform that lowered Turner onto the stages. On the upper tier of the stage featured two LED screens that opened resembling the effect used on the Twenty Four Seven Tour. A new stage prop known as "The Cage" was used for the performance of "We Don't Need Another Hero (Thunderdome)".

== Concert synopsis ==
The show began with an updated version of The Beatles' "Get Back". As the song ends, the curtain rises, revealing Turner on a platform 30' above the stage. The platform lowers as the opening bars for "Steamy Windows" begin to play. The singer quickly transitions into "Typical Male" before she greets the audience, telling them, "I want you to have a good time". This leads into "River Deep – Mountain High" followed by "What You Get Is What You See", where Turner addresses male members of the audience. Turner goes into 'Better Be Good to Me" ending with a sing along with the audience. The song concludes with a dance break featuring "The Ninjas". The performance shows the two dancers fighting with a security guard as the show flows into "Won't Get Fooled Again". Turner returns onstage to perform "Acid Queen". She follows with the performance of her biggest hit "What's Love Got to Do with It?". As the song ends, Turner seeks a call and response from the audience, asking them to say "What's love got to do with it?". "Private Dancer" comes next leading into another dance interlude by The Ninjas. After a costume change, Turner returns onstage to perform "We Don't Need Another Hero (Thunderdome)" as Aunty Entity. The show then proceeds to a 30-minute intermission and returns with a video montage set to "I Don't Wanna Fight".

Turner reappears to perform "Help", "Let's Stay Together", "Undercover Agent for the Blues" and "I Can't Stand the Rain" in an acoustic setting. She returns to her rock prowess with a medley of The Rolling Stones' "Jumping Jack Flash" and "It's Only Rock 'n Roll (But I Like It)". The singer departs the stage once again and her background dancers (known as "Flowers") perform a tango-influenced routine to "007 Theme". The video screens open to reveal "The Iris" and Turner begins to perform "GoldenEye". The singer then goes to the lower tier of the stage to perform "Addicted to Love" and "The Best". Taking a moment to introduce the band, Turner closes the show with her rendition of "Proud Mary". For the encore, Turner returns to perform "Nutbush City Limits" on "The Claw". The cherry picker takes Turner around the audience as she asks them to sing "Nutbush". As Turner ends the night, she performs "Be Tender with Me Baby".

== Critical response ==
Turner received high praise from both critics and spectators before the tour commenced. For the inaugural concert, Flannery Cashill (The Pitch) wrote that the show was nothing short of "amazing". He elaborates, "After several teasing nice-and-easy near starts, the arena burst into 'Proud Mary' and Turner and her dancers delivered all of the moves – the paddle-wheel arms, the steps, the dips, the various swim strokes, the thrusts of the glorious mane, all of it atop those stilettos." At the concert for the Staples Center, David Wild (Rolling Stone) described the show as "slick and soulful." He continued, "[...] last night was proof positive that the former Anna Mae Bullock still deserves our R-E-S-P-E-C-T. By the [end of the night] the Queen had already touched her royal subjects the old fashioned way – nice and rough."

J. Freedom du Lac (The Washington Post) called the singer "a force to be reckoned with" following her performance at the Verizon Center. He continues, "Turner put on a swaggering, high-voltage rock spectacle in which she easily dispatched any concerns that she's become some sort of museum piece -- even if she was presented on a pedestal: The concert opened with the world's sexiest sexagenarian standing on a platform, some 20 feet above her band." For her concert at the famous Madison Square Garden, Ben Ratliff (The New York Times) called the show "nice and rough". He states, "On solid ground in high heels, she was a ferocious, shaky blur. If Motown choreography intimates the smooth stroke of a cello, hers is the sound of an outboard motor. That strobing physical language, heavily borrowed by Mick Jagger in his youth, was what stuck in your head as you left." These sentiments were shared by Jonathan Cohen (Billboard). He explains, "The point: this woman defies so much conventional wisdom that being in her presence for two-plus hours is a bit of a head trip."

As the tour moved to Europe, the praise continued. After Turner performed at the Lanxess Arena, Tom Horan (The Sunday Telegraph) pens Turner "showed why she is a goddess in Germany." He further says, "If you had to say what that feeling is with Turner, it's a feeling of triumph: I've come this far, I've done it – I'm still standing." Ian Gittins (The Guardian) gave her performance at The O_{2} Arena four out of five stars. He explains, "Crucially, her voice has not been damaged by its long layoff." His views were shared by Euan Ferguson (The Observer). He says, "It was a moment of perfect triumph: for the grit and feathers of her voice, for its still being there; and for her, not just still being alive, but for doing this."

== Broadcasts and recordings ==
The tour was chronicled on the CD/DVD released entitled, Tina Live. The recording was filmed on March 21 and 22 at the GelreDome football stadium in the Netherlands. The package includes an audio CD featuring selections from the show and a DVD. The CD/DVD combo was released in September 2009 (in Europe) and October (in the United States) also released on August 5, 2013, a Blu-ray was released in Mexico only with a 720p High Definition transfer but the release cuts four songs including Typical Male, What's Love Got To Do With It, We Don't Need Another Hero & Be Tender With Me Baby.

== Set list ==
The following set list was obtained from the October 1, 2008, show in Kansas City, Missouri. It does not represent all concerts for the duration of the tour.

1. "Steamy Windows"
2. "Typical Male"
3. "River Deep – Mountain High"
4. "What You Get Is What You See" (contains elements of "Overnight Sensation")
5. "Better Be Good to Me"
6. "Acid Queen" (contains elements of "Won't Get Fooled Again")
7. "What's Love Got to Do with It?"
8. "Private Dancer"
9. "We Don't Need Another Hero (Thunderdome)"
10. "Help"
11. "Let's Stay Together"
12. "Undercover Agent for the Blues"
13. "I Can't Stand the Rain"
14. "Jumpin' Jack Flash" / "It's Only Rock 'n Roll (But I Like It)"
15. "GoldenEye"
16. "Addicted to Love"
17. "The Best"
18. "Proud Mary"

Encore

19. "Nutbush City Limits"
20. "Be Tender with Me Baby"

== Tour dates ==
Date	City	Country	Venue	Attendance	Revenue
North America
October 1, 2008	Kansas City	United States	Sprint Center	26,884 / 26,884 (Note: Box score data is combined for shows on October 1 and 8, 2008.)	$2,831,553
October 3, 2008	Chicago	United States	United Center	25,138 / 25,138	$2,816,458
October 4, 2008	Chicago	United States	United Center	25,138 / 25,138	$2,816,458
October 6, 2008	Rosemont	United States	Allstate Arena	11,766 / 11,766	$1,234,115
October 8, 2008	Kansas City	United States	Sprint Center	—	—
October 9, 2008	Minneapolis	United States	Target Center	11,495 / 11,495	$1,118,743
October 13, 2008	Los Angeles	United States	Staples Center	27,066 / 27,066 (Note: Box score data is combined for shows on October 13 and 16, 2008.)	$2,932,205
October 14, 2008	Anaheim	United States	Honda Center	11,597 / 11,597	$1,135,039
October 16, 2008	Los Angeles	United States	Staples Center	—	—
October 19, 2008	San Jose	United States	HP Pavilion	24,126 / 24,126	$2,477,934
October 20, 2008	San Jose	United States	HP Pavilion	24,126 / 24,126	$2,477,934
October 22, 2008	Sacramento	United States	ARCO Arena	12,665 / 12,665	$1,343,774
October 24, 2008	Glendale	United States	Jobing.com Arena	13,129 / 13,129	$1,547,766
October 26, 2008	Dallas	United States	American Airlines Center	13,747 / 13,747	$1,508,500
October 27, 2008	Houston	United States	Toyota Center	11,950 / 11,950	$1,238,762
October 30, 2008	Miami	United States	American Airlines Arena	10,885 / 10,885	$1,043,106
November 2, 2008	Sunrise	United States	BankAtlantic Center	12,769 / 12,769	$1,468,461
November 5, 2008	Orlando	United States	Amway Arena	11,544 / 11,544	$1,224,534
November 9, 2008	Atlanta	United States	Philips Arena	26,028 / 26,028	$2,585,972
November 10, 2008	Atlanta	United States	Philips Arena	26,028 / 26,028	$2,585,972
November 13, 2008	Toronto	Canada	Air Canada Centre	44,587 / 44,587 (Note: Box score data is combined for shows on November 13 and December 12–13, 2008.)	$3,842,065
November 16, 2008	Boston	United States	TD Banknorth Garden	24,845 / 24,845	$2,632,184
November 17, 2008	Boston	United States	TD Banknorth Garden	24,845 / 24,845	$2,632,184
November 20, 2008	Auburn Hills	United States	The Palace of Auburn Hills	13,416 / 13,416	$976,816
November 23, 2008	Washington, D.C.	United States	Verizon Center	27,257 / 27,257	$3,016,512
November 24, 2008	Washington, D.C.	United States	Verizon Center	27,257 / 27,257	$3,016,512
November 26, 2008	Newark	United States	Prudential Center	25,917 / 25,917	$2,133,978
November 27, 2008	Newark	United States	Prudential Center	25,917 / 25,917	$2,133,978
November 29, 2008	Philadelphia	United States	Wachovia Spectrum	10,820 / 10,820	$909,968
December 1, 2008	New York City	United States	Madison Square Garden	13,887 / 13,887	$1,782,685
December 3, 2008	Uniondale	United States	Nassau Veterans Memorial Coliseum	25,005 / 25,005	$2,571,933
December 4, 2008	Uniondale	United States	Nassau Veterans Memorial Coliseum	25,005 / 25,005	$2,571,933
December 6, 2008	Hartford	United States	XL Center	11,848 / 11,848	$1,122,830
December 8, 2008	Montreal	Canada	Bell Centre	25,767 / 25,767	$2,325,184
December 10, 2008	Montreal	Canada	Bell Centre	25,767 / 25,767	$2,325,184
December 12, 2008	Toronto	Canada	Air Canada Centre	—	—
December 13, 2008	Toronto	Canada	Air Canada Centre	—	—
Europe
January 14, 2009	Cologne	Germany	Lanxess Arena	—N/a	—N/a
January 15, 2009	Cologne	Germany	Lanxess Arena	—N/a	—N/a
January 18, 2009	Cologne	Germany	Lanxess Arena	—N/a	—N/a
January 19, 2009	Cologne	Germany	Lanxess Arena	—N/a	—N/a
January 22, 2009	Antwerp	Belgium	Sportpaleis	54,573 / 54,573 (Note: Box score data is combined for shows on January 22–23 and April 30, 2009.)	$6,158,387
January 23, 2009	Antwerp	Belgium	Sportpaleis	54,573 / 54,573	$6,158,387
January 26, 2009	Berlin	Germany	O_{2} World	—N/a	—N/a
January 27, 2009	Berlin	Germany	O_{2} World	—N/a	—N/a
January 30, 2009	Hamburg	Germany	Color Line Arena	—N/a	—N/a
January 31, 2009	Hamburg	Germany	Color Line Arena	—N/a	—N/a
February 3, 2009	Hamburg	Germany	Color Line Arena	—N/a	—N/a
February 4, 2009	Hanover	Germany	TUI Arena	—N/a	—N/a
February 7, 2009	Vienna	Austria	Wiener Stadthalle	—N/a	—N/a
February 8, 2009	Vienna	Austria	Wiener Stadthalle	—N/a	—N/a
February 11, 2009	Antwerp	Belgium	Sportpaleis	—	—
February 12, 2009	Antwerp	Belgium	Sportpaleis	—	—
February 15, 2009	Zürich	Switzerland	Hallenstadion	—N/a	—N/a
February 16, 2009	Zürich	Switzerland	Hallenstadion	—N/a	—N/a
February 19, 2009	Mannheim	Germany	SAP Arena	—N/a	—N/a
February 20, 2009	Mannheim	Germany	SAP Arena	—N/a	—N/a
February 23, 2009	Munich	Germany	Olympiahalle	—N/a	—N/a
February 24, 2009	Munich	Germany	Olympiahalle	—N/a	—N/a
February 27, 2009	Munich	Germany	Olympiahalle	—N/a	—N/a
February 28, 2009	Munich	Germany	Olympiahalle	—N/a	—N/a
March 3, 2009	London	England	The O_{2} Arena	86,458 / 89,080 (Note: Box score data is combined for shows on March 3–4 and 7-8 and May 3, 2009.)	$9,207,835
March 4, 2009	London	England	The O_{2} Arena	86,458 / 89,080	$9,207,835
March 7, 2009	London	England	The O_{2} Arena	86,458 / 89,080	$9,207,835
March 8, 2009	London	England	The O_{2} Arena	86,458 / 89,080	$9,207,835
March 16, 2009	Paris	France	Palais Omnisports de Paris-Bercy	32,834 / 35,656 (Note: Box score data is combined for shows on March 16–17 and April 29, 2009.)	$4,235,687
March 17, 2009	Paris	France	Palais Omnisports de Paris-Bercy	32,834 / 35,656	$4,235,687
March 21, 2009	Arnhem	Netherlands	GelreDome	88,693 / 96,499 (Note: Box score data is combined for shows on March 21–22 and May 2, 2009.)	$8,430,511
March 22, 2009	Arnhem	Netherlands	GelreDome	88,693 / 96,499	$8,430,511
March 26, 2009	Dublin	Ireland	The O_{2}	—N/a	—N/a
March 27, 2009	Dublin	Ireland	The O_{2}	—N/a	—N/a
March 30, 2009	Manchester	England	Manchester Evening News Arena	—N/a	—N/a
March 31, 2009	Manchester	England	Manchester Evening News Arena	—N/a	—N/a
April 3, 2009	Manchester	England	Manchester Evening News Arena	—N/a	—N/a
April 4, 2009	Manchester	England	Manchester Evening News Arena	—N/a	—N/a
April 7, 2009	Birmingham	England	National Indoor Arena	—N/a	—N/a
April 8, 2009	Birmingham	England	National Indoor Arena	—N/a	—N/a
April 11, 2009	Dublin	Ireland	The O_{2}	—N/a	—N/a
April 12, 2009	Dublin	Ireland	The O_{2}	—N/a	—N/a
April 17, 2009	Fornebu	Norway	Telenor Arena	15,014 / 17,050	$1,737,664
April 19, 2009	Stockholm	Sweden	Ericsson Globe	19,481 / 21,748	$2,374,688
April 20, 2009	Stockholm	Sweden	Ericsson Globe	19,481 / 21,748	$2,374,688
April 23, 2009	Helsinki	Finland	Hartwall Areena	22,501 / 22,501	$3,441,843
April 24, 2009	Helsinki	Finland	Hartwall Areena	22,501 / 22,501	$3,441,843
April 27, 2009	Prague	Czech Republic	O_{2} Arena	15,812 / 16,000	$1,391,282
April 29, 2009	Paris	France	Palais Omnisports de Paris-Bercy	—	—
April 30, 2009	Antwerp	Belgium	Sportpaleis	—	—
May 2, 2009	Arnhem	Netherlands	GelreDome	—	—
May 3, 2009 (Note: Originally scheduled for March 11, 2009.)	London	England	The O_{2} Arena	—	—
May 5, 2009 (Note: Originally scheduled for March 12, 2009.)	Sheffield	England	Sheffield Arena	—N/a	—N/a
Total				822,083 / 827,245 (98%)	$86,372,137

== Personnel ==
Main

- Executive Tour Producer: Roger Davies
- Executive Tour Director: Nick Cua
- Associate Producer: Toni Basil and Baz Halpin
- Tour Coordinator: Bill Buntain and Bonus Management Inc.
- Creative Director: Baz Halpin
- Lighting Director: Kathy Beer
- Musical Director: Ollie Marland
- Video Director: Larn Poland
- Choreographer: Toni Basil
- Costume Design: Bob Mackie
- Lighting Design: Baz Halpin / Sean McKinney
- Production Design: Baz Halpin and Mark Fisher
- Set Design: Mark Fisher
- Video Design: Olivier Goulet (Geodezik)
- Production Manager: Malcom Weldon
- Project Manager: Nick Evans
- Stage Manager: Seth Goldstein
- Tour Manager: Donna Parise
- Technical Drawings: Technical Drawings
- Ticket Coordinator: Donna Parise
- Production Assistant: Dori Venza
- Production Consultant: Jake Berry (Higher Fader)

Crew

- Head Carpenter: Timothy Woo
- Carpenter: Alan Doyle, Robert Gallegos, Jacque Richard, Colin Paynter, Daniel Witmyer and Christopher Woo
- Engineer: Graham Holwill
- Monitor Engineer: J. Summers
- Monitor Tech: Richard Schonedel
- FOH Sound Engineer: David Natale
- Lighting Crew Chief: Ian Tucker / Sean McKinney
- Lighting Crew: Thomas Bider, Doug Eder, Andrew David Johnson, Mike Merle and Steven "Six" Schwind
- Head Rigger: Bart Durbin
- Rigger:Stephen Chambers and Paul Ingswergen
- Motion Control: Jacque Richard
- Video Content: Nick Morris
- Video Consultant: Bob Brigham
- Video Playback: David Boisvert
- Camera Operator: Tracy Calderon, Nick Ruocco, Nicholas Weldon and Shawn Worlow
- Audio Technician: Sean Baca, Jeremy Bolton and Joshua Weibel
- Drum Technician: Gary Grimm
- Guitar Technician: John Ciasulli
- Keyboard Technician: Glenn Erwin
- Programmer: Glenn Erwin
- Assistant (Choreography): Nina Flagg, Marissa Labog and Katie Orr
- Assistant (Costume Design): Joe McFate
- Wardrobe: Helen "Mel" Dykes, Julie Frankham, Bonnie Flesland and Jennifer Jacobs
- Footwear: Empori Armani, Giorgio Armani, Manolo Blahnick and Christian Louboutin
- Hair Design/Styling; Serena Radaelli
- Hair: Arthur John
- Make Up: Yvette Beebe
- Chauffeur: Jose Gomez
- Chef: Didier Uebersax
- Dressing Room: Lyndsey Burns
- Executive Assistant: Rhonda Graam
- Personal Assistant: Julie Frankham
- Personal Wellness: Jarod Chapman
- Director of Security: Bernard "Bernd" Belka
- Venue Security Director: Anthony Robinson

Band

- Guitar: Laurie Wisefield and John Miles
- Bass: Warren McRae
- Drums: Jack Bruno
- Percussions: Euge Groove
- Keyboards: Ollie Marland, Joel Campbell and Euge Groove
- Saxophone: Euge Groove
- Backing vocals: Joel Campbell, Stacy Campbell, Lisa Fischer, John Miles, Ollie Marland and Laurie Wisefield
- Dancers ("Flowers"): Djeneba Aduayom, Solange Guenier, Ferly Prado and Clare Turton
- Ninjas: Philip Sahagun, Jesse "Justice" Smith, Danny Sre and Xin Wuku

Production

- Airfreight: Joe Allen (Rock–It Cargo USA Inc.)
- Buses: Trent Hemphill and Mark Larson (Hemphill Bros Coach)
- Bus Driver: Tim Brannon, Andy Clark, Bennet Bee Haley, Terry Ford, Ty Saunders and Allen Sowersby
- Trucking (United States): Bob Higgins (Artisan)
- Trucking (Europe): Mark Guterres (Transam Trucking Ltd)
- Truck Driver: Bob Bramel, Carl Hereford, Cody Chase, Danny Frederick, Earl Edwards, Ed Lester, James Honke, Jeff Swearingen, Jeremy Daniel, John Thompson, Kenny Kid, Kyle Haveraneck, Paul Arnold, Randy Carlisle, Ray Bidler, Robert Jackson, Ron Templin and Steve "Tex" Sallee
- Audio: Thomas Huntington
- Electrics: John Zajonc(Legacy Power)
- Lighting: Micky Curbishly (PRG Lighting)
- Pyrotechnics: Lorenzo Cornacchia (Pyrotek)
- Radio: Jeremy Schilling (Road Radios)
- Rigging: John Fletcher and Bob Savage (Five Points Rigging)
- Set Construction: Adam Davis, James "Winky" Fairoth and Michael Tait (Tait Towers)
- Sound: Greg Hall (Clair Brothers Audio)

Business

- Accountant: Bill Buntain
- Business Management: Nancy Chapman, Kevin Carretta and Patty DeFrancesco (Chapman, Bird and Gray)
- Immigration: David King (TCG New York and London)
- Insurance: Bob Taylor and Paul Twomey (Robertson Taylor Insurance Brokers Ltd)
- Legal (United States): Carla Good, Gregg Harrison, Don Passman and Gene Salomon (Gang, Tyre, Ramer & Brown Inc.)
- Legal (Europe): Evan Lawson (Michael Simkins LLP)
- Management: Roger Davies, Lisa Garrett, Steven Manzano, Delwyn Rees and Irene Taylor
- Promotion (North America): Doug Clouse, Paul Gongaware, Jay Lotz, John Meglan, Amy Morrison and Jon States (Concerts West/AEG Live)
- Promotion (Europe): Doris Dixon, Ben Martin, Barrie Marshall and Jenny Marshall (Marshall Arts Ltd)
- Publicity (United States): Michele Schweitzer (M–Relations LLC)
- Publicity (Europe): Bernard Doherty (LD Communications)
- Record Company (United States): Capitol Records
- Record Company (Europe): EMI
- Travel: Ken Bruce (Bruvion Travel/Concierge Services), Jason Couvillion, Scott Patton, John Rukavina and Jeff Torres
- Travel (Private Charter): Kim Scolari (Jet Productions Inc)
- Tour Sponsor: Amway Global, Steve Lieberman, Whitten Pell and Cody Lieberman
- Communications: Doug Stringer (Casbah)
- Itineraries: Knowhere Itineraries
- Merchandising: Tom Donnell (Bravado International Group)
- Tour Passes: Cube Services Inc.
- Art Direction: Jeri Heiden
- Photography: Andrew Macpherson

== See also ==
- List of highest-grossing concert tours by women
