= Paradise Is Here =

1987 single by Tina Turner

Single by Tina Turner

from the album Break Every Rule
- A-side: "Back Where You Started"
- B-side: "In the Midnight Hour" (live)
- Released: September 1, 1987
- Recorded: 1986
- Genre: Pop rock
- Length: 5:35
- Label: Capitol
- Songwriter(s): Paul Brady
- Producer(s): Mark Knopfler

Tina Turner singles chronology
| "Tearing Us Apart" (1987) | "Paradise Is Here" (1987) | "Afterglow" (1987) |

"Paradise Is Here" is a song written by Paul Brady and first recorded by Tina Turner, for her album Break Every Rule. Brady subsequently released his own version on his 1987 album Primitive Dance, and it has also been covered by Cher for her twenty-first album It's a Man's World.

In a 2023 interview, Paul Brady cited it as one of the songs that "transformed his life by giving him financial stability" through Turner's recording and the attendant fame.

== Tina Turner version ==
Tina Turner's recording of the track features guitar by Mark Knopfler of Dire Straits (who also produced) and was included on her 1986 album Break Every Rule. It was released as a single in Europe and found minor success in the UK. Instead of a remix, the 12" single featured a seven-and-a-half-minute live version from Turner's 1986/1987 Break Every Rule Tour, on which the track was one of the encores. An edited version of this same recording was later included as the closing track on her 1988 album Tina Live in Europe, omitting most of the closing saxophone solo. The full-length live recording was initially unreleased on CD, but became available as part of the music video on Turner's All the Best – The Live Collection DVD.

In 2022, a Deluxe Edition reissue of Break Every Rule was released in several variations, ultimately including three different live versions of "Paradise is Here."

=== Music video ===
The official music video for the song, a live performance piece featuring the same recording as the 12" single, was directed by Andy Morahan.

=== Charts ===
| Chart (1987) | Peak position |
|---|---|
| Austria (Ö3 Austria Top 40) | 25 |
| Germany (Official German Charts) | 31 |
| Ireland (IRMA) | 21 |
| UK Singles (OCC) | 78 |

== Cher version ==
"Paradise Is Here"

Single by Cher

from the album It's a Man's World
- Released: December 3, 1996
- Recorded: 1995
- Studio: Elephant Studios (London, England)
- Genre: Pop; R&B
- Length: 4:40
- Label: Reprise
- Songwriter(s): Paul Brady
- Producer(s): Stephen Lipson

Cher singles chronology
| "The Sun Ain't Gonna Shine Anymore" (1996) | "Paradise Is Here" (1996) | "Believe" (1998) |

Licensed audio
- "Paradise Is Here" on YouTube

"Paradise Is Here" was the second North American single by American singer-actress Cher from her studio album, It's a Man's World. It was released on December 3, 1996, by Reprise Records. The song did not crack the US Hot 100, but became a top 20 US club hit, peaking at number eleven. Cher performed the song on The RuPaul Show in 1997.

=== Track listing ===
- US CD single
1. "Paradise Is Here" (Single Mix) – 4:05
2. "Paradise Is Here" (Junior's Arena Anthem) – 10:42
3. "Paradise Is Here" (Runway Mix) – 8:32
4. "Paradise Is Here" (Glow Stick Mix) – 8:30
5. "Paradise Is Here" (Give Me The Night Dub) – 8:30
6. "Paradise Is Here" (Sunrise Mix) – 6:50
7. "Paradise Is Here" (Eurodance Mix) – 5:54
8. "Paradise Is Here" (Garage Revival Mix) – 7:32
- US 12" single
1. "Paradise Is Here" (Junior's Arena Anthem) – 10:45
2. "Paradise Is Here" (Glow Stick Mix) – 8:33
3. "Paradise Is Here" (Runway Mix) – 8:32
4. "Paradise Is Here" (Give Me The Night Dub) – 8:35

=== Charts ===
| Chart (1996–1997) | Peak position |
|---|---|
| US Dance Club Songs (Billboard) | 11 |
| US Hot Dance Singles Sales (Billboard) | 27 |
