= Afterglow (Tina Turner song) =

Single by Tina Turner

from the album Break Every Rule
- Released: 1987
- Recorded: 1986
- Genre: Pop
- Length: 4:30
- Label: Capitol Records
- Songwriters: Terry Britten; Graham Lyle
- Producer: Terry Britten

Tina Turner singles chronology
"Paradise Is Here" (1987)	"Afterglow" (1987)	"Nutbush City Limits (Live)" (1988)

"Afterglow" is a song recorded by Tina Turner, written and produced by Terry Britten and Graham Lyle, and produced by Britten. It appeared on her studio album Break Every Rule (1986), and featured Steve Winwood on keyboards. The song was the eighth and final song from the album to be released as a single, if only in the United States. It failed to crack the US Hot 100, but it reached number 5 on the US dance charts and number 20 on the Maxi Single Sales chart. A promo video for the track was filmed as part of the Break Every Rule TV special in 1986, in which it was the opening number. It shows Turner performing the song in her dressing room at the club Le Zero in Paris as she is preparing to go on stage.

== Versions and remixes ==
- Album version – 4:39
- 7" Remix
- Vocal Dance Mix – 7:10
- Glowing Dub – 6:14
- Tina's House Mix – 6:37
- Tinapella – 4:41

== Personnel ==
- Tina Turner – lead vocals
- Nick Glennie-Smith – keyboards
- Steve Winwood – synthesizer solo
- Terry Britten – programming, guitars, bass
- Jack Bruno – drums
- Tessa Niles – backing vocals

== Charts ==
Chart (1987)	Peak position
US Dance Club Songs (Billboard)	5
