= Break Every Rule =

Studio album by Tina Turner
- Released: September 8, 1986
- Recorded: 1986
- Genres: Pop rock; country; R&B
- Length: 50:13
- Label: Capitol
- Producers: Bryan Adams; Terry Britten; Neil Dorfsman; Mark Knopfler; Bob Clearmountain; Rupert Hine

Tina Turner chronology
Private Dancer (1984)	Break Every Rule (1986)	Tina Live in Europe (1988)

Singles from Break Every Rule
- 1. "Typical Male" Released: August 11, 1986; 2. "Two People" Released: October 27, 1986; 3. "What You Get Is What You See" Released: January 1987; 4. "Girls" Released: February 2, 1987 (NL); 5. "Break Every Rule" Released: April 1987; 6. "Back Where You Started" Released: August 1987 (Can); 7. "Paradise Is Here" Released: September 1, 1987 (EU); 8. "Afterglow" Released: October 1987 (US)

Professional ratings
Review scores
Source	Rating
AllMusic	3/5 stars
Robert Christgau	B+

Break Every Rule is the sixth solo studio album by Tina Turner. It was released on September 8, 1986, through Capitol Records. It was the follow-up to Turner's globally successful comeback album, Private Dancer, released two years earlier. The lead single "Typical Male" peaked at number two for three consecutive weeks in October 1986, while "Two People" and "What You Get Is What You See" reached the top 20. "Back Where You Started" earned Turner her third consecutive Grammy Award for Best Rock Vocal Performance, Female in 1987. It was Turner's first solo album of original songs.

== Composition ==
The original A-side of the vinyl album was entirely produced by Graham Lyle and Terry Britten, the team behind Turner's 1984 single "What's Love Got to Do with It", while side B included tracks produced by Bryan Adams, Bob Clearmountain, Mark Knopfler and Rupert Hine. Out of the album's eleven tracks, eight were released as singles, either in Europe or the United States or both; "Typical Male" (U.S. No. 2) featuring Phil Collins on drums, "What You Get Is What You See" (U.S. No. 13), "Two People" (Spain No. 1, U.S. R&B No. 18), David Bowie's "Girls" (Poland No. 11), "Back Where You Started" (U.S. Rock No. 18) co-written and produced by Bryan Adams, "Afterglow" (U.S. Dance No. 2) featuring Steve Winwood on keyboards, "Break Every Rule" (Poland No. 15) co-written and produced by Rupert Hine and "Paradise Is Here" (Ireland No. 24).

Most of the 12-inch singles that were released from the album included extended or alternate mixes, live versions and/or non-album tracks, many of which would not see a release on compact disc until the Deluxe Edition box set of Break Every Rule in 2022. Turner also recorded other tracks during the sessions for the album with Steve Lillywhite and Bryan Adams; "Don't Turn Around", produced by Adams, was released as a B-side, but the others remain unreleased.

Following the release of the Break Every Rule album Turner recorded the duet "Tearing Us Apart" with Eric Clapton, included on his Phil Collins-produced 1986 album August and also issued as a single in early 1987.

== Commercial performance ==
Break Every Rule was a commercial success worldwide. It reached No. 4 on the Billboard 200, No. 2 on the UK Albums Chart and No. 1 in Switzerland, and also Germany (for 12 weeks). The album sold over 5 million copies worldwide within its first year of release. The RIAA certified Break Every Rule platinum, denoting 1 million shipments in the United States. It was also certified 2× platinum in countries including Germany, Switzerland, Austria, and Canada.

== Tour ==
Turner undertook a huge world tour to promote the album, including a record-breaking date in Rio de Janeiro in which she played to 180,000 people. The concert was filmed and released on home video. Further dates from the European leg of her world tour were recorded and released as the live album Tina Live in Europe in 1988, which won a Grammy Award for Best Female Rock Vocal Performance.

== Track listing ==
Standard edition
No.	Title	Writer(s)	Producers	Length
1.	"Typical Male"	Terry Britten; Graham Lyle	Britten	4:18
2.	"What You Get Is What You See"	Britten; Lyle	Britten	4:31
3.	"Two People"	Britten; Lyle	Britten	4:11
4.	"Till the Right Man Comes Along"	Britten; Lyle	Britten	4:11
5.	"Afterglow"	Britten; Lyle	Britten	4:30
6.	"Girls"	David Bowie; Erdal Kızılçay	Britten	4:56
7.	"Back Where You Started"	Bryan Adams; Jim Vallance	Adams; Bob Clearmountain	4:27
8.	"Break Every Rule"	Rupert Hine; Jeannette Obstoj	Hine	4:02
9.	"Overnight Sensation"	Mark Knopfler	Knopfler; Neil Dorfsman	4:40
10.	"Paradise Is Here"	Paul Brady	Knopfler; Dorfsman	5:35
11.	"I'll Be Thunder"	Hine; Obstoj	Hine	5:21

2022 expanded edition bonus disc
No.	Title	Writer(s)	Producers	Length
1.	"Don't Turn Around"	Albert Hammond; Diane Warren	Adams; Clearmountain	4:16
2.	"Havin' a Party"	Sam Cooke	Martyn Ware	3:57
3.	"Take Me to the River"	Al Green; Mabon Lewis Hodges	Ware	4:03
4.	"Typical Male" (12" Dance Mix)	Britten; Lyle	Britten	7:07
5.	"Two People" (Dance Mix)	Britten; Lyle	Britten	8:24
6.	"What You Get Is What You See" (Extended Dance Mix)	Britten; Lyle	Britten	6:28
7.	"The Tina Turner Montage Mix"	Various	Les 'The Mixdoctor' Adams	8:54
8.	"Break Every Rule" (Extended Dance Mix)	Hine; Obstoj	Hine	8:45
9.	"Afterglow" (Vocal Dance Mix)	Britten; Lyle	Britten; Murray Elias; Justin Strauss	7:09
10.	"Paradise Is Here" (Live Full Length Version)	John Hudson	Knopfler; Dorfsman	7:25

2022 deluxe edition third bonus disc (Tina Live in Rio '88 CD)
No.	Title	Length

2022 deluxe edition fourth bonus disc (Tina Live in Rio '88 DVD)
No.	Title	Length

2022 deluxe edition fifth bonus disc (Camden Palace, London '86 and Promo Videos DVD)
No.	Title	Length

== B-sides ==
Title	Single(s)
"Don't Turn Around"	"Typical Male"
"Havin' a Party"	"Two People"
"Take Me to the River"	"Girls" and "What You Get Is What You See"
"In the Midnight Hour" (live)	"Paradise Is Here"

== Personnel ==
Musicians

- Tina Turner – lead vocals, backing vocals (8, 11)
- Nick Glennie-Smith – keyboards (1–6), string arrangements (4)
- Billy Livsey – keyboards (3)
- Steve Winwood – synthesizer solo (5)
- Bryan Adams – acoustic piano (7), guitar (7), backing vocals (7)
- Tommy Mandel – Hammond organ (7)
- Rupert Hine – all instruments (8, 11), arrangements (8, 11), backing vocals (8, 11)
- Guy Fletcher – keyboards (9, 10)
- Albert Boekholt – programming (9, 10)
- Terry Britten – guitars (1–6), bass (1–6), backing vocals (1, 3, 4), programming (2, 4, 5)
- Graham Lyle – mandolin (2)
- Keith Scott – lead guitar (7)
- Jamie West-Oram – guitars (8, 11)
- Mark Knopfler – guitars (9, 10)
- Dave Taylor – bass (7)
- Micky Feat – bass (9)
- Phil Collins – drums (1, 6)
- Jack Bruno – drums (3, 5)
- Mickey Curry – drums (7)
- Jamie Lane – drums (9)
- Garry Katell – percussion (6)
- Jim Vallance – percussion (7)
- Frank Ricotti – percussion (9, 10)
- Tim Cappello – saxophone solo (1)
- Branford Marsalis – soprano saxophone (10)
- Tessa Niles – backing vocals (1, 4, 5)
- Samantha Brown – backing vocals (10)
- Margo Buchanan – backing vocals (10)
- Jimmy Chambers – backing vocals (10)
- George Chandler – backing vocals (10)

Production

- Terry Britten – producer (1–6)
- Bryan Adams – producer (7)
- Bob Clearmountain – producer (7), engineer (7), mixing (7)
- Rupert Hine – producer (8, 11)
- Mark Knopfler – producer (9, 10)
- Neil Dorfsman – producer (9, 10), engineer (9, 10)
- Richard Elen – sound designer (1–6)
- John Hudson – engineer (1–6), mixing (1–6)
- Stephen W. Tayler – engineer (8, 11), mixing (8, 11)
- Mike Ging – assistant engineer (1–6)
- Paul Hamilton – assistant engineer (7)
- Mark McKenna – assistant engineer (7)
- Richard Moakes – assistant engineer (7, 9, 10)
- Steve Rinkoff – assistant engineer (7)
- Andrew Scarth – assistant engineer (8, 11)
- Stephen Marcussen – mastering at Precision Lacquer (Hollywood, California).
- Stylorouge – design
- Herb Ritts – photography
- Jenni Bolton – stylist, personal assistant
- Phyllis Cohen – make-up
- Roger Davies – director

== Charts ==
=== Weekly charts ===
1986 weekly chart performance for Break Every Rule
Chart (1986)	Peak position
Australian Albums (Kent Music Report)	11
Austrian Albums (Ö3 Austria)	2
Canada Top Albums/CDs (RPM)	4
Canadian Albums (The Record)	3
Dutch Albums (Album Top 100)	6
European Albums (Music & Media)	2
Finnish Albums (Suomen virallinen lista)	1
German Albums (Offizielle Top 100)	1
Icelandic Albums (Tónlist)	4
Italian Albums (Musica e dischi)	7
New Zealand Albums (RMNZ)	4
Norwegian Albums (VG-lista)	2
Spanish Albums (AFYVE)	1
Swedish Albums (Sverigetopplistan)	2
Swiss Albums (Schweizer Hitparade)	1
UK Albums (Official Charts)	2
US Billboard 200	4
US Top R&B/Hip-Hop Albums (Billboard)	7
US Cash Box Top Pop Albums	10

2022–2023 weekly chart performance for Break Every Rule
Chart (2022–2023)	Peak position
Austrian Albums (Ö3 Austria)	46
Belgian Albums (Ultratop Flanders)	73
Belgian Albums (Ultratop Wallonia)	127
German Albums (Offizielle Top 100)	25
Hungarian Albums (MAHASZ)	15
Spanish Albums (Promusicae)	61
Swiss Albums (Schweizer Hitparade)	26
UK Album Downloads (Official Charts)	57

=== Year-end charts ===
1986 year-end chart performance for Break Every Rule
Chart (1986)	Position
Canada Top Albums/CDs (RPM)	28
Dutch Albums (Album Top 100)	44
European Albums (Music & Media)	41
German Albums (Offizielle Top 100)	23
Norwegian Fall Period Albums (VG-lista)	6
Spanish Albums (AFYVE)	19
Swiss Albums (Schweizer Hitparade)	21
UK Albums (Gallup)	48

1987 year-end chart performance for Break Every Rule
Chart (1987)	Position
Australian Albums (Kent Music Report)	53
Austrian Albums (Ö3 Austria)	3
Dutch Albums (Album Top 100)	84
European Albums (Music & Media)	12
German Albums (Offizielle Top 100)	3
Swiss Albums (Schweizer Hitparade)	8
US Billboard 200	37
US Top R&B/Hip-Hop Albums (Billboard)	46

== Certifications ==
Certifications for Break Every Rule
Region	Certification	Certified units/sales
Austria (IFPI Austria)	2× Platinum	100,000^{*}
Brazil (Pro-Música Brasil)	2× Gold	200,000^{*}
Canada (Music Canada)	2× Platinum	200,000^{^}
Finland (Musiikkituottajat)	Gold	30,773
France (SNEP)	Gold	100,000^{*}
Germany (BVMI)	2× Platinum	1,000,000^{^}
Netherlands (NVPI)	Gold	50,000^{^}
New Zealand (RMNZ)	Platinum	15,000^{^}
Spain (Promusicae)	Platinum	100,000^{^}
Switzerland (IFPI Switzerland)	2× Platinum	100,000^{^}
United Kingdom (BPI)	Platinum	300,000^{^}
United States (RIAA)	Platinum	1,000,000^{^}
^{*} Sales figures based on certification alone.^{^} Shipments figures based on certification alone.
