= What You Get Is What You See =

Single by Tina Turner

from the album Break Every Rule
- Released: January 1987
- Recorded: 1986
- Genre: Rock; country rock
- Length: 4:31
- Label: Capitol
- Songwriters: Terry Britten; Graham Lyle
- Producer: Britten

Tina Turner singles chronology
"Girls" (1986)	"What You Get Is What You See" (1987)	"Break Every Rule" (1987)

Music video
- "What You Get Is What You See" on YouTube

"What You Get Is What You See" is a song by recording artist Tina Turner from her album Break Every Rule (1986). The 12" single included three versions of the song, the Extended Dance Mix, the Extended Rock Mix and a live version recorded in London in November 1986. A different live recording of the song was later used as the opening track on Turner's 1988 album Tina Live in Europe. She also included it in her 2009 live album Tina Live. It was recorded during Turner's 50th Anniversary Tour. The track is from the March 21, 2009 live show at the GelreDome in Arnhem, Netherlands.

The music video for the song was directed by Peter Care, and filmed on-location in Coachella Valley, California.

== Background ==
The song was written by the Terry Britten and Graham Lyle team and was notably different from the three previous singles that they had written for Turner, "What's Love Got to Do with It", "We Don't Need Another Hero" and "Two People", as it was an up-tempo country-tinged rock track. The song was originally to feature a guitar solo by Eric Clapton, but Clapton's contribution was accidentally recorded an octave too low; Terry Britten ultimately played the guitar solo himself. Tina Turner said in an interview that "What You Get Is What You See" is her favorite song from the album.

== Versions and remixes ==
- Single edit – 3:57
- Album version – 4:31
- Extended Dance Mix – 6:28
- Extended Rock Mix – 5:55
- Live Version – 4:47

== Personnel ==
- Tina Turner – lead vocals
- Nick Glennie-Smith – keyboards
- Terry Britten – programming, guitars, bass
- Graham Lyle – mandolin

== Charts ==
=== Weekly charts ===
Chart (1987)	Peak position
Australia (Kent Music Report)	15
Austria (Ö3 Austria Top 40)	23
Belgium (Ultratop 50 Flanders)	38
Canada Top Singles (RPM)	23
Europe (European Hot 100 Singles)	18
Germany (Official German Charts)	17
Ireland (IRMA)	16
New Zealand (Recorded Music NZ)	41
UK Singles (Official Charts)	30
US Billboard Hot 100	13
US Cash Box Top 100	21
Chart (1989)	Peak position
Australia (ARIA)	57

=== Year-end charts ===
Chart (1987)	Peak position
Australia (Kent Music Report)	92

== Covers ==
The song has been covered many times including by Canadian country music group Straight Clean & Simple and a single for the band taken from their 1992 album Iron Lady. It was also covered by Scottish / Irish country artist Lisa McHugh. Her cover appears in her 2014 album A Life That's Good.

== In popular culture ==
"What You Get Is What You See" was popular in Australia, where in 1989 it was used in a campaign for the New South Wales Rugby League. They later used the Tina Turner song "The Best" in another campaign.

== See also ==
- WYGIWYS, a variant of WYSIWYG (See WYSIWYG#Variations)
