= Break Every Rule (song) =

Single by Tina Turner

from the album Break Every Rule
- B-side: "Take Me to the River"
- Released: April 1987
- Recorded: 1986
- Genre: Pop rock
- Length: 4:02
- Label: Capitol
- Songwriters: Rupert Hine; Jeannette Obstoj
- Producer: Rupert Hine

Tina Turner singles chronology
"What You Get Is What You See" (1987)	"Break Every Rule" (1987)	"Tearing Us Apart" (1987)

Music video
- "Break Every Rule" on YouTube

"Break Every Rule" is a song by recording artist Tina Turner. It was the title track to both Turner's 1986 album of the same name and the name of her 1987–88 world tour. It was released as the fifth single from the album in April 1987 to support the ongoing tour. The song found limited success on the US and UK singles charts, although reached as far as #21 on the Austrian Top 40 Charts. The music video shows Turner performing on stage as well as behind-the-scenes footage of Turner and her band from the tour. The song was written and produced by British composer Rupert Hine, with lyrics co-written by his then partner Jeanette Obstoj, who had previously composed "I Might Have Been Queen" which was featured on Turner's Private Dancer album. The "Break Every Rule" 12" single included both an Extended Dance Mix and an Extended Rock Mix.

== Music video ==
The official music video for the song was directed by Andy Morahan and produced by Luc Roeg. It was filmed during the Break Every Rule Tour in Germany and features Turner performing the song on stage interspersed with behind-the-scenes footage of Turner and her band.

== Versions and remixes ==
- 7" edit – 3:48
- Album version – 4:02
- Extended Dance Mix – 8:46
- Extended Rock Mix – 7:02

== Personnel ==
- Tina Turner – lead and backing vocals
- Rupert Hine – all other instruments, backing vocals
- Jamie West-Oram – guitars

== Chart performance ==
Chart (1987)	Peak position
Australia (Kent Music Report)	60
Austria (Ö3 Austria Top 40)	21
Europe (European Hot 100 Singles)	44
Germany (Official German Charts)	38
UK Singles (Official Charts)	43
US Billboard Hot 100	74
US Cash Box Top 100	78
