= Back Where You Started =

Single by Tina Turner

from the album Break Every Rule
- B-side: "Paradise Is Here"
- Released: September 1986 (US promo): August 1987 (Canada)
- Genre: Rock, hard rock
- Length: 4:27
- Label: Capitol
- Songwriters: Bryan Adams, Jim Vallance
- Producers: Bryan Adams, Bob Clearmountain

Tina Turner singles chronology
"Typical Male" (1986)	"Back Where You Started" (1986)	"Two People" (1986)

"Back Where You Started" is a popular album track by rock/soul singer Tina Turner, from her Platinum-certified Break Every Rule album. The song was released as a single in Canada only, and as a radio-promo disc in the United States.

The song was written by Bryan Adams and Jim Vallance, and produced by Adams and Bob Clearmountain. It was the second collaboration between Turner and Adams, their first being the 1985 hit "It's Only Love". Although "Back Where You Started" was never released commercially as a single in the US, it was a hit on the Rock Chart and won Turner a Grammy Award for Best Rock Vocal Performance, Female in 1987.

== Personnel ==
- Tina Turner – lead vocals
- Bryan Adams – acoustic piano, guitars, backing vocals
- Tommy Mandel – Hammond organ
- Keith Scott – lead guitar
- Dave Taylor – bass
- Mickey Curry – drums
- Jim Vallance – percussion

== Chart performance ==
Chart (1986–87)	Peak position
Canada Top Singles (RPM)	85
US Mainstream Rock (Billboard)	18
