= Tearing Us Apart =

Single by Eric Clapton and Tina Turner

from the album August
- B-side: "Hold On"
- Released: 8 June 1987
- Recorded: 1986
- Genre: Pop, rock
- Length: 3:38 (7" Version); 4:14 (Album version)
- Label: Warner Bros.
- Songwriters: Eric Clapton; Greg Phillinganes
- Producer: Phil Collins

Eric Clapton singles chronology
| "Behind the Mask" (1987) | "Tearing Us Apart" (1987) | "Pretending" (1989) |

Tina Turner singles chronology
| "Break Every Rule" (1986) | "Tearing Us Apart" (1987) | "Paradise Is Here" (1987) |

"Tearing Us Apart" is a song recorded by English blues rock guitarist and singer Eric Clapton on his 1986 album August, produced by Phil Collins. The song was about "the committee", the group of Pattie Boyd's friends whom Clapton blamed for coming between Pattie and him. "Tearing Us Apart" was a duet with Tina Turner and was released as the second single from the album in mid-1987, following "Behind the Mask". The song did not chart on the US Billboard Hot 100, but was a minor hit in the UK. The song has been included on several setlists of Clapton's live performances in the late 1980s and throughout the 1990s; performed by other female vocalists such as Katie Kissoon, Tessa Niles, Shaun Murphy, Tracy Ackerman, Sheryl Crow, Sharon White and Michelle John (since 2011). Clapton resurrected the song for his 11-night residency at the Royal Albert Hall in May/June 2011 and his European/South American tours from February 14 to October 16. Most recently, Clapton has performed the song in concert in 2022.

Turner and Clapton performed the track as part of the 1986 Prince's Trust All-Star Rock Concert in London's Wembley Arena to celebrate the first 10 years of the Trust, then with a band including, among others, Phil Collins, Elton John, Mark Knopfler, Bryan Adams, Rod Stewart, and Paul McCartney. The live version was later released on the Royal Concert charity album in 1987, issued by The Prince's Trust.

A second live recording of the track from Tina Turner's 1986/1987 Break Every Rule Tour, with Clapton guesting on guitar and vocals, was later included on her 1988 album Tina Live in Europe.

== Personnel ==
- Eric Clapton – lead vocals, harmony vocals, rhythm guitar, lead guitar, slide guitar
- Tina Turner – lead vocals, harmony vocals
- Greg Phillinganes – keyboards, synthesizer, backing vocals
- Larry Williams – synthesizer programming
- Nathan East – bass guitar
- Phil Collins – drums, percussion, backing vocals

== Versions and mixes ==
- 7" Edit - 3:38
- Album Version a.k.a. Full Length Mix (12") - 4:14

== Chart performance ==
| Chart (1987) | Peak position |
|---|---|
| Belgium (Ultratop 50 Flanders) | 34 |
| Netherlands (Dutch Top 40) | 29 |
| Netherlands (Single Top 100) | 30 |
| UK Singles (OCC) | 56 |
| US Mainstream Rock (Billboard) | 5 |
