= Two People (song) =

Single by Tina Turner

from the album Break Every Rule
- B-side: "Havin' a Party"
- Released: October 27, 1986
- Genre: Pop; R&B
- Length: 4:11
- Label: Capitol
- Songwriters: Terry Britten; Graham Lyle
- Producer: Terry Britten

Tina Turner singles chronology
| "Back Where You Started" (1986) | "Two People" (1986) | "Girls" (1986) |

Music video
- "Two People" on YouTube

"Two People" is a song by recording artist Tina Turner. It was written by Terry Britten and Graham Lyle, with production helmed by the former, and released as the second single from her sixth solo album Break Every Rule (1986).

== Versions and remixes ==
- Album version – 4:09
- Dance mix – 8:24
- Dub Mix – 7:00
- Tender Mix – 7:15

== Personnel ==
- Tina Turner – lead vocals
- Nick Glennie-Smith – keyboards
- Billy Livsey – keyboards
- Terry Britten – guitars, bass, backing vocals
- Jack Bruno – drums

== Charts ==
"Two People" became a top ten hit in Germany and Switzerland, and reached the top 20 in Austria, the Netherlands on Billboard's Hot R&B/Hip-Hop Songs chart. It was also a #30 pop hit on the Billboard Hot 100 chart in the United States.

=== Weekly charts ===
| Chart (1986–1987) | Peak position |
|---|---|
| Austria (Ö3 Austria Top 40) | 19 |
| Belgium (Ultratop 50 Flanders) | 28 |
| Canada Top Singles (RPM) | 53 |
| Canada Adult Contemporary (RPM) | 9 |
| Europe (European Hot 100 Singles) | 13 |
| Germany (Official German Charts) | 10 |
| Ireland (IRMA) | 23 |
| Netherlands (Dutch Top 40) | 22 |
| Netherlands (Single Top 100) | 20 |
| New Zealand (Recorded Music NZ) | 21 |
| Switzerland (Schweizer Hitparade) | 10 |
| UK Singles (Official Charts) | 43 |
| US Billboard Hot 100 | 30 |
| US Adult Contemporary (Billboard) | 12 |
| US Hot R&B/Hip-Hop Songs (Billboard) | 18 |
| US Cash Box Top 100 | 29 |

== Music video ==
There were two music videos to "Two People", including one with Turner dressed as different characters, such as Cinderella.
