= Typical Male =

Single by Tina Turner

from the album Break Every Rule
- B-side: "Don't Turn Around"
- Released: August 11, 1986
- Genre: Pop rock
- Length: 4:18
- Label: Capitol
- Songwriters: Terry Britten; Graham Lyle
- Producer: Terry Britten

Tina Turner singles chronology
"It's Only Love" (1985)	"Typical Male" (1986)	"Back Where You Started" (1986)

"Typical Male" is a song recorded by American singer Tina Turner. It was written by Terry Britten and Graham Lyle and produced by the former for Turner's studio album Break Every Rule (1986).

The song reached number one on the US Cash Box Top 100 and just missed becoming her second number-one hit on the US Billboard Hot 100 chart, peaking at number two for three consecutive weeks (behind "When I Think of You" by Janet Jackson and "True Colors" by Cyndi Lauper). It also reached number three on the Billboard Hot Black Singles chart. The B-side of the single is "Don't Turn Around", later covered by Bonnie Tyler, Aswad, and Ace of Base.

Phil Collins plays drums on the song.

== Music video ==
In the music video for "Typical Male", Turner is seen in a red minidress, flirting with a lawyer. She plays games with him, such as chess and Scrabble in order to get his attention. Throughout the video, Turner is seen hugging and leaning against a statue of the lawyer's leg. At one point in the video, she and the lawyer are sitting on a gigantic telephone headpiece, and she jumps up and down on one end of the phone sending the lawyer high into the air. At the end of the video, Turner and the lawyer are seen walking together holding hands.

== Personnel ==
- Tina Turner – lead vocals
- Nick Glennie-Smith – keyboards
- Terry Britten – guitars, bass, backing vocals
- Phil Collins – drums
- Tim Cappello – saxophone solo
- Tessa Niles – backing vocals

== Charts ==
=== Weekly charts ===
Chart (1986)	Peak position
Australia (Kent Music Report)	20
Austria (Ö3 Austria Top 40)	6
Belgium (Ultratop 50 Flanders)	17
Canada Top Singles (RPM)	11
Canada Adult Contemporary (RPM)	12
Europe (European Hot 100 Singles)	5
Finland (Suomen virallinen lista)	1
France (SNEP)	31
Ireland (IRMA)	12
Netherlands (Dutch Top 40)	8
Netherlands (Single Top 100)	14
New Zealand (Recorded Music NZ)	8
Norway (VG-lista)	2
South Africa (Springbok Charts)	22
Spain (AFYVE)	1
Sweden (Sverigetopplistan)	6
Switzerland (Schweizer Hitparade)	2
UK Singles (Official Charts)	33
US Billboard Hot 100	2
US Adult Contemporary (Billboard)	23
US Dance Club Songs (Billboard) Remix	11
US Dance Singles Sales (Billboard) Remix	20
US Hot R&B/Hip-Hop Songs (Billboard)	3
US Cash Box Top 100	1
West Germany (GfK)	3

=== Year-end charts ===
Chart (1986)	Position
Belgium (Ultratop)	96
Canada Top Singles (RPM)	91
Netherlands (Dutch Top 40)	69
Netherlands (Single Top 100)	48
Norway Summer Period (VG-lista)	8
Switzerland (Schweizer Hitparade)	18
US Billboard Hot 100	71
US Cash Box Top 100	33
West Germany (Media Control)	37
