= Queen of Rock 'n' Roll (album) =

Compilation album by Tina Turner
- Released: November 24, 2023
- Recorded: 1975–2023
- Length: 235:29
- Label: Parlophone

Tina Turner chronology
Love Songs (2014)	Queen of Rock 'n' Roll (2023)

Queen of Rock 'n' Roll is a posthumous compilation album by Swiss-American singer Tina Turner, released on November 24, 2023, through Parlophone. It contains Turner's 55 singles from 1975 to 2020 in chronological order, including a new version of Turner's 1996 song "Something Beautiful Remains" by Terry Britten titled "Something Beautiful". The full physical version contains 5 LPs and 3 CDs, a 12-track vinyl edition is also available. The physical versions contain a foreword by Turner's collaborator and friend Bryan Adams. It was Turner's first music project released following her death on May 24, 2023.

== Reception ==
Professional ratings
Review scores
Source	Rating
AllMusic	4.5/5 stars
Criptic Rock	5/5 stars
Retropop Magazine	4/5 stars

Criptic Rock said "Squashing the antiquated idea that rock n roll is a man's genre of music, Tina Turner is a pioneering lady who demands your attention. Singing with such passion and conviction; anytime you hear a song of hers, it is immediately distinguishable... there is simply no one quite like Tina Turner. That is why it is justified that she was named 'queen of rock 'n' roll in life and thereafter." They said the "anthology set is a perfect way to celebrate the life and music of Tina Turner."

Retropop Magazine called the release a "thundering anthology of her enduring legacy."

== Track listing ==
Disc one
No.	Title	Original album	Length
1.	"Whole Lotta Love" (single edit)	Acid Queen	4:45
2.	"Acid Queen"	Acid Queen	3:50
3.	"Root, Toot Undisputable Rock 'n' Roller"	Rough	4:31
4.	"Viva La Money"	Rough	3:17
5.	"Sometimes When We Touch"	Rough	3:59
6.	"Music Keeps Me Dancin'"	Love Explosion	3:56
7.	"Let's Stay Together" (single edit)	Private Dancer	3:41
8.	"Help!" (single edit)	Private Dancer	4:32
9.	"What's Love Got to Do with It"	Private Dancer	3:52
10.	"Better Be Good to Me" (single edit)	Private Dancer	3:42
11.	"Private Dancer" (single edit)	Private Dancer	4:02
12.	"I Can't Stand the Rain"	Private Dancer	3:45
13.	"Show Some Respect"	Private Dancer	3:21
14.	"We Don't Need Another Hero (Thunderdome)" (single edit)	Mad Max Beyond Thunderdome	4:16
15.	"One of the Living" (single edit)	Mad Max Beyond Thunderdome	4:13
16.	"It's Only Love" (with Bryan Adams)	Reckless (Bryan Adams album)	3:17
17.	"Typical Male"	Break Every Rule	4:19
18.	"Two People"	Break Every Rule	4:13
19.	"What You Get Is What You See" (single edit)	Break Every Rule	3:57
20.	"Girls"	Break Every Rule	5:00
Total length:			82:01

Disc two
No.	Title	Original album	Length
1.	"Break Every Rule" (single mix)	Break Every Rule	4:03
2.	"Paradise Is Here" (radio edit)	Break Every Rule	5:37
3.	"Afterglow" (7" mix)	Break Every Rule	4:16
4.	"Tearing Us Apart" (with Eric Clapton)	August (Eric Clapton album)	4:19
5.	"Addicted to Love" (live at Camden Palace, London)	Tina Live in Europe	5:06
6.	"A Change Is Gonna Come" (live in Europe)	Tina Live in Europe	6:46
7.	"Tonight" (with David Bowie; live at NEC, Birmingham)	Tina Live in Europe	4:06
8.	"River Deep, Mountain High" (live in Europe)	Tina Live in Europe	4:13
9.	"The Best" (single edit)	Foreign Affair	4:15
10.	"Steamy Windows"	Foreign Affair	4:05
11.	"I Don't Wanna Lose You"	Foreign Affair	4:22
12.	"Look Me in the Heart"	Foreign Affair	3:44
13.	"Foreign Affair" (single edit)	Foreign Affair	3:46
14.	"Be Tender with Me Baby"	Foreign Affair	4:24
15.	"It Takes Two" (with Rod Stewart)	Vagabond Heart (Rod Stewart album)	4:15
16.	"Nutbush City Limits (The 90s Version)"	Simply the Best	3:46
17.	"Love Thing"	Simply the Best	4:30
18.	"Way of the World"	Simply the Best	4:27
Total length:			80:00

Disc three
No.	Title	Original album	Length
1.	"I Want You Near Me"	Simply the Best	3:55
2.	"I Don't Wanna Fight" (single edit)	What's Love Got to Do with It	4:27
3.	"Disco Inferno"	What's Love Got to Do with It	4:06
4.	"Why Must We Wait Until Tonight" (7" single mix)	What's Love Got to Do with It	4:29
5.	"Proud Mary" (single edit)	What's Love Got to Do with It	4:10
6.	"GoldenEye"	Wildest Dream	4:45
7.	"Whatever You Want" (alternative mix)	Wildest Dreams	4:40
8.	"On Silent Wings" (single edit)	Wildest Dreams	4:21
9.	"Missing You" (single edit)	Wildest Dreams	4:04
10.	"In Your Wildest Dreams" (with Barry White; radio edit)	Wildest Dreams	3:49
11.	"Cose della vita" (with Eros Ramazzotti)	Eros (Eros Ramazzotti album)	4:50
12.	"When the Heartache Is Over"	Twenty Four Seven	3:45
13.	"Whatever You Need"	Twenty Four Seven	4:48
14.	"Open Arms"	All the Best	4:00
15.	"Teach Me Again" (with Elisa)	All the Invisible Children	4:35
16.	"What's Love Got to Do with It" (Kygo remix)	non-album single	3:28
17.	"Something Beautiful" (2023 version)	new recording	5:16
Total length:			73:28

Note

- 24 of the 55 tracks are marked as remasters, ranging from 1994 to 2023.

== Charts ==
Chart performance for Queen of Rock 'n' Roll
Chart (2023)	Peak position
Austrian Albums (Ö3 Austria)	14
Belgian Albums (Ultratop Flanders)	14
Belgian Albums (Ultratop Wallonia)	31
Croatian International Albums (HDU)	5
Dutch Albums (Album Top 100)	82
French Albums (SNEP)	62
German Albums (Offizielle Top 100)	15
Polish Albums (ZPAV)	96
Portuguese Albums (AFP)	11
Scottish Albums (Official Charts)	5
Spanish Albums (Promusicae)	36
Swiss Albums (Schweizer Hitparade)	7
UK Albums (Official Charts)	16

== Certifications ==
Region	Certification	Certified units/sales
New Zealand (RMNZ)	Gold	7,500^{‡}
United Kingdom (BPI)	Gold	100,000^{‡}
^{‡} Sales+streaming figures based on certification alone.
