= Love Songs (Tina Turner album) =

Compilation album by Tina Turner
- Released: February 3, 2014
- Recorded: 1965–1999
- Length: 74:00
- Label: Parlophone

Tina Turner chronology
Tina Live (2009)	Love Songs (2014)	Queen of Rock 'n' Roll (2023)

Love Songs is a compilation album by American singer Tina Turner, released on February 3, 2014, by Parlophone. The album is a collection of eighteen of Turner's greatest love songs, and spans more than three decades.

== Track listing ==
Love Songs track listing
No.	Title	Writer(s)	Length
1.	"The Best" (Edit)	Mike Chapman, Holly Knight	4:10
2.	"I Don't Wanna Lose You"	Albert Hammond, Graham Lyle	4:13
3.	"Let's Stay Together" (Single Version)	Al Green, Willie Mitchell, Al Jackson Jr.	3:39
4.	"What's Love Got to Do with It"	Terry Britten, Graham Lyle	3:46
5.	"Missing You" (Single Edit)	John Waite, Mark Leonard, Chas Sandford	4:02
6.	"Private Dancer" (Single Edit)	Mark Knopfler	4:00
7.	"Two People"	Terry Britten	4:09
8.	"Look Me in the Heart"	Billy Steinberg, Tom Kelly	3:41
9.	"Way of the World"	Albert Hammond, Graham Lyle	4:25
10.	"Why Must We Wait Until Tonight" (7" Edit)	Bryan Adams, Robert John "Mutt" Lange	4:29
11.	"Falling"	Tim Fraser, Sol Connell	4:21
12.	"I Want You Near Me"	Terry Britten, Graham Lyle	3:53
13.	"Be Tender with Me Baby"	Albert Hammond, Holly Knight	4:17
14.	"Don't Leave Me This Way"	Paul Barry, Mark Taylor, Brian Rawling	4:19
15.	"I Don't Wanna Fight" (Single Edit)	Lulu, Billy Lawrie, Steve DuBerry	4:25
16.	"Whatever You Need" (Edit)	Harriet Roberts, Russell Courtenay	4:48
17.	"When the Heartache Is Over"	Graham Stack, John Reid	3:44
18.	"River Deep – Mountain High" (Ike & Tina Turner)	Phil Spector, Jeff Barry, Ellie Greenwich	3:39

== Charts ==
=== Weekly charts ===
Weekly chart performance for Love Songs
Chart (2014)	Peak position
Belgian Albums (Ultratop Flanders)	107
Belgian Albums (Ultratop Wallonia)	134
Czech Albums (ČNS IFPI)	30
German Albums (Offizielle Top 100)	56
Hungarian Albums (MAHASZ)	3
Irish Albums (IRMA)	11
Polish Albums (ZPAV)	24
Portuguese Albums (AFP)	14
Scottish Albums (OCC)	22
Spanish Albums (PROMUSICAE)	88
Swiss Albums (Schweizer Hitparade)	30
UK Albums (OCC)	30

=== Year-end charts ===
Year-end chart performance for Love Songs
Chart (2014)	Position
Hungarian Albums (MAHASZ)	59
