= All the Best (Tina Turner album) =

Greatest hits album by Tina Turner
- Released: November 1, 2004
- Genre: Pop rock; rock; soul; R&B
- Label: Parlophone

Tina Turner chronology
Twenty Four Seven (1999)	All the Best (2004)	Tina! (2008)

Alternative cover
- US single-disc version cover

Singles from All the Best
- 1. "Open Arms" Released: September 2004

Professional ratings
Review scores
Source	Rating
AllMusic	4/5 stars
Rolling Stone	3/5 stars

All the Best is a greatest hits album by American singer Tina Turner, released on November 1, 2004, by Parlophone. In the United States, it was released on February 1, 2005, by Capitol Records, followed by an abridged single-disc version titled All the Best: The Hits on October 4, 2005.

== Overview ==
The track listing concentrates on Turner's solo singles, but also features a few highlights from her partnership with Ike Turner. It also contains three new recordings ("Open Arms", "Complicated Disaster" and "Something Special") and some rarer tracks, including duets and her song from the Brother Bear soundtrack, "Great Spirits".

The album peaked at number six on the UK Albums Chart, selling nearly 45,000 copies in its first week, and at number two on the Billboard 200, selling 121,000 copies in its first week, becoming Turner's highest debut in the United States. The album was certified platinum in the U.S. three months after its release. In March 2007, the album re-entered the UK chart at number 18. It has since been certified platinum in various countries.

== Track listing ==
=== All the Best ===
Disc one
No.	Title	Writer(s)	Original album	Length
1.	"Open Arms"	Barson, Brammer, VanSertima	Previously unreleased	4:01
2.	"Nutbush City Limits" (Ike & Tina Turner)	Turner	Nutbush City Limits (1973)	2:57
3.	"What You Get Is What You See"	Britten, Lyle	Break Every Rule (1986)	4:26
4.	"Missing You"	Leonard, Sanford, Waite	Wildest Dreams (1996)	4:39
5.	"The Best"	Chapman, Knight	Foreign Affair (1989)	5:29
6.	"River Deep – Mountain High" (Ike & Tina Turner)	Barry, Greenwich, Spector	River Deep – Mountain High (1966)	3:41
7.	"When the Heartache Is Over"	Reid, Stack	Twenty Four Seven (1999)	3:44
8.	"Let's Stay Together"	Green, Jackson, Mitchell	Private Dancer (1984)	5:17
9.	"I Don't Wanna Fight" (7″ edit)	Duberry, Lulu, Lawrie	What's Love Got to Do with It (1993)	4:26
10.	"Whatever You Need"	Courtenay, Roberts	Twenty Four Seven	4:49
11.	"I Can't Stand the Rain"	Bryant, Miller, Peebles	Private Dancer	3:43
12.	"GoldenEye" (Soundtrack version)	Evans, Hewson	Wildest Dreams and GoldenEye (1995)	4:43
13.	"I Don't Wanna Lose You"	Hammond, Lyle	Foreign Affair	4:20
14.	"Great Spirits"	Collins	Brother Bear (2003)	3:58
15.	"Proud Mary" (1993 version)	Fogerty	What's Love Got to Do with It	5:26
16.	"Addicted to Love" (Live)	Robert Palmer	Tina Live in Europe (1988)	5:22

Disc two
No.	Title	Writer(s)	Original album	Length
1.	"In Your Wildest Dreams" (featuring Antonio Banderas)	Chapman, Knight	Wildest Dreams	5:34
2.	"Private Dancer" (7″ edit)	Knopfler	Private Dancer	4:03
3.	"Why Must We Wait Until Tonight" (7″ edit)	Adams, Lange	What's Love Got to Do with It	4:30
4.	"Typical Male"	Britten, Lyle	Break Every Rule	4:17
5.	"Tonight" (with David Bowie)	Bowie, Pop	Tonight (1984)	3:45
6.	"Complicated Disaster"	Escoffery, Robson	Previously unreleased	3:43
7.	"On Silent Wings" (featuring Sting) (Single edit)	Ralston, White	Wildest Dreams	4:20
8.	"Something Special"	Hammond, Lyle	Previously unreleased	4:37
9.	"We Don't Need Another Hero (Thunderdome)" (7″ edit)	Britten, Lyle	Mad Max Beyond Thunderdome (1985)	4:16
10.	"It's Only Love" (with Bryan Adams)	Adams, Vallance	Reckless (1985)	3:16
11.	"Cose Della Vita (Can't Stop Thinking of You)" (with Eros Ramazzotti)	Ramazzotti, Cassano, Cogliati, Turner, Ralston	Eros (1997)	4:50
12.	"Steamy Windows"	White	Foreign Affair	4:05
13.	"Paradise Is Here" (7″ edit)	Brady	Break Every Rule	5:00
14.	"What's Love Got to Do With It"	Britten, Lyle	Private Dancer	3:48
15.	"Better Be Good to Me"	Chapman, Chinn, Knight	Private Dancer	5:10
16.	"Two People"	Britten, Lyle	Break Every Rule	4:09
17.	"Something Beautiful Remains"	Britten, Lyle	Wildest Dreams	4:22

=== All the Best: The Hits ===
No.	Title	Writer(s)	Length
1.	"I Don't Wanna Fight" (7″ edit)	Duberry, Lulu, Lawrie	4:26
2.	"What's Love Got to Do With It"	Britten, Lyle	3:48
3.	"Proud Mary" (1993 version)	Fogerty	5:26
4.	"Open Arms"	Barson, Brammer, VanSertima	4:01
5.	"Private Dancer" (7″ edit)	Knopfler	4:02
6.	"The Best"	Chapman, Knight	5:29
7.	"Better Be Good to Me"	Chapman, Chinn, Knight	5:10
8.	"Let's Stay Together"	Green, Jackson, Mitchell	5:17
9.	"Nutbush City Limits" (Ike & Tina Turner)	Turner	2:57
10.	"Missing You"	Leonard, Sanford, Waite	4:39
11.	"Complicated Disaster"	Escoffery, Robson	3:42
12.	"It's Only Love" (with Bryan Adams)	Adams, Vallance	3:16
13.	"Look Me in the Heart"	Kelly, Steinberg	3:44
14.	"On Silent Wings" (featuring Sting) (single edit)	White	4:20
15.	"Two People"	Britten, Lyle	4:09
16.	"Typical Male"	Britten, Lyle	4:16
17.	"We Don't Need Another Hero (Thunderdome)" (7″ edit)	Britten, Lyle	4:17
18.	"What You Get Is What You See"	Britten, Lyle	4:26

== Charts ==
=== Weekly charts ===
2004–2005 weekly chart performance for All the Best
Chart (2004–2005)	Peak position
Australian Albums (ARIA)	64
Austrian Albums (Ö3 Austria)	3
Belgian Albums (Ultratop Flanders)	5
Belgian Albums (Ultratop Wallonia)	20
Canadian Albums (Billboard)	4
Czech Albums (ČNS IFPI)	32
Danish Albums (Hitlisten)	6
Dutch Albums (Album Top 100)	7
European Albums (Billboard)	2
Finnish Albums (Suomen virallinen lista)	15
French Compilation Albums (SNEP)	8
German Albums (Offizielle Top 100)	5
Greek International Albums (IFPI)	15
Hungarian Albums (MAHASZ)	7
Irish Albums (IRMA)	17
Italian Albums (FIMI)	8
New Zealand Albums (RMNZ)	13
Norwegian Albums (VG-lista)	8
Polish Albums (ZPAV)	9
Portuguese Albums (AFP)	2
Scottish Albums (OCC)	6
Spanish Albums (PROMUSICAE)	11
Swedish Albums (Sverigetopplistan)	14
Swiss Albums (Schweizer Hitparade)	3
UK Albums (OCC)	6
US Billboard 200	2
US Top R&B/Hip-Hop Albums (Billboard)	12

2023 weekly chart performance for All the Best
Chart (2023)	Peak position
Australian Albums (ARIA)	17
Polish Albums (ZPAV)	2
UK Albums Sales (OCC)	64

2023 weekly chart performance for All the Best: The Hits
Chart (2023)	Peak position
Canadian Albums (Billboard)	20
Irish Albums (IRMA)	56
New Zealand Albums (RMNZ)	3
US Billboard 200	45
US Top R&B/Hip-Hop Albums (Billboard)	14

=== Year-end charts ===
2004 year-end chart performance for All the Best
Chart (2004)	Position
Austrian Albums (Ö3 Austria)	57
Belgian Albums (Ultratop Flanders)	42
Belgian Albums (Ultratop Wallonia)	92
Danish Albums (Hitlisten)	31
Finnish International Albums (Suomen virallinen lista)	25
German Albums (Offizielle Top 100)	97
Hungarian Albums (MAHASZ)	97
Swiss Albums (Schweizer Hitparade)	39
UK Albums (OCC)	54

2005 year-end chart performance for All the Best
Chart (2005)	Position
Austrian Albums (Ö3 Austria)	63
Dutch Albums (Album Top 100)	81
European Albums (Billboard)	62
German Albums (Offizielle Top 100)	68
Hungarian Albums (MAHASZ)	65
Swiss Albums (Schweizer Hitparade)	43
US Billboard 200	133

2023 year-end chart performance for All the Best
Chart (2023)	Position
Polish Albums (ZPAV)	85

== Certifications and sales ==
Certifications and sales for All the Best
Region	Certification	Certified units/sales
Austria (IFPI Austria)	Platinum	30,000^{*}
Belgium (BRMA)	Platinum	50,000^{*}
Canada (Music Canada)	Platinum	100,000^{^}
Denmark (IFPI Danmark)	Gold	20,000^{^}
Finland	—	10,779
France (SNEP)	Gold	100,000^{*}
Germany (BVMI)	3× Gold	300,000^{^}
Hungary (MAHASZ)	Gold	10,000^{^}
Ireland (IRMA)	Platinum	15,000^{^}
Netherlands (NVPI)	Gold	40,000^{^}
New Zealand (RMNZ)	Gold	7,500^{^}
Poland (ZPAV)	Gold	20,000^{*}
Portugal (AFP)	Platinum	40,000^{^}
Spain (PROMUSICAE)	Platinum	100,000^{^}
Switzerland (IFPI Switzerland)	Platinum	40,000^{^}
United Kingdom (BPI)	Platinum	300,000^{^}
United States (RIAA)	Platinum	616,000
Summaries
Europe (IFPI)	Platinum	1,000,000^{*}
^{*} Sales figures based on certification alone.^{^} Shipments figures based on certification alone.
