= Twenty Four Seven Tour =

2000 concert tour by Tina Turner

- Tour by Tina Turner
- Promotional poster for the tour
- Location: Europe; North America
- Associated album: Twenty Four Seven
- Start date: March 23, 2000
- End date: December 6, 2000
- Legs: 3
- No. of shows: 121
- Supporting acts: Janice Robinson, Lionel Richie, Joe Cocker, John Fogerty
- Attendance: 2.4 million (from 108 reported shows)
- Box office: $122.5 million ($223.67 million in 2024 dollars) [from 108 reported shows]

Tina Turner concert chronology
- Wildest Dreams World Tour (1996–1997); Twenty Four Seven Tour (2000); Tina!: 50th Anniversary Tour (2008–2009)

The Twenty Four Seven Tour (also known as the Twenty Four Seven Millennium Tour and 24/7 World Tour) was the tenth concert tour by singer Tina Turner. The tour promoted her final studio album Twenty Four Seven (1999). It was reported that the tour grossed US$122.5 million from 108 shows with an attendance of 2.4 million spectators. According to Pollstar, the tour also became that year's highest-grossing tour in North America with $80.2 million in earnings. At that time, Turner's outing was the fifth highest grossing tour ever in North America. The tour was sponsored by E*Trade.

Though billed as her final outing, Turner would return to touring in 2008 with her anniversary tour.

== Background ==
After her record-breaking 1996 world tour, Turner decided to take a longer break between albums and tours. Initially, Turner planned an elaborate co-headlining tour with Elton John. The two performed a duet of Turner's hit "Proud Mary" and John's "The Bitch is Back" on the VH1 special, "Divas Live '99". During rehearsals, Turner felt unease with the music and stopped everyone from playing and then instructed John on how to play the song.

"I made a mistake when I needed to show him how to play 'Proud Mary'. The mistake is you don't show Elton John how to play his piano. He just went into a rage, which he apologized for later. He said it was wrong."

— Tina Turner, CBS News

The tour plans were cancelled and Turner scrapped her initial plans for a greatest hits collection deciding to record her final studio album. Along the way, Turner also performed the Super Bowl XXXIV pre-show ceremonies.

To introduce the tour, Turner stated:

It's a play. It's an act. For the moment, it's a small movie, so to speak. That's why I like all of the stuff and the action and the playoff between me and the girls. It's life on that stage for that two hours.

== Development ==
As mentioned above, the tour initially was set to promote her latest studio album. During promotion, Turner acknowledge the tour as her final one as she enters pseudo-retirement. She comments:

I've been performing for 44 years; I really should hang up my dancing shoes. I can't keep up with Janet Jackson. I'm not a diva like Diana Ross. I'm rock 'n' roll, but I'm happy I can do it one more time, so people can remember me at my best."

The album played a prominent role in the tour as Turner rehearsed "Whatever You Need", "When the Heartache is Over", "Talk to My Heart", "Falling", "Don't Leave Me This Way" (which was to be included in a ballads medley with "Two People" and two other unknown songs) and "Twenty Four Seven". When Turner decided to do a retrospective of her career, she included her first hit, "A Fool in Love", the first time Turner performed the song live since the 1970s. Turner also rehearsed "Ooh Poo Pah Do" but replaced with "Get Back". Additionally, she included some of her favorite R&B hits including, "Hold On, I'm A Comin'" and "I Heard It Through the Grapevine".

Tina had previously planned to have more acoustic styled arrangements for the set list, however as the tour developed this idea was scrapped

"It has been described as a stadium tour in an arena. [it's] hugely complicated and one of the largest arena shows to ever go out and tour back-to-back."

— Mark Fisher

For her final outing, Turner wanted a stage that was sleek and modern. Her original concepts included the framing of an "apartment building" that had cabins and access ramps. Also included were risers with visible staircases and front drop for the musicians. Fisher, also wanted to create a volcano effect with the staging, have it split into two sets. This inner stage included a video screen and a ramp leading to an upstage platform. There was an additional ramp that lead downstage. The main feature of the stage was the "cantilever arm". A 2' wide, 60' long platform that extended Turner into the audience. Initially, Turner did not want the arm as the same concept was used for her 1990 European tour and she did not want to repeat herself. However, after seeing video animations, Turner wanted the arm included. For stadium shows, a roof for the stage was added along with additional video screens. The arm was extended an additional 20 feet. It took at least seven hours to construct the stage.

The stage was constructed by McLaren Engineering Group.

== Opening acts ==
- Lionel Richie (North America [Leg 1] & UK)
- John Fogerty (Europe [select dates]).
- Janice Robinson (North America [Leg 1])
- Joe Cocker (Europe [select dates] & North America [Leg 2])

== Set list ==
The following set list is from the July 16 show in London. It is not intended to represent all other dates throughout the tour.

1. "I Want to Take You Higher"
2. "Absolutely Nothing's Changed"
3. "A Fool in Love"
4. "Acid Queen"
5. "River Deep – Mountain High"
6. "We Don't Need Another Hero (Thunderdome)"
7. "Better Be Good to Me"
8. "Private Dancer"
9. "Let's Stay Together"
10. "What's Love Got to Do with It"
11. "When the Heartache Is Over"
12. "Baby I'm a Star" (Interlude)
13. "Help!"
14. "Whatever You Need"
15. "(Sittin' On) The Dock of the Bay" / "Try a Little Tenderness" (with John Miles)
16. "I Heard It Through the Grapevine"
17. "Addicted to Love"
18. "The Best"
19. "Proud Mary"
  Encore
20. "Nutbush City Limits"
21. "Twenty Four Seven"

Notes

- "Hold On, I'm A Comin'" was performed during the first leg in North America.
- "Get Back" was performed from March 23 to June 17, until it was ultimately replaced by "Better Be Good to Me".
- "I Heard It Through the Grapevine" was performed earlier in the set list, from March 23 to June 17, but was moved later in the set for shows in Europe. It permanently cut from the set list of the second North American leg.
- "Twenty Four Seven" was only performed during the European leg.
- "(Sittin' On) The Dock of the Bay" was added to the set list on June 30.
- Starting on September 20, a performance of "Hot Legs" by Turner's background singers replaced the "Baby I'm a Star" interlude. Additionally, "Steamy Windows" was added to the set list.

== Tour dates ==
Date	City	Country	Venue
North America—Leg 1
March 23, 2000	Minneapolis	United States	Target Center
March 24, 2000	Madison	United States	Kohl Center
March 25, 2000	Rosemont	United States	Allstate Arena
March 26, 2000	Auburn Hills	United States	The Palace of Auburn Hills
March 30, 2000	Cleveland	United States	Gund Arena
March 31, 2000	Louisville	United States	Freedom Hall
April 1, 2000	Greensboro	United States	Greensboro Coliseum
April 3, 2000	Philadelphia	United States	First Union Center
April 7, 2000	New York City	United States	Madison Square Garden
April 8, 2000	New York City	United States	Madison Square Garden
April 9, 2000	Buffalo	United States	HSBC Arena
April 12, 2000	Atlanta	United States	Philips Arena
April 14, 2000	Tampa	United States	Ice Palace
April 15, 2000	Sunrise	United States	National Car Rental Center
April 16, 2000	Sunrise	United States	National Car Rental Center
April 19, 2000	New Orleans	United States	New Orleans Arena
April 20, 2000	Dallas	United States	Reunion Arena
April 21, 2000	San Antonio	United States	Alamodome
April 23, 2000	Houston	United States	Compaq Center
April 27, 2000	Phoenix	United States	America West Arena
April 28, 2000	San Diego	United States	San Diego Sports Arena
April 29, 2000	Las Vegas	United States	MGM Grand Garden Arena
May 3, 2000	Sacramento	United States	ARCO Arena
May 4, 2000	Anaheim	United States	Arrowhead Pond of Anaheim
May 5, 2000	Anaheim	United States	Arrowhead Pond of Anaheim
May 6, 2000	San Jose	United States	San Jose Arena
May 8, 2000	Oakland	United States	The Arena in Oakland
May 12, 2000	Tacoma	United States	Tacoma Dome
May 13, 2000	Vancouver	Canada	General Motors Place
May 15, 2000	Salt Lake City	United States	Delta Center
May 17, 2000	Denver	United States	Pepsi Center
May 19, 2000	Kansas City	United States	Kemper Arena
May 20, 2000	Moline	United States	MARK of the Quad Cities
May 21, 2000	St. Louis	United States	Kiel Center
May 24, 2000	Milwaukee	United States	Bradley Center
May 26, 2000	Indianapolis	United States	Conseco Fieldhouse
May 27, 2000	Rosemont	United States	Allstate Arena
May 28, 2000	Cincinnati	United States	Firstar Center
June 1, 2000	Auburn Hills	United States	The Palace of Auburn Hills
June 2, 2000	Grand Rapids	United States	Van Andel Arena
June 3, 2000	Columbus	United States	Jerome Schottenstein Center
June 4, 2000	Toronto	Canada	Air Canada Centre
June 8, 2000	Boston	United States	FleetCenter
June 9, 2000	Boston	United States	FleetCenter
June 10, 2000	Montreal	Canada	Molson Centre
June 11, 2000	Ottawa	Canada	Corel Centre
June 14, 2000	Bristow	United States	Nissan Pavilion at Stone Ridge
June 15, 2000	Hartford	United States	Hartford Civic Center
June 17, 2000	East Rutherford	United States	Continental Airlines Arena
Europe
June 30, 2000	Zürich	Switzerland	Letzigrund Stadion
July 1, 2000	Zürich	Switzerland	Letzigrund Stadion
July 3, 2000	Hanover	Germany	Niedersachsenstadion
July 5, 2000	Saint-Denis	France	Stade de France
July 7, 2000	Glasgow	Scotland	Hampden Park
July 9, 2000	Cardiff	Wales	Millennium Stadium
July 11, 2000	Dublin	Ireland	RDS Arena
July 13, 2000	Sheffield	England	Don Valley Stadium
July 15, 2000	London	England	Wembley Stadium
July 16, 2000	London	England	Wembley Stadium
July 18, 2000	Groningen	Netherlands	Stadspark
July 19, 2000	Hamburg	Germany	Volksparkstadion
July 21, 2000	Berlin	Germany	Olympic Stadium
July 23, 2000	Munich	Germany	Olympic Stadium
July 25, 2000	Werchter	Belgium	Werchter festival ground
July 27, 2000	Frankfurt	Germany	Waldstadion
July 28, 2000	Cologne	Germany	Müngersdorfer Stadion
July 30, 2000	Leipzig	Germany	Zentralstadion
August 1, 2000	Vienna	Austria	Ernst Happel Stadion
August 3, 2000	Copenhagen	Denmark	Parken Stadium
August 5, 2000	Gothenburg	Sweden	Ullevi
August 6, 2000	Oslo	Norway	Valle Hovin
August 9, 2000	Helsinki	Finland	Finnair Stadium
August 10, 2000	Helsinki	Finland	Finnair Stadium
August 12, 2000	Tallinn	Estonia	Tallinn Song Festival Grounds
August 15, 2000	Sopot	Poland	Hipodrom Sopot
North America—Leg 2
September 20, 2000	Boston	United States	FleetCenter
September 22, 2000	Philadelphia	United States	First Union Center
September 23, 2000	Albany	United States	Pepsi Arena
September 24, 2000	Toronto	Canada	Air Canada Centre
September 26, 2000	Toronto	Canada	Air Canada Centre
September 28, 2000	Montreal	Canada	Molson Centre
September 30, 2000	Pittsburgh	United States	Mellon Arena
October 1, 2000	Uniondale	United States	Nassau Veterans Memorial Coliseum
October 4, 2000	Chicago	United States	United Center
October 6, 2000	Cleveland	United States	Quicken Loans Arena
October 7, 2000	Washington, D.C.	United States	MCI Center
October 8, 2000	Raleigh	United States	Raleigh Entertainment & Sports Arena
October 11, 2000 (Note: Originally scheduled for October 13, 2000.)	Greenville	United States	BI-LO Center
October 13, 2000 (Note: Originally scheduled for October 12, 2000.)	Charlotte	United States	Charlotte Coliseum
October 14, 2000	Atlanta	United States	Philips Arena
October 15, 2000	Orlando	United States	TD Waterhouse Centre
October 18, 2000	Sunrise	United States	National Car Rental Center
October 20, 2000	Nashville	United States	Gaylord Entertainment Center
October 21, 2000	Birmingham	United States	BJCC Arena
October 22, 2000	Knoxville	United States	Thompson–Boling Arena
October 25, 2000	New Orleans	United States	New Orleans Arena
October 27, 2000	Austin	United States	Frank Erwin Center
October 28, 2000	Dallas	United States	Reunion Arena
October 29, 2000	Houston	United States	Compaq Center
November 1, 2000	Columbus	United States	Nationwide Arena
November 3, 2000	Lexington	United States	Rupp Arena
November 4, 2000	Dayton	United States	Nutter Center
November 5, 2000	Detroit	United States	Joe Louis Arena
November 9, 2000	Fargo	United States	Fargodome
November 10, 2000	Ames	United States	Hilton Coliseum
November 11, 2000	Minneapolis	United States	Target Center
November 14, 2000	Denver	United States	Pepsi Center
November 16, 2000	San Jose	United States	San Jose Arena
November 17, 2000	Los Angeles	United States	Staples Center
November 18, 2000	Las Vegas	United States	MGM Grand Garden Arena
November 19, 2000	Las Vegas	United States	MGM Grand Garden Arena
November 22, 2000	Portland	United States	Rose Garden
November 24, 2000	Edmonton	Canada	Skyreach Centre
November 25, 2000	Calgary	Canada	Pengrowth Saddledome
November 27, 2000	Vancouver	Canada	General Motors Place
November 29, 2000	Seattle	United States	KeyArena
December 1, 2000	Oakland	United States	The Arena in Oakland
December 2, 2000 (Note: Originally scheduled for December 8, 2000.)	Reno	United States	Lawlor Events Center
December 3, 2000 (Note: Originally scheduled for December 1, 2000.)	Bakersfield	United States	Centennial Garden Arena
December 5, 2000 (Note: Originally scheduled for December 6, 2000.)	Phoenix	United States	America West Arena
December 6, 2000 (Note: Originally scheduled for December 3, 2000.)	Anaheim	United States	Arrowhead Pond of Anaheim

== Cancelled shows ==
Date	City	Country	Venue	Reason
September 29, 2000	University Park	United States	Bryce Jordan Center	Scheduling conflict
December 2, 2000	San Diego	United States	San Diego Sports Arena	Scheduling conflict
December 9, 2000	Nampa	United States	Idaho Center	Scheduling conflict
December 16, 2000	Honolulu	United States	Aloha Stadium	Scheduling conflict

== Box office score data ==
Venue	City	Tickets sold / available	Gross revenue
Allstate Arena	Rosemont	25,469 / 25,469 (100%)	$1,778,830
The Palace of Auburn Hills	Auburn Hills	29,922 / 29,922 (100%)	$1,820,889
Greensboro Coliseum	Greensboro	14,049 / 14,049 (100%)	$908,709
Madison Square Garden	New York City	29,117 / 29,962 (97%)	$2,489,681
HSBC Arena	Buffalo	11,964 / 11,964 (100%)	$751,016
Ice Palace	Tampa	14,254 / 15,109 (94%)	$751,016
New Orleans Arena	New Orleans	13,211 / 14,080 (94%)	$931,935
Reunion Arena	Dallas	26,592 / 27,750 (96%)	$1,701,133
Alamodome	San Antonio	20,116 / 21,196 (95%)	$1,142,610
America West Arena	Phoenix	23,650 / 24,908 (95%)	$1,716,431
San Diego Sports Arena	San Diego	10,219 / 11,664 (88%)	$582,900
Arrowhead Pond of Anaheim	Anaheim	37,344 / 37,344 (100%)	$2,303,155
Van Andel Arena	Grand Rapids	11,791 / 12,420 (95%)	$621,589
Tacoma Dome	Tacoma	19,582 / 20,202 (97%)	$1,191,311
General Motors Place	Vancouver	14,297 / 14,297 (100%)	$768,540
Kemper Arena	Kansas City	14,698 / 15,048 (98%)	$847,994
MARK of the Quad Cities	Moline	10,551 / 10,551 (100%)	$679,595
Kiel Center	St. Louis	15,147 / 20,226 (75%)	$907,284
Bradley Center	Milwaukee	14,023 / 17,784 (79%)	$853,893
Conseco Fieldhouse	Indianapolis	12,871 / 13,460 (96%)	$803,000
FleetCenter	Boston	27,926 / 27,926 (100%)	$1,926,240
Nissan Pavilion at Stone Ridge	Bristow	20,032 / 22,549 (89%)	$963,282
Continental Airlines Arena	East Rutherford	27,584 / 34,398 (80%)	$1,745,015
Olympic Stadium	Berlin	48,977 / 48,977 (100%)	$1,858,172
Olympic Stadium	Munich	73,920 / 73,920 (100%)	$2,776,840
Werchter Festival Grounds	Werchter	72,820 / 72,820 (100%)	$2,522,633
Waldstadion	Frankfurt	51,460 / 51,460 (100%)	$1,926,238
Müngersdorfer Stadion	Cologne	60,288 / 60,288 (100%)	$2,106,688
Parken Stadium	Copenhagen	45,843 / 45,843 (100%)	$2,357,824
Valle Hovin	Oslo	30,604 / 30,604 (100%)	$1,362,448
Ullevi	Gothenburg	55,180 / 55,180 (100%)	$2,415,729
Helsinki Olympic Stadium	Helsinki	42,021 / 42,021 (100%)	$1,936,731
First Union Center	Philadelphia	11,514 / 15,000 (77%)	$865,609
Pepsi Arena	Albany	12,318 / 12,318 (100%)	$857,812
Air Canada Centre	Toronto	29,900 / 29,900 (100%)	$1,587,361
Molson Centre	Montreal	14,312 / 14,312 (100%)	$784,551
BI-LO Center	Greenville	10,951 / 10,951 (100%)	$722,857
Charlotte Coliseum	Charlotte	12,107 / 16,966 (71%)	$854,927
Frank Erwin Center	Austin	12,519 / 12,519 (100%)	$805,051
Nutter Center	Dayton	11,027 / 11,027 (100%)	$686,459
Target Center	Minneapolis	13,298 / 13,298 (100%)	$843,327
Staples Center	Los Angeles	13,652 / 13,652 (100%)	$1,077,634
Centennial Garden Arena	Bakersfield	8,584 / 8,584 (100%)	$594,792
TOTAL		1,075,704 / 1,111,898 (97%)	$57,209,202

== Critical reception ==
Josh L. Dickey (Spartanburg Herald Journal) praised the tour, stating, "'In fact, the only low points came during Turner's protracted absences for outfit changes, when the backing crew was forced to carry the show. Minus Turner's soaring vocals—which cut sharply though the Target Center's infamously muddy acoustic chamber—the band seemed awkward and cursory.

Mark Brown (Rocky Mountain News) gave the performance at the Pepsi Center an "A", citing "From minute one, Turner bursts onto the stage with energy and finesse that only the Queen will process. Belting out her memorable hits, Turner proves it doesn't take media trickery to have success. She may be rolling down the river but Turner is creating an untouchable path. "

Martine Bury (VIBE) praised Turner's performance at the Allstate Arena, "From her signature rendition of Creedence Clearwater Revival's 'Proud Mary' to the way she heats up dance floors with her most recent single, 'When the Heartache is Over' that sultry, gravelly voice tells ardent stories like no other."

== Broadcasts and recordings ==
The opening night of the tour at the Target Center in Minneapolis, Minnesota, aired live on VH1's Opening Night Live on March 23, 2000. The concert at the Sopot Hippodrom aired on TVP1 on August 15, 2000. An additional television broadcast aired on BBC Three. The concert footage was filmed at the Oakland Arena performance on May 8, 2000. The performances filmed at the Wembley Stadium were later used for the DVD release in 2001 and aired on the CBS Network in the United States. The DVD was certified platinum in the US and UK. The concert at Groningen was filmed and broadcast locally. (Footage is available on YouTube and other websites.)

== Personnel ==
- Production Manager: Jake Berry
- Lighting Designer: Roy Bennett
- Video Director: Christine Strand
- FOH Sound Engineer: Dave Natale
- Lighting Director: Jeff Pavey

Band

- Drums: Jack Bruno
- Piano: Joel Campbell
- Supporting vocals: Joel Campbell, Ollie Marland, John Miles, James Ralston
- Keyboards: Euge Groove and Ollie Marland
- Saxophone and Percussions: Euge Groove
- Bass guitar: Warren McRae
- Guitar: John Miles and James Ralston
- Harmonica: John Miles
- Backing vocals: Stacey Campbell, Solange Guenier, Lisa Fischer (EU/NA-II), Gloria Reuben (NA-I) and Claire Louise Turton
- Dancers: Stacey Campbell, Solange Guenier, Lisa Fischer (EU/NA-II), Gloria Reuben (NA-I) and Claire Louise Turton, Ivona Brnelić

== See also ==
- List of highest-grossing concert tours
- List of highest-grossing concert tours by women
