= Wildest Dreams Tour =

1996–97 concert tour by Tina Turner

- Tour by Tina Turner
- Promotional poster for the tour
- Location: Africa; Asia; Australasia; Europe; North America
- Associated album: Wildest Dreams
- Start date: April 13, 1996
- End date: August 10, 1997
- Legs: 5
- No. of shows: 259
- Attendance: 4.5 million
- Box office: $150 million ($261 million in 2025 dollars) [Europe & N. America]

Tina Turner concert chronology
- What's Love? Tour (1993); Wildest Dreams Tour (1996–1997); Twenty Four Seven Tour (2000)

The Wildest Dreams Tour was the ninth concert tour by the singer Tina Turner. The tour supported her ninth studio album Wildest Dreams (1996). The tour was Turner's biggest, performing over 250 shows in Europe, North America and Australasia—surpassing her Break Every Rule Tour. Lasting nearly 16 months, the tour continued her success as a major concert draw. The European leg alone sold 3 million tickets and generated an estimated US$100 million. The tour further grossed around US$30 million in North America. It was sponsored by Hanes, as Turner became the spokesperson for their new hosiery line.

== Background ==
Shortly after the release of the James Bond theme "GoldenEye", Turner announced that she would embark on a tour in 1996. In April 1996, Turner performed a private concert for the niece of Sultan Hassanal Bolkiah of Brunei. The tour officially began with five dates in Singapore and South Africa. While performing in Johannesburg, Turner was joined onstage by Vusa Dance Company to perform "Do What You Do". After the performance, Turner approached dancer David Matamela and gave him a scholarship to the Alvin Ailey Dance School. Despite high ticket prices, Turner's four South African stadium dates proved to be a success by drawing a total of 129,000 people. During rehearsals, Turner was not impressed with the stage design. She felt the stage was too dark and felt awkward to perform on. It was later reworked to Turner's liking. Elements of the stage can be seen in Turner's 50th Anniversary Tour.

While promoting the North American leg of the tour, it was announced talk show personality Oprah Winfrey would follow the tour with her syndicated talk show from Houston to New York City. Winfrey described the event as her dream stating,

"She is our goddess of rock 'n' roll. We are going to be right there with Miss Tina. We're going on tour with Tina. 'The Oprah Show' is actually going on the road with Tina. I am the biggest Tina Turner fan there is. It is my wildest dream."

In her own words, Turner believed this could be her best tour in North America. She further commented,

"It could be my best tour ever in America. When I walk on stage, there's such a feeling of faces looking back at me with love and admiration. [And] it turns into a togetherness. It really is about a desire from the people. The last tour I actually announced to my audience that I would be back. It was only because of that feeling, because that's the kind of audience I have."

=== Death of Kenny Moore ===
During the tour, pianist Kenny Moore suffered health problems. In Sydney, New South Wales, he was admitted to the hospital and later pronounced deceased due to apoplexy. Moore had worked with Turner since 1977. Chuckii Booker replaced Moore for the remaining dates of the tour. Turner dedicated every performance thereafter to Moore.

=== Bomb scare in New Zealand ===
After successfully touring New Zealand with her last feat, Turner returned to an expanded tour in the region. The leg proved to be a success for Turner as dates quickly sold out. However, during her concert in Wellington, New Zealand, Turner was removed from the stage and the building was later evacuated by local police due to a possible bomb at the venue. After a full sweep of the building, Turner resumed the concert nearly three hours later. The same incident happened in Palmerston North.

== Broadcasts and recordings ==
Microsoft Music Central joined Turner on tour to give spectators a "behind the scenes" diary. Entries are written by Turner and her crew as they performed throughout Australasia and North America. The program also contained backstage footage and photos, along with, exclusive concert footage, music videos, and interviews with Turner and Oprah Winfrey.

Additionally, Turner's performance in Johannesburg was broadcast on SABC 3 in April 1996. Turner's Moscow performance was broadcast on Channel One.

Before Turner toured North America, The Showtime Network aired her September 1996 concert from the Amsterdam ArenA in Amsterdam Netherlands on April 1, 1997. The concert footage was later made available on VHS in September 1997, followed by a DVD released in 1999. The DVD contained an interview with Turner as well as the music video for "Whatever You Want".

In 1998, the VHS was nominated for a Grammy in the Best Long Form Music Video category, losing to "Jagged Little Pill, Live".

Additional concert footage was displayed on "The Oprah Winfrey Show", she and her television show followed the tour from The Woodlands to New York City. In return, Turner performed a private concert on June 4, 1997, at the historic Navy Pier in Chicago, Illinois for the annual PROMAX International.

== Band ==
- Drums: Jack Bruno
- Guitar: James Ralston and John Miles
- Bass guitar: Bob Feit and Warren McRae^{1}
- Keyboards: Ollie Marland and Timmy Cappello
- Saxophone: Timmy Cappello
- Percussion: Timmy Cappello
- Piano: Kenny Moore and Chuckii Booker^{2}
- Supporting vocals: Chuckii Booker, James Ralston, John Miles, Kenny Moore, Timmy Cappello Ollie Marland, Karen Owens, Sharon Owens and Cynthia Davila
- Dancers: Karen Owens, Sharon Owens and Cynthia Davila

^{1}March–August 1997
^{2}Replaced Moore after his death in March 1997.

== Opening acts ==
- Keb' Mo' (Munich, Germany)
- Jimmy Barnes (Australasia)
- Cyndi Lauper (North America)
- Belinda Carlisle (England, December 1996)
- Tony Joe White (New Zealand)
- The Accelerators (Paris, May 1996)
- Brian Kennedy (Dublin and London, July 1996)
- Toto (Gateshead, Alton, Sheffield and London, July 1996)
- Peter Andre (Alton)
- Chris Isaak (Wantagh)
- Grace Jones (Moscow, Russia)

== Setlist ==
Asia/Africa

Act 1

1. "Whatever You Want"
2. Do What You Do
3. Thief of Hearts
4. "On Silent Wings"
5. "Missing You"
6. "In Your Wildest Dreams"

Act 2

7. "GoldenEye"
8. "River Deep – Mountain High"
9. "Private Dancer"

Act 3

10. "We Don't Need Another Hero (Thunderdome)"
11. "Let's Stay Together"
12. "Undercover Agent for the Blues"
13. "Steamy Windows"
14. "Better Be Good to Me"

Act 4

15. "Addicted To Love"
16. "The Best"
17. "What's Love Got to Do with It"
18. "Proud Mary"

Encore

19. "Nutbush City Limits"
20. "Unfinished Sympathy"
Europe/Australasia/North America

Act 1

1. "Whatever You Want"
2. "Do What You Do"
3. "River Deep – Mountain High"
4. "Missing You"
5. "In Your Wildest Dreams"

Act 2

6. "GoldenEye"
7. "Private Dancer"

Act 3

8. "We Don't Need Another Hero (Thunderdome)"
9. "Let's Stay Together"
10. "I Can't Stand the Rain"
11. "Undercover Agent for the Blues"
12. "Steamy Windows"
13. "Giving It Up for Your Love"
14. "Better Be Good to Me"

Act 4

15. "Addicted to Love"
16. "The Best"
17. "What's Love Got to Do with It"
18. "Proud Mary"

Encore

19. "Nutbush City Limits"
20. "On Silent Wings"

=== Additional notes ===
- During performances in Paris (May 1996), Turner performed "Unfinished Symphony" with Bruce Willis and his band, "The Accelerators".
- During the performances in Amsterdam, the Netherlands, Turner performed "Something Beautiful Remains" for the concert filming.

== Tour dates ==
Date	City	Country	Venue
Asia
April 13, 1996	Kallang	Singapore	Singapore Indoor Stadium
Africa
April 16, 1996	Cape Town	South Africa	Newlands Cricket Ground
April 18, 1996	Durban	South Africa	Kings Park Stadium
April 21, 1996	Johannesburg	South Africa	JHB Stadium
April 22, 1996	Johannesburg	South Africa	JHB Stadium
Europe
May 1, 1996^{[A]}	Ischgl	Austria	Silvrettaseilbahn AG
May 3, 1996	Paris	France	Palais Omnisports de Paris-Bercy
May 4, 1996	Paris	France	Palais Omnisports de Paris-Bercy
May 5, 1996	Paris	France	Palais Omnisports de Paris-Bercy
May 6, 1996	Lyon	France	Halle Tony Garnier
May 9, 1996	Ghent	Belgium	Flanders Expo
May 10, 1996	Ghent	Belgium	Flanders Expo
May 11, 1996	Ghent	Belgium	Flanders Expo
May 12, 1996	Ghent	Belgium	Flanders Expo
May 13, 1996	Ghent	Belgium	Flanders Expo
May 16, 1996	Rotterdam	Netherlands	Sportpaleis
May 17, 1996	Rotterdam	Netherlands	Sportpaleis
May 18, 1996	Rotterdam	Netherlands	Sportpaleis
May 19, 1996	Rotterdam	Netherlands	Sportpaleis
May 23, 1996	Rotterdam	Netherlands	Sportpaleis
May 24, 1996	Rotterdam	Netherlands	Sportpaleis
May 25, 1996	Rotterdam	Netherlands	Sportpaleis
May 26, 1996	Rotterdam	Netherlands	Sportpaleis
May 30, 1996	Munich	Germany	Olympiahalle
May 31, 1996	Munich	Germany	Olympiahalle
June 1, 1996	Munich	Germany	Olympiahalle
June 2, 1996	Munich	Germany	Olympiahalle
June 6, 1996	Stockholm	Sweden	Stockholm Globe Arena
June 7, 1996	Stockholm	Sweden	Stockholm Globe Arena
June 8, 1996	Stockholm	Sweden	Stockholm Globe Arena
June 9, 1996	Gothenburg	Sweden	Scandinavium
June 12, 1996	Oslo	Norway	Oslo Spektrum
June 13, 1996	Oslo	Norway	Oslo Spektrum
June 14, 1996	Oslo	Norway	Oslo Spektrum
June 15, 1996	Oslo	Norway	Oslo Spektrum
June 16, 1996	Bremen	Germany	Weserstadion
June 21, 1996	Copenhagen	Denmark	Parken Stadium
June 22, 1996	Hamburg	Germany	Volksparkstadion
June 23, 1996	Rostock	Germany	Ostseestadion
June 25, 1996	Maxéville	France	Zénith de Nancy
June 28, 1996	Dublin	Ireland	Croke Park
June 30, 1996	Edinburgh	Scotland	Murrayfield Stadium
July 3, 1996	Vienna	Austria	Ernst-Happel-Stadion
July 5, 1996	Basel	Switzerland	St. Jakob Stadium
July 7, 1996	Rome	Italy	Stadio Olimpico
July 8, 1996	Naples	Italy	Stadio Communale Cava
July 12, 1996	Gateshead	England	Gateshead International Stadium
July 13, 1996	Alton	England	Alton Towers
July 14, 1996	Cardiff	Wales	Cardiff Arms Park
July 18, 1996	Sheffield	England	Don Valley Stadium
July 20, 1996	London	England	Wembley Stadium
July 21, 1996	London	England	Wembley Stadium
July 22, 1996	London	England	Wembley Arena
July 24, 1996	Nîmes	France	Arena of Nîmes
July 25, 1996	Nîmes	France	Arena of Nîmes
July 27, 1996	Cologne	Germany	Müngersdorfer Stadion
July 28, 1996	Karlsruhe	Germany	Wildparkstadion
August 1, 1996	Berlin	Germany	Waldbühne
August 2, 1996	Berlin	Germany	Waldbühne
August 3, 1996	Berlin	Germany	Waldbühne
August 4, 1996	Berlin	Germany	Waldbühne
August 7, 1996	Helsinki	Finland	Helsinki Olympic Stadium
August 8, 1996	Kolding	Denmark	Kolding Stadion
August 9, 1996	Gothenburg	Sweden	Ullevi
August 10, 1996	Oslo	Norway	Oslo Spektrum
August 11, 1996	Oslo	Norway	Oslo Spektrum
August 18, 1996	Nice	France	Stade Charles Ehrmann
August 21, 1996	Budapest	Hungary	Népstadion
August 22, 1996	Prague	Czech Republic	Dannerůvstadion
August 25, 1996	Warsaw	Poland	Stadion Gwardii Warszawa
August 26, 1996	Ghent	Belgium	Flanders Expo
August 27, 1996	Ghent	Belgium	Flanders Expo
August 29, 1996	Ghent	Belgium	Flanders Expo
August 30, 1996	Ghent	Belgium	Flanders Expo
August 31, 1996	Ghent	Belgium	Flanders Expo
September 1, 1996	Ghent	Belgium	Flanders Expo
September 2, 1996	Ghent	Belgium	Flanders Expo
September 4, 1996	Luxembourg City	Luxembourg	Stade Josy Barthel
September 6, 1996	Amsterdam	Netherlands	Amsterdam Arena
September 7, 1996	Amsterdam	Netherlands	Amsterdam Arena
September 8, 1996	Amsterdam	Netherlands	Amsterdam Arena
September 11, 1996	Paris	France	Palais Omnisports de Paris-Bercy
September 12, 1996	Paris	France	Palais Omnisports de Paris-Bercy
September 13, 1996	Paris	France	Palais Omnisports de Paris-Bercy
September 14, 1996	Liévin	France	Stade Couvert Régional
September 17, 1996	Barcelona	Spain	Palau Sant Jordi
September 18, 1996	Barcelona	Spain	Palau Sant Jordi
September 20, 1996	Istanbul	Turkey	BJK İnönü Stadium
September 22, 1996	Lisbon	Portugal	Estádio do Restelo
September 25, 1996	Milan	Italy	Forum di Assago
September 26, 1996	Milan	Italy	Forum di Assago
September 27, 1996	Bologna	Italy	PalaDozza
September 28, 1996	Bologna	Italy	PalaDozza
September 30, 1996	Lyon	France	Halle Tony Garnier
October 2, 1996	Munich	Germany	Olympiahalle
October 3, 1996	Munich	Germany	Olympiahalle
October 4, 1996	Munich	Germany	Olympiahalle
October 5, 1996	Munich	Germany	Olympiahalle
October 6, 1996	Munich	Germany	Olympiahalle
October 7, 1996	Munich	Germany	Olympiahalle
October 10, 1996	Kiel	Germany	Ostseehalle
October 11, 1996	Kiel	Germany	Ostseehalle
October 12, 1996	Hanover	Germany	Europahalle
October 13, 1996	Hanover	Germany	Europahalle
October 17, 1996	Maastricht	Netherlands	Maastricht Exhibition & Congress Centre
October 18, 1996	Leipzig	Germany	Leipziger Messehalle
October 19, 1996	Leipzig	Germany	Leipziger Messehalle
October 20, 1996	Leipzig	Germany	Leipziger Messehalle
October 23, 1996	Toulon	France	Zénith Oméga
October 25, 1996	Dortmund	Germany	Westfalenhalle
October 26, 1996	Dortmund	Germany	Westfalenhalle
October 27, 1996	Dortmund	Germany	Westfalenhalle
October 30, 1996	Zürich	Switzerland	Hallenstadion
October 31, 1996	Zürich	Switzerland	Hallenstadion
November 5, 1996	Moscow	Russia	State Kremlin Palace
November 6, 1996	Moscow	Russia	State Kremlin Palace
November 7, 1996	Moscow	Russia	State Kremlin Palace
November 9, 1996	Stuttgart	Germany	Hanns-Martin-Schleyer-Halle
November 10, 1996	Stuttgart	Germany	Hanns-Martin-Schleyer-Halle
November 13, 1996	Frankfurt	Germany	Festhalle
November 14, 1996	Frankfurt	Germany	Festhalle
November 15, 1996	Frankfurt	Germany	Festhalle
November 16, 1996	Frankfurt	Germany	Festhalle
November 18, 1996	London	England	Wembley Arena
November 19, 1996	London	England	Wembley Arena
November 20, 1996	London	England	Wembley Arena
November 21, 1996	London	England	Wembley Arena
November 23, 1996	Heerenveen	Netherlands	IJsstadion Thialf
November 24, 1996	Heerenveen	Netherlands	IJsstadion Thialf
November 25, 1996	Dortmund	Germany	Westfalenhalle
November 28, 1996	Sheffield	England	Sheffield Arena
November 29, 1996	Sheffield	England	Sheffield Arena
November 30, 1996	Sheffield	England	Sheffield Arena
December 1, 1996	Glasgow	Scotland	SECC Concert Hall 4
December 2, 1996	Glasgow	Scotland	SECC Concert Hall 4
December 4, 1996	Manchester	England	NYNEX Arena
December 5, 1996	Manchester	England	NYNEX Arena
December 6, 1996	Manchester	England	NYNEX Arena
December 7, 1996	Manchester	England	NYNEX Arena
December 10, 1996	Birmingham	England	NEC Arena
December 11, 1996	Birmingham	England	NEC Arena
December 12, 1996	Birmingham	England	NEC Arena
December 13, 1996	Birmingham	England	NEC Arena
December 14, 1996	Birmingham	England	NEC Arena
December 18, 1996	London	England	Wembley Arena
December 16, 1996	London	England	Wembley Arena
December 17, 1996	London	England	Wembley Arena
December 19, 1996	London	England	Wembley Arena
December 20, 1996	London	England	Wembley Arena
Australasia
February 27, 1997	Canberra	Australia	Royal Theater
March 3, 1997	Launceston	Australia	Silverdome
March 4, 1997	Hobart	Australia	Derwent Entertainment Center
March 5, 1997	Hobart	Australia	Derwent Entertainment Center
March 8, 1997	Newcastle	Australia	Newcastle Entertainment Center
March 11, 1997	Sydney	Australia	Sydney Entertainment Centre
March 12, 1997	Sydney	Australia	Sydney Entertainment Centre
March 15, 1997	Brisbane	Australia	Brisbane Entertainment Centre
March 18, 1997	Melbourne	Australia	Centre Court
March 19, 1997	Melbourne	Australia	Centre Court
March 21, 1997	Melbourne	Australia	Centre Court
March 25, 1997	Townsville	Australia	Townsville Entertainment Centre
March 27, 1997	Cairns	Australia	Cairns Showgrounds
March 29, 1997	Darwin	Australia	Garden Amphitheater
March 31, 1997	Adelaide	Australia	Adelaide Entertainment Centre
April 3, 1997	Perth	Australia	Perth Entertainment Centre
April 4, 1997	Perth	Australia	Perth Entertainment Centre
April 5, 1997	Perth	Australia	Perth Entertainment Centre
April 9, 1997	Wellington	New Zealand	Queen's Wharf Events Centre
April 10, 1997	Wellington	New Zealand	Queen's Wharf Events Centre
April 12, 1997	Auckland	New Zealand	Ericsson Stadium
April 13, 1997	New Plymouth	New Zealand	TSB Stadium
April 15, 1997	Palmerston North	New Zealand	Palmerston North Showgrounds
April 16, 1997	Palmerston North	New Zealand	Palmerston North Showgrounds
April 18, 1997	Nelson	New Zealand	Trafalgar Park
April 20, 1997	Christchurch	New Zealand	Lancaster Park
North America
May 1, 1997	The Woodlands	United States	Cynthia Woods Mitchell Pavilion
May 2, 1997	The Woodlands	United States	Cynthia Woods Mitchell Pavilion
May 3, 1997	San Antonio	United States	Alamodome
May 4, 1997	Dallas	United States	Coca-Cola Starplex Amphitheatre
May 6, 1997	Albuquerque	United States	Tingley Coliseum
May 7, 1997	Phoenix	United States	America West Arena
May 9, 1997	San Diego	United States	San Diego Sports Arena
May 10, 1997	Las Vegas	United States	MGM Grand Garden Arena
May 12, 1997	Los Angeles	United States	Greek Theatre
May 13, 1997	Los Angeles	United States	Greek Theatre
May 15, 1997	Los Angeles	United States	Greek Theatre
May 16, 1997	Los Angeles	United States	Greek Theatre
May 17, 1997	Anaheim	United States	Arrowhead Pond of Anaheim
May 18, 1997	Los Angeles	United States	Greek Theatre
May 20, 1997	Fresno	United States	Selland Arena
May 21, 1997	Concord	United States	Concord Pavilion
May 22, 1997	Sacramento	United States	Cal Expo Amphitheatre
May 23, 1997	Mountain View	United States	Shoreline Amphitheatre
May 24, 1997	George	United States	Gorge Amphitheatre
May 25, 1997	Vancouver	Canada	General Motors Place
May 29, 1997	Salt Lake City	United States	Delta Center
May 30, 1997	Greenwood Village	United States	Fiddler's Green Amphitheatre
May 31, 1997	Greenwood Village	United States	Fiddler's Green Amphitheatre
June 1, 1997	Minneapolis	United States	Northrop Auditorium
June 2, 1997	Bonner Springs	United States	Sandstone Amphitheater
June 3, 1997	Maryland Heights	United States	Riverport Amphitheater
June 6, 1997	Nashville	United States	Starwood Amphitheatre
June 7, 1997	Memphis	United States	Pyramid Arena
June 8, 1997	Birmingham	United States	BJCC Coliseum
June 9, 1997	New Orleans	United States	Lakefront Arena
June 11, 1997	West Palm Beach	United States	Coral Sky Amphitheatre
June 12, 1997	Orlando	United States	Orlando Arena
June 13, 1997	Tampa	United States	Ice Palace
June 14, 1997	Atlanta	United States	Lakewood Amphitheatre
June 15, 1997	Atlanta	United States	Lakewood Amphitheatre
June 16, 1997	North Charleston	United States	North Charleston Coliseum
June 17, 1997	Knoxville	United States	Thompson–Boling Arena
June 18, 1997	Charlotte	United States	Blockbuster Pavilion
June 19, 1997	Raleigh	United States	Walnut Creek Amphitheatre
June 20, 1997	Richmond	United States	Classic Amphitheatre
June 21, 1997	Bristow	United States	Nissan Pavilion
June 22, 1997	Columbus	United States	Polaris Amphitheater
June 23, 1997	Clarkston	United States	Pine Knob Music Theatre
June 24, 1997	Clarkston	United States	Pine Knob Music Theatre
June 25, 1997	Cincinnati	United States	Riverbend Music Center
June 27, 1997	Moline	United States	MARK of the Quad Cities
June 28, 1997	Tinley Park	United States	New World Music Theatre
June 29, 1997	Milwaukee	United States	Marcus Amphitheater
July 2, 1997	Winston-Salem	United States	Lawrence Joel Veterans Memorial Coliseum
July 3, 1997	Virginia Beach	United States	GTE Virginia Beach Amphitheater
July 5, 1997	Montreal	Canada	Molson Centre
July 6, 1997	Ottawa	Canada	Corel Centre
July 7, 1997	Toronto	Canada	Molson Amphitheatre
July 9, 1997	Darien	United States	Darien Lake Performing Arts Center
July 10, 1997	Burgettstown	United States	Coca-Cola Star Lake Amphitheater
July 11, 1997	Camden	United States	Blockbuster-Sony Music Entertainment Centre
July 12, 1997	Atlantic City	United States	Etess Arena
July 13, 1997	Saratoga Springs	United States	Saratoga Performing Arts Center
July 15, 1997	Wallingford	United States	SNET Oakdale Theatre
July 16, 1997	Wallingford	United States	SNET Oakdale Theatre
July 18, 1997	Mansfield	United States	Great Woods Center for the Performing Arts
July 19, 1997	Mansfield	United States	Great Woods Center for the Performing Arts
July 20, 1997	Holmdel Township	United States	PNC Bank Arts Center
July 22, 1997	New York City	United States	Radio City Music Hall
July 23, 1997	New York City	United States	Radio City Music Hall
July 25, 1997	New York City	United States	Radio City Music Hall
July 26, 1997	New York City	United States	Radio City Music Hall
July 27, 1997	New York City	United States	Radio City Music Hall
July 29, 1997	New York City	United States	Radio City Music Hall
July 30, 1997	New York City	United States	Radio City Music Hall
August 1, 1997	Wantagh	United States	Jones Beach Amphitheater
August 2, 1997	Wantagh	United States	Jones Beach Amphitheater
August 3, 1997	Mansfield	United States	Great Woods Center for the Performing Arts
August 5, 1997	Noblesville	United States	Deer Creek Music Center
August 6, 1997	Cleveland	United States	Gund Arena
August 8, 1997	University Park	United States	Bryce Jordan Center
August 9, 1997	Atlantic City	United States	Etess Arena
August 10, 1997	Hartford	United States	Meadows Music Theater

Cancellations and rescheduled shows

November 3, 1996	Geneva, Switzerland	SEG Geneva Arena	Cancelled
April 19, 1997	Temuka, New Zealand	Temuka Domain Oval	Cancelled
May 3, 1997	Austin, Texas	Frank Erwin Center	This performance was moved to the Alamodome in San Antonio.
May 22, 1997	Sacramento, California	ARCO Arena	This performance was moved to the Cal Expo Amphitheater.
June 17, 1997	Holmdel Township, New Jersey	PNC Bank Arts Center	This performance was moved to July 20, 1997
June 26, 1997	Noblesville, Indiana	Deer Creek Music Center	This performance was moved to August 5, 1997

Festivals and other miscellaneous performances
^{A} This concert is a part of Festival Ischgl/Top of the Mountain Concert

=== Box office score data ===
Venue	City	Tickets sold / available	Gross revenue
Flanders Expo	Ghent	74,250 / 74,250 (100%)	$2,722,500
Croke Park	Dublin	40,000 / 40,000 (100%)	$1,510,000
Cynthia Woods Mitchell Pavilion	The Woodlands	26,072 / 26,072 (100%)	$539,550
Alamodome	San Antonio	18,019 / 18,019 (100%)	$433,243
Coca-Cola Starplex Amphitheatre	Dallas	18,380 / 18,380 (100%)	$324,694
America West Arena	Phoenix	12,504 / 12,504 (100%)	$442,355
MGM Grand Garden Arena	Las Vegas	13,267 / 13,267 (100%)	$536,208
Greek Theatre	Los Angeles	30,088 / 30,088 (100%)	$1,194,346
Arrowhead Pond of Anaheim	Anaheim	12,505 / 12,755 (98%)	$465,920
Gorge Amphitheatre	George	18,066 / 20,000 (90%)	$530,825
Nissan Pavilion	Bristow	17,893 / 17,893 (100%)	$530,825
Molson Centre	Montreal	13,189 / 14,114 (93%)	$485,482
Blockbuster-Sony Music Entertainment Centre	Camden	11,764 / 24,967 (47%)	$386,071
Radio City Music Hall	New York City	41,650 / 41,650 (100%)	$2,651,000
Jones Beach Amphitheater	Wantagh	21,814 / 21,814 (100%)	$850,400
TOTAL		369,461 / 385,773 (96%)	$13,374,510

== See also ==
- List of highest-grossing concert tours
- List of highest-grossing concert tours by women
