= In Your Wildest Dreams (song) =

1996 single by Tina Turner and Barry White

Single by Tina Turner and Barry White

from the album Wildest Dreams
- Released: November 1996
- Length: 3:58
- Label: Parlophone
- Songwriters: Mike Chapman; Holly Knight
- Producer: Trevor Horn

Tina Turner singles chronology
"Something Beautiful Remains" (1996)	"In Your Wildest Dreams" (1996)	"Cose della vita - Can't Stop Thinking of You" (1997)

Barry White singles chronology
"Slow Jams" (1995)	"In Your Wildest Dreams" (1996)	"Staying Power" (1999)

"In Your Wildest Dreams" is a duet by American singers Tina Turner and Barry White, released from Turner's ninth solo studio album, Wildest Dreams (1996). The original European album version features spoken vocals by actor Antonio Banderas, while for the single version and US edition of the Wildest Dreams album, Turner re-recorded the track with White.

Released in November 1996, by Parlophone, "In Your Wildest Dreams" was the sixth and final single released from the album and was issued in a wide range of formats and versions; the promo 12-inch singles featured remixes by, among others, Deep Dish and Pink Noise. Certain European CD singles also included two live recordings from the Wildest Dreams Tour, "Missing You" and "GoldenEye". While the song failed to chart on the US Billboard Hot 100, peaking at number one on the Billboard Bubbling Under Hot 100, it found more success abroad, reaching number two in Austria and charting within the top 40 in Flanders, Germany, New Zealand, Norway, and the United Kingdom.

The version of "In Your Wildest Dreams" featuring Antonio Banderas was included on Turner's 2004 hits compilation All the Best.

== Critical reception ==
Larry Flick from Billboard magazine remarked that the duet "pits her feline purr against White's seductive growl on top of a slow and shuffling funk groove." He also noted that the single features Turner's duet with Antonio Banderas, saying, "This version is actually a bit sexier, riddled with ear-grabbing electro-pop riffs. Check out both versions and pick your fave." A reviewer from Music Week rated the song three out of five, adding that "the presence of White's deep, seductive vocals entices Turner into her most soulful effort for ages, but it cannot cover up the shortcomings of the song."

== Music video ==
The American music video for the song was created by the Aardman Animation Studio, and features claymation versions of Turner and White in comical situations with cameos by Antonio Banderas and Wallace and Gromit.

== Track listing and formats ==
- Europe, CD maxi-single
1. "In Your Wildest Dream" – 3:58
2. "Better Be Good to Me" – 3:39
3. "Nutbush City Limits" (The 90's Version) – 3:44
4. "In Your Wildest Dreams" (Joe Remix) – 4:49
- UK CD1
1. "In Your Wildest Dream" – 3:58
2. "In Your Wildest Dreams" (Joe Urban Extended Mix) – 5:25
3. "In Your Wildest Dream" (Antonio Slow Mix) – 3:51
- UK CD2
1. "In Your Wildest Dream"
2. "What's Love Got to Do with It"
3. "GoldenEye" (live)
4. "Missing You" (live)
- Australia, CD single
1. "In Your Wildest Dream" – 3:58
2. "Better Be Good to Me" – 3:39
3. "Nutbush City Limits" (The 90's Version) – 3:44
- US, CD single
1. "In Your Wildest Dream" (LP edit) – 3:47
2. "In Your Wildest Dream" (Joe Remix Edit) – 3:52
3. "In Your Wildest Dream" (Antonio Banderas Latin Mix) – 4:01
4. "In Your Wildest Dream" (Crossover Mix) – 3:52
- US, 12-inch single

A1: "In Your Wildest Dream" (Pink Noise Clube Mix) – 5:30
A2: "In Your Wildest Dream" (Deep Dish Paradise Mix Edit) – 4:56
A3: "In Your Wildest Dream" (Pleasant Instrumental) – 5:23
B1: "In Your Wildest Dream" (Joe Extended Remix) – 5:22
B2: "In Your Wildest Dream" (Antonio Banderas Crossover Mix) – 3:50
B3: "In Your Wildest Dream" (Crossover Mix) – 3:50

- US, cassette single

A1: "In Your Wildest Dream" (LP edit) – 3:47
A2: "In Your Wildest Dream" (Joe Remix Edit) – 3:49
B1: "In Your Wildest Dream" (Antonio Banderas Latin Mix) – 3:59
B2: "In Your Wildest Dream" (Antonio Banderas Crossover Mix) – 3:50

== Charts ==
=== Weekly charts ===
Chart (1996–1997)	Peak position
Austria (Ö3 Austria Top 40)	2
Belgium (Ultratop 50 Flanders)	18
Canada Adult Contemporary (RPM)	48
Europe (Eurochart Hot 100)	24
Germany (GfK)	32
Netherlands (Dutch Top 40 Tipparade)	19
Netherlands (Single Top 100)	77
New Zealand (Recorded Music NZ)	22
Norway (VG-lista)	15
Scottish Singles Sales (Official Charts)	27
UK Singles (Official Charts)	32
UK Hip Hop/R&B (Official Charts)	9
US Bubbling Under Hot 100 (Billboard)	1
US Hot R&B/Hip-Hop Songs (Billboard)	34

=== Year-end charts ===
Chart (1997)	Position
Austria (Ö3 Austria Top 40)	36
