= Temuka Oval =

Cricket ground in Temuka, New Zealand

Coordinates: 44°14′52.62″S 171°16′59.15″E

- Location: Temuka, New Zealand
- Establishment: 1905 (first recorded match)
- As of 2 November 2011; Source: Ground profile

Temuka Oval (also known as the Temuka Domain) is a cricket ground in Temuka, Canterbury, New Zealand. The first recorded match held on the ground came in 1905 when South Canterbury played North Otago. The ground later held a single first-class match in 1978 when Young New Zealand played a touring England XI, which resulted in an innings and 23 run victory for the England XI.

The oval was scheduled to hold a concert as part of Tina Turner's Wildest Dreams Tour on 19 April 1997, but this was cancelled.
