= Something Beautiful Remains =

Single by Tina Turner

from the album Wildest Dreams
- B-side: "Addicted to Love (Live)"
- Released: October 7, 1996
- Genre: R&B, pop, soul
- Length: 4:22
- Label: Parlophone Records
- Songwriters: Terry Britten & Graham Lyle
- Producer: Terry Britten

Tina Turner singles chronology
"Missing You" (1996)	"Something Beautiful Remains" (1996)	"In Your Wildest Dreams" (1996)

Music video
- "Something Beautiful Remains" on YouTube

"Something Beautiful Remains" is a single released by Grammy Award-winning singer Tina Turner in 1996 from Tina's Wildest Dreams album.

This single was released exclusively in Europe and the version used was the Joe Urban Remix Edit, a slightly different edit was later included as a hidden track on the U.S. edition of the Wildest Dreams album.

As shown in the promo video, on certain dates of the 1996/1997 Wildest Dreams Tour, the track was played as the final encore. In 2004, the original Wildest Dreams album version of the song was the closing track on the hits compilation All the Best.

In 2023, the song was remixed by producer Terry Britten, a long-time collaborator of Turner, and received the shorter title "Something Beautiful". This version appears on the greatest hits compilation Queen of Rock ‘n’ Roll.

== Versions ==
- Album version – 4:22
- 'Joe' Urban Remix
- 'Joe' Urban Remix Edit
- Something Beautiful - 5:17

== Chart performance ==
Chart performance for "Something Beautiful Remains"
Chart (1996–1997)	Peak position
Belgium (Ultratip Bubbling Under Flanders)	15
Europe (European Hot 100 Singles)	86
Scottish Singles Sales (Official Charts)	21
UK Singles (Official Charts)	27
