= Harriet (singer) =

English dance-pop singer (born 1966)

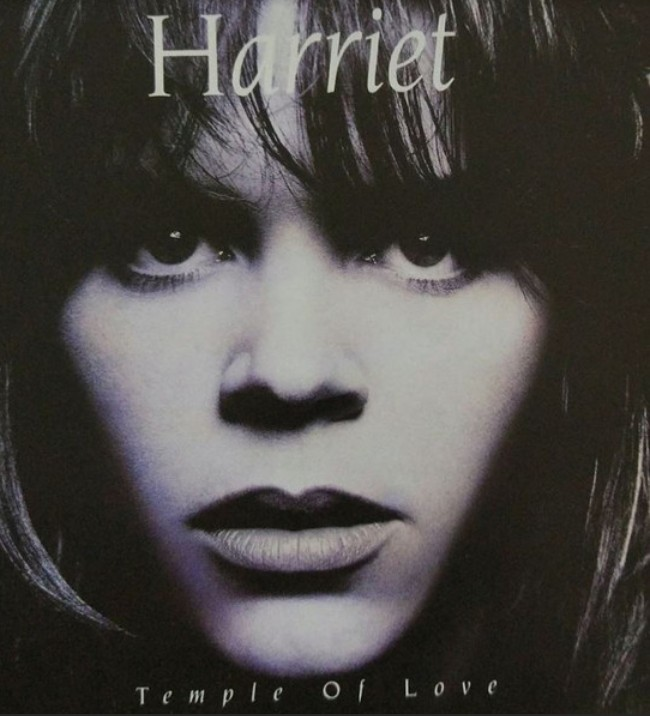
- artwork for "Temple of Love"

Background information
- Born: Harriet Roberts; 8 September 1966 (age 59); Sheffield, England
- Genres: Dance-pop
- Occupations: Singer, songwriter
- Years active: 1990–present
- Label: East West Records

Harriet (born Harriet Roberts, 8 September 1966, Sheffield, England) is an English dance-pop singer. She released two singles, "Woman to Man" and "Temple of Love", in 1990, on EastWest/Atlantic Records. "Temple of Love" cracked the US Billboard Hot 100 in 1991, peaking at #39. Her single also reached #14 on the US Billboard R&B chart. Harriet released an album, Woman To Man on East West Records, but is remembered only as a one-hit wonder in the US.

In 1991 Harriet took part in the Italian Song Festival in San Remo with the English version of the song "In questa città" (written by Pino Daniele and performed in Italian by Loredana Bertè). The English version was titled, "All That We Are".

She co-wrote the song "Whatever You Need" with Russ Courtenay for Tina Turner's 1999 album, Twenty Four Seven.

In 2014 she released the digital album Reality containing ten tracks, under the name Harriet Roberts.
