= Whatever You Want (Tina Turner song) =

1996 single by Tina Turner

Single by Tina Turner

from the album Wildest Dreams
- B-side: "Unfinished Sympathy" "GoldenEye"
- Released: March 4, 1996 (EU); March 11, 1996 (UK)
- Length: 4:45
- Label: Parlophone
- Songwriters: Arthur Baker; Fred Zarr; Taylor Dayne
- Producer: Trevor Horn

Tina Turner singles chronology
| "GoldenEye" (1995) | "Whatever You Want" (1996) | "On Silent Wings" (1996) |

Music video
- "Whatever You Want" on YouTube

"Whatever You Want" is a song performed by American recording artist Tina Turner from her ninth studio album, Wildest Dreams (1996). It was written by Arthur Baker, Fred Zarr, and Taylor Dayne and is noted for its different levels of energy and strong vocal performance, as well as its orchestral arrangement and complex production, courtesy of producer Trevor Horn.

The song was released as the lead single from the album in March 1996 by Parlophone Records and was the opening number on her Wildest Dreams Tour same year. The song became a moderate success on the charts, reaching top ten in Czech Republic, Estonia, Finland, Hungary, Israel and Italy, while reaching the top twenty in the Netherlands, New Zealand and Switzerland. The accompanying music video was directed by Stéphane Sednaoui.

== Critical reception ==
Ross Jones from The Guardian complimented the song as "epic", adding that "this is Trevor Horn's finest, most expensive sounding production in years". A reviewer from Music Week gave it a score of four out of five, writing, "It's a simple song, but sung with all her usual gusto and a useful preview for her first new album in six years." Damien Mendis from the Record Mirror Dance Update gave the remix five out of five, stating that the original "has been gloriously produced" by Horn. He added further that Todd Terry "has tackled the Phil Spector-style production and turned it into a way cool Frozen Sum mix that, although minimalist, is effective enough to keep dancefloors jumpin' and speakers pumpin'." Also Gavin Reeve from Smash Hits gave "Whatever You Want" four out of five, naming it a "corker". He added, "It's as atmospheric as 'GoldenEye', as steamy as 'Steamy Windows' and deserves to be a huge hit."

== Music video ==
A music video was produced to promote the single, directed by French director, photographer, film producer and actor Stéphane Sednaoui. It features Turner with futuristic special effects surrounding her. The special effects become more vigorous as the song progresses.

== Track listings ==
- CD single (CD1), UK (1996)
1. "Whatever You Want" — 4:47
2. "GoldenEye" (Single Edit) — 3:31
3. "Whatever You Want" (Album Version) — 6:00
- CD single (CD2), Europe (1996)
1. "Whatever You Want" (Album Version) — 6:04
2. "Unfinished Sympathy" — 4:41
3. "Unfinished Sympathy" (Extended Olympic Mix) — 8:19
4. "Whatever You Want" (Alternative Mix) — 4:48
- CD maxi-single, Europe (1996)
1. "Whatever You Want" — 4:45
2. "Unfinished Sympathy" — 4:36
3. "GoldenEye" (Single Edit) — 3:32

== Charts ==
=== Weekly charts ===
| Chart (1996) | Peak position |
|---|---|
| Australia (ARIA) | 94 |
| Austria (Ö3 Austria Top 40) | 27 |
| Belgium (Ultratop 50 Flanders) | 26 |
| Czech Republic (IFPI CR) | 8 |
| Estonia (Eesti Top 20) | 2 |
| Europe (Eurochart Hot 100) | 23 |
| Finland (Suomen virallinen lista) | 9 |
| Germany (GfK) | 53 |
| Hungary (Mahasz) | 6 |
| Iceland (Íslenski Listinn Topp 40) | 27 |
| Israel (Israeli Singles Chart) | 5 |
| Italy (Musica e dischi) | 5 |
| Italy Airplay (Music & Media) | 2 |
| Netherlands (Dutch Top 40) | 23 |
| Netherlands (Single Top 100) | 18 |
| New Zealand (Recorded Music NZ) | 16 |
| Scottish Singles Sales (Official Charts) | 20 |
| Sweden (Sverigetopplistan) | 36 |
| Switzerland (Schweizer Hitparade) | 18 |
| UK Singles (Official Charts) | 23 |
| UK Club Chart (Music Week) | 25 |

=== Year-end charts ===
| Chart (1996) | Position |
|---|---|
| Netherlands (Dutch Top 40) | 200 |

== Other versions ==
- The song was released as a 1998 single by Taylor Dayne from her album Naked Without You. It was remixed by Soul Solution and was a hit in the clubs, peaking at number 6 on the US Billboard dance chart. Taylor Dayne's version was remixed and re-released on 7 May 2005 on the "Whatever You Want"/"Naked Without You" remix EP (CPD 59572)
