= Don't Leave Me This Way (Tina Turner song) =

Single by Tina Turner

from the album Twenty Four Seven
- Released: February 14, 2000
- Studio: DreamHouse Studios (London, England)
- Genre: R&B; soul
- Length: 4:01
- Label: Parlophone
- Songwriters: Paul Barry, Brian Rawling, Mark Taylor
- Producers: Mark Taylor, Brian Rawling

Tina Turner singles chronology
"Whatever You Need" (2000)	"Don't Leave Me This Way" (2000)	"Open Arms" (2004)

"Don't Leave Me This Way" is a song by American recording artist Tina Turner. It was produced by Paul Barry, Mark Taylor and Brian Rawling, and originally released in the United Kingdom in 1998 by Emmerdale actress Malandra Burrows. The single reached number 54 on the UK Singles Chart, and was Burrows' second and final release for Warner Music. Turner re-recorded the song for her ninth and final solo album, Twenty Four Seven (1999), and released it as the album's third single in Germany in February 2000, where it became a minor hit.

== Track listing and formats ==
- German CD maxi single
1. "Don't Leave Me This Way"
2. "The Best" (Recorded Live in London '99)
3. "Steamy Windows" (Recorded Live in London '99)
4. "River Deep – Mountain High" (Recorded Live in London '99)

== Charts ==
Chart (2000)	Peak position
Czech Republic (IFPI)	16
Germany (Official German Charts)	78
