= GoldenEye (soundtrack) =

GoldenEye: Original Motion Picture Soundtrack from the United Artists film

Soundtrack album by Éric Serra
- Released: 14 November 1995
- Recorded: 1994–1995
- Genre: Soundtrack
- Length: 54:31
- Label: Virgin

Éric Serra chronology
Léon: The Professional (1994)	GoldenEye: Original Motion Picture Soundtrack from the United Artists film (1995)	The Fifth Element (1997)

Singles from GoldenEye: Original Motion Picture Soundtrack from the United Artists film
- 1. "GoldenEye" Released: 6 November 1995

Professional ratings
Review scores
Source	Rating
AllMusic	3/5 stars
Filmtracks	1/5 stars

GoldenEye: Original Motion Picture Soundtrack from the United Artists film is the soundtrack to the James Bond film of the same name and was composed by Éric Serra. It was released by Virgin Records on 14 November 1995. Serra composed and performed a number of synthesizer tracks, including the radically reworked version of the "James Bond Theme" that plays during the gun barrel sequence, while John Altman and David Arch provided the more traditional symphonic music. The producers had Altman write a more traditional, orchestral score piece for the tank-chase scene in Saint Petersburg, Russia. Serra's original, unused track for that sequence can still be found on the soundtrack album as "A Pleasant Drive in St. Petersburg".

The theme song "GoldenEye" was written by Bono and The Edge of the Irish rock band U2 and was performed by the American singer Tina Turner. The song was later covered by Nicole Scherzinger for the 2010 remake of the GoldenEye 007 video game.

The Swedish pop band Ace of Base was also involved at one point, producing a different theme song—also called "GoldenEye"—which does not appear in the film or soundtrack. This song was later released with slightly revised lyrics as "The Juvenile" on their fourth studio album Da Capo (2002), replacing the word "GoldenEye" with "Juvenile".

The soundtrack does not feature the comedic rendition of the Tammy Wynette song "Stand by Your Man" from the film, which was sung by Irina (Minnie Driver).

Starr Parodi and Jeff Eden Fair arranged, produced and recorded a version of the "James Bond Theme" for the GoldenEye trailer.

== Track listing ==
1. "GoldenEye" – Tina Turner
2. "The GoldenEye Overture: Half of Everything is Luck / The Other Half is Fate / For England, James" (Note: Contains the "James Bond Theme", originally composed for the Dr. No soundtrack.)
3. "Ladies First"
4. "We Share the Same Passions: The Trip to Cuba / The Same Passions"
5. "Little Surprise for You: Xenia / D.M. Mishkin"
6. "The Severnaya Suite: Among the Dead / Out of Hell / The Husky Tribe"
7. "Our Lady of Smolensk"
8. "Whispering Statues: Whispers / Two Faced"
9. "Run, Shoot, and Jump"
10. "A Pleasant Drive in St. Petersburg"
11. "Fatal Weakness"
12. "That's What Keeps You Alone"
13. "Dish out of Water: A Good Squeeze / The Antenna"
14. "The Scale to Hell: Boris and the Lethal Pen / I Am Invincible"
15. "For Ever, James"
16. "The Experience of Love" – Éric Serra

== Sales ==
Sales for GoldenEye
Region	Sales
Poland	13,500
