= Open Arms (Tina Turner song) =

2004 single by Tina Turner

Single by Tina Turner

from the album All the Best
- Released: October 25, 2004
- Length: 4:01
- Label: Parlophone
- Songwriter(s): Martin Brammer; Colette van Sertima; Ben Barson
- Producer(s): Jimmy Hogarth

Tina Turner singles chronology
"Don't Leave Me This Way" (2000)	"Open Arms" (2004)	"Complicated Disaster" (2005)

"Open Arms" is a song by American recording artist Tina Turner. It was written by Colette van Sertima, Ben Barson, and former Kane Gang member Martin Brammer and produced by Jimmy Hogarth for her compilation album All the Best (2004).

Released as the album's lead single towards the end of 2004, it became a top 40 success on most of the charts it appeared on, reaching the top five in Hungary and the top 30 in Italy and the United Kingdom. In the US, "Open Arms" peaked at number 15 on the Billboard Adult Contemporary chart.

== Track listing and formats ==
European CD single

1. "Open Arms" – 4:03
2. "The Best" (edit) – 4:09

European CD maxi single

1. "Open Arms" – 4:03
2. "Great Spirits" – 3:57
3. "Cose della vita - Can't Stop Thinking of You" (with Eros Ramazzotti) – 3:43
4. "Open Arms" (enhanced interview footage)

== Charts ==
=== Weekly charts ===
Weekly chart performance for "Open Arms"
Chart (2004–2005)	Peak position
Austria (Ö3 Austria Top 40)	31
Belgium (Ultratip Bubbling Under Flanders)	5
Belgium (Ultratip Bubbling Under Wallonia)	16
CIS Airplay (TopHit)	82
Germany (GfK)	33
Hungary (Rádiós Top 40)	2
Italy (FIMI)	21
Netherlands (Single Top 100)	54
Romania (Romanian Top 100)	52
Russia Airplay (TopHit)	55
Scotland (OCC)	20
Switzerland (Schweizer Hitparade)	32
UK Singles (OCC)	25
US Adult Contemporary (Billboard)	15
US Hot R&B/Hip-Hop Songs (Billboard)	70

=== Year-end charts ===
Year-end chart performance for "Open Arms"
Chart (2005)	Position
Hungary (Rádiós Top 40)	36
Russia Airplay (TopHit)	196
