= Wildest Dreams (Tina Turner album) =

Studio album by Tina Turner
- Released: April 1, 1996
- Recorded: Summer 1995 – early 1996
- Genres: Pop rock; soft rock; R&B; soul
- Length: 58:05
- Label: Parlophone
- Producers: Trevor Horn; Terry Britten

Tina Turner chronology
The Collected Recordings: Sixties to Nineties (1994)	Wildest Dreams (1996)	Twenty Four Seven (1999)

Alternative cover
- US cover art

Singles from Wildest Dreams
- 1. "GoldenEye" Released: November 6, 1995; 2. "Whatever You Want" Released: March 4, 1996; 3. "On Silent Wings" Released: May 27, 1996; 4. "Missing You" Released: July 15, 1996; 5. "Something Beautiful Remains" Released: October 7, 1996; 6. "In Your Wildest Dreams" Released: November 18, 1996

Professional ratings
Review scores
Source	Rating
AllMusic	2/5 stars
The Daily Vault	B−
Music Week	5/5 stars
Robert Christgau	(neither)
Rolling Stone	3/5 stars

Wildest Dreams is the eighth solo studio album by Tina Turner, released in Europe on April 1, 1996, by Parlophone internationally and Virgin Records in the US. Six singles were released from the album: the theme song for the 1995 James Bond film GoldenEye; "Whatever You Want"; "On Silent Wings" featuring Sting; "Missing You"; "Something Beautiful Remains"; and "In Your Wildest Dreams", a duet with Barry White. It has earned double platinum certifications in the United Kingdom and in Europe.

== Overview ==
The album includes the song "GoldenEye", the theme to the James Bond film of the same name. It was written by Bono and The Edge of the Irish band U2 and was recorded and released as a single in 1995. The song "Confidential" was written and co-produced for Turner by the British group Pet Shop Boys. The band's singer and lyricist, Neil Tennant, sings backing vocals on the track. The original Pet Shop Boys demo (with Tennant on vocals) can be found on the 2001 2-disc re-release of their album Very. "Unfinished Sympathy" is a cover of the Massive Attack song. The track "All Kinds of People" was co-written by Sheryl Crow. "In Your Wildest Dreams" was later re-recorded as a duet with Barry White and released as a single, reaching No. 32 in the UK Singles Chart. The duet version is included on the US version of the album, which has a different track listing, released some six months after it was first issued in Europe and most other parts of the world, and features an alternate cover. The album also features guest vocals from Sting on the track "On Silent Wings" which peaked at No. 13 in the UK. Wildest Dreams includes a total of six European single releases; "GoldenEye", "Whatever You Want"—co-written by Taylor Dayne, "On Silent Wings", Turner's cover version of John Waite's "Missing You", "Something Beautiful Remains" and the title track "In Your Wildest Dreams".

In 1997 the album was released as a limited edition special pack in Europe with a bonus disc including remixes, non-album tracks and live recordings from Turner's concert in Amsterdam on the Wildest Dreams Tour. The two-disc edition was released with the same cover picture as the US album.

== Track listings ==
Wildest Dreams track listing
No.	Title	Writer(s)	Length
1.	"Do What You Do"	Terry Britten; Graham Lyle; Conner Reeves	4:23
2.	"Whatever You Want"	Arthur Baker; Taylor Dayne; Fred Zarr	4:52
3.	"Missing You"	Mark Leonard; Chas Sandford; John Waite	4:36
4.	"On Silent Wings" (featuring Sting)	James Ralston; Tony Joe White	6:12
5.	"Thief of Hearts"	Jud Friedman; Hellmut Hattler; Joo Kraus; Allan Rich	4:05
6.	"In Your Wildest Dreams" (featuring Antonio Banderas)	Mike Chapman; Holly Knight	5:33
7.	"GoldenEye" (single edit)	Bono; The Edge	3:27
8.	"Confidential"	Chris Lowe; Neil Tennant	4:39
9.	"Something Beautiful Remains"	Britten; Lyle	4:20
10.	"All Kinds of People"	Sheryl Crow; Kevin Gilbert; Eric Pressley	4:43
11.	"Unfinished Sympathy"	Robert Del Naja; Daddy G; Shara Nelson; Jay Sharp; Andrew Vowles	4:30
12.	"Dancing in My Dreams"	Mark Cawley; Kye Fleming; Brenda Russell	6:45
Total length:			58:05

Japanese bonus track
No.	Title	Writer(s)	Length
13.	"Love Is a Beautiful Thing"	Seth Swirsky	3:45
Total length:			61:50

Special tour edition bonus disc
No.	Title	Writer(s)	Length
1.	"In Your Wildest Dreams" (with Barry White; single edit)	Chapman; Knight	3:48
2.	"Something Beautiful Remains" (Joe Urban remix edit)	Britten; Lyle	4:00
3.	"The Difference Between Us"	Nicholas Holland; Camus Mare Celli; Andrés Levin	4:32
4.	"River Deep – Mountain High" (live, Amsterdam 1996)	Phil Spector; Jeff Barry; Ellie Greenwich	3:59
5.	"We Don't Need Another Hero (Thunderdome)" (live, Amsterdam 1996)	Britten; Lyle	6:04
6.	"Private Dancer" (live, Amsterdam 1996)	Mark Knopfler	9:01
7.	"Steamy Windows" (live, Amsterdam 1996)	Tony Joe White	3:37
8.	"The Best" (live, Amsterdam 1996)	Chapman; Knight	7:13
9.	"On Silent Wings" (live, Amsterdam 1996)	Ralston; White	5:27

North American version
No.	Title	Writer(s)	Length
1.	"Missing You" (alternate mix)	Leonard; Sandford; Waite	4:40
2.	"In Your Wildest Dreams" (with Barry White)	Chapman; Knight	5:29
3.	"Whatever You Want" (alternate mix)	Baker; Dayne; Zarr	4:31
4.	"Do What You Do"	Britten; Lyle; Reeves	4:23
5.	"Thief of Hearts"	Friedman; Hattler; Krause; Rich	4:05
6.	"On Silent Wings" (featuring Sting)	Ralston; White	6:12
7.	"Something Beautiful Remains"	Britten; Lyle	4:20
8.	"Confidential"	Lowe; Tennant	4:39
9.	"The Difference Between Us"	Holland; Celli; Levin	4:32
10.	"All Kinds of People"	Crow; Gilbert; Presley	4:43
11.	"Unfinished Sympathy"	Del Naja; Marshall; Nelson; Sharp; Vowles	4:30
12.	"GoldenEye" (soundtrack version)	Bono; The Edge	4:46
13.	"Dancing in My Dreams"	Cawley; Fleming; Russell	6:45
14.	"Something Beautiful Remains" (Joe Urban remix edit; hidden track)	Britten; Lyle	5:10
Total length:			68:45

30th Anniversary Edition bonus disc

1. "In Your Wildest Dreams" (featuring Barry White) (Radio Edit)
2. "Do Something"
3. "Love Is a Beautiful Thing"
4. "The Difference Between Us"
5. "Something Special"
6. "Something Beautiful" Remains (Joe Urban Remix Edit)
7. "Goldeneye" (A/C Mix)
8. "Goldeneye" (Morales Club Mix)
9. "Whatever You Want" (The Massive Jungle Mix)
10. "Whatever You Want "(Tees Freeze Mix)

== Personnel ==
- Tina Turner – lead vocals
- Sting – vocals
- Barry White – vocals (U.S. edition)
- Antonio Banderas – vocals
- Sheryl Crow – background vocals
- Anne Dudley – orchestra arrangements
- John Altman – string arrangements
- Gavin Wright – orchestra leader
- C-n-A – guitar, keyboards
- Terry Britten – guitar, bass guitar, background vocals
- Trevor Rabin – guitar, background vocals
- Tim Pierce, J.J. Belle, Dominic Miller, David Rainger – guitar
- Chris "Snake" Davis, John Thirkell, Andy Hamilton, Steve Hamilton, Peter Thoms, Andy Bush – horns
- Charles Olins – piano
- Neil Tennant – keyboards, background vocals
- Chris Lowe, Lol Creme, Jamie Muhoberac, Toby Chapman, Garry Hughes, Richard Cottle – keyboards
- Reggie Hamilton, Andy Hess – bass guitar
- Keith LeBlanc, Graham Broad, Eric Anest, Richie Stevens, Mike Higham – drums
- Trevor Horn – background vocals
- Tessa Niles – background vocals
- Lisa Fischer – background vocals
- Miriam Stockley – background vocals
- Conner Reeves – background vocals
- The Durham Cathedral Choir – choir

=== Production ===
- Terry Britten – record producer, tracks 1 and 9
- Trevor Horn – producer, tracks 2 to 6, 10, 12
- Bono – executive producer, track 7
- The Edge – executive producer, track 7
- Nellee Hooper – producer, track 7
- Chris Porter – producer, track 8
- Pet Shop Boys (Chris Lowe and Neil Tennant) – producers, track 8
- Garry Hughes – producer, track 11
- Andres Levin and Camus Celli – producers on "The Difference Between Us" from an original production by Trevor Horn
- Tim Weidner – sound engineer
- Brian Tench – sound engineer
- Chris Porter – sound engineer

== Charts ==
=== Weekly charts ===
Weekly chart performance for Wildest Dreams
Chart (1996–1997)	Peak position
Australian Albums (ARIA)	14
Austrian Albums (Ö3 Austria) Special Tour Edition	2
Belgian Albums (Ultratop Flanders)	3
Belgian Albums (Ultratop Wallonia)	7
Canada Top Albums/CDs (RPM)	29
Danish Albums (Hitlisten)	4
Dutch Albums (Album Top 100)	4
European Albums (Music & Media)	2
Finnish Albums (Suomen virallinen lista)	3
French Albums (SNEP)	14
German Albums (Offizielle Top 100)	2
Hungarian Albums (MAHASZ)	10
Italian Albums (FIMI)	2
New Zealand Albums (RMNZ) Special Tour Edition	1
Norwegian Albums (VG-lista)	6
Portuguese Albums (AFP)	3
Scottish Albums (Official Charts)	5
Spanish Albums (AFYVE)	15
Swedish Albums (Sverigetopplistan)	5
Swiss Albums (Schweizer Hitparade)	1
UK Albums (Official Charts)	4
US Billboard 200	61
US Top R&B/Hip-Hop Albums (Billboard)	26
US Cash Box Top Pop Albums	58

=== Year-end charts ===
1996 year-end chart performance for Wildest Dreams
Chart (1996)	Position
Austrian Albums (Ö3 Austria)	9
Dutch Albums (Album Top 100)	20
European Albums (Music & Media)	12
French Albums (SNEP)	26
German Albums (Offizielle Top 100)	12
Norwegian Vår Period Albums (VG-lista)	17
Swedish Albums (Sverigetopplistan)	58
Swiss Albums (Schweizer Hitparade)	9
UK Albums (OCC)	27

1997 year-end chart performance for Wildest Dreams
Chart (1997)	Position
New Zealand Albums (RMNZ)	39

== Certifications and sales ==
Certifications and sales for Wildest Dreams
Region	Certification	Certified units/sales
Austria (IFPI Austria)	Platinum	50,000^{*}
Belgium (BRMA)	Platinum	50,000^{*}
Canada (Music Canada)	Gold	50,000^{^}
Finland (Musiikkituottajat)	Gold	32,622
France (SNEP)	2× Gold	200,000^{*}
Germany (BVMI)	Platinum	500,000^{^}
Netherlands (NVPI)	Platinum	100,000^{^}
New Zealand (RMNZ)	Platinum	15,000^{^}
Norway (IFPI Norway)	Gold	25,000^{*}
Poland (ZPAV)	Gold	50,000^{*}
Spain (Promusicae)	Gold	50,000^{^}
Sweden (GLF)	Gold	50,000^{^}
Switzerland (IFPI Switzerland)	Platinum	50,000^{^}
United Kingdom (BPI)	2× Platinum	600,000^{^}
United States	—	475,000
Summaries
Europe (IFPI)	2× Platinum	2,000,000^{*}
Worldwide	—	6,000,000
^{*} Sales figures based on certification alone.^{^} Shipments figures based on certification alone.

== Release history ==
Release history and formats for Wildest Dreams
Region	Date	Label	Format	Catalogue
United Kingdom and Europe	April 1, 1996	Parlophone	CD	724383768424
United States	September 3, 1996	Virgin	CD	
United Kingdom	November 1, 1996	Parlophone	2CD	724385377129
Worldwide (30th Anniversary Edition)	June 26, 2026	Parlophone	2CD	2685410615
