= When the Heartache Is Over =

1999 single by Tina Turner

Single by Tina Turner

from the album Twenty Four Seven
- Released: October 18, 1999
- Studio: DreamHouse (London, England)
- Genre: Dance-rock
- Length: 3:45
- Label: Virgin (US); Parlophone (worldwide)
- Songwriters: Graham Stack; John Reid
- Producers: Brian Rawling; Mark Taylor

Tina Turner singles chronology
"Cose della vita – Can't Stop Thinking of You" (1997)	"When the Heartache Is Over" (1999)	"Whatever You Need" (2000)

Music video
- "When the Heartache Is Over" on YouTube

"When the Heartache Is Over" is a song by American recording artist Tina Turner. Written by Graham Stack and John Reid for her tenth and final solo studio album, Twenty Four Seven (1999), it was released as the album's lead single on October 18, 1999. The song was a moderate hit in late 1999 and early 2000, reaching number 10 in the UK and the top 20 in several other European countries. The song is produced by British producers Brian Rawling and Mark Taylor.

== Release ==
It was a considerable hit both on the pop and dance charts, reaching the top 10 in Finland and the UK, and the top 20 in Denmark, Flanders, the Netherlands, Spain, Sweden, and Switzerland while peaking at number three on the Billboard Dance Club Play chart in the United States. The singles released include remixes of "When the Heartache Is Over" by among others the Metro team, 7th District Inc. and Hex Hector. Certain European CD singles also included two live recordings from Turner's 1996 Wildest Dreams Tour, "I Can't Stand the Rain" and "On Silent Wings".

== Critical reception ==
Larry Flick from Billboard wrote that the song was produced by the team that catapulted Cher back to fame via "Believe", "this number has similar energy, with a bright-eyed dance beat and production so tight and joyful that listeners will be pulled in by the first chorus and singing along by the last." He added, "Lyrically, Turner sings of the joy of liberation from a love gone bad—once the heartache has passed. It's a positive message that will bring in a new generation of pop listeners, while allowing adults to crack a smile and tap a toe to the worldwide return of one of contemporary music's greatest achievers and most-cherished performers." Can't Stop the Pop noted that the track "steps back to let Tina Turner do what she does best: cut loose and tear into it with her raspy rock vocals." They also complimented its "huge chorus", stating that the singer "never fails to wring every drop of emotion from the song." The Daily Vault's Mark Millan said that "her past is also relived", "which finds Turner lamenting: "Sometimes I look back in anger, thinking about all the pain / But I know that I'm stronger without you and that I'll never need you again"." Tom Lanham from Entertainment Weekly noted that the "undaunted diva hugs synth-pop corners the way a hotdog skier schusses the slalom, kicking up soul-stirring powder at every turn. Behind her time-tested pipes is a grand chorus, pushing this winner across the finish line."

American newspaper Herald-Journal picked "When The Heartache Is Over" as one of the "highlights" of the Twenty Four Seven album, adding that it "is reminiscent of Cher's "Believe", both musically and lyrically. A hit throughout Europe, "Heartache" is posed to repeat the process in the U.S." Gustavo Rivas from The Ithacan said that the producers "do a great job at adding her voice to a mixture of disco and rock rhythms." He noted that despite the fact that the lyrics of the song "are like those of Believe, where the theme was reminiscent of Gloria Gaynor's I Will Survive, Tina's unique voice and attitude allow the song to stand strong." Nathalie Nichols from Los Angeles Times described it as a "pumping" "I-will-go-on inspirational anthem". Pop Rescue said that "musically and structurally, it’s basically the same track [as "Believe"] with its layers of synths swirling and bubbling around in the background. Tina sounds great here though, and the chorus gives her plenty of space to show off that vocal power we know she somehow manages to muster." A reviewer from Press-Telegram wrote that "the mighty Tina Turner returns with a single that is so scintillating, so accessible to today's pop leanings". Jon Caramanica from Salon called it a "sleek Europop affair".

== Music video ==
The accompanying music video for the song, which was filmed by British director Paul Boyd, features Turner dancing on a giant "T" with other dancers around her on the ground. The video was choreographed by Tina Landon. The background is black with a big screen that has flashing colours on it.

== Track listings and formats ==
- European CD single
1. "When the Heartache Is Over" (album version) – 3:45
2. "On Silent Wings" (live in Amsterdam) – 5:25
- European cassette single
1. "When the Heartache Is Over" (album version) – 3:45
2. "When the Heartache Is Over" (Metro mix) – 5:44
- European CD maxi single
1. "When the Heartache Is Over" (album version) – 3:45
2. "I Can't Stand the Rain" (live in Amsterdam) – 3:33
3. "On Silent Wings" (live in Amsterdam) – 5:25
- European CD maxi and 12-inch single
1. "When the Heartache Is Over" (album version) – 3:45
2. "When the Heartache Is Over" (Metro mix) – 5:44
3. "When the Heartache Is Over" (7th District club mix) – 5:10
- US 12-inch single
1. "When the Heartache Is Over" (Hex Hector 12-inch vocal mix) – 8:45
2. "When the Heartache Is Over" (Hex Hector 7-inch vocal mix) – 3:30
3. "When the Heartache Is Over" (Hex Hector 12-inch instrumental) – 8:45
4. "When the Heartache Is Over" (Metro mix) – 5:45
5. "When the Heartache Is Over" (7th District club mix) – 5:11
6. "When the Heartache Is Over" (Hex Hector acapella) – 4:02
7. "When the Heartache Is Over" (LP version) – 3:46

== Charts ==
=== Weekly charts ===
Weekly chart performance for "When the Heartache Is Over"
Chart (1999–2000)	Peak position
Austria (Ö3 Austria Top 40)	22
Belgium (Ultratop 50 Flanders)	17
Belgium (Ultratop 50 Wallonia)	33
Canada Top Singles (RPM)	27
Canada Adult Contemporary (RPM)	3
Croatia International Airplay (HRT)	8
Denmark (IFPI)	19
Europe (Eurochart Hot 100)	16
Finland (Suomen virallinen lista)	3
France (SNEP)	49
Germany (GfK)	23
Iceland (Íslenski Listinn Topp 40)	25
Italy (Musica e dischi)	19
Italy Airplay (Music & Media)	4
Netherlands (Dutch Top 40)	18
Netherlands (Single Top 100)	23
Scottish Singles Sales (Official Charts)	12
Spain (Promusicae)	11
Sweden (Sverigetopplistan)	16
Switzerland (Schweizer Hitparade)	17
UK Singles (Official Charts)	10
US Adult Contemporary (Billboard)	23
US Adult Pop Airplay (Billboard)	40
US Dance Club Songs (Billboard)	3
US Dance Singles Sales (Billboard)	44

=== Year-end charts ===
1999 year-end chart performance for "When the Heartache Is Over"
Chart (1999)	Position
Netherlands (Dutch Top 40)	124
UK Singles (OCC)	170

2000 year-end chart performance for "When the Heartache Is Over"
Chart (2000)	Position
US Adult Contemporary (Billboard)	49
US Dance Club Play (Billboard)	47

== Release history ==
Release history and formats for "When the Heartache Is Over"
Region	Date	Format(s)	Label(s)	Ref(s).
United Kingdom	October 18, 1999	CD; cassette	Parlophone	
United States	December 6, 1999	Adult contemporary; hot adult contemporary radio	Virgin	
United States	December 7, 1999	Contemporary hit radio	Virgin	
