= Twenty Four Seven (Tina Turner album) =

- Regular edition cover

Studio album by Tina Turner
- Released: October 28, 1999
- Studios: CTS Studios (London, England); DreamHouse Studios (London, England); Olympic Studios (London, England); Sarm West (London, England); Powerplay, (Zurich, Switzerland); The Arc
- Length: 47:09
- Label: Parlophone
- Producers: Absolute; Terry Britten; Johnny Douglas; Brian Rawling; Mark Taylor

Tina Turner chronology
Wildest Dreams (1996)	Twenty Four Seven (1999)	All the Best (2004)

Alternative cover
- Limited edition cover art

Singles from Twenty Four Seven
- 1. "When the Heartache Is Over" Released: September 6, 1999; 2. "Whatever You Need" Released: February 5, 2000; 3. "Don't Leave Me This Way" Released: February 14, 2000

Twenty Four Seven is the ninth and final solo studio album by singer Tina Turner. First released by Parlophone in Europe in October 1999, it received a North American release through Virgin Records in February 2000. As with her previous album Wildest Dreams (1996), Turner worked with a small team of British producers on the album, including Mark Taylor, Brian Rawling, Johnny Douglas, Terry Britten and production team Absolute. Singer Bryan Adams appears on both the title track and "Without You".

The album received a mixed reception from music critics, many of whom praised Turner's vocal performance but found the material too formulaic. A commercial success, it topped the albums charts in Switzerland and reached the top ten on most of the charts it appeared on. In the United States, Twenty Four Seven scored Turner her biggest first week sales by then. Lead single "When the Heartache Is Over" became a top-ten dance hit, while the Twenty Four Seven Tour emerged as the highest-grossing tour of 2000. Twenty Four Seven was Turner's last full-length studio album before her death in 2023.

== Promotion ==
Several singles were released in support of the album. Twenty Four Seven was preceded by lead single "When the Heartache Is Over", released in October 1999. Written by Graham Stack and John Reid, the dance pop song became a considerable hit both on the pop and dance charts, reaching the top ten in Finland and the United Kingdom, as well as the top twenty in Flemish Belgium, Denmark, the Netherlands, Spain, Sweden, and Switzerland. It also peaked at number three on the US Billboard Hot Dance Club Songs, becoming Turner's biggest hit on that chart since 1984's "Let's Stay Together". In early 2000, Turner also performed the song in an episode of the hit comedy-drama series Ally McBeal in which the title character (played by Calista Flockhart) won the chance to be one of her backing dancers for the performance (episode S03E14 "The Oddball Parade").

Follow-up "Whatever You Need", written by Russ Courtenay and Harriet Roberts and released in January 2000, was less successful but peaked at number seven on the Czech Singles Chart while also reaching the top twenty in Finland and the Netherlands. "Don't Leave Me This Way", a cover version of English entertainer Malandra Burrows same-titled 1998 recording, served as the album's second single in German-speaking Europe. Released in February 2000, the ballad reached number 16 in the Czech Republic and entered the lower half on the German Singles Chart.

Billed as her final outing, Turner embarked on the Twenty Four Seven Tour from March 23 to December 6, 2000. The highest-grossing tour of 2000, it grossed over $120 million. The same year, Twenty Four Seven was released as a limited-edition special pack with a bonus disc including live recordings from Turner's 60th birthday celebration in London in November 1999, as well as the music videos for "When the Heartache Is Over" and "Whatever You Need".

== Critical reception ==
Professional ratings
Review scores
Source	Rating
AllMusic	3/5 stars
MTV Asia	8/10
PopMatters	7/10
Rolling Stone	2.5/5 stars

Twenty Four Seven received mixed reviews. AllMusic editor Mark Morgenstein found that "Tina still puts Mariah Carey and Celine Dion to shame. But unfortunately, on Twenty Four Seven, the famous Turner passion is often submerged in glossy production that virtually defines "adult contemporary." In some transcendent moments, Tina reminds us of the woman who sang "River Deep, Mountain High" [...] As Tina sings in "Absolutely Nothing's Changed," she's lived to fight another day, and that's proof she ain't been broken." Rolling Stone's Anthony DeCurtis wrote that "at sixty, Turner still sounds incredible; she's lost remarkably little of her range and none of her power. She sweeps through the eleven generic tracks on this album with the force of a tornado whipping through a trailer park [...] Twenty Four Seven is the theme-park version of [a] masterful performer – evocative of the real thing but ultimately harmless, which is about the last thing Tina Turner should be."

Billboard editor Michael Paoletta called the album a "sterling collection that deftly trecks across a beat-savy terrain". Advocate critic Steve Gdula noted that while Turner "may have dropped her last name on the CD cover, she certainly hasn't lost anything else [...] Turner shows she's still as tough as nails in body, mind, and spirit. And most definitely in voice." Jason Hannaham, writing for Out, found that although the "majority of tracks squander Tina's prodigious talent, Twenty Four Seven does contain occasional moments of inspiration." He ranked "Without You" and the album's title song among its highlights. Similarly, Dave McKenna from The Washington Post called the album "a fairly formulaic release that only occasionally hints at Turner's former powers". The Baltimore Sun wrote that "Turner gives it her all, but Twenty Four Seven is simply not a great album."

== Commercial performance ==
Twenty Four Seven was first released in Europe in October 1999. As with her previous album, it debuted atop the album chart in Switzerland, Turner's then-new home country, leading to a Platinum certification by the International Federation of the Phonographic Industry (IFPI) of Switzerland. Elsewhere, it reached the top five in Austria, Germany, and Norway, and the top ten in Belgium, Denmark, Finland, Sweden, and the United Kingdom. It scored its biggest-sales in Germany where it was certifield triple Gold by the Bundesverband Musikindustrie (BVMI) in 2000 for shipments in excess of 450,000 units. Prior to its North American release, the album had accumulated sales of two million copies.

In the United States, Twenty Four Seven debuted and peaked at number 21 on the Billboard 200 in the week of February 19, 2000. With first week sales of 60,000 units, it scored Turner her biggest first week sales up to then. The album was certified Gold by the Recording Industry Association of America (RIAA) on March 7, 2000, and sold 300,000 copies within its first eight weeks of release. By January 2014, Twenty Four Seven had sold 517,000, according to Nielsen SoundScan. In Canada, the album reached number nine on RPM's Top Albums/CDs chart, becoming Turner's highest-charting album since Break Every Rule (1986).

== Track listing ==
Twenty Four Seven track listing
No.	Title	Writer(s)	Producer(s)	Length
1.	"Whatever You Need"	Harriet Roberts; Russell Courtenay	Johnny Douglas	4:49
2.	"All the Woman"	Paul Wilson; Andy Watkins; Tracy Ackerman	Absolute; Douglas^{[a]}	4:03
3.	"When the Heartache Is Over"	Graham Stack; John Reid	Brian Rawling; Mark Taylor	3:44
4.	"Absolutely Nothing's Changed"	Terry Britten; John O'Kane	Britten	3:43
5.	"Talk to My Heart"	Douglas; Graham Lyle	Douglas	5:08
6.	"Don't Leave Me This Way"	Paul Barry; Taylor; Rawling	Rawling; Taylor	4:19
7.	"Go Ahead"	James House; Anthony Little	Douglas	4:20
8.	"Without You"	Wilson; Watkins; Shernette May	Absolute	4:06
9.	"Falling"	Tim Fraser; Sol Connell	Britten	4:21
10.	"I Will Be There"	Barry Gibb; Robin Gibb; Maurice Gibb	Absolute; Douglas^{[b]}	4:37
11.	"Twenty Four Seven"	Britten; Charlie Dore	Britten	3:47

Limited edition bonus disc
No.	Title	Writer(s)	Length
1.	"Twenty Four Seven" (live, London 1999)	Britten; Dore	3:56
2.	"River Deep – Mountain High" (live, London 1999)	Phil Spector; Jeff Barry; Ellie Greenwich	4:00
3.	"When the Heartache Is Over" (live, London 1999)	Stack; Reid	3:48
4.	"Whatever You Need" (live, London 1999)	Roberts; Courtenay	4:44
5.	"Don't Leave Me This Way" (live, London 1999)	Barry; Taylor; Rawling	4:23
6.	"Talk to My Heart" (live, London 1999)	Douglas, Lyle	5:03
7.	"Hold On, I'm Coming" (live, London 1999)	Isaac Hayes; David Porter	3:01
8.	"All the Woman" (live, London 1999)	Wilson; Watkins; Ackerman	4:01
9.	"When the Heartache Is Over" (music video)
10.	"Whatever You Need" (music video)

=== Notes ===
- ^{^[a]} signifies an additional producer
- ^{^[b]} signifies a co-producer

== Personnel and credits ==
Credits are taken from the album's liner notes.

Musicians

- Tina Turner – lead vocals
- Tracy Ackerman, Bryan Adams, Terry Britten – backing vocals
- Pete Lincoln – acoustic guitar
- Pino Palladino – bass guitar
- Terry Britten, Phil Hudson, Milton McDonald, Phil Palmer, Adam Phillips, Alan Ross – guitar
- Peter Hope-Evans – harmonica
- Duncan Mackay, Mike Stevens, Nichol Thompson – horns
- Absolute, Marcus Brown, Dave Clews, Johnny Douglas, Graham Stack, Mark Taylor – other instrumentation
- Mark Taylor – keyboards
- Bruno Bridges – programming
- The London Musicians Orchestra – strings
- Steve Sidwell – trumpet

Technical and production

- Record producers – Absolute, Terry Britten, Johnny Douglas, Brian Rawling, Mark Taylor
- Engineering – Marc Lane, Ren Swan, Paul Wright – sound engineer
- Mastering engineer – Doug Sax

== Charts ==
=== Weekly charts ===
Weekly chart performance for Twenty Four Seven
Chart (1999–2000)	Peak position
Austrian Albums (Ö3 Austria)	5
Belgian Albums (Ultratop Flanders)	9
Belgian Albums (Ultratop Wallonia)	16
Canada Top Albums/CDs (RPM)	9
Canadian R&B Albums (Nielsen SoundScan)	2
Danish Albums (Hitlisten)	9
Dutch Albums (Album Top 100)	24
European Albums (Music & Media)	3
Finnish Albums (Suomen virallinen lista)	6
French Albums (SNEP)	23
German Albums (Offizielle Top 100)	3
Hungarian Albums (MAHASZ)	22
Italian Albums (FIMI)	13
Norwegian Albums (VG-lista)	5
Scottish Albums (Official Charts)	27
Spanish Albums (AFYVE)	18
Swedish Albums (Sverigetopplistan)	6
Swiss Albums (Schweizer Hitparade)	1
UK Albums (Official Charts)	9
US Billboard 200	21
US Top R&B/Hip-Hop Albums (Billboard)	29

=== Year-end charts ===
1999 year-end chart performance for Twenty Four Seven
Chart (1999)	Position
Belgian Albums (Ultratop Flanders)	53
Belgian Albums (Ultratop Wallonia)	90
European Albums (Music & Media)	52
German Albums (Offizielle Top 100)	70
Swedish Albums (Sverigetopplistan)	64
Swiss Albums (Schweizer Hitparade)	50
UK Albums (OCC)	49

2000 year-end chart performance for Twenty Four Seven
Chart (2000)	Position
Canadian Albums (Nielsen SoundScan)	160
Danish Albums (Hitlisten)	94
Finnish International Albums (Suomen virallinen lista)	171
German Albums (Offizielle Top 100)	79
Swiss Albums (Schweizer Hitparade)	53

== Certifications and sales ==
Certifications and sales for Twenty Four Seven
Region	Certification	Certified units/sales
Austria (IFPI Austria)	Gold	25,000^{*}
Belgium (BRMA)	Gold	25,000^{*}
Canada (Music Canada)	Gold	50,000^{^}
Denmark	—	14,228
Finland	—	12,047
France (SNEP)	Gold	100,000^{*}
Germany (BVMI)	3× Gold	450,000^{^}
Norway (IFPI Norway)	Platinum	50,000^{*}
Spain (Promusicae)	Gold	50,000^{^}
Sweden (GLF)	Platinum	80,000^{^}
Switzerland (IFPI Switzerland)	Platinum	50,000^{^}
United Kingdom (BPI)	Platinum	300,000^{^}
United States (RIAA)	Gold	517,000
Summaries
Europe (IFPI)	Platinum	1,000,000^{*}
Worldwide	—	3,000,000
^{*} Sales figures based on certification alone.^{^} Shipments figures based on certification alone.

== Release history ==
Release dates and formats for Twenty Four Seven
Region	Date	Format	Label	Catalogue
Germany	October 28, 1999	CD	Parlophone	
United Kingdom	November 1, 1999	CD	Parlophone	724352318025
United States	February 1, 2000	CD	Virgin	
United Kingdom	July 10, 2000	2-CD	Parlophone	724352721306
