= On Silent Wings =

1996 single by Tina Turner

Single by Tina Turner featuring Sting

from the album Wildest Dreams
- B-side: "Do Something"
- Released: May 27, 1996
- Length: 4:22
- Label: Virgin, Parlophone
- Songwriters: Tony Joe White, James Ralston
- Producer: Trevor Horn

Tina Turner singles chronology
"Whatever You Want" (1996)	"On Silent Wings" (1996)	"Missing You" (1996)

Sting singles chronology
"I'm So Happy I Can't Stop Crying" (1996)	"On Silent Wings" (1997)	"I'm So Happy I Can't Stop Crying (with Toby Keith)" (1997)

Music video
- "On Silent Wings" on YouTube

"On Silent Wings" is a song by American singer-songwriter Tina Turner with guest vocals from English musician Sting. Released in May 1996, by Virgin and Parlophone, in support of Turner's ninth album, Wildest Dreams (1996), the single performed well on the US and Canadian adult contemporary charts, peaking at numbers 24 and 13, respectively. The dance version of "On Silent Wings", remixed by Soul Solution, charted at number 47 on the US Billboard Dance Club Play chart. Like much of Turner's later work, "On Silent Wings" experience greater success in the United Kingdom, peaking at number 13 on the UK Singles Chart.

The single included the country-flavoured single edit with additional guitar overdubs, later appearing on the 2004 compilation All the Best, as well as a second alternative version of the track. Some formats also featured the non-album track "Do Something", written by Holly Knight and Mike Chapman and produced by Trevor Horn.

== Critical reception ==
Larry Flick from Billboard magazine wrote, "On the eve of La Tina's first stateside concert tour in eons, Virgin plucks one of the strongest and more radio-friendly tunes from the diva's gorgeous (and sadly underappreciated) current disc, Wildest Dreams. Her worldly perspective adds depth to the lyrics of this melancholy rock ballad, which also shows producer Trevor Horn tempering his signature melodramatic keyboard sound with subtle acoustic strumming that never distracts the ear from Turner. Additional programming incentive comes from a laid-back cameo by Sting, though this lovely single would merit the ardent attention of pop, triple-A, and even mainstream rock radio without such stunt casting."

== Music video ==
The accompanying music video released to support the single featured Turner standing on the edge of Table Mountain in Cape Town, South Africa in a white dress interspersed with live performance clips. The video showcases the concert held at Newlands Cricket Stadium, Noordehoek Beach, Bo-Kaap and Table Mountain, the eight wonder of the world.

== Track listings ==
- UK CD1 and cassette single
1. "On Silent Wings" (single edit)
2. "Private Dancer"
3. "The Best"
4. "I Don't Wanna Lose You"
- UK CD2
1. "On Silent Wings" (single edit)
2. "Whatever You Want"
3. "Do Something"
4. "On Silent Wings" (alternative version)
- European CD single
1. "On Silent Wings" (single edit)
2. "Do Something"
- Australian CD single
1. "On Silent Wings" (single edit)
2. "Private Dancer"
3. "Do Something"
4. "I Don't Wanna Lose You"

== Charts ==
=== Weekly charts ===
Chart (1996–1997)	Peak position
Austria (Ö3 Austria Top 40)	30
Belgium (Ultratop 50 Flanders)	36
Canada Adult Contemporary (RPM)	13
Europe (Eurochart Hot 100)	45
Germany (GfK)	55
Hungary (Mahasz)	7
Iceland (Íslenski Listinn Topp 40)	27
Israel (Israeli Singles Chart)	13
Netherlands (Dutch Top 40 Tipparade)	5
Netherlands (Single Top 100)	37
Scottish Singles Sales (Official Charts)	10
UK Singles (Official Charts)	13
US Adult Contemporary (Billboard)	24
US Dance Club Songs (Billboard)	47

=== Year-end charts ===
Chart (1997)	Position
Canada Adult Contemporary (RPM)	88
