= GoldenEye (song) =

Theme from the 1995 James Bond film GoldenEye

Single by Tina Turner

from the album GoldenEye: Original Motion Picture Soundtrack from the United Artists film and Wildest Dreams
- Released: November 6, 1995
- Recorded: September 1995
- Studio: Olympic Sound (London, UK)
- Genre: Electronica
- Length: 4:41
- Label: Virgin (US); Parlophone (worldwide)
- Songwriters: Bono; the Edge
- Producer: Nellee Hooper

Tina Turner singles chronology
"Proud Mary" (1993)	"GoldenEye" (1995)	"Whatever You Want" (1996)

James Bond theme singles chronology
"Licence to Kill" (1989)	"GoldenEye" (1995)	"Tomorrow Never Dies" (1997)

Music video
- "GoldenEye" on YouTube

"GoldenEye" is a song written by Irish musicians Bono and the Edge and performed by American singer Tina Turner. It served as the theme for the 1995 James Bond film GoldenEye and was included on its accompanying soundtrack album as well as Turner's 1996 album Wildest Dreams. Produced by Nellee Hooper, it was released as a single on November 6, 1995. Virgin Records issued the song in the United States while Parlophone issued it worldwide.

"GoldenEye" was a chart hit in Europe. It sold over 300,000 units in Germany, topped the Hungarian Singles Chart and reached the top five in Austria, Finland, France, Italy and Switzerland, as well as number 10 on the UK Singles Chart. "GoldenEye" was less successful outside Europe, reaching number 43 in Canada, number 63 in Australia, and number two on the US Billboard Bubbling Under Hot 100. The music video for the song was directed by Jake Scott.

== Background and release ==
"GoldenEye"
A 28-second sample of "GoldenEye". The song has been compared to previous James Bond themes, with Turner's voice specifically compared to that of Shirley Bassey

Depeche Mode was initially approached in 1994 to sing the main theme song for GoldenEye, but were coming to the end of their Devotional Tour and could not meet the schedule. Instead, the producers got Tina Turner to agree to do the song. After being informed of Turner's involvement, Bono and the Edge of Irish rock band U2 were next to join, and agreed to write the song. The track was produced and mixed by British producer/remixer/composer Nellee Hooper, best known for his work with Massive Attack, Madonna, U2, and Björk. The track reached number ten on the UK Singles Chart and became a top-five hit in several European countries.

"GoldenEye" was first released on the original motion picture soundtrack and the following year it was included on Turner's album Wildest Dreams. The song has been covered by Nicole Scherzinger for the 2010 remake of the GoldenEye 007 video game.

== Critical reception ==
Larry Flick from Billboard magazine praised "GoldenEye" as a "gloriously over-the-top James Bond theme" and a "tingly, feline performance" by Turner. He found that producer Nellee Hooper "captures the essence of the movie, wrapping the track in sweeping strings and horns that are fondly reminiscent" of the 1964 movie Goldfinger, and added that U2's Bono and the Edge "get in on the fun, writing a tune that's fraught with cryptic lyrical twists and romantic intrigue." James Masterton for Dotmusic wrote that "like most Bond themes it tends towards the sweeping style of the early John Barry efforts yet still manages to retain its own identity." Nisid Hajari from Entertainment Weekly stated that the James Bond myth "certainly allows for the trinity of Sex, Danger, and Elegance to verge on melodrama." He noted the song's "self-conscious vocals and maudlin horns and strings", that "blithely crosses the line". A reviewer from Liverpool Echo felt that Turner "manages to sound like Shirley Bassey".

David Cook from The Michigan Daily wrote that "it's amazing how similar this song sounds to other opening songs from previous James Bond movies — there must be some magic formula to making all of the sound so Bondlike." Pan-European magazine Music & Media named it a "perfect candidate" for the soundtrack of 007's "latest adventure", stating that Turner "and her raw R&B power easily fit in the Shirley Bassey tradition." They also noted that the composers "stayed close to the traditional James Bond sound". Music Week gave the song a top score with five out of five, writing that the singer's voice "soars above a swirling orchestra in this powerful single with a classic Bond feel." Jeff Farance from The News-Journal, while reviewing the movie, felt that the title sequence is "pure Bond, with Tina Turner belting out the title song in the grand tradition of magnificent music for 007." Mark Sutherland from NME said that "Tina Turner turns in the traditional Shirley Bassey-esque theme with a performance so dramatic that there's no way anything on screen will ever be able to match it." Gill Whyte from Smash Hits gave "GoldenEye" four out of five, writing, "Lordy, this could have all gone so horribly wrong — but it didn't! Instead it's Bondastically brilliant. it's got the lot: big old sexy vocals, cool jazzy bits and bewitching lyrics. The name's Surprised, Pleasantly Surprised." More recently, on an April 2026 episode of the podcast This Had Oscar Buzz, host Chris Feil offered the opinion that "GoldenEye" is "the greatest Bond song ever" as well as "the sexiest Bond song."

== Music video ==
The accompanying music video for "GoldenEye" was directed by English film director Jake Scott and edited by David D. Williams. It was produced by Caroline True and Ellen Jacobson-Clarke, and made its debut at the end of October 1995. The video features Turner, wearing a long white strapless dress, either sitting on a chair or walking on a catwalk in front of a large golden eye. In between there are several scenes from the movie. The video also features Sudanese model Alek Wek.

== Charts ==
=== Weekly charts ===
Chart (1995–1996)	Peak position
Australia (ARIA)	63
Austria (Ö3 Austria Top 40)	5
Belgium (Ultratop 50 Flanders)	9
Belgium (Ultratop 50 Wallonia)	6
Brazil (UPI)	5
Canada Top Singles (RPM)	43
Canada Adult Contemporary (RPM)	2
Denmark (IFPI)	9
Europe (Eurochart Hot 100)	3
Europe (European Hit Radio)	1
Finland (Suomen virallinen lista)	3
France (SNEP)	3
Germany (GfK)	8
Hungary (Mahasz)	1
Iceland (Íslenski Listinn Topp 40)	14
Ireland (IRMA)	15
Israel (Israeli Singles Chart)	9
Italy (Musica e dischi)	5
Italy Airplay (Music & Media)	1
Netherlands (Dutch Top 40)	14
Netherlands (Single Top 100)	17
Norway (VG-lista)	9
Poland Airplay (Music & Media)	1
Scottish Singles Sales (Official Charts)	13
Sweden (Sverigetopplistan)	6
Switzerland (Schweizer Hitparade)	3
UK Singles (Official Charts)	10
UK Hip Hop/R&B (Official Charts)	2
UK Club Chart (Music Week)	30
US Bubbling Under Hot 100 (Billboard)	2
US Dance Club Songs (Billboard)	22
US Hot R&B/Hip-Hop Songs (Billboard)	89

=== Year-end charts ===
Chart (1995)	Position
Belgium (Ultratop 50 Wallonia)	98
Latvia (Latvijas Top 50)	67
Netherlands (Dutch Top 40)	120
Norway Christmas Period (VG-lista)	14
Sweden (Topplistan)	54

Chart (1996)	Position
Belgium (Ultratop 50 Flanders)	86
Belgium (Ultratop 50 Wallonia)	52
Canada Adult Contemporary (RPM)	58
Europe (Eurochart Hot 100)	25
France (SNEP)	66
Germany (Media Control)	73
Netherlands (Dutch Top 40)	155
Switzerland (Schweizer Hitparade)	36

== Certifications and sales ==
Region	Certification	Certified units/sales
France (SNEP)	Silver	125,000^{*}
Germany (BVMI)	Gold	300,000
Switzerland (IFPI Switzerland)	Gold	25,000^{^}
United Kingdom (BPI)	Silver	200,000^{‡}
^{*} Sales figures based on certification alone.^{^} Shipments figures based on certification alone.^{‡} Sales+streaming figures based on certification alone.

== Release history ==
Region	Date	Format(s)	Label(s)	Ref.
United States	October 31, 1995	Contemporary hit radio	Virgin	
United Kingdom	November 6, 1995	12-inch vinyl; CD; cassette	Parlophone	
Australia	November 13, 1995	CD	Parlophone	
Japan	December 6, 1995	Mini-CD	Virgin	

== Alternate rejected theme song ==
Like many Bond themes before it, Tina Turner's version was not the only recorded song for the film. Swedish pop band Ace of Base also recorded a song that was optioned to the studio. Ace of Base's "The GoldenEye" was later reworked into "The Juvenile", which appeared on their Da Capo album in 2002.

== Samples and covers ==
- In 1999, French rapper Kohndo has sampled parts of the instrumentals in his song "Survivre" from his EP Prélude à l’odyssée.
- In 2008, Lil Mass, another French rapper, sampled it in the song "Beatdown".
- The song appeared in an episode of MTV series Human Giant and again in the 2010 film Beatdown.
- American singer Nicole Scherzinger, lead singer of pop group the Pussycat Dolls, covered the single for the 2010 remake of the video game GoldenEye 007. The song plays during the game's introduction.
- Finnish alternative rock band End of You covered the song for their 2008 album Mimesis.
- Prominent DJ David Morales has performed a club remix of the song, while record producer Dave Hall has provided a more urban flavour on his remix, both versions were included on the European four-track CD single.

== See also ==
- James Bond music
- Outline of James Bond
