= Whatever You Need (Tina Turner song) =

2000 single by Tina Turner

Single by Tina Turner

from the album Twenty Four Seven
- Released: January 31, 2000
- Studio: Sarm West Studios (London, England)
- Length: 4:44 (album version); 4:20 (radio edit)
- Label: Parlophone; Virgin
- Songwriters: Harriet Roberts; Russell Courtenay
- Producer: Johnny Douglas

Tina Turner singles chronology
"When the Heartache Is Over" (1999)	"Whatever You Need" (2000)	"Don't Leave Me This Way" (2000)

Music video
- "Whatever You Need" on YouTube

"Whatever You Need" is a song by American recording artist Tina Turner. It was written by Russ Courtenay and Harriet Roberts, produced by Johnny Douglas, and released in January 2000 as the second single from Turner's tenth and final solo album, Twenty Four Seven (1999). The song reached number 11 in Finland and number 27 on the UK Singles Chart. The CD singles include live recordings of some of Turner's hits from her 60th birthday celebration in London in November 1999, including "The Best", "River Deep - Mountain High", "What's Love Got to Do with It" and "Steamy Windows", later released on the DVD Celebrate! - 60th Birthday Special.

== Music video ==
The accompanying music video for "Whatever You Need", directed by Jake Nava, features Turner walking through a tunnel in a leather jacket and jeans. She then sits on some steps singing and some teenagers stop what they are doing and sit with her, singing along.

== Track listings ==
- European CD single
1. "Whatever You Need"
2. "River Deep – Mountain High" (Recorded Live in London '99)
- European cassette single
1. "Whatever You Need" – 4:48
2. "The Best" (Recorded Live in London '99) – 5:21
3. "River Deep – Mountain High" (Recorded Live in London '99) – 4:13
- European CD maxi single
1. "Whatever You Need" – 4:48
2. "The Best" (Recorded Live in London '99) – 5:21
3. "River Deep – Mountain High" (Recorded Live in London '99) – 4:13
4. "Whatever You Need" (Enhanced Video) – 4:48
- European CD maxi single
1. "Whatever You Need" (Recorded Live in London '99) – 4:56
2. "What's Love Got to Do with It" (Recorded Live in London '99) – 3:43
3. "Steamy Windows" (Recorded Live in London '99) – 3:17

== Charts ==
Chart (2000)	Peak position
Belgium (Ultratip Bubbling Under Flanders)	13
Canada Adult Contemporary (RPM)	53
Czech Republic (IFPI)	7
Finland (Suomen virallinen lista)	11
Germany (GfK)	82
Netherlands (Dutch Top 40 Tipparade)	20
Netherlands (Single Top 100)	72
Scottish Singles Sales (Official Charts)	22
UK Singles (Official Charts)	27

== Release history ==
Region	Date	Format(s)	Label(s)	Ref.
United Kingdom	January 31, 2000	CD; cassette	Parlophone	
United States	April 10, 2000	Adult contemporary; hot adult contemporary radio	Virgin	
