= Missing You (John Waite song) =

1984 single by John Waite

Single by John Waite

from the album No Brakes
- B-side: "For Your Love"
- Released: June 1984
- Genre: Soft rock; pop rock; white soul
- Length: 4:30 (album version); 3:56 (single version)
- Label: EMI America
- Songwriters: John Waite; Mark Leonard; Charles Sandford
- Producers: John Waite; David Thoener; Gary Gersh

John Waite singles chronology
"Going to the Top" (1982)	"Missing You" (1984)	"Tears" (1984)

Music video
- "Missing You" on YouTube

"Missing You" is a song co-written and recorded by English musician John Waite. It was released in June 1984 as the lead single from his second album, No Brakes (1984). It reached number one on the US Billboard Album Rock Tracks chart and on the Billboard Hot 100, as well as number 9 on the UK Singles Chart. The song was nominated for the 1985 Grammy Award for Best Pop Vocal Performance Male.

Waite re-recorded the song with country/bluegrass artist Alison Krauss which appeared on her album A Hundred Miles or More: A Collection, and released it to country music radio in 2007. The re-recording peaked at number 34 on the Hot Country Songs chart. Waite's original recording has been featured in the films Selena (1997), Warm Bodies (2013) and 22 Jump Street (2014).

== Composition and lyrics ==
The song is a soft rock, pop rock, and white soul track. It is performed in the key of G♭ major with a tempo of 104 beats per minute in common time. Waite's vocals span from G♭_{3} to C♭_{5} in the song.

In the verses/bridge, the singer describes how much he misses his ex-lover, while in the chorus, he lies to himself and vehemently denies missing them. The opening line "Every time I think of you" is the title of a song by Waite's group the Babys.

== Background ==
Waite's record label was convinced they had enough songs for the No Brakes album, but he felt it lacked a hit single. He went to a songwriter's house in LA, who showed him a guitar melody on a cassette tape. Waite listened to the melody once through, and the second time, improvised the entire first verse, 'B' section, and "missing you" section without stopping. Waite said the song was about three women in his life: he was getting divorced, and he was thinking of an old love interest from when he first moved to New York City as well as a current love interest. He said, "I was singing about New York, and distance, the caving in of my marriage, and the options that I had. It was bittersweet – it was about the end of my marriage and the beginning of something new. Although, when I was singing 'I ain't missing you', it was denial too." He had to convince the record label to spend an extra $5,000 to record this one last song.

The song was later mentioned by Sheila Weller as describing O. J. Simpson's obsession with Nicole Brown Simpson and was the inspiration for the title of Weller's book Raging Heart.

== Music video ==
The accompanying music video for "Missing You" was written, directed and produced by Kort Falkenberg III and was filmed in Los Angeles in 1984.

To start the clip, John Waite is sitting in a chair, and after seeing a picture of a woman (played by actress Elizabeth Reiko Kubota) with whom he is still in love, he, frustrated, slaps the lamp above him causing it to swing back and forth and begins to sing the song. When he opens his bedroom door, a woman playfully jumps into his arms and they embrace falling back onto the bed. Later, Waite watches through a crack in the door as the woman angrily throws her clothes into her suitcase. She pushes through the door to leave and she storms past him. He sadly remembers being at one of her photo shoots.

Waite later tries to call her from a phone booth, but when the woman finally picks up the phone, her only connection is to a dangling phone in an empty phone booth: Waite is gone. He laments "I ain't missin' you at all" as he walks down the street only to see a picture of the woman on a newspaper. He goes into a bar. There, an older woman tries to flirt with him, but for sheer sorrow he shows he is not interested. He goes home again still pining for the woman. He tries to call her but his anger and frustration gets the better of him and he smashes the phone into pieces. When she finally comes to his door and knocks, he doesn't answer, as he doesn't hear her knock over the music playing on his earphones. She leans against the door gently touching it and, with a deep breath, she turns and leaves as tears flow down her face.

== Personnel ==
- John Waite – lead and backing vocals
- Mark Leonard - keyboards
- Gary Myrick – guitars
- Donnie Nossov – bass, backing vocals
- Curly Smith – drums
- Steve Scales – percussion

== Charts ==
=== Weekly charts ===
Chart (1984–1985)	Peak position
Australia (Kent Music Report)	5
Belgium (Ultratop 50 Flanders)	19
Belgium (VRT Top 30 Flanders)	16
Canada (CHUM)	1
Canada (The Record)	1
Canada Top Singles (RPM)	1
Canada Adult Contemporary (RPM)	4
Ireland (IRMA)	6
New Zealand (Recorded Music NZ)	18
South Africa (Springbok Radio)	14
Switzerland (Schweizer Hitparade)	12
UK Singles (Official Charts)	9
US Billboard Hot 100	1
US Adult Contemporary (Billboard)	7
US Dance/Disco Top 80 (Billboard)	27
US Mainstream Rock Airplay (Billboard)	1
US Cash Box Top 100	1
West Germany (GfK)	13

Chart (1993)	Peak position
UK Singles (Official Charts)	56

=== Year-end charts ===
Chart (1984)	Position
Australia (Kent Music Report)	31
Canada Top Singles (RPM)	7
UK Singles (Gallup)	86
US Billboard Hot 100	11
US Cash Box Top 100	6

== Certifications ==
Region	Certification	Certified units/sales
Canada (Music Canada)	Platinum	100,000^{^}
United Kingdom (BPI)	Silver	200,000^{‡}
^{^} Shipments figures based on certification alone.^{‡} Sales+streaming figures based on certification alone.

== Tina Turner version ==
"Missing You"

Single by Tina Turner

from the album Wildest Dreams
- B-side: "The Difference Between Us"
- Released: July 15, 1996
- Genre: Dance-rock
- Length: 4:36
- Label: Parlophone
- Songwriters: John Waite; Mark Leonard; Charles Sandford
- Producer: Trevor Horn

Tina Turner singles chronology
"On Silent Wings" (1996)	"Missing You" (1996)	"Something Beautiful Remains" (1996)

Music video
- "Missing You" on YouTube

"Missing You" was also recorded by American singer and actress Tina Turner in 1996, and was released by Parlophone Records as the third single from her ninth solo album, Wildest Dreams (1996). When Waite's original version of "Missing You" topped the US Billboard Hot 100 in late 1984, it ended the reign of Tina Turner's "What's Love Got to Do with It". Turner's version of "Missing You", which was produced by Trevor Horn, hit No. 12 in the UK and No. 84 in the US in 1996. The accompanying music video was directed by Peter Lindbergh and premiered in mid-1996.

The single "Missing You" included an edited single version of the track, an alternative mix and certain formats also the European non-album track "The Difference Between Us", later featured on the US edition of the Wildest Dreams album. The B-side of the US edition of the CD single was the non-album track "Do Something" which was the B-side of the UK single for "On Silent Wings".

=== Critical reception ===
Larry Flick from Billboard magazine complimented Turner's version as "a lushly arranged rendition". He wrote, "Under the shrewd guidance of mega-producer Trevor Horn, Turner's distinctive growl is pushed to deliciously dramatic heights and is matched by countless layers of synths and a crisp rock backbeat. The combined attention of the singer's loyalists and those who simply never get enough of this timeless tune should make this cover an instant (and most deserving) winner at top 40 and AC." A reviewer from Music Week gave the song a score of four out of five, adding that "a lottery show appearance and a fine cover of this John Waite hit should do the business for la Turner."

=== Versions and mixes ===
- European album version – 4:36
- US album version – 4:40
- Single edit – 4:02
- Alternate mix – 4:04

=== Charts ===
Chart (1996)	Peak position
Belgium (Ultratip Bubbling Under Flanders)	3
Canada Top Singles (RPM)	23
Estonia (Eesti Top 20)	11
Europe (Eurochart Hot 100)	70
Germany (Media Control)	66
Iceland (Íslenski Listinn Topp 40)	14
Netherlands (Dutch Top 40 Tipparade)	16
Netherlands (Dutch Single Tip)	10
Scottish Singles Sales (Official Charts)	7
UK Singles (Official Charts)	12
US Billboard Hot 100	84
US Adult Contemporary (Billboard)	16

== Brooks & Dunn version ==
"Missing You"

Single by Brooks & Dunn

from the album Tight Rope
- B-side: "The Trouble with Angels"
- Released: 2 August 1999
- Genre: Country
- Length: 3:46
- Label: Arista Nashville
- Songwriters: John Waite, Mark Leonard, Charles Sandford
- Producers: Kix Brooks; Ronnie Dunn; Byron Gallimore

Brooks & Dunn singles chronology
"South of Santa Fe" (1999)	"Missing You" (1999)	"Beer Thirty" (1999)

Music video
- "Missing You" on YouTube

This song was also recorded by American country music group Brooks & Dunn and was released in August 1999 as the lead single from the album Tight Rope. Their version peaked at No. 6 on the Canadian RPM Country Tracks, No. 15 on the U.S. Billboard Hot Country Singles & Tracks and reached No. 75 on the U.S. Billboard Hot 100.

=== Music video ===
The music video was directed by Deaton Flanigen and premiered in mid-1999.

=== Charts ===
"Missing You" peaked at number 15 on the U.S. Billboard Hot Country Singles & Tracks charts for the week of 18 December 1999.

Chart (1999)	Peak position
Canada Country Singles (RPM)	6
US Billboard Hot 100	75
US Hot Country Songs (Billboard)	15

=== Year-end charts ===
Chart (1999)	Position
Canada Country Tracks (RPM)	63

== Re-releases and remakes ==
Waite re-recorded the song in 2006 as a duet with bluegrass singer Alison Krauss. This re-recording was included on Waite's album Downtown: Journey of a Heart and Krauss's A Hundred Miles or More: A Collection, both released via Rounder Records. The rendition spent 21 weeks on Hot Country Songs between December 2006 and mid-2007, peaking at number 34.

=== John Waite and Alison Krauss ===
Chart (2006–2007)	Peak position
US Hot Country Songs (Billboard)	34

== See also ==
- List of number-one singles of 1984 (Canada)
- List of Billboard Hot 100 number-one singles of the 1980s
- List of Billboard Mainstream Rock number-one songs of the 1980s
- List of Cash Box Top 100 number-one singles of 1984
