= Mad Max =

Australian media franchise

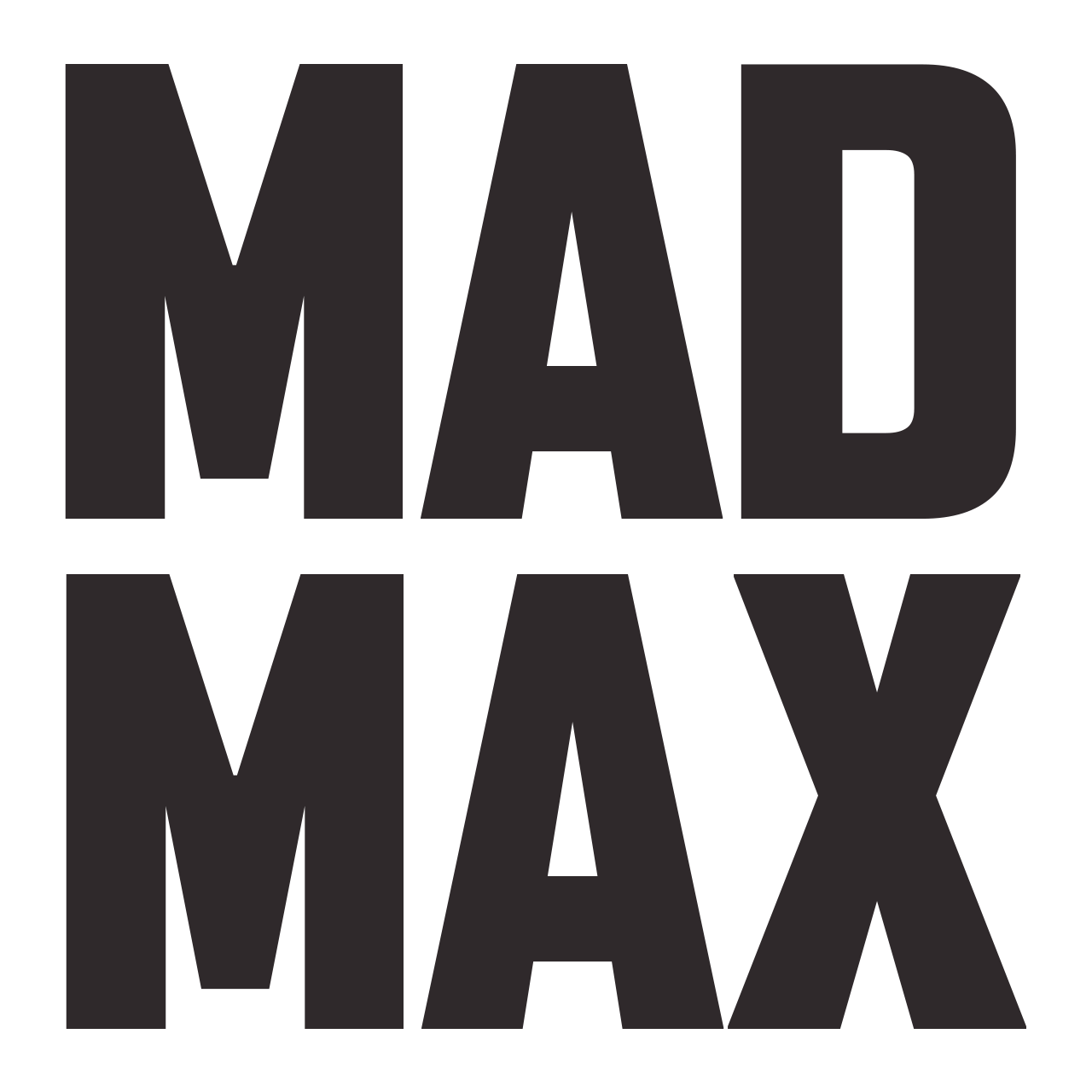
- Official franchise logo since 2015
- Created by: George Miller; Byron Kennedy
- Original work: Mad Max (1979)
- Owner: Warner Bros. Entertainment
- Years: 1979–present

Print publications
- Novels: Mad Max (1979); Mad Max 2 (1982); Mad Max Beyond Thunderdome (1985)
- Comics: Mad Max: Fury Road (2015)

Films and television
- Films: Mad Max (1979); Mad Max 2 (1981); Mad Max Beyond Thunderdome (1985); Mad Max: Fury Road (2015); Furiosa: A Mad Max Saga (2024)

Games
- Video games: Mad Max (1990); Mad Max (2015)

Audio
- Soundtracks: Mad Max (1980); Mad Max 2 (1982); Mad Max Beyond Thunderdome (1985); Mad Max: Fury Road (2015); Furiosa: A Mad Max Saga (2024)

Mad Max is an Australian media franchise created by George Miller and Byron Kennedy. It centres on a series of post-apocalyptic and dystopian action films. The franchise began in 1979 with Mad Max, and was followed by three sequels: Mad Max 2 (1981; released in the United States as The Road Warrior), Mad Max Beyond Thunderdome (1985) and Mad Max: Fury Road (2015); Miller directed or co-directed all four films. A spin-off, Furiosa: A Mad Max Saga, was released in 2024 and was also directed by Miller. Mel Gibson originally portrayed the series's title character, Max Rockatansky, in the first three films, while Tom Hardy and Jacob Tomuri portrayed the character in the later two films.

The series follows Max Rockatansky, who starts the series as a police officer in a future Australia which is experiencing societal collapse due to war, critical resource shortages, and ecocide. As Australia devolves further into barbarity, Max becomes a wandering drifter in the wasteland. He periodically encounters remaining pockets of civilisation, which rope him into their political machinations or personal problems. Max, who is habitually wary of others, frequently struggles to decide whether to help others or go his own way. Ultimately, he assists the survivors in the nick of time before departing into the wasteland once more.

The series has had a highly positive reception; Mad Max 2 and Fury Road in particular have been ranked among the best action films ever made. The series has also had a significant impact on popular culture, most notably apocalyptic and post-apocalyptic fiction, and encompasses works in additional media including video games and comic books. In 2016, Fury Road became the first film of the Mad Max franchise to receive Academy Award recognition, winning six of its ten nominations. It is an example of the dieselpunk genre.

== Premise and continuity ==
The exact causes of the collapse of civilization in the series are never specified, but some details are given. In the timeline of the first three films, the 1979 oil crisis caused by the Iranian Revolution worsened, leading to worldwide energy shortages and unrest. Tensions boiled over when Iranian forces attacked Saudi Arabia, igniting a massive war in the Middle East and around the world. In the timeline of the later two films (Fury Road and Furiosa), the collapse happened around the 2010s, and was caused by a combination of resource wars and subsequent environmental damage.

The first Mad Max film takes place in the original timeline and is a mostly traditional origin story. In a dystopian Australia where the government no longer has the capacity to effectively protect its citizens, Max Rockatansky is a skilled policeman trying to keep order on the highways. When Max takes his family to the beach for a holiday, a vicious biker gang murders his wife and child. Max kills the gang in revenge. Disillusioned by the collapse of ordered society, Max quits his job and becomes a wanderer in the increasingly devastated wasteland.

The remaining Mad Max films follow Max's comings and goings in the wasteland. By Mad Max 2, global war has destroyed the remaining world governments. The old society has essentially collapsed, and gangs and warlords dominate the wasteland. Isolated pockets of civilisation remain, desperately preserving remnants of pre-apocalyptic technology, especially oil refineries (Mad Max 2, Furiosa, Fury Road). By the time of Beyond Thunderdome, Furiosa, and Fury Road, society has devolved into a barter economy, with chattel and sex slavery being widespread. Furiosa and Fury Road also suggest that Christianity and other pre-apocalypse World religions have been replaced by new religions native to the wasteland. While most of the wasteland appears to be desert-like there have been a few green areas as seen in Beyond Thunderdome and Furiosa.

During his wanderings, Max periodically encounters remaining pockets of civilisation, which rope him into their political machinations or personal problems. Typically, Max goes along for self-interested reasons, but eventually his motives become more altruistic. Mad Max films typically highlight their protagonists' struggle to reclaim their humanity in a dystopian wasteland that has taught them to place little value on kindness and decency.

Most Mad Max films are told from the perspective of a questionably reliable narrator retelling the story many years after the fact, suggesting that the characters of Max and Furiosa have crossed over into the folklore of a survivor civilisation. (Although Fury Road lacks a narrator, Miller has said that in his mind, it was also "based on the Word Burgers of the History Men [cf. folktales told by bards or griots] and eyewitness accounts of those who survived.") Miller "sees Mad Max as a series of legends about the titular character, the kinds of campfire stories that might be passed around in the Wasteland at dark." Because Mad Max films are generally told as folklore, the Mad Max franchise has historically been less concerned with continuity than most science fiction or fantasy franchises, like Star Wars or Star Trek. There is "no strict chronology," and the films are allowed to contradict each other. At least one critic has suggested that "the franchise’s canon cannot be reconciled in any way — barring the introduction of time travel."

== Films ==
Film	Release date	Directed by	Screenplay by	Story by	Produced by
Mad Max	12 April 1979	George Miller	George Miller & James McCausland	George Miller & Byron Kennedy	Byron Kennedy
Mad Max 2	24 December 1981	George Miller	Terry Hayes, George Miller & Brian Hannant	Terry Hayes, George Miller & Brian Hannant	Byron Kennedy
Mad Max Beyond Thunderdome	10 July 1985	George Miller & George Ogilvie	Terry Hayes & George Miller	Terry Hayes & George Miller	George Miller
Mad Max: Fury Road	15 May 2015	George Miller	George Miller, Nico Lathouris & Brendan McCarthy	George Miller, Nico Lathouris & Brendan McCarthy	PJ Voeten, Doug Mitchell & George Miller
Furiosa: A Mad Max Saga	24 May 2024	George Miller	George Miller & Nico Lathouris	George Miller & Nico Lathouris	Doug Mitchell & George Miller

=== Mad Max (1979) ===
Mad Max is a 1979 Australian action film directed by George Miller and written by Miller and James McCausland from a story by Miller and producer Byron Kennedy. Set "a few years from now", it tells the story of highway policeman Max Rockatansky, who is repeatedly attacked by a criminal biker gang amidst a broader social breakdown, and who is caught between his opposing desires to stay home with his family and to take revenge on the bikers.

The film, starring the then little-known Mel Gibson, was released internationally in 1980. It became a top-grossing Australian film, and has been credited for further opening the global market to Australian New Wave films. For twenty years, it held the record in the Guinness Book of Records for the most profitable film ever made. The Blair Witch Project claimed the record in 1999.

=== Mad Max 2 (1981) ===
Mad Max 2 (released as The Road Warrior in the United States) is a 1981 Australian post-apocalyptic action film directed by George Miller and written by Miller, Terry Hayes, and Brian Hannant. Mel Gibson returned as Max Rockatansky. In this film, the societal breakdown depicted in Mad Max has degenerated into a global apocalypse, for which the film's prologue provides additional backstory. Max, now wandering through the post-apocalyptic wasteland, meets a community of oil drillers trying to defend itself against a roving band of marauders. The film follows an archetypal "Western" frontier movie motif, as does Max's role as a hardened man who rediscovers his humanity. Miller explained that the Mad Max films "effectively look forward to the past ... in the same way that the American Western allowed for allegory figures playing out morality tales in a landscape."

This sequel to Miller's Mad Max was a worldwide box office success that further boosted the career of Mel Gibson.

=== Mad Max Beyond Thunderdome (1985) ===
Mad Max Beyond Thunderdome is a 1985 film, the third installment in the franchise. The film was directed by George Miller and George Ogilvie, was written by Miller and Terry Hayes, and starred Mel Gibson and Tina Turner. In this film, Max is still wandering through the wasteland, civilisation has shifted to a barter economy, and gladiatorial combat is a key source of entertainment. After robbers steal Max's belongings, Bartertown's ruler Aunty Entity (played by Turner) recruits Max to fight a political rival in her "Thunderdome", with a promise to replace his belongings if he wins. In addition, Max also has an encounter with a lost tribe of children.

Miller initially lost interest in the project after his friend and producer Byron Kennedy was killed in a helicopter crash, but he later agreed to move forward with the assistance of Ogilvie. The original music score was composed by Maurice Jarre.

=== Mad Max: Fury Road (2015) ===
Mad Max: Fury Road, the fourth film of the franchise, is a 2015 post-apocalyptic action film directed by George Miller and written by Miller, Brendan McCarthy, and Nico Lathouris. It features Tom Hardy as Mad Max and Charlize Theron as his unlikely ally Imperator Furiosa. In this film, the remaining trappings of pre-apocalyptic civilisation have given way to a system of ruthless warlords, who dominate Australia's remaining agricultural and industrial centers with their private armies. Max, still wandering the wasteland, is captured by warlord Immortan Joe, but seizes the opportunity to escape when Joe's lieutenant Furiosa attempts her own escape from Joe's fortress with Immortan Joe's remaining wives. Max and Furiosa team up to fend off Joe's army so that they can reach Furiosa's home called the "Green Place", from where she was kidnapped twenty years earlier.

The film spent many years in development hell; Mel Gibson was attached to return as Max in 2003, but the production fell through. Location scouting resumed in 2009, but production was delayed until June 2012 due to unusually high levels of rain, which caused vegetation to grow in the Australian desert, detracting from the post-apocalyptic feeling that Miller wanted. Shooting ultimately took place in Namibia the following year.

In 2016, Fury Road won six Academy Awards from ten nominations; the six wins were more than any other film that year. In Metacritic's tally of 105 critic lists of the best films of the decade, Fury Road topped more lists than any other film, with 20 critics placing it at number one, over twice as many as second-placed Moonlight. In addition, a 2016 BBC poll of 177 film critics listed Mad Max: Fury Road as the 19th-best film of the 21st century.

=== Furiosa: A Mad Max Saga (2024) ===
Furiosa: A Mad Max Saga, the fifth film in the franchise, is a 2024 post-apocalyptic action film directed by George Miller and written by Miller and Nico Lathouris. It is a prequel to Fury Road; Miller said that while the franchise has "no strict chronology," it "probably" takes place after Beyond Thunderdome. The film stars Anya Taylor-Joy as Furiosa and Chris Hemsworth as her adversary, the warlord Dementus; in addition, Jacob Tomuri portrays Mad Max in a cameo appearance. In this origin film, Furiosa is kidnapped from the "Green Place" by members of Dementus's Biker Horde as Dementus later sells her to Immortan Joe. Over the following decade, she trains as a soldier and mechanic so that she can take revenge on Dementus for killing her mother.

While writing Fury Road, Miller and McCarthy found that they had enough story material for two additional scripts, one of which centered on Fury Road co-protagonist Imperator Furiosa. In March 2020, it was announced that Miller had begun auditioning new actresses for the title role; Miller considered using digital de-aging technology to make Charlize Theron look like she was in her twenties, but decided that the technology had not yet overcome the uncanny valley. Although Furiosa, like Fury Road, was disrupted by inclement weather in Australia, advances in VFX technology allowed the Furiosa shoot to move forward in Australia as originally planned. Shooting took place from June to October 2022.

=== Mad Max: The Wasteland (TBA) ===
In March 2015, Hardy revealed that he was attached to star in three more Mad Max films, following Fury Road. After the release of Fury Road, Miller announced that he was planning to release a follow-up film with the working title of Mad Max: The Wasteland. Miller provided more concrete details while promoting his films Three Thousand Years of Longing and Furiosa. He revealed that The Wasteland would be another Fury Road prequel, explaining that he and Lathouris had written what was "basically ... a novella" about Max's travels in the Wasteland in the year preceding his capture by Immortan Joe's forces at the start of Fury Road, and that they were planning to adapt the novella into a screenplay. Miller envisioned that The Wasteland would feature a character-based story like that of Furiosa, although there would still be "a lot of action." He added that he was "waiting to see the reception on Furiosa" before taking more concrete steps.

Following the release of Furiosa, Hardy (who was promoting The Bikeriders at the time) said "I don't think it's happening" in an interview, either talking about his involvement in the film or the film itself.

Miller confirmed in a February 2025 interview with Vulture that he was still interested in making The Wasteland, but hoped to focus on other projects first. Stating that, "But if for whatever reason the planets align, you can never tell. Too often, you're lining up to do a movie and then something happens. Some things fall into place and some don't, so all I can say is we'll see."

== Cast and crew ==
=== Cast ===
List indicators

This section includes characters who will appear or have appeared in the franchise.

- An empty grey cell indicates the character was not in the film, or that the character's official presence has not yet been confirmed.
- ^{A} indicates an appearance through archival footage or audio.
- ^{O} indicates an older version of the character.
- ^{Y} indicates a younger version of the character.

Characters	Films					Video game
Characters	Mad Max	Mad Max 2	Mad Max Beyond Thunderdome	Mad Max: Fury Road	Furiosa: A Mad Max Saga	Mad Max
Characters	1979	1981	1985	2015	2024	2015
Max Rockatansky	Mel Gibson	Mel Gibson	Mel Gibson	Tom Hardy	Jacob Tomuri Tom Hardy^{A}	Bren Foster
Jessie Rockatansky	Joanne Samuel	Joanne Samuel^{A}				
Sprog Rockatansky	Brendan Heath	Brendan Heath^{A}				
Benno Swaisey	Max Fairchild					
Toecutter	Hugh Keays-Byrne					
Jim "Goose" Rains	Steve Bisley					
Bubba Zanetti	Geoff Parry					
Johnny the Boy	Tim Burns					
May Swaisey	Sheila Florence					
Nightrider	Vincent Gil					
Gyro Captain		Bruce Spence				
The Humungus		Kjell Nilsson				
Wez		Vernon Wells				
The Feral Kid		Emil Minty^{Y} Harold Baigent^{O}				
Warrior Woman		Virginia Hey				
Pappagallo		Michael Preston				
Broken Victim		Max Fairchild				
Aunty Entity			Tina Turner			
Savannah Nix			Helen Buday			
Jedediah			Bruce Spence			
Jedediah Jr.			Adam Cockburn			
Pig Killer			Robert Grubb			
Ironbar Bassey			Angry Anderson			
Imperator Furiosa				Charlize Theron	Anya Taylor-Joy Alyla Browne^{Y} Charlize Theron^{A}^{O}	
Immortan Joe Moore				Hugh Keays-Byrne	Lachy Hulme Hugh Keays-Byrne^{A}	
Glory the Child				Coco Jack Gillies		Madison Carlon
Rictus Erectus				Nathan Jones	Nathan Jones	
The Organic Mechanic				Angus Sampson	Angus Sampson	Fred Tatasciore
The People Eater				John Howard	John Howard	
Nux				Nicholas Hoult	Nicholas Hoult^{A}	
Splendid Angharad				Rosie Huntington-Whiteley	Rosie Huntington-Whiteley^{A}	
Capable				Riley Keough	Riley Keough^{A}	
The Dag				Abbey Lee	Abbey Lee^{A}	
Toast the Knowing				Zoë Kravitz	Zoë Kravitz^{A}	
Cheedo the Fragile				Courtney Eaton	Courtney Eaton^{A}	
The Bullet Farmer				Richard Carter	Lee Perry Richard Carter^{A}	
The Doof Warrior				iOTA	iOTA	
Valkyrie				Megan Gale	Dylan Adonis Megan Gale^{A}	
Chumbucket					Bryan Probets	Jason Spisak
Scabrous Scrotus					Josh Helman	Travis Willingham
Slit				Josh Helman		
Keeper of the Seeds				Melissa Jaffer		
Warlord Dr. Dementus					Chris Hemsworth	
Praetorian Jack					Tom Burke	
War Boy					Daniel Webber	
Mary Jabassa					Charlee Fraser	
History Man					George Shevtsov	

== Reception ==
=== Box office performance ===
Film	Release date	Box office gross				Budget	Ref(s)
Film	Release date	Australia	North America	Other territories	Worldwide	Budget	Ref(s)
Mad Max	12 April 1979	A$5,355,490	$8,750,000	$91,000,000	$99,750,000	A$200,000	
Mad Max 2	24 December 1981	A$10,847,491	$23,667,907	$21,000,000^{R}	$36,000,000^{R}	A$4.5 million	
Mad Max Beyond Thunderdome	10 July 1985	A$4,272,802	$36,230,219	$16,000,000^{R}	$52,000,000^{R}	A$12 million	
Mad Max: Fury Road	15 May 2015	A$21,606,347	$154,280,290	$261,152,322	$380,418,444	US$150 million	
Furiosa: A Mad Max Saga	24 May 2024	N/A	$67,475,791	$106,700,000	$174,175,791	US$168 million	
Total		A$36,547,536	$290,232,977	$37 million^{R} +$438 million	A$72 million^{R} +US$624 million	A$17 million +US$322 million	
List indicator: A dark grey cell indicates the information is not available for the film.

^{R}Distributor rental

=== Critical and public response ===
Film	Rotten Tomatoes	Metacritic
Mad Max	90% (71 reviews)	73 (14 reviews)
Mad Max 2	94% (62 reviews)	77 (15 reviews)
Mad Max Beyond Thunderdome	79% (58 reviews)	71 (18 reviews)
Mad Max: Fury Road	97% (440 reviews)	91 (53 reviews)
Furiosa: A Mad Max Saga	90% (411 reviews)	79 (63 reviews)

Audiences surveyed by CinemaScore gave both Mad Max: Fury Road and Furiosa: A Mad Max Saga a grade of "B+" on a scale of A+ to F.

== Music ==
=== Soundtracks ===
Title	U.S. release date	Length	Composer(s)	Label
Mad Max (Original Motion Picture Soundtrack)	30 April 1980	31:25	Brian May	Varèse Sarabande
Mad Max 2 (Original Motion Picture Soundtrack)	11 January 1982	35:08	Brian May	Varèse Sarabande
Mad Max Beyond Thunderdome (Original Motion Picture Soundtrack)	August 1985	44:27	Tina Turner and Maurice Jarre	Capitol Records
Mad Max: Fury Road (Original Motion Picture Soundtrack)	12 May 2015	71:01	Tom Holkenborg	WaterTower Music
Furiosa: A Mad Max Saga (soundtrack)	17 May 2024	70:35	Tom Holkenborg	WaterTower Music

== Awards ==
Film	Release date	Awards	
Film	Release date	Win	Nomination
Mad Max	12 April 1979	AACTA Awards for Best Original Score in Film 1979 · Brian May; AACTA Awards Best Editing in Film 1979 · Clifford Hayes, Tony Paterson; AACTA Awards for Best Sound in Film 1979 · Byron Kennedy, Roger Savage, Ned Dawson, ...; Australian Film Institute Jury Prize 1979 · George Miller, Byron Kennedy	
Mad Max 2	24 December 1981	AACTA Awards for Best Direction in Film 1982 · George Miller; AACTA Awards Best Editing in Film 1982 · George Miller, David Stiven, Tim Wellburn, ...; AACTA Awards Best Costume Design in Film 1982 · Norma Moriceau; AACTA Awards for Best Production Design in Film 1982 · Graham Walker; AACTA Awards for Best Sound in Film 1982 · Byron Kennedy, Roger Savage, Marc van Buuren, ...; Los Angeles Film Critics Association Award for Best Foreign Language Film 1983 · George Miller	
Mad Max Beyond Thunderdome	10 July 1985	NAACP Image Award for Outstanding Actress in a Motion Picture; 1985 · Tina Turner	
Mad Max: Fury Road	15 May 2015	Critics' Choice Movie Award for Best Action Movie 2016; Academy Award for Best Costume Design 2016 · Jenny Beavan; Academy Award for Best Film Editing 2016 · Margaret Sixel; Academy Award for Best Sound Mixing 2016 · Ben Osmo, Gregg Rudloff, Chris Jenkins; Academy Award for Best Production Design 2016 · Colin Gibson, Lisa Thompson; Academy Award for Best Makeup and Hairstyling 2016 · Lesley Vanderwalt, Elka Wardega, Damian Martin; Academy Award for Best Sound Editing 2016 · Mark Mangini, David White; Screen Actors Guild Award for Outstanding Performance by a Stunt Ensemble in a Motion Picture 2016; AACTA Awards for Best Film 2015 · George Miller, Doug Mitchell, P.J. Voeten; BAFTA Award for Best Editing 2016 · Margaret Sixel	
Furiosa: A Mad Max Saga	24 May 2024	N/A	

== Other media ==
Many licensed products are based on the Mad Max franchise. Products include novels, comic books, video games, and other materials.

=== Novels ===
Novelisations of the first three films have also been published by QB Books. The first two novelisations were written by Terry Hayes, who ended up co-writing the script for the second film after getting along well with Miller. A novelisation for the third film was written by Joan D. Vinge.

=== Video games ===
Mad Max is a 1990 video game for the Nintendo Entertainment System developed by Gray Matter and published by Mindscape. It is based on the film Mad Max 2, with the object of the game is to survive life in the post-apocalyptic world by battling survivalists and collecting resources. Mindscape did develop another Mad Max game originally titled The Road Warrior for Super Nintendo Entertainment System and Sega Genesis, but due to Mindscape losing the license before completion they changed the title to Outlander to avoid legal issues.

Mad Max is a 2015 video game developed by Avalanche Studios and published by Warner Bros. Interactive Entertainment. It is based on the setting of Mad Max and was released for PlayStation 4, Windows, Xbox One, Linux, and macOS. The titular character was voiced by Bren Foster.

At the 2024 premiere for Furiosa: A Mad Max Saga, Miller said that he would like for a future Mad Max game to be directed by Metal Gear creator Hideo Kojima. After viewing an advance showing of Furiosa, Kojima wrote on Twitter that he had been a fan of the franchise since he saw the first Mad Max film when he was sixteen. He added that Miller "is my God, and the SAGA that he tells is my Bible."

=== Comic books ===
Mad Max: Fury Road is a limited comic book series created by George Miller, Nico Lathouris, and Mark Sexton. Serving as a prequel to the 2015 film of the same name, the series focuses on several of the film's characters. It consists of four issues. Beginning in May 2015, Vertigo published one issue per month, ending in August. A single-volume collection of all of the issues was published on 26 August. Reception of the series has been mixed; some consider it unnecessary and poorly executed, and many harshly criticised the issue centred on Imperator Furiosa. However, the issue focused on Nux and Immortan Joe and the two issues focused on Max Rockatansky were received more positively. Characters from the comic book series were later adapted to the 2015 Mad Max video game and the 2024 film Furiosa: A Mad Max Saga.

=== Cancelled television series ===
In March 1996, it was reported that Warner Bros. Television was developing a Mad Max television series, executively produced by George Miller for first-run syndication with hopes to premiere the series in the autumn of 1997.

=== Other appearances ===
The trailer for the 2021 film Space Jam: A New Legacy revealed the film's inclusion of Mad Max characters among other Warner Bros. characters in crowd scenes. In the actual film, in addition to characters being spectators, Wile E. Coyote and the Road Runner appear in the Mad Max world doing their classic chase with Wile E. as a War Boy, before Bugs Bunny and LeBron James show up to get them both. Footage from Fury Road is featured with the duo edited into it.

== Bibliography ==
- Melvin Zed (2022). Mad Max : ultraviolence dans le cinéma, partie 1 (1966-1979) (in French). Rififi. ISBN 2958046818..
- Melvin Zed (2025). Mad Max 2 : les guerriers de la route (1979-1982) (in French). Rififi. ISBN 9782958046842..
