= Private Dancer Tour =

1985 concert tour by Tina Turner

- Tour by Tina Turner
- Promotional poster for tour
- Location: Asia; Australia; Europe; North America
- Associated album: Private Dancer
- Start date: February 19, 1985
- End date: December 28, 1985
- Legs: 5
- No. of shows: 185
- Attendance: 2.5 million
- Box office: $40 million ($116.94 million in 2024 dollars)

Tina Turner concert chronology
- 1984 World Tour (1984); Private Dancer Tour (1985); Break Every Rule World Tour (1987–1988)

The Private Dancer Tour was the fifth concert tour by singer Tina Turner. In support of her fifth studio album, Private Dancer (1984), the tour helped to establish Turner as a major solo artist of the 1980s and a dynamic solo performer, after initially starting out singing with ex-husband Ike Turner's band. The tour is often considered one of the best comebacks in music history. The 180-date, eleven-month world tour traveled across Europe, North America and Australasia. Notably, Turner played a show in Budapest, Hungary, the only show of the tour behind the Iron Curtain. The concerts received many accolades, including the "Most Creative Tour Package" and "Comeback Tour Of The Year" awards from Pollstar.

== Broadcasts and recordings ==
VHS cover of concert video

The two March 1985 shows at Birmingham, England's NEC Arena were filmed and released as Tina Live: Private Dancer Tour. The VHS release featured special guests Bryan Adams and David Bowie.

== Band ==
- James Ralston – guitar, vocals
- Jamie West-Oram – guitar, vocals
- Bob Feit – bass guitar
- Jack Bruno – drums
- Timmy Cappello – percussion, keyboards, saxophone, vocals
- Kenny Moore – piano, vocals

== Opening acts ==
- Glenn Frey (North America, select dates)
- Mr. Mister (North America, select dates)
- John Parr (North America, select dates)
- Go West (North America, select dates)
- FM (West Germany, April/May 1985)
- Strange Advance (Canada) (select dates)
- Limited Warranty (Omaha)
- Eric Martin Band (Reno)
- Wang Chung (Canada) (select dates)

== Setlist ==
Europe

Act 1

1. "Let's Pretend We're Married"
2. "Show Some Respect"
3. "I Might Have Been Queen"
4. "River Deep – Mountain High"
5. "What's Love Got to Do with It"
6. "Nutbush City Limits"
7. "I Can't Stand The Rain"
8. "Better Be Good to Me"

Act 2

9. "Private Dancer"
10. "Let's Stay Together"
11. "Help!"
12. "It's Only Love"
13. "Steel Claw"
14. "Proud Mary"

Encore

15. "Legs"
16. "Tonight"
17. "Let's Dance"

Notes

- During the March 23 performance at the NEC Arena in Birmingham, Turner was joined onstage by David Bowie to perform "Tonight" and "Let's Dance".
- During the March 24 performance at the NEC Arena in Birmingham, Turner was joined onstage by Bryan Adams to perform "It's Only Love".
North America/Australia/Asia

Act 1

1. "Show Some Respect"
2. "I Might Have Been Queen"
3. "River Deep – Mountain High"
4. "Nutbush City Limits"
5. "I Can't Stand The Rain"
6. "Better Be Good to Me"

Act 2

7. "Private Dancer"

Act 3

8. "One of the Living"
9. "We Don't Need Another Hero (Thunderdome)"
10. "What's Love Got to Do with It"
11. "Let's Stay Together"
12. "Help!"

Act 4

13. "It's Only Love"
14. "Steel Claw"
15. "Proud Mary"

Encore

16. "Legs"
17. "Dancing in the Dark"

== Tour dates ==
Date	City	Country	Venue
Europe
February 19, 1985	Helsinki	Finland	Helsinki Ice Hall
February 21, 1985	Drammen	Norway	Drammenshallen
February 22, 1985	Gothenburg	Sweden	Lisebergshallen
February 23, 1985	Stockholm	Sweden	Johanneshovs Isstadion
February 24, 1985	Copenhagen	Denmark	Falkoner Teatret
February 28, 1985	Ludwigshafen	West Germany	Friedrich-Ebert-Halle
March 1, 1985	Munich	West Germany	Rudi-Sedlmayer-Halle
March 2, 1985	Frankfurt	West Germany	Jahrhunderthalle
March 3, 1985	Hamburg	West Germany	CCH Saal 1
March 4, 1985	West Berlin	West Germany	Deutschlandhalle
March 7, 1985	Böblingen	West Germany	Böblinger Sporthalle
March 8, 1985	Zürich	Switzerland	Hallenstadion
March 9, 1985	Würzburg	West Germany	Carl-Diem-Halle
March 11, 1985	Brighton	England	Brighton Centre
March 12, 1985	Bournemouth	England	Windsor Hall
March 14, 1985	London	England	Wembley Arena
March 15, 1985	London	England	Wembley Arena
March 16, 1985	London	England	Wembley Arena
March 17, 1985	London	England	Wembley Arena
March 20, 1985	Edinburgh	Scotland	Edinburgh Playhouse
March 21, 1985	Manchester	England	Apollo Theater
March 23, 1985	Birmingham	England	NEC Arena
March 24, 1985	Birmingham	England	NEC Arena
March 26, 1985	Paris	France	Zénith de Paris
March 27, 1985	Lyon	France	Halle Tony Garnier
March 28, 1985	Nice	France	Théâtre de verdure de Nice
March 29, 1985	Milan	Italy	Teatro Tenda di Lampugnano
March 31, 1985	Klagenfurt	Austria	Stadthalle
April 1, 1985	Graz	Austria	Eisstadion Liebenau
April 2, 1985	Budapest	Hungary	Budapest Sportcsarnok
April 3, 1985	Vienna	Austria	Wiener Stadthalle
April 4, 1985	Linz	Austria	Linzer Sporthalle
April 6, 1985	Munich	West Germany	Olympiahalle
April 7, 1985	Saarbrücken	West Germany	Saarlandhalle
April 8, 1985	Rotterdam	Netherlands	Sportpaleis
April 9, 1985	Rotterdam	Netherlands	Sportpaleis
April 10, 1985	Brussels	Belgium	Forest National
April 11, 1985	Frankfurt	West Germany	Jahrhunderthalle
April 12, 1985	Frankfurt	West Germany	Jahrhunderthalle
April 13, 1985	Bremen	West Germany	Bremer Stadhalle
April 14, 1985	Dortmund	West Germany	Westfalenhalle
April 15, 1985	Düsseldorf	West Germany	Philipshalle
April 16, 1985	Brussels	Belgium	Forest National
April 18, 1985	Hamburg	West Germany	CCH Saal 1
April 19, 1985	Eppelheim	West Germany	Rhein-Neckar-Halle
April 20, 1985	Munich	West Germany	Olympiahalle
April 21, 1985	Zürich	Switzerland	Hallenstadion
April 22, 1985	Nuremberg	West Germany	Frankenhalle
April 24, 1985	West Berlin	West Germany	Deutschlandhalle
April 25, 1985	Bremen	West Germany	Bremer Stadthalle
April 26, 1985	Düsseldorf	West Germany	Philipshalle
April 27, 1985	Frankfurt	West Germany	Festhalle
April 28, 1985	Münster	West Germany	Halle Münsterland
April 30, 1985	Kiel	West Germany	Ostseehalle
May 1, 1985	Cologne	West Germany	Kölner Sporthalle
May 3, 1985	West Berlin	West Germany	Deutschlandhalle
May 4, 1985	Hanover	West Germany	Niedersachsenhalle
May 5, 1985	Hamburg	West Germany	Alsterdorfer Sporthalle
May 7, 1985	Böblingen	West Germany	Böblinger Sporthalle
May 8, 1985	Munich	West Germany	Olympiahalle
May 9, 1985	Münchenstein	Switzerland	St. Jakobshalle
North America
July 8, 1985	St. John's	Canada	Memorial Stadium
July 9, 1985	St. John's	Canada	Memorial Stadium
July 10, 1985	St. John's	Canada	Memorial Stadium
July 11, 1985	St. John's	Canada	Memorial Stadium
July 14, 1985	Fredericton	Canada	Aitken University Centre
July 15, 1985	Moncton	Canada	Moncton Coliseum
July 16, 1985	Halifax	Canada	Halifax Metro Centre
July 17, 1985	Halifax	Canada	Halifax Metro Centre
July 19, 1985	Montréal	Canada	Montreal Forum
July 21, 1985	Worcester	United States	Centrum in Worcester
July 22, 1985	Worcester	United States	Centrum in Worcester
July 25, 1985	Providence	United States	Providence Civic Center
July 26, 1985	Portland	United States	Cumberland County Civic Center
July 27, 1985	Hartford	United States	Hartford Civic Center
July 28, 1985	East Rutherford	United States	Brendan Byrne Arena
July 31, 1985	Philadelphia	United States	The Spectrum
August 1, 1985	New York City	United States	Madison Square Garden
August 2, 1985	New York City	United States	Madison Square Garden
August 3, 1985	Allentown	United States	Allentown Fairgrounds Grandstand
August 5, 1985	Landover	United States	Capital Centre
August 7, 1985	Wantagh	United States	Jones Beach Marine Theater
August 8, 1985	Wantagh	United States	Jones Beach Marine Theater
August 10, 1985	Hershey	United States	Hersheypark Stadium
August 11, 1985	Rochester	United States	Rochester Community War Memorial
August 12, 1985	Saratoga Springs	United States	Saratoga Performing Arts Center
August 14, 1985	Toronto	Canada	CNE Grandstand
August 15, 1985	Lake Placid	United States	Olympic Center Ice Rink
August 16, 1985	Montreal	Canada	Montreal Forum
August 17, 1985	Ottawa	Canada	Lansdowne Park
August 18, 1985	Ottawa	Canada	Lansdowne Park
August 21, 1985	Toledo	United States	Centennial Hall
August 22, 1985	Richfield Township	United States	The Coliseum at Richfield
August 23, 1985	Pittsburgh	United States	Civic Arena
August 24, 1985	Charleston	United States	Charleston Civic Center
August 25, 1985	Cincinnati	United States	Riverfront Coliseum
August 28, 1985	Detroit	United States	Joe Louis Arena
August 29, 1985	Columbus	United States	Battelle Hall
August 31, 1985	Charlevoix	United States	Castle Farms Music Theatre
September 1, 1985	Notre Dame	United States	Athletic & Convocation Center
September 3, 1985	Flint	United States	Atwood Stadium
September 4, 1985	Kalamazoo	United States	Wings Stadium
September 5, 1985	Fort Wayne	United States	War Memorial Coliseum
September 6, 1985	Lexington	United States	Rupp Arena
September 7, 1985	Indianapolis	United States	Market Square Arena
September 8, 1985	Evansville	United States	Roberts Municipal Stadium
September 10, 1985	Champaign	United States	Assembly Hall
September 11, 1985	Rosemont	United States	Rosemont Horizon
September 12, 1985	Rosemont	United States	Rosemont Horizon
September 14, 1985	Milwaukee	United States	MECCA Arena
September 15, 1985	Madison	United States	Dane County Memorial Coliseum
September 17, 1985	Winnipeg	Canada	Winnipeg Arena
September 18, 1985	Saint Paul	United States	Roy Wilkins Auditorium
September 19, 1985	Iowa City	United States	Carver–Hawkeye Arena
September 20, 1985	Ames	United States	Hilton Coliseum
September 21, 1985	Omaha	United States	Omaha Civic Auditorium
September 24, 1985	Calgary	Canada	Olympic Saddledome
September 25, 1985	Edmonton	Canada	Northlands Coliseum
September 27, 1985	Vancouver	Canada	Pacific Coliseum
September 28, 1985	Vancouver	Canada	Pacific Coliseum
September 29, 1985	Tacoma	United States	Tacoma Dome
September 30, 1985	Portland	United States	Memorial Coliseum
October 2, 1985	Reno	United States	Lawlor Events Center
October 3, 1985	Oakland	United States	Oakland–Alameda County Coliseum Arena
October 4, 1985	Oakland	United States	Oakland–Alameda County Coliseum Arena
October 5, 1985	Irvine	United States	Irvine Meadows Amphitheatre
October 8, 1985	Los Angeles	United States	Universal Amphitheatre
October 9, 1985	Los Angeles	United States	Universal Amphitheatre
October 10, 1985	Los Angeles	United States	Universal Amphitheatre
October 11, 1985	Los Angeles	United States	Universal Amphitheatre
October 12, 1985	Los Angeles	United States	Universal Amphitheatre
October 18, 1985	Tempe	United States	ASU Activity Center
October 19, 1985	Las Cruces	United States	Pan American Center
October 20, 1985	Albuquerque	United States	Tingley Coliseum
October 23, 1985	Valley Center	United States	Britt Brown Arena
October 25, 1985	Oklahoma City	United States	MCC Arena
October 26, 1985	Kansas City	United States	Kemper Arena
October 27, 1985	Saint Louis	United States	Kiel Auditorium
October 28, 1985	Saint Louis	United States	Kiel Auditorium
October 30, 1985	Little Rock	United States	Barton Coliseum
October 31, 1985	Tulsa	United States	Tulsa Assembly Center
November 1, 1985	Dallas	United States	Reunion Arena
November 2, 1985	Austin	United States	Frank Erwin Center
November 3, 1985	Houston	United States	The Summit
November 6, 1985	Baton Rouge	United States	LSU Assembly Center
November 7, 1985	Tallahassee	United States	Tallahassee-Leon County Civic Center
November 8, 1985	Auburn	United States	Memorial Coliseum
November 9, 1985	Chattanooga	United States	UTC Arena
November 10, 1985	Memphis	United States	Mid-South Coliseum
November 13, 1985	Shreveport	United States	Hirsch Memorial Coliseum
November 14, 1985	Starkville	United States	Humphrey Coliseum
November 15, 1985	Birmingham	United States	BJCC Coliseum
November 16, 1985	Mursfreesboro	United States	Murphy Center
November 17, 1985	Knoxville	United States	Stokely Athletic Center
November 20, 1985	Morgantown	United States	WVU Coliseum
November 21, 1985	Roanoke	United States	Roanoke Civic Center
November 22, 1985	Hampton	United States	Hampton Coliseum
November 23, 1985	Greensboro	United States	Greensboro Coliseum
November 24, 1985	Columbia	United States	Carolina Coliseum
November 27, 1985	Atlanta	United States	Omni Coliseum
November 29, 1985	Charlotte	United States	Charlotte Coliseum
November 30, 1985	Savannah	United States	Martin Luther King, Jr. Arena
December 1, 1985	Jacksonville	United States	Veterans Memorial Coliseum
December 2, 1985	Pembroke Pines	United States	Hollywood Sportatorium
Oceania		United States	
December 7, 1985	Auckland	New Zealand	Mount Smart Stadium
December 10, 1985	Brisbane	Australia	Chandler Velodrome
December 12, 1985	Sydney	Australia	Sydney Entertainment Centre
December 13, 1985	Sydney	Australia	Sydney Entertainment Centre
December 15, 1985	Sydney	Australia	Sydney Entertainment Centre
December 17, 1985	Melbourne	Australia	Melbourne Sports and Entertainment Centre
December 18, 1985	Melbourne	Australia	Melbourne Sports and Entertainment Centre
December 19, 1985	Melbourne	Australia	Melbourne Sports and Entertainment Centre
December 20, 1985	Melbourne	Australia	Melbourne Sports and Entertainment Centre
December 23, 1985	Perth	Australia	Perth Entertainment Centre
December 24, 1985	Perth	Australia	Perth Entertainment Centre
Asia
December 27, 1985	Osaka	Japan	Festival Hall
December 28, 1985	Tokyo	Japan	Nippon Budokan
North America
December 31, 1985	Honolulu	United States	Blaisdell Arena

=== Box office score data ===
Venue	City	Tickets sold / available	Gross revenue
Centrum in Worcester	Worcester	23,776 / 23,776 (100%)	$372,142
Cumberland County Civic Center	Portland	8,462 / 8,462 (100%)	$138,195
Brendan Byrne Arena	East Rutherford	15,911 / 19,480 (82%)	$253,623
The Spectrum	Philadelphia	12,995 / 14,700 (88%)	$214,063
Capitol Centre	Landover	15,226 / 15,550 (98%)	$236,003
CNE Grandstand	Toronto	22,830 / 22,830 (100%)	$489,846
CCE Grandstand	Ottawa	26,006 / 27,000 (96%)	$507,117
Centennial Hall	Toledo	8,889 / 9,000 (99%)	$121,890
Charleston Civic Center	Charleston	12,839 / 12,839 (100%)	$189,330
Joe Louis Arena	Detroit	15,000 / 15,000 (100%)	$225,000
Athletic & Convocation Center	Notre Dame	7,267 / 7,482 (97%)	$190,005
War Memorial Coliseum	Fort Wayne	9,100 / 9,100 (100%)	$134,853
Market Square Arena	Indianapolis	12,619 / 12,619 (100%)	$189,285
Roberts Municipal Stadium	Evansville	8,686 / 8,686 (100%)	$130,290
Dane County Memorial Coliseum	Madison	8,471 / 9,813 (86%)	$138,973
Omaha Civic Auditorium	Omaha	9,051 / 10,000 (91%)	$132,582
Olympic Saddledome	Calgary	16,500 / 16,500 (100%)	$249,600
Tacoma Dome	Tacoma	18,840 / 25,000 (75%)	$310,414
Memorial Coliseum	Portland	11,338 / 11,338 (100%)	$164,332
Lawlor Events Center	Reno	10,848 / 10,848 (100%)	$174,568
Oakland–Alameda County Coliseum Arena	Oakland	26,889 / 26,889 (100%)	$470,557
Irvine Meadows Amphitheatre	Irvine	14,486 / 14,486 (100%)	$239,250
ASU Activity Center	Tempe	11,361 / 15,000 (76%)	$164,865
Pan American Center	Las Cruces	9,222 / 11,000 (84%)	$132,930
Kemper Arena	Kansas City	11,013 / 12,000 (92%)	$161,585
Tulsa Assembly Center	Tulsa	7,226 / 8,100 (89%)	$122,337
Reunion Arena	Dallas	14,191 / 17,000 (84%)	$211,327
The Summit	Houston	13,331 / 14,500 (92%)	$201,804
Tallahassee-Leon County Civic Center	Tallahassee	7,754 / 9,000 (86%)	$134,010
Mid-South Coliseum	Memphis	10,049 / 12,900 (78%)	$150,735
Stokely Athletic Center	Knoxville	10,430 / 10,430 (100%)	$145,599
Carolina Coliseum	Columbia	11,691 / 11,691 (100%)	$175,365
Omni Coliseum	Atlanta	12,767 / 12,767 (100%)	$191,205
Hollywood Sportatorium	Pembroke Pines	9,925 / 9,925 (100%)	$148,769
TOTAL		444,999 / 475,661 (94%)	$7,130,359
