= Mad Max Beyond Thunderdome (soundtrack) =

1985 soundtrack album

Mad Max Beyond Thunderdome (Original Motion Picture Soundtrack)

Soundtrack album by Tina Turner and Maurice Jarre
- Released: August 1985
- Recorded: 1985
- Genre: Film score
- Length: 44:27
- Label: Capitol
- Producers: Terry Britten; Mike Chapman; Maurice Jarre

Tina Turner chronology
Private Dancer (1984)	Mad Max Beyond Thunderdome (Original Motion Picture Soundtrack) (1985)	Break Every Rule (1986)

Maurice Jarre chronology
Witness (1985)	Mad Max Beyond Thunderdome (1985)	Enemy Mine (1985)

Singles from Mad Max Beyond Thunderdome: Original Motion Picture Soundtrack
- 1. "We Don't Need Another Hero (Thunderdome)" Released: June 21, 1985; 2. "One of the Living" Released: September 13, 1985

Professional ratings
Review scores
Source	Rating
AllMusic	4/5 stars
Filmtracks.com	4/5 stars

Mad Max Beyond Thunderdome (Original Motion Picture Soundtrack) is a soundtrack album for the 1985 film Mad Max Beyond Thunderdome. The album was originally released in 1985 on the Capitol Records label and reissued numerous times on different labels.

== Background ==
In addition to 26 minutes of the original orchestral score composed by Maurice Jarre and performed by the Royal Philharmonic Orchestra, the album includes Tina Turner's US and UK top-three single "We Don't Need Another Hero (Thunderdome)", which played over the end titles of the film. The single was released the year after Turner's comeback with the Private Dancer album and its series of hit singles. "We Don't Need Another Hero" was written and produced by Terry Britten and Graham Lyle (who also wrote "What's Love Got to Do with It") and appears on the album both as an extended vocal version and an extended instrumental, tracks originally released as the A- and B-sides of the 12" single. The vocal 7" mix has since appeared on the hits compilations Simply The Best in 1991 and All the Best in 2004. The alternate 7" instrumental mix remains unreleased on CD. The song received a Golden Globe nomination for Best Original Song in 1986 and a 1986 Grammy nomination for Best Pop Vocal Performance, Female.

The second Tina Turner track on the album, "One of the Living" (U.S. No. 15), was the film's opening titles song, produced by Mike Chapman and composed by Holly Knight - the team behind "Better Be Good to Me" - and also credited to Knight's band Device on both the film's end titles and the original vinyl album. Released as the follow-up single to "We Don't Need Another Hero", "One of the Living" was also remixed for both the 7" and 12" singles. Aside from the 7" remix appearing on The Platinum Collection three-disc CD set in 2009, the 7" dub, 12" special remix, 12" dub and 12" instrumental versions, co-produced and mixed by Steve Thompson and Michael Barbiero, all remain unreleased on CD. "One of the Living" won Turner a Grammy Award in 1985 for Best Rock Vocal Performance, Female.

The album is available digitally. Tracks "We Don't Need Another Hero (Thunderdome)" and "One of the Living" were included in deluxe edition of 30th anniversary issue of Tina Turner's album Private Dancer.

== Track listing ==
Mad Max Beyond Thunderdome: Original Motion Picture Soundtrack track listing
No.	Title	Writer(s)	Length
1.	"We Don't Need Another Hero (Thunderdome)"	Terry Britten, Graham Lyle	6:05
2.	"One of the Living"	Holly Knight	5:59
3.	"We Don't Need Another Hero (Thunderdome)" (Instrumental)	Britten, Lyle	6:30
4.	"Bartertown†"	Maurice Jarre	8:28
5.	"The Children†"	Jarre	2:11
6.	"Coming Home†"	Jarre	15:10
Total length:			44:27

† Performed by the Royal Philharmonic Orchestra

== Personnel ==
Musicians

- Tina Turner – lead vocals (tracks 1–2), additional background vocals (1)
- The Kings House School Choir – choir vocals (tracks 1, 3)
- Charlie Morgan – drums, additional percussion (tracks 1, 3)
- Nick Glennie-Smith – keyboards (tracks 1, 3)
- Graham Broad – percussion instruments (tracks 1, 3)
- Tim Cappello – saxophone (tracks 1, 3), saxophone solo (2)
- Terry Britten – guitar, bass guitar (tracks 1, 3)
- Gene Black – backing vocals, guitar (track 2)
- Holly Knight – keyboards, music programming, backing vocals (track 2)
- Royal Philharmonic Orchestra – orchestra (tracks 4–6)
- Maurice Jarre – orchestral conductor (tracks 4–6)
- Barry Griffith – concertmaster (tracks 4–6)
- Charles McMahon – didgeridoo (tracks 4–6)
- Cynthia Millar – ondes Martenot (tracks 4–6)
- Dominique Kim – ondes Martenot (tracks 4–6)
- Jeanne Loriod – ondes Martenot (tracks 4–6)

Production

- Tracks 1 and 3 recorded at Mayfair Studios, London.
- Track 2 recorded at Cherokee Studios, Los Angeles.
- Terry Britten – record producer (tracks 1, 3)
- John Hudson – sound engineer, sound mix (tracks 1, 3)
- Mike Chapman – producer (track 2)
- Humberto Gatica – remix, co-producer (track 2)
- Maurice Jarre – producer (tracks 4–6)
- Christopher Palmer – assistant to Maurice Jarre (tracks 4–6)
- Dick Lewzey – sound recording engineer (tracks 4–6)
- Tim Pennington – assistant sound recording engineer (tracks 4–6)

== Deluxe edition ==
Mad Max Beyond Thunderdome: The Complete Motion Picture Score

Film score by Maurice Jarre and the Royal Philharmonic Orchestra
- Released: 25 May 2010
- Recorded: 1985
- Genre: Film score
- Length: 122:02
- Label: Tadlow Music
- Producers: Maurice Jarre; James Fitzpatrick

In 2010, a deluxe edition of the soundtrack was released and includes Maurice Jarre's complete, intended score with music cues that were ultimately replaced in the final film by Tina Turner's songs. Although Jarre's alternate cues from the original album were included as bonus tracks, Turner's songs were not included, due to licensing issues (Warner Music currently owns copyrights to Turner's songs, at the time it was EMI).

Disc 1
No.	Title	Length
1.	"Original Main Title Music"	2:00
2.	"Max's Theme" / "The Desert"	2:41
3.	"Bartertown Theme"	1:55
4.	"Accents 2 Suspense"	3:48
5.	"Tragic Saxophone"	0:40
6.	"Heartbeat" / "Pigrock"	3:48
7.	"Master Blaster" / "The Manipulator" / "Embargo" / "Entity Humiliated"	2:29
8.	"The Discovery"	2:01
9.	"Conspiracy"	0:35
10.	"Thunderdome"	4:52
11.	"Darkness" / "Gulag"	3:48
12.	"Master in Underworld" / "Desert Hallucinating"	5:21
13.	"Magical"	3:02
14.	"Children's Theme"	2:13
15.	"Ceremony"	1:12
16.	"Confusion"	1:14
17.	"The Telling" / "I Ain't Captain Walker"	4:01
18.	"Compassion"	3:18
19.	"Tyrant"	2:45
20.	"The Leaving"	5:05
21.	"Underworld Takeover"	2:19
22.	"Arrival"	2:59
Total length:		62:06

Disc 2
No.	Title	Length
1.	"Max and Savannah Escape"	3:05
2.	"Boarding the Train"	2:22
3.	"Bartertown Destruction"	4:03
4.	"The Big Chase!"	11:44
5.	"Epilogue"	3:18
6.	"Bartertown"	8:27
7.	"The Children"	2:12
8.	"Coming Home"	15:15
9.	"Piano Overdubs for "The Big Chase!""	2:37
10.	"Organ Effects"	0:39
11.	"Plastic Tube Effects"	0:47
12.	"Wild Chords"	0:25
13.	"I Ain't Captain Walker" (performed by the City of Prague Philharmonic Orchestra)	5:02
Total length:		59:56

== Charts and certifications ==
=== Weekly charts ===
Weekly chart performance for Mad Max Beyond Thunderdome: Original Motion Picture Soundtrack
Chart (1985)	Peak position
Australian Albums (Kent Music Report)	31
Austrian Albums (Ö3 Austria)	17
Canadian Albums (RPM)	33
Dutch Albums (Album Top 100)	50
Finnish Albums (Suomen virallinen lista)	34
US Billboard 200	41
US Top R&B/Hip-Hop Albums (Billboard)	47

=== Year-end charts ===
Year-end chart performance for Mad Max Beyond Thunderdome: Original Motion Picture Soundtrack
Chart (1985)	Position
German Albums (Offizielle Top 100)	58

=== Certifications and sales ===
Certifications and sales for Mad Max Beyond Thunderdome: Original Motion Picture Soundtrack
Region	Certification	Certified units/sales
Canada (Music Canada)	Gold	50,000^{^}
^{^} Shipments figures based on certification alone.
