= Adam Cockburn =

Adam Cockburn may refer to:

- Adam Cockburn, Lord Ormiston (1656–1735), Scottish administrator, politician and judge
- Adam Cockburn (actor), Australian child actor and DJ
