= Tim Cappello =

American musical artist (born 1955)

- Born: May 3, 1955 (age 71); Harrison, New York, U.S.
- Occupations: Musician, composer
- Instruments: Vocals, saxophone, keyboards, guitar, drums, percussion
- Years active: 1977–present

Tim Cappello (born May 3, 1955), also credited as Timmy Cappello, is an American multi-instrumentalist, composer, and vocalist. He is primarily known for his saxophone work supporting Tina Turner in the 1980s and '90s, as well as for his musical performance in the 1987 vampire film The Lost Boys.

He is notable for his muscular physique, his sexually provocative movements during performances, and for a tendency to perform shirtless, with oiled skin and a ponytail.

== Early life ==
Cappello was born and grew up in the Silver Lake neighborhood of Harrison, New York, which, at the time, had a White Plains, New York, postal address. The youngest of three children, his Sicilian father was a local conductor and music teacher. Cappello started music lessons at age 4. When he was 15 years old, Cappello dropped out of high school and was accepted at the New England Conservatory of Music, playing both drums and keyboards for his audition. He later studied saxophone with Lennie Tristano.

== Career ==
Cappello studied intermittently with Lennie Tristano over a four-year span between touring with performers such as musician Eric Carmen and comedian Billy Crystal. He played saxophone for Peter Gabriel on his album Peter Gabriel 2 (1978) in addition to touring with Gabriel. Cappello also toured with Garland Jeffreys in 1978, playing both saxophone and keyboards. After struggling with heroin addiction, Cappello quit the drug "cold turkey" in 1979 and began bodybuilding in 1980. Cappello toured with Carly Simon later that same year, once appearing on stage in a leather g-string, as well as chains and a dog leash by which Simon pulled him onto the stage.

From 1981 to 1982, Cappello fronted his own pop band in New York City called The Ken Dolls—a band that included drummer J.P. "Thunderbolt" Patterson (also of The Dictators and Manitoba's Wild Kingdom) and Joe Carroll, a composer/producer who is president and founder of the Manhattan Producer's Alliance (ManHatPro). Cappello's sexual stage presence was further cultivated during his work with The Ken Dolls—performing in a style dubbed "porn pop", Cappello was known to perform in a g-string.

In 1984, Cappello was hired by Tina Turner as her keyboardist and saxophonist. Recording and touring with her over several years, Cappello's work can be heard on Turner's tracks "We Don't Need Another Hero" and "One of the Living" from Mad Max Beyond Thunderdome (1985) in addition to appearing in the music videos for both singles. Cappello performed on the 1993 soundtrack album What's Love Got to Do with It, playing saxophone as well as singing Ike Turner's vocal parts in an updated version of the song "Proud Mary". Cappello toured with Ringo Starr in 1992 and 1999 as a member of his All-Starr Band.

At 6 feet (1.8 m) tall, and reportedly 215 pounds (98 kg) in 1985, Cappello's size and appearance helped garner him roles in television and film. In 1987, he appeared in a musical performance in the film The Lost Boys where he both sang and played saxophone in a cover version of the song "I Still Believe" by The Call. As an actor, he appeared on the television shows The Equalizer and Miami Vice in 1987, as well as in the films Hearts of Fire with Bob Dylan in 1987 and Tap with Gregory Hines in 1989.

Cappello has composed music for film and television. He has worked with director Carole Langer on three occasions, composing the score for her 1987 film Radium City—a documentary about the women who worked for the Radium Dial Company in Ottawa, Illinois in the 1920s—for her four-hour documentary series about the Rat Pack for the A&E channel, and for her 2001 TV documentary Lana Turner... a Daughter's Memoir. He joined Tina Turner at the 1993 National Rugby League Grand Final at the original Sydney Football Stadium in Sydney, Australia as part of the Half Time entertainment in front of 42,329 people. Cappello also composed the score for the A&E Biography episode titled "Jerry Lewis: The Last American Clown" which first aired in 1996.

In 2018, Cappello played saxophone on the Netflix variety show The Break with Michelle Wolf during a segment called "Saxophone Apologies" during which Wolf addressed the lack of apologies from both Bill Clinton and the press for their treatment of Monica Lewinsky in relation to the Clinton–Lewinsky scandal.

In 2018, Tim was featured, along with singer Indiana, on the British Synthwave band GUNSHIP's single "Dark All Day" from the album of the same name. The album rose to number 1 in the Electronic charts in the US, UK, and Canada.

He also released his first solo album, Blood on the Reed, in 2018 and toured to support the album in 2019 and 2020 until COVID-19 hit.

In 2021 Tim was featured in the Netflix docuseries Worn Stories in which he tells about his relationship to his codpiece, first given to him by Tina Turner, as a symbol of strength in the face of the ups and downs of the music business and the saxophone's regard (or lack thereof) in popular music.

In 2021 and 2022, Timmy appeared as one of the rock experts on the AXS show 'The Top 10 Revealed, Starring Katie Daryl', appearing in four episodes in 2021 and again in 2022.

He made an appearance in June 2022 in a 35 minute video concert collaboration between Stranger Things and Doritos called 'Live From The Upside Down' starring Charli XCX, The Go-Go's, Corey Hart, and Soft Cell.

Cappello toured the US all through 2022 in support of his album Blood on the Reed.

In September 2022, Cappello was featured in the season 2 finale of the FX series Reservation Dogs. Cappello appears in the closing scene singing and playing saxophone to "I Still Believe" with White Jesus.

In September 2023, GUNSHIP released the "Unicorn" album, in which Cappello is featured in 'Monster in Paradise', 'Empress of the Damned' and 'Tech Noir 2' alongside other featured artists.

In December 2024, Cappello was once again featured alongside GUNSHIP in 'China in Your Hand'.

== In popular culture ==
Actor Jon Hamm portrayed a pony-tailed, shirtless saxophonist named "Sergio" in an SNL Digital Short titled "The Curse", which aired on Saturday Night Live (SNL) on January 30, 2010. In the short, Andy Samberg's character is cursed by Sergio, who appears out of nowhere playing his saxophone at inopportune times. Sergio's dancing and appearance resembled Cappello's performances in the film The Lost Boys and in the video for Tina Turner's 1985 single "One of the Living" from the Mad Max Beyond Thunderdome soundtrack.

In 2011, a video of a saxophone player interrupting college classes, and other public scenes, while repeatedly playing the saxophone riff from the 1984 pop ballad "Careless Whisper", was circulated on social media websites such as BuzzFeed and Urlesque. The saxophonist in the video, also known as Sexy Sax Man, is shirtless, long-haired and is named Sergio Flores, echoing both Cappello's image and Jon Hamm's character's in the SNL parody. Paste magazine ranked the video #3 on their list of the 10 best viral videos of 2011.

== Discography ==
=== Studio albums ===
- Blood on the Reed (2018)

=== Guest appearances ===
- "Perspective", "Home Sweet Home" (from Peter Gabriel's Peter Gabriel) (1978)
- "We Don't Need Another Hero (Thunderdome)", "One of the Living" (with Tina Turner from Mad Max Beyond Thunderdome soundtrack) (1985)
- "Typical Male" (with Tina Turner and Phil Collins from Break Every Rule) (1986)
- "I Still Believe" (from The Lost Boys soundtrack) (1987)
- "Tonight" (with Tina Turner and David Bowie from Tina Live in Europe) (1988)
- "Look Me in the Heart", "Ask Me How I Feel" (from Tina Turner's Foreign Affair) (1989)
- "Dark All Day" (from Gunship's Dark All Day) (2018)
- "Los Feliz" (from Sonder Wilde's Los Feliz) (2019)
- "Monster in Paradise" (from Gunship's Unicorn) (2023)
- "Empress Of The Damned" (from Gunship's Unicorn) (2023)
- "Nuclear Date Night" (from Gunship's Unicorn) (2023)
- "China in Your Hand" (Single from Gunship) (2024)
- "Outro" (from Bonginator's Retrodeath) (2025)
- "Light's Last Stand" (from The Protomen's Act III: This City Made Us) (2026)
- "Little Bird", from Better Angels of Our Nature by (Dust & Blood).

== Filmography ==
Film
Year	Title	Role	Notes
1987	The Lost Boys	Beach Concert Star	
1987	Hearts of Fire	Nico	
1989	Tap	Harry	Uncredited
1993	What's Love Got to Do with It	Keyboard Player	

Television
Year	Title	Role	Notes
1987	Miami Vice	Arzola	Episode: "Theresa"
1987	The Equalizer	Shopkeeper	Episode: "A Place to Stay"
1987	The Equalizer	Roadie	Episode: "Inner View"
2021	Worn Stories	Himself	
2022	Reservation Dogs	Himself	Episode: "I Still Believe"
2026	Scrubs	Himself	Episode: "My Halloween"
