= Worn Stories =

- Genre: Documentary
- Starring: Spirit Avedon; Timmy Cappello; Diane
- Country of origin: United States
- Original language: English
- No. of seasons: 1
- No. of episodes: 8

Production
- Running time: 28–31 minutes

Original release
- Network: Netflix
- Release: April 1, 2021

Worn Stories is a 2021 docuseries released on Netflix on April 1, 2021, starring Spirit Avedon, Timmy Cappello and Diane.

== Plot ==
"In this funny, heartfelt and moving docuseries, real people unpack the stories around their pieces of clothing."

== Cast ==
- Spirit Avedon
- Tim Cappello
- Diane
- Simon Doonan
- Patrice Jetter
- Aya Kanai
- Joann Matarazzo
- Emily Spivack
- Todd Bailey
- Daisy Cortes
- Emilie Lemakis
- Joe Passon
- Paul
- Shoham
- Ramadhan Sindi
- Marcy Spivack
- Heevi Abdullah
- Mike Africa Jr.
- Ian Chillag
- Jose Cortes
- Liandra
- Niecey Peace
- Frederica Wilson
- Debbie Africa
- Guadalupe Cortes
- Michael Massimino
- Mrs. Park
- Shivon
- Byron Wackwitz
- Antwan Williams
- Matt Caprioli (Frye-Castillo)
- Carlos Cervantes
- Zelda Fassler
- Maxayn Gooden
- Mazzerati
- Tom Turcich
- Tren'ness Woods-Black
- Rachael Baker
- Charo
- Ernie Glam
- David Pomeranz
- Savannah
- Amir Campbell
- Sal Gonzalez
- Skye Dee Miles
- T.J. Newton
- Ron Decar
- Hot Fries
- Ross Intelisano
- Rudy
- Cathy Turcich
- Annaleigh
- Ben Bostic
- Stan
- Mike Africa
- Heidi Vanderhoof

== Episodes ==
No.	Title	Directed by	Original release date
1	"Community"	Dara Horenblas	April 1, 2021
Clothing—or lack thereof—can bring people together, whether they're celebrating a life, shining on the dance floor or woodworking in the nude.
2	"Lost and Found"	Ted Passon	April 1, 2021
Loss hurts—and inspires. A codpiece is revived as a career rebounds. A stray coat leads to adventure while airbrushed tees memorialize the dead.
3	"Beginnings"	Dara Horenblas	April 1, 2021
Author Emily Spivack rediscovers the first thing she ever wore, but that's just the start of a look at origin stories and how clothing shapes a life.
4	"Growing Up"	Dara Horenblas	April 1, 2021
Gender-neutral b'nai mitzvah garb, football pants worn by a Kurdish American player, a sexy jockstrap for a writer—there's no one way to grow up.
5	"Uniform"	Claudia Woloshin	April 1, 2021
Protective, practical uniforms find new uses when a crossing guard refuses to be defined, an artist enjoys erasure, and a lawmaker proudly stands out.
6	"Chance"	Claudia Woloshin	April 1, 2021
Let it ride. These ladies are betting big in Las Vegas, tackling pro wrestling, showcasing Black nightlife and even glittering onstage as Charo.
7	"Survival"	Ted Passon	April 1, 2021
Designer leggings and a hoodie can be a matter of life and death when a creative recalls L.A.'s plague years and a dad hunts for signs of his dead son.
8	"Love"	Ted Passon	April 1, 2021
A Vegas singer embraces his inner Elvis, boots bring back a kicked-to-the-curb love, and a quilt patches up a family. Love is all sewn up in our duds.
