= Private Dancer =

- Cover photography by Peter Ashworth

Studio album by Tina Turner
- Released: May 29, 1984
- Recorded: 1983–1984
- Studios: Farmyard, Mayfair, Wessex, Good Earth, Abbey Road, CBS (London, United Kingdom)
- Genres: Pop; rock; R&B
- Length: 44:02
- Label: Capitol
- Producers: Terry Britten; Carter; Leon "Ndugu" Chancler; Wilton Felder; Rupert Hine; Joe Sample; Greg Walsh; Martyn Ware

Tina Turner chronology
Love Explosion (1979)	Private Dancer (1984)	Break Every Rule (1986)

US release
- Original US release cover

Singles from Private Dancer
- 1. "Let's Stay Together" Released: November 7, 1983 (UK); 2. "Help!" Released: February 13, 1984 (UK); 3. "What's Love Got to Do with It" Released: May 1984; 4. "Better Be Good to Me" Released: September 1984; 5. "Private Dancer" Released: October 1984 (EU); 6. "I Can't Stand the Rain" Released: February 1985 (UK); 7. "Show Some Respect" Released: April 1985 (US)

Private Dancer is the fifth solo studio album by singer Tina Turner. It was released on May 29, 1984, by Capitol Records and was her first album released by the label. After a challenging start to her solo career following her divorce from Ike Turner, Private Dancer propelled Turner into becoming a viable solo star, as well as one of the most marketable crossover singers in the recording industry. It became a worldwide commercial success, earning multi-platinum certifications, and remains her best-selling album in North America to date. In 2020, the album was selected by the Library of Congress for preservation in the National Recording Registry for being "culturally, historically, or aesthetically significant."

== Background and production ==
A&R man John Carter of Capitol Records is credited with relaunching Turner's career in the 1980s. In 1983, despite opposition from within Capitol, he signed her and managed her first album for the label, Private Dancer. Recording sessions were overseen by four different production teams, including Rupert Hine, and Martyn Ware of Heaven 17, and took place at several studios in England. A radical departure from the rhythm and blues sound Turner performed with Ike, the tracks in the album are a mixture of uptempos and ballads, inspired by pop and rock genres; it also features elements of smooth jazz and contemporary R&B.

Carter produced "Private Dancer", which was written by Mark Knopfler and has a guitar solo by Jeff Beck. "Let's Stay Together" was produced by Ware. Terry Britten produced the reggae-tinged "What's Love Got to Do with It". "Help!" was recorded with The Crusaders. Hine produced "Better Be Good to Me", which had been written by Holly Knight, Mike Chapman, and Nicky Chinn.

== Release & promotion ==
In 1997, EMI, the parent label of Capitol Records, released a digitally remastered Centenary Edition of the Private Dancer album on CD. This version includes four additional demo tracks recorded in late 1983 and early 1984 with producer Carter, first released as B-sides to some of the Private Dancer singles; it also includes three extended 12" remixes.

In 2015, the 30th Anniversary edition of this album was released by the Parlophone Records unit of Warner Music Group which now controls this album. On March 21, 2025, Parlophone released a five-disc and Blu-ray deluxe edition. The edition was preceded by the release of "Hot for You Baby," a previously undiscovered song from the Private Dancer sessions written by George Young and Harry Vanda.

=== Promotion ===
A 177 date tour to promote the album took place from February 8, 1985, to December 28, 1985. Called the Private Dancer Tour, there were 60 shows in Europe, 105 in North America, 10 in Australia, and 2 in Japan. Opening acts in North America included Glenn Frey and Mr. Mister. As well as songs from the album, Turner performed hits from her time with Ike & Tina, such as "River Deep – Mountain High", "Nutbush City Limits", and "Proud Mary".

== Critical reception ==
Professional ratings
Review scores
Source	Rating
AllMusic	4.5/5 stars
American Songwriter	5/5 stars
Christgau's Record Guide	A−
Goldmine	4/5 stars
Los Angeles Times	4/4 stars
Mojo	4/5 stars
Q	4/5 stars
Rolling Stone	4/5 stars
The Rolling Stone Album Guide	4/5 stars
The Sydney Morning Herald	3/5 stars

The album received a positive reception from critics. The Los Angeles Times wrote that Turner's voice "melts vinyl".

Debby Miller, in a July 1984 Rolling Stone review, felt that the album was a powerful comeback, with Turner's voice "rasping but strong", and a range of songs that were all good in a "modern rock setting" that was "neither detached nor very fussy". Robert Christgau of The Village Voice felt that she embraced the "middlebrow angst of contemporary professional songwriting". He said that "four different production teams" on the project was a "sign of desperation", despite the resulting "seamless authority" of the album.

== Legacy ==
Alex Henderson, in a retrospective AllMusic review, says that the album was slicker than her R&B classics recorded with Ike & Tina, but she was still able to sing with a throaty passion to deliver her finest solo production. Stephen Holden has written in The New York Times that by using her English producers to soften her raw Southern soul style, discarding the "blaring horns, frenzied percussion and gospel calls and responses", the album became a "landmark" in the "evolution of pop-soul music".

Michael Lydon, in Robert Dimery's 1001 Albums You Must Hear Before You Die, says that the album's lyrical themes embodied her persona of a "tough, sexy woman schooled in a tough world", and that her vocal delivery overcomes the slick production, with her "indomitable soul" unifying the multiple producers. In 1989, the album was ranked number 46 on Rolling Stone magazine's list of The 100 Greatest Albums of the '80s. In 2001, VH1 named Private Dancer the 95th greatest album of all time. Slant Magazine listed the album at number 63 on its list of "Best Albums of the 1980s", saying, "Both a personal liberation and sonic redemption, Private Dancer established Turner not only as a genuine diva, but a bona fide force of nature".

== Commercial performance ==
The album was released on May 29, 1984, and became an outstanding global commercial success. The album peaked at number three on the Billboard 200 chart for ten consecutive weeks and remained in the top ten for 39 weeks from August 1984 to May 1985. In the United States it was certified 5× platinum. In Germany, the album went 5× gold becoming one of the best selling albums in history. It peaked at number two on the UK Albums Chart, where it was certified 3× platinum, remaining on the charts for 150 total weeks. It was certified 7× platinum for the shipment of over 700,000 copies in Canada by the Canadian Recording Industry Association. The album has sold more than 12 million copies worldwide. At the 1985 Grammy Awards, Private Dancer won four of the six awards for which it was nominated.

== Track listing ==
=== US edition ===
Side one
No.	Title	Writer(s)	Producer(s)	Length
1.	"I Might Have Been Queen"	Jeanette Obstoj; Rupert Hine; Jamie West-Oram	Hine	4:10
2.	"What's Love Got to Do with It"	Terry Britten; Graham Lyle	Britten	3:48
3.	"Show Some Respect"	Britten; Sue Shifrin	Britten	3:18
4.	"I Can't Stand the Rain"	Ann Peebles; Don Bryant; Bernard Miller	Britten	3:41
5.	"Better Be Good to Me"	Holly Knight; Nicky Chinn; Mike Chapman	Hine	5:11

Side two
No.	Title	Writer(s)	Producer(s)	Length
6.	"Let's Stay Together"	Willie Mitchell; Al Green; Al Jackson Jr.	Greg Walsh; Martyn Ware	5:16
7.	"1984"	David Bowie	Walsh; Ware	3:09
8.	"Steel Claw"	Paul Brady	Carter	3:48
9.	"Private Dancer"	Mark Knopfler	Carter	7:11

=== International edition ===
No.	Title	Writer(s)	Producer(s)	Length
1.	"I Might Have Been Queen"	Obstoj; Hine; West-Oram	Hine	4:10
2.	"What's Love Got to Do with It"	Britten; Lyle	Britten	3:48
3.	"Show Some Respect"	Britten; Shifrin	Britten	3:18
4.	"I Can't Stand the Rain"	Peebles; Bryant; Miller	Britten	3:41
5.	"Private Dancer"	Knopfler	Carter	7:11
6.	"Let's Stay Together"	Mitchell; Green; Jackson, Jr.	Walsh; Ware	5:16
7.	"Better Be Good to Me"	Knight; Chinn; Chapman	Hine	5:11
8.	"Steel Claw"	Brady	Carter	3:48
9.	"Help!"	John Lennon; Paul McCartney	Joe Sample; Ndugu Chancler; Wilton Felder	4:30
10.	"1984"	Bowie	Walsh; Ware	3:09

=== 1997 Centenary Edition ===
No.	Title	Writer(s)	Producer(s)	Length
1.	"I Might Have Been Queen"	Obstoj; Hine; West-Oram	Hine	4:10
2.	"What's Love Got to Do with It"	Britten; Lyle	Britten	3:48
3.	"Show Some Respect"	Britten; Shifrin	Britten	3:18
4.	"I Can't Stand the Rain"	Peebles; Bryant; Miller	Britten	3:41
5.	"Private Dancer"	Knopfler	Carter	7:11
6.	"Let's Stay Together"	Mitchell; Green; Jackson, Jr.	Walsh; Ware	5:16
7.	"Better Be Good to Me"	Knight; Chinn; Chapman	Hine	5:11
8.	"Steel Claw"	Brady	Carter	3:48
9.	"Help!"	Lennon–McCartney	Sample; Chancler; Felder	4:30
10.	"1984"	Bowie	Walsh; Ware	3:09

Bonus tracks
No.	Title	Writer(s)	Producer(s)	Length
11.	"I Wrote a Letter"	Inga Rumpf	Carter	3:24
12.	"Rock 'n Roll Widow"	Tom Snow	Carter	4:45
13.	"Don't Rush the Good Things"	Neil Gammack	Carter	3:46
14.	"When I Was Young"	Eric Burdon; Victor Briggs; John Weider; Danny McCulloch	Carter	3:11
15.	"What's Love Got to Do with It" (Extended 12" Remix)	Britten; Lyle	Britten	5:48
16.	"Better Be Good to Me" (Extended 12" Remix) (edit)	Knight; Chinn; Chapman	Hine	7:03
17.	"I Can't Stand the Rain" (Extended 12" Remix)	Peebles; Bryant; Miller	Britten	5:45

=== 2015 30th Anniversary Edition ===
CD 1: Private Dancer Remastered
No.	Title	Writer(s)	Producers	Length
1.	"I Might Have Been Queen"	Obstoj; Hine; West-Oram	Hine	4:10
2.	"What's Love Got to Do with It"	Britten; Lyle	Britten	3:48
3.	"Show Some Respect"	Britten; Shifrin	Britten	3:18
4.	"I Can't Stand the Rain"	Peebles; Bryant; Miller	Britten	3:41
5.	"Private Dancer"	Knopfler	Carter	7:11
6.	"Let's Stay Together"	Mitchell; Green; Jackson, Jr.	Walsh; Ware	5:16
7.	"Better Be Good to Me"	Knight; Chinn; Chapman	Hine	5:11
8.	"Steel Claw"	Brady	Carter	3:48
9.	"Help!"	Lennon; McCartney	Sample; Chancler; Felder	4:30
10.	"1984"	Bowie	Walsh; Ware	3:09

CD 2
No.	Title	Writer(s)	Producers	Length
1.	"Ball of Confusion (That's What the World Is Today)" (with B.E.F.)	Barrett Strong; Norman Whitfield	Walsh; Ware	4:13
2.	"I Wrote a Letter"	Rumpf	Carter	3:24
3.	"Rock 'n Roll Widow"	Snow	Carter	4:45
4.	"Don't Rush the Good Things"	Gammack	Carter	3:46
5.	"When I Was Young"	Burdon; Briggs; Weider; McCulloch	Carter	3:11
6.	"Keep Your Hands Off My Baby"	Billy Steinberg; Tom Kelly	Carter	3:31
7.	"Tonight" (Live with David Bowie) (Live at The NEC, Birmingham)	Bowie; James Osterberg	Britten	4:01
8.	"Let's Pretend We're Married" (Live)	Prince	Britten	4:13
9.	"What's Love Got to Do with It" (Extended 12" Remix)	Britten; Lyle	Britten	5:45
10.	"Better Be Good to Me" (Extended 12" Remix) (edit)	Knight; Chinn; Chapman	Hine	7:04
11.	"I Can't Stand the Rain" (Extended 12" Remix)	Peebles; Bryant; Miller	Britten	5:43
12.	"Show Some Respect" (Extended Mix)	Britten; Shifrin	Britten	5:45
13.	"We Don't Need Another Hero (Thunderdome)" (Single Edit)	Britten	Britten; Lyle	4:16
14.	"One of the Living" (Single Remix)	Knight	Mike Chapman	4:13
15.	"It's Only Love" (with Bryan Adams)	Adams; Jim Vallance	Adams; Vallance; Bob Clearmountain	3:18

=== 2025 40th Anniversary Edition ===
CD 1: Private Dancer (2015 Remaster)
No.	Title	Writer(s)	Length
1.	"I Might Have Been Queen"	Obstoj; Hine; West-Oram	4:10
2.	"What's Love Got to Do with It"	Britten; Lyle	3:48
3.	"Show Some Respect"	Britten; Shifrin	3:18
4.	"I Can't Stand the Rain"	Peebles; Bryant; Miller	3:41
5.	"Private Dancer"	Knopfler	7:11
6.	"Let's Stay Together"	Mitchell; Green; Jackson, Jr.	5:16
7.	"Better Be Good to Me"	Knight; Chinn; Chapman	5:11
8.	"Steel Claw"	Brady	3:48
9.	"Help!"	Lennon; McCartney	4:30
10.	"1984"	Bowie	3:09

CD 2: B-sides, Single Edits & Extended Versions
No.	Title	Writer(s)	Length
1.	"I Wrote a Letter"	Rumpf	3:25
2.	"Rock 'n' Roll Widow"	Snow	4:41
3.	"Don't Rush the Good Things"	Gammack	3:46
4.	"When I Was Young"	Burdon; Briggs; Weider; McCulloch	3:08
5.	"Keep Your Hands Off My Baby"	Steinberg; Kelly	3:29
6.	"Let's Stay Together" (Single Edit)	Mitchell; Green; Jackson, Jr.	3:41
7.	"Help!" (Single Edit)	Lennon; McCartney	3:45
8.	"Better Be Good to Me" (Single Edit)	Knight; Chinn; Chapman	3:42
9.	"Private Dancer" (Single Edit)	Knopfler	4:02
10.	"What's Love Got to Do With It" (Extended 12" Remix)	Britten; Lyle	5:43
11.	"Better Be Good to Me" (Extended 12" Remix)	Knight; Chinn; Chapman	7:45
12.	"I Can't Stand the Rain" (Extended 12" Remix)	Peebles; Bryant; Miller	5:41
13.	"Show Some Respect" (Extended Mix)	Britten; Shifrin	5:43

CD 3: Previously Unreleased & Rare Tracks Plus Other Singles
No.	Title	Writer(s)	Length
1.	"Hot for You Baby"	George Young; Harry Vanda	4:43
2.	"Let's Stay Together" (Alternative Radio Mix, 1983)	Mitchell; Green; Jackson, Jr.	3:50
3.	"Let's Stay Together" (TV Instrumental)	Mitchell; Green; Jackson, Jr.	4:29
4.	"What's Love Got to Do With It" (Dub Mix)	Britten; Lyle	3:56
5.	"Private Dancer" (Sterling Version)	Knopfler	4:03
6.	"Total Control"	Jeff Jourard; Martha Davis	6:25
7.	"Ball of Confusion" (Remix)	Strong; Whitfield	4:11
8.	"We Don't Need Another Hero (Thunderdome)"	Britten; Lyle	4:15
9.	"One of the Living"	Knight	4:13
10.	"We Don't Need Another Hero (Thunderdome)" (Extended Remix)	Britten; Lyle	6:07
11.	"One of the Living" (Special Club Mix)	Knight	7:38
12.	"We Don't Need Another Hero (Thunderdome)" (Instrumental)	Britten; Lyle	6:33
13.	"One of the Living" (Dub Version)	Knight	5:12

CD4: World Tour ‘84 – Live at Park West, Chicago – August 2, 1984
No.	Title	Writer(s)	Length
1.	"Let's Pretend We're Married"	Prince	4:18
2.	"Show Some Respect"	Britten; Shifrin	3:48
3.	"I Might Have Been Queen"	Obstoj; Hine; West-Oram	3:44
4.	"River Deep, Mountain High"	Phil Spector; Jeff Barry; Ellie Greenwich	4:00
5.	"Nutbush City Limits"	Tina Turner	3:04
6.	"What's Love Got to Do With It"	Britten; Lyle	4:13
7.	"I Can't Stand the Rain"	Peebles; Bryant; Miller	3:43
8.	"Better Be Good to Me"	Knight; Chinn; Chapman	6:43
9.	"Private Dancer"	Knopfler	6:32
10.	"Let's Stay Together"	Mitchell; Green; Jackson, Jr.	8:03
11.	"Help!"	Lennon; McCartney	4:55
12.	"Proud Mary"	John Fogerty	8:00
13.	"Legs"	Billy Gibbons; Dusty Hill; Frank Beard	10:25

CD 5: Private Dancer Tour – Live From Nec, Birmingham 1984
No.	Title	Writer(s)	Length
1.	"Show Some Respect"	Britten; Sue Shifrin	3:43
2.	"I Might Have Been Queen"	Obstoj; Hine; West-Oram	3:45
3.	"What's Love Got to Do With It"	Britten; Lyle	3:58
4.	"I Can't Stand the Rain"	Peebles; Bryant; Miller	3:27
5.	"Better Be Good to Me"	Knight; Chinn; Chapman	6:33
6.	"Private Dancer"	Knopfler	6:19
7.	"Let's Stay Together"	Mitchell; Green; Jackson, Jr.	4:52
8.	"Help!"	Lennon; McCartney	5:25
9.	"It's Only Love" (Featuring Bryan Adams)	Adams; Vallance	5:31
10.	"Tonight" (Featuring David Bowie)	Bowie	4:18
11.	"Let's Dance, Version I" (Featuring David Bowie)	Jim Lee	1:04
12.	"Let's Dance, Version II" (Featuring David Bowie)	Bowie	4:15

Blu-ray
No.	Title	Length
1.	"Show Some Respect" (Live From NEC, Birmingham, 1985)
2.	"I Might Have Been Queen" (Live From NEC, Birmingham, 1985)
3.	"What's Love Got to Do With It" (Live From NEC, Birmingham, 1985)
4.	"I Can't Stand the Rain" (Live From NEC, Birmingham, 1985)
5.	"Better Be Good to Me" (Live From NEC, Birmingham, 1985)
6.	"Private Dancer" (Live From NEC, Birmingham, 1985)
7.	"Let's Stay Together" (Live From NEC, Birmingham, 1985)
8.	"Help!" (Live From NEC, Birmingham, 1985)
9.	"It's Only Love" (Live From NEC, Birmingham, 1985, featuring Bryan Adams)
10.	"Tonight" (Live From NEC, Birmingham, 1985, featuring David Bowie)
11.	"Let's Dance – Version I" (Live From NEC, Birmingham, 1985, featuring David Bowie)
12.	"Let's Dance – Version II" (Live From NEC, Birmingham, 1985, featuring David Bowie)
13.	"Let's Stay Together" (Promo video)
14.	"Help!" (Promo Video)
15.	"What's Love Got to Do With It" (Colour Version)
16.	"What's Love Got to Do With It" (B/W Version)
17.	"Better Be Good to Me" (Promo video)
18.	"Private Dancer" (Full Length Version)
19.	"Private Dancer" (Promo video)
20.	"Show Some Respect" (Promo video)

== Personnel ==
- Tina Turner – lead vocals (all tracks), background vocals (1, 7, 8)

Tracks 1 & 7 (produced by Rupert Hine)

- Rupert Hine – producer
- Stephen W. Tayler – engineer & mixing
- Cy Curnin – background vocals
- Rupert Hine – bass guitar, keyboards, percussion, programming, background vocals
- Trevor Morais – drums
- Jamie West-Oram – guitar

Tracks 2, 3 & 4 (produced by Terry Britten)

- Terry Britten – producer, guitar (2, 3, 4), background vocals (2, 3), bass (2), drum programming (2)
- John Hudson – engineer & mixing (2, 3, 4)
- Graham Broad – drums (4)
- Nick Glennie-Smith – keyboards (2, 3, 4)
- Graham Jarvis – Oberheim DX (2, 3)
- Billy Livsey – Yamaha DX7 synthesizer (2), keyboards (3)
- Simon Morton – percussion (2)
- Tessa Niles – background vocals

Tracks 5 & 8 (produced by John Carter)

- John Carter – producer, percussion (5)
- Humberto Gatica – remixing
- Alan Clark – keyboards (5, 8), percussion (5)
- Mel Collins – saxophone (5)
- Jullian Diggle – percussion (5)
- John Illsley – bass guitar
- Hal Lindes – guitar
- Jeff Beck – guitar
- Terry Williams – drums
- Richie Zito – guitar (8)

Tracks 6 & 10 (produced by Greg Walsh & Martyn Ware)

- Greg Walsh – producer & engineer
- Martyn Ware – producer
- Walter Samuel – engineer
- Gary Barnacle – saxophone (6)
- David Cullen – string arrangements (10)
- Glenn Gregory – background vocals
- Frank Ricotti – percussion (6)
- Ray Russell – guitar (6)
- Martyn Ware – programming, electronic drums, arrangements, background vocals
- Greg Walsh – programming, arrangements
- Nick Plytas – piano, synthesizer

Track 9 (produced by Leon "Ndugu" Chancler, Wilton Felder & Joe Sample)

- Leon "Ndugu" Chancler – drums, producer
- F. Byron Clark – engineer
- Wilton Felder – producer, bass guitar, saxophone
- Joe Sample – producer, synthesizer, piano
- Alex Brown – background vocals
- David Ervin – synthesizer, programming
- Gwen Evans – background vocals
- Charles Fearing – guitar
- David T. Walker – guitar
- Jessica Williams – background vocals

General

- Alan Yoshida – mastering
- Akira Taguchi – compilation producer
- Sam Gay – creative director
- Roy Kohara – art direction
- John O'Brien – design
- Peter Ashworth – photography
- Roger Davies – management
- Chip Lightman – management

== Charts ==
=== Weekly charts ===
1984 weekly chart performance for Private Dancer
Chart (1984)	Peak position
Australian Albums (Kent Music Report)	7
Austrian Albums (Ö3 Austria)	1
Canada Top Albums/CDs (RPM)	2
Canadian Albums (The Record)	1
Dutch Albums (Album Top 100)	3
European Albums (Music & Media)	1
Finnish Albums (Suomen virallinen lista)	5
German Albums (Offizielle Top 100)	2
New Zealand Albums (RMNZ)	2
Norwegian Albums (VG-lista)	5
Swedish Albums (Sverigetopplistan)	7
Swiss Albums (Schweizer Hitparade)	3
UK Albums (Official Charts)	2
US Billboard 200	3
US Top R&B/Hip-Hop Albums (Billboard)	1
US Cash Box Top Pop Albums	3

2023–2025 weekly chart performance for Private Dancer
Chart (2023–2025)	Peak position
Australian Albums (ARIA)	53
Belgian Albums (Ultratop Flanders)	34
Belgian Albums (Ultratop Wallonia)	149
Hungarian Albums (MAHASZ)	7
Portuguese Albums (AFP)	60

=== Year-end charts ===
1984 year-end chart performance for Private Dancer
Chart (1984)	Position
Australian Albums (Kent Music Report)	17
Canada Top Albums/CDs (RPM)	8
Dutch Albums (Album Top 100)	9
German Albums (Offizielle Top 100)	17
New Zealand Albums (RMNZ)	27
Norwegian Fall Period Albums (VG-lista)	6
Swiss Albums (Schweizer Hitparade)	6
UK Albums (Gallup)	18
US Billboard 200	39
US Top R&B/Hip-Hop Albums (Billboard)	11

1985 year-end chart performance for Private Dancer
Chart (1985)	Position
Australian Albums (Kent Music Report)	26
Austrian Albums (Ö3 Austria)	1
Canada Top Albums/CDs (RPM)	28
Dutch Albums (Album Top 100)	25
European Albums (Music & Media)	6
German Albums (Offizielle Top 100)	2
New Zealand Albums (RMNZ)	15
Swiss Albums (Schweizer Hitparade)	1
UK Albums (Gallup)	16
US Billboard 200	5
US Top R&B/Hip-Hop Albums (Billboard)	2

1986 year-end chart performance for Private Dancer
Chart (1986)	Position
UK Albums (Gallup)	78

== Certifications and sales ==
Certifications and sales for Private Dancer
Region	Certification	Certified units/sales
Australia (ARIA)	Platinum	200,000
Austria (IFPI Austria)	2× Platinum	100,000^{*}
Canada (Music Canada)	7× Platinum	800,000
Finland (Musiikkituottajat)	Gold	33,464
France (SNEP)	Gold	100,000^{*}
Germany (BVMI)	5× Gold	1,250,000^{^}
Netherlands (NVPI)	Platinum	100,000^{^}
New Zealand (RMNZ)	Platinum	15,000^{^}
Spain (Promusicae)	Platinum	100,000^{^}
Sweden (GLF)	Platinum	100,000^{^}
United Kingdom (BPI)	3× Platinum	900,000^{^}
United States (RIAA)	5× Platinum	5,000,000^{^}
Summaries
Europe	—	4,000,000
Worldwide	—	12,000,000
^{*} Sales figures based on certification alone.^{^} Shipments figures based on certification alone.

== Accolades ==
=== Grammy Awards ===
Year	Winner	Category
1985	"Better Be Good to Me"	Best Female Rock Vocal Performance
1985	"What's Love Got to Do with It"	Best Female Pop Vocal Performance
1985	"What's Love Got to Do with It?"	Record of the Year
1985	"What's Love Got to Do with It?"	Song of the Year

== See also ==
- List of best-selling albums in Germany
- List of best-selling albums by women
