= Show Some Respect =

Single by Tina Turner

from the album Private Dancer
- B-side: "Let's Pretend We're Married"
- Released: April 1985 (US)
- Recorded: 1983
- Studio: Mayfair Studios (London, England)
- Length: 3:18
- Label: Capitol
- Songwriters: Terry Britten; Sue Shifrin
- Producer: Terry Britten

Tina Turner singles chronology
"I Can't Stand The Rain" (1985)	"Show Some Respect" (1985)	"We Don't Need Another Hero (Thunderdome)" (1985)

Licensed audio
- "Show Some Respect (2015 Remaster)" on YouTube

"Show Some Respect" is a song recorded by recording artist Tina Turner. It was written by Terry Britten and Sue Shifrin and released as the sixth single from her fifth solo album Private Dancer (1984). While not released as a single in Europe, it found Top 40 success in the US by peaking at number 37 on the Billboard Hot 100 charts, and nearly made the Top 40 in Canada, peaking at number 42. The B-side to "Show Some Respect" is a live cover of Prince's song "Let's Pretend We're Married".

== Personnel ==
- Tina Turner – lead vocals
- Terry Britten – guitar, background vocals
- Nick Glennie-Smith, Billy Livsey – keyboards
- Tessa Niles – background vocals
- Graham Jarvis – drums

== Versions and remixes ==
- Album version - 3:18
- Extended 12" Remix - 5:47

== Charts ==
Chart (1985)	Peak position
Canada Top Singles (RPM)	42
New Zealand (Recorded Music NZ)	41
US Billboard Hot 100	37
US Hot R&B/Hip-Hop Songs (Billboard)	50
US Cash Box Top 100	38
