= Mad Max 2 (soundtrack) =

Mad Max 2 (Original Motion Picture Soundtrack)

Soundtrack album by Brian May
- Released: 1982; 25 October 1990 (CD release)
- Recorded: 1981; A.A.V. Australia, Melbourne
- Genre: Film music
- Length: 35:08
- Label: Varèse Sarabande
- Producers: Chris Kuchler, Tom Null

Brian May chronology
Race for the Yankee Zephyr (1981)	Mad Max 2 (Original Motion Picture Soundtrack) (1982)	Breakfast in Paris (1982)

Mad Max 2 (Original Motion Picture Soundtrack) is a soundtrack album for the 1981 film Mad Max 2, composed by Brian May. It was released on vinyl in the United States in 1982 by Varèse Sarabande, followed by a CD release on 25 October 1990.

== Overview ==
In 1981, composer Brian May reteamed with director George Miller and producer Byron Kennedy to write the music for Mad Max 2. Unlike the score for the previous film, May approached the music with a more legato and grandeur frame of reference. "It was an optimistic picture, and it was really like a modern revival of an old Western," said May. "Whereas in Mad Max I had a jagged brass, very atonal and difficult to play, in Mad Max 2 I had deep basses, cellos, and lots of short motifs that were not totally melodic but were just enough to be unified."

The score also bears resemblance to the Western genre, featuring a refined orchestra that differs from the first film. It is also often compared to "Mars, the Bringer of War" from Gustav Holst's orchestral suite The Planets.

The manuscripts of the orchestrated cues were later damaged in a flash flood, though some pages were saved by restoration experts. The music has since been released multiple times through various labels.

The original Varèse Sarabande album release from 1982 is presented with May's cues out of order and sometimes retitled; part of the track titled "Finale and Largo" is actually the main title, "Montage" was written for the truck chase scene (and as such would fit between "Break Out" and "Largo") and "Main Title" is actually the heard during the post-title montage. The sound effects suite that concludes the disc has two cues, "Boomerang Attack" and "Gyro Flight", that do not appear elsewhere on the album (the former is actually presented without any overlaying effects).

The soundtrack begins with the music for the "Montage/Main Title" sequence, which gives the back-story to the descent into war and chaos. The next selections accompany the action-packed sequences as Max and the settlers battle with the gang ("Confrontation"; "Marauder's Massacre", "Max Enters Compound"; "Gyro Saves Max"; and "Break Out"). The final tracks include the "Finale and Largo" and the "End Title" music, which is used while the narrator describes the settlers' escape to the coast to start a new life. The recording also includes a suite of special effects sounds, such as the Feral Kid's "Boomerang Attack"; "Gyro Flight"; "The Big Rig Starts"; "Breakout"; and the climactic effects for "The Refinery Explodes", when the booby-trapped oil refinery turns into a fireball.

== Reception ==
Professional ratings
Review scores
Source	Rating
AllMusic	3/5 stars
AVForms	8/10 stars
FilmMusic.pl	3/5 stars

The musical score received generally positive reviews. Chaz Kangas of City Pages wrote, "Seemingly with a much bigger orchestra and undoubtedly more resources to play with, one can't help but marvel at Mad Max 2's music. You could put it over stock footage of children's education films from the '50s and it would still make whatever you're watching feel legendary."

== Track listing ==
All music is composed by Brian May.

Side one
No.	Title	Length
1.	"Montage/Main Title"	4:53
2.	"Confrontation"	2:32
3.	"Marauder's Massacre"	3:13
4.	"Max Enters Compound"	4:08
5.	"Gyro Saves Max"	3:55
Total length:		18:41

Side two
No.	Title	Length
6.	"Break Out"	3:26
7.	"Finale and Largo"	5:06
8.	"End Title"	3:19
9.	"SFX Suite" (Boomerang Attack/Gyro Flight/The Big Rig Starts/Break Out/The Refinery Explodes/Reprise)	4:36
Total length:		16:27

== Expanded edition ==
Mad Max 2 (Expanded Motion Picture Soundtrack) is a bootleg featuring extended and alternate cues previously unreleased. Album cues from the original album are bolded in the following track listing.

No.	Title	Length
1.	"**Main Title***"	1:06
2.	"**Montage/First Chase***"	3:17
3.	"**Confrontation**"	3:00
4.	"Gyro Captain"	1:59
5.	"The Refinery"	1:40
6.	"**Marauders Massacre**"	3:13
7.	"**Max Enters the Compound**"	4:08
8.	"Close the Gate"	1:31
9.	"Wez Loses It"	1:24
10.	"Trek For Fuel"	2:50
11.	"**Gyro Flight****"	0:27
12.	"The Vengeance of Humungous"	2:28
13.	"The Leaving"	2:13
14.	"Interceptor Wrecked"	2:35
15.	"**Gyro Saves Max**"	3:55
16.	"**Break Out****"	3:25
17.	"The Chase Is On"	1:55
18.	"Papagallos Death"	0:23
19.	"U-Turn"	1:26
20.	"Collision/Finale"	4:00
21.	"End Title"	2:49
Total length:		49:54

* - Contains material that was present on the original soundtrack as "Montage/Main Title"
** - Contains material that was present on the original soundtrack as "SFX Suite"

== Personnel ==
Production

- Brian May – composer, conductor
- Chris Kuchler – producer
- Tom Null – producer
- Scot Holton – executive producer
- John Sievers – executive producer
- Daniel Hersch – editor, engineer
- Roger Savage – recording engineer
- Bruce Leek – mastering engineer
- Mike Malan – production coordinator
- Karen Store – production coordinator

== Additional music ==
Additional music featured in Mad Max 2:

Title	Writer(s)	Key Scenes/Notes
"Happy Birthday to You"	Patty Hill, Mildred J. Hill	Plays from the music box that Max finds in the vehicle wreckage at the beginning of the film.
