= Mad Max (soundtrack) =

Mad Max (Original Motion Picture Soundtrack)

Soundtrack album by Brian May
- Released: 1980; 26 October 1993 (CD release)
- Genre: Film music
- Length: 31:25
- Label: Varèse Sarabande
- Producer: Scot Holton

Brian May chronology
Patrick (1978)	Mad Max (Original Motion Picture Soundtrack) (1980)	Snapshot (1979)

Mad Max (Original Motion Picture Soundtrack) is a soundtrack album for the 1979 film Mad Max, composed by Brian May. It was released on vinyl in the United States in 1980 by Varèse Sarabande, followed by a CD release on 26 October 1993.

== Overview ==
Composer Brian May won the assignment of composing the music for Mad Max. " when director George Miller and producer Byron Kennedy met at director Richard Franklin's house for dinner one evening and played two of May's score for his then-upcoming film Patrick (1978). At the time, both directors and the producer were looking for a score that resembled the works of Bernard Herrmann and specifically what Bernard Herrmann and Co. did in Hitchcock films," In his own words; "because they had a big action movie and they needed a score to propel it along and give it a lot of bite and energy.

Combining classical orchestration with mechanical sounds, May's work on Mad Max is notable for its distinctive soundscape that interacts with the film's diegetic sounds. "Mad Max was a strongly energized score in the violence/action department, and for that they wanted a totally non-melodic score," explained May. "It was very jagged and shearing, and George particularly wanted me to antagonize the audience by making them feel uncomfortable. Sometimes we had jagged notes going against dialog so that the audience would feel frustrated." Such effects were developed through the application of stingers by way of brass and percussion instruments.

May went on to win the Australian Film Award for Best Original Score for his work on Mad Max.

== Reception ==
Professional ratings
Review scores
Source	Rating
AllMusic	4.5/5 stars
AVForms	9/10 stars
GoldenScore	3/4 stars

The musical score for Mad Max has received generally positive reviews. Quentin Billard of GoldenScore called it "one of the most impressive symphonic scores of Brian May", adding, "The darkness and brutality of his music for the film [...] accentuates the constant unease throughout the film."

In a retrospective review, Paul Andrew MacLean of Film Score Monthly wrote, "May's score lent incalculable scope to the film, making it larger and more furious. Coupled with furiously staccato writing and Stravinskian time signatures, the result was a strident, metallic score, perfectly underscoring the film's barbarous, high-velocity car culture." Chris McEneany, writing for AVForms, similarly praised the soundtrack, describing it as "often harsh, wild and blood-curdling". He later added, "Far more narratively structured than the two scores that followed in the Mad Max Trilogy, but no less violent, ballsy, headlong and rubber-burning, this is a classic thriller score from an era that was the change."

== Track listing ==
All music is composed by Brian May.

Side one
No.	Title	Length
1.	"Main Title"	2:03
2.	"Max the Hunter"	2:10
3.	"Max Decides On Vengeance"	2:40
4.	"The Final Chase"	1:47
5.	"The Terrible Death of Jim Goose"	1:02
6.	"We'll Give 'Em Back Their Heroes"	1:13
7.	"Pain and Triumph"	2:15
8.	"Dazed Goose"	0:35
9.	"Foreboding in the Vast Landscape"	2:08
Total length:		15:53

Side two
No.	Title	Length
10.	"Declaration of War"	1:30
11.	"Flight from the Evil Toecutter"	2:25
12.	"Pursuit and Tragedy"	1:55
13.	"Jesse Alone, Uneasy and Exhausted"	1:40
14.	"The Beach House"	1:55
15.	"The Nightrider Rave"	1:20
16.	"Jesse Searches for Her Child"	0:55
17.	"Rampage of the Toecutter"	1:47
18.	"The Crazing of Johnny the Boy"	2:05
Total length:		15:32

Bonus track (1993 CD release)
No.	Title	Length
19.	"Outtakes Suite" (in 5 parts; indexed)	6:00
Total length:		37:25

== Personnel ==
Production

- Brian May – composer, conductor
- Roger Savage – recording engineer
- Richard Simpson – mastering engineer
- Rick Goldman – plating
- Jason Alexander – production coordinator
- Scot Holton – producer (Varèse Sarabande)
- Chris Kuchler – executive producer
- Tom Null – executive producer
- John Acoca – editor, preparation (1993 CD)
- William Stout – cover art director
- Bill Garland – cover illustrator (US edition)
- John Hamagami – cover illustrator (international edition)

== Additional music ==
Additional music featured in Mad Max:

Title	Musician(s)	Key Scenes/Notes
"Licorice Road"	Nicco Gazzana	Performed in the nightclub by actress Robina Chaffey; the vocal track was sung by Creenagh St. Clair. Gazzana also plays a member of Toecutter's gang.
"Jessie's Theme"	Nicco Gazzana	Performed by Joanne Samuel as her character plays the saxophone for her family.
"Rocker"	AC/DC	Spoken by Nightrider over the CB radio.
"Rollin' into the Night"	Akira Kushida	Replaced May's score during the end credits of the original Japanese release. An EP was released in Japan featuring both the standard version of the song as well as an instrumental version.
