= Mad Max (1990 video game) =

- Developers: Gray Matter; Eastridge Technology
- Publisher: Mindscape
- Designer: Chris Gray
- Programmer: Nick Eastridge
- Artist: Nick Gray
- Composer: Rich Shemaria
- Platform: NES
- Release: NA: July 1990
- Genre: Action
- Mode: Single-player

Mad Max is a post-apocalyptic action game developed by Canadian studio Gray Matter and published by Mindscape for the Nintendo Entertainment System in 1990. The game is based on the 1981 Australian film Mad Max 2.

== Gameplay ==
The object is to survive in a post-apocalyptic setting by battling raiders and collecting valuable food, water, gasoline, and money in order to continue racing into the desert wasteland that lies beyond.

The player begins the game in Max's Pursuit Special. As the player drives through the non-linear stage (referred to as a Road War), they encounter enemy vehicles, roadblocks, and dynamite-hurling bunkers. The player is given a very limited supply of dynamite to be used on these threats by throwing it directly at them. In each level, a small, run-down service station can be found, offering goods such as fuel and dynamite, as well as auto repair services in exchange for food and water.

The main goal of each level is to enter the arena and battle the enemy gangs. The player must gather enough food and water to trade at the service station for an Arena Pass. Once the pass is obtained, the player must find the Arena, which appears as a large cave. Once inside the arena, the player must be the last vehicle to survive the demolition derby inside. Enemy vehicles drive around the arena and attempt to push the player, as well as each other, off of the road into the abyss below. In addition, several areas of the floor open up at random, leaving vehicles to fall into the pitfall. Once all enemy vehicles are destroyed, the player advances to the next Road War level of the game.

Scattered throughout the levels are abandoned mines, marked by a small shed. By driving into the shed, Max will leave his vehicle and enter the mine. While inside the mine, Max may explore the area in a pseudo-3D environment. Food, water, fuel, and ammunition may be found inside the mines. Enemy survivalists are also present inside the mine, and will protect the items found within, however Max is armed with a shotgun, which also has limited ammo. Additional ammo may be found inside the mine.

After the third and final arena battle, the player engages in a one-on-one crossbow battle with the final boss of the game. The crossbow and ammo are both collected within the mines on the third Road War level. If the player wishes to start here, they must enter the password for the last Road War, rather than the final arena battle. If the player enters the password for the final arena battle, the player will not have enough crossbow ammo to kill the final boss, even if every single one hits him. It is unknown whether this was an untested bug in the game, or if it was a trick by the game developers.
