= We Don't Need Another Hero (Thunderdome) =

1985 single by Tina Turner

Single by Tina Turner

from the album Mad Max Beyond Thunderdome
- Released: July 8, 1985
- Recorded: December 1984
- Studio: Mayfair Studios (London, England)
- Genre: Pop rock
- Length: 6:07
- Label: Capitol
- Songwriters: Graham Lyle; Terry Britten
- Producer: Terry Britten

Tina Turner singles chronology
"Show Some Respect" (1985)	"We Don't Need Another Hero (Thunderdome)" (1985)	"One of the Living" (1985)

"We Don't Need Another Hero (Thunderdome)" is a song written by Graham Lyle and Terry Britten. It was recorded by American singer Tina Turner for the soundtrack album to the 1985 film Mad Max Beyond Thunderdome, which starred Mel Gibson and Turner. On the heels of Turner's multiplatinum album Private Dancer (1984), the song was released as an edited 7-inch single, while the full album version was released as a 12-inch single and on the film's soundtrack album. In the United Kingdom, a shaped picture disc was also issued. The power ballad received a Golden Globe Award nomination for Best Original Song and a Grammy Award nomination for Best Female Pop Vocal Performance. In 1986, the song received the Ivor Novello Awards for Best Contemporary Song and Best Film Theme or Song.

== Recording ==
Turner was backed by a choral group from King's House School in Richmond, London. One of the choir members who appeared on the recording, Lawrence Dallaglio, became famous as a rugby union star and captain of the England national team.

== Chart performance ==
"We Don't Need Another Hero (Thunderdome)" became one of Turner's biggest hit singles. It peaked at number two on September 14, 1985, on the US Billboard Hot 100, behind John Parr's "St. Elmo's Fire (Man in Motion)". It peaked at number three on the UK Singles Chart and topped the charts in Australia, Canada, Poland, Spain, Switzerland and West Germany.

== Music video ==
The accompanying music video for "We Don't Need Another Hero (Thunderdome)" features Turner dressed in her Aunty Entity costume from the Mad Max film, a heavy chain mail gown. As several spotlights shine on her, she proceeds to sing atop a platform while various scenes from the film are interspersed. In the last portion of the video, Turner is accompanied by a children's choir and Tim Cappello, her tour saxophonist, percussionist and keyboardist at the time. The music video received an MTV Video Music Award nomination for Best Female Video.

== Charts ==
=== Weekly charts ===
Chart (1985–1986)	Peak position
Australia (Kent Music Report)	1
Austria (Ö3 Austria Top 40)	2
Belgium (Ultratop 50 Flanders)	3
Canada Retail Singles (The Record)	1
Canada Top Singles (RPM)	1
Canada Adult Contemporary (RPM)	1
Europe (European Top 100)	4
Finland (Suomen virallinen lista)	4
France (SNEP)	3
Ireland (IRMA)	2
Italy (Musica e dischi)	2
Netherlands (Dutch Top 40)	7
Netherlands (Single Top 100)	7
New Zealand (Recorded Music NZ)	2
Norway (VG-lista)	2
Portugal (Musica & Som)	2
South Africa (Springbok Charts)	9
Spain (AFYVE)	1
Sweden (Sverigetopplistan)	4
Switzerland (Schweizer Hitparade)	1
UK Singles (Official Charts)	3
US Billboard Hot 100	2
US Adult Contemporary (Billboard)	3
US Dance Club Songs (Billboard)	23
US Hot R&B/Hip-Hop Songs (Billboard)	3
US Mainstream Rock (Billboard)	29
West Germany (GfK)	1
US Cash Box Top 100	3

Chart (2022)	Peak position
Poland Airplay (ZPAV)	90

=== Year-end charts ===
Chart (1985)	Position
Australia (Kent Music Report)	20
Austria (Ö3 Austria Top 40)	11
Belgium (Ultratop 50 Flanders)	10
Canada Top Singles (RPM)	12
Netherlands (Dutch Top 40)	31
New Zealand (RIANZ)	24
Norway Summer Period (VG-lista)	2
Spain (AFYVE)	14
Switzerland (Schweizer Hitparade)	6
UK Singles (OCC)	43
US Billboard Hot 100	57
US Adult Contemporary (Billboard)	26
US Hot Black Singles (Billboard)	49
West Germany (Media Control)	6

== Certifications ==
Region	Certification	Certified units/sales
Canada (Music Canada)	Gold	50,000^{^}
Germany (BVMI)	Gold	500,000^{^}
New Zealand (RMNZ)	Gold	15,000^{‡}
United Kingdom (BPI)	Gold	400,000^{‡}
^{^} Shipments figures based on certification alone.^{‡} Sales+streaming figures based on certification alone.

== Cover versions ==
In March 2016, Seal and Jencarlos Canela performed a cover of the song during the Fox television special The Passion. In the narrative, Pontius Pilate (Seal) is torn at sentencing Jesus (Jencarlos) to death; the lyrics were amended to remove the reference to Thunderdome, which was replaced with "the love we know".

In the thirteenth episode of Season Three of Riverdale (American TV series), Ashleigh Murray covers the song as her character Josie McCoy.

On May 19, 2023, Swedish rock band Ghost released a version of the song on their Phantomime covers EP.
