= Adam Cockburn (actor) =

Australian former child actor

- Born: Australia
- Occupations: Actor, disc jockey
- Years active: 1984–1992

Adam Cockburn is an Australian former child actor and DJ who appeared in feature films made in the 1980s and in TV series aired in the early 1990s. In July 1986 he took the role of the boy apprentice (John) in the Australian Opera production of Benjamin Britten's Peter Grimes for eight performances at the Sydney Opera House. In August of the following year he was Tsarevitch Alexis in the musical theatre version of Rasputin the Musical Revolution at the State Theatre. Cockburn later worked as a disc jockey.

== Filmography ==
Year	Title	Role	Notes
1984	Starship	School child	aka Lorca and the Outlaws
1985	Mad Max Beyond Thunderdome	Jedediah Jr.	
1987	Scuff the Sock	Alistair	TV movie
1987	The Right Hand Man	Violet Head	Based on The Right-Hand Man
1990	The Girl from Tomorrow	Mate No. 2 / Greg's Mate	TV Series, two episodes
1991	A Country Practice – "The Hunt"	Ian Watson	TV Series, two episodes
1992	The Girl Who Came Late	School Bully	aka Daydream Believer
1992	The Girl from Tomorrow		TV movie, (final film role)
