= One of the Living =

Single by Tina Turner

from the album Mad Max Beyond Thunderdome
- Released: September 13, 1985
- Recorded: 1985
- Studio: Cherokee Studios (Hollywood, California)
- Genre: Hard rock
- Length: 5:58
- Label: Capitol
- Songwriter: Holly Knight
- Producer: Mike Chapman

Tina Turner singles chronology
"We Don't Need Another Hero (Thunderdome)" (1985)	"One of the Living" (1985)	"It's Only Love" (1985)

"One of the Living" is a song written by Holly Knight and produced by Mike Chapman. It was recorded by American singer Tina Turner for the soundtrack album to the 1985 film Mad Max Beyond Thunderdome, which starred Mel Gibson and Turner. It was one of two songs which Turner recorded for the film, the other being "We Don't Need Another Hero (Thunderdome)".

"One of the Living" was released as the album's second single and reached number 15 on the US Billboard Hot 100, spending a total of 18 weeks on the chart. Elsewhere, it peaked at number 18 in Canada, number 15 in Ireland, number ten in the Netherlands and number nine in Switzerland. "One of the Living" won the Grammy Award for Best Female Rock Vocal Performance at the 28th Annual Grammy Awards.

== Recording ==
"One of the Living" features Device and Tim Cappello. Along with performing keyboards and background vocals, Holly Knight wrote and composed the song. Knight also co-wrote Turner's hit singles "Better Be Good to Me" and "The Best". Gene Black played guitars and performed background vocals. The saxophone solo was performed by Cappello. Device's frontman Paul Engemann did not participate on the project.

== Official versions/remixes ==
- Album version – 5:58
- 7" remix – 4:10
- 7" dub version – 4:45
- 12" special club mix – 7:35
- 12" dub – 4:56
- 12" instrumental – 5:58

== Charts ==
=== Weekly charts ===
Chart (1985)	Peak position
Australia (Kent Music Report)	34
Austria (Ö3 Austria Top 40)	12
Belgium (Ultratop 50 Flanders)	7
Canada Top Singles (RPM)	18
Europe (European Top 100)	23
Finland (Suomen virallinen lista)	9
Ireland (IRMA)	15
Netherlands (Dutch Top 40)	10
Netherlands (Single Top 100)	13
New Zealand (Recorded Music NZ)	24
Switzerland (Schweizer Hitparade)	9
UK Singles (Official Charts)	55
US Billboard Hot 100	15
US Dance Club Songs (Billboard)	6
US Hot R&B/Hip-Hop Songs (Billboard)	41
West Germany (Official German Charts)	6
US Cash Box Top 100	16
