= Mad Max Beyond Thunderdome =

1985 Australian post-apocalyptic action film

- Theatrical release poster by Richard Amsel
- Directed by: George Miller; George Ogilvie
- Written by: Terry Hayes; George Miller
- Based on: Characters by: George Miller; Byron Kennedy
- Produced by: George Miller
- Starring: Mel Gibson; Tina Turner
- Cinematography: Dean Semler
- Edited by: Richard Francis-Bruce
- Music by: Maurice Jarre
- Production company: Kennedy Miller Productions
- Distributed by: Warner Bros. (through Roadshow Film Distributors)
- Release date: 10 July 1985
- Running time: 107 minutes
- Country: Australia
- Language: English
- Budget: $10 million
- Box office: $36 million (rentals)

Mad Max Beyond Thunderdome is a 1985 Australian post-apocalyptic dystopian action film directed by George Miller and George Ogilvie and written by Terry Hayes and Miller. The third installment in the Mad Max franchise and the sequel to Mad Max 2 (1981), the film stars Mel Gibson (in his final performance as "Mad Max" Rockatansky) and Tina Turner. Billboard later listed Turner's performance in the film as the 68th best performance of a musician in a box-office film.

Mad Max Beyond Thunderdome was released in Australia on 10 July 1985. The film received positive reviews from critics. Due to its toned-down violence compared to previous and subsequent films, Beyond Thunderdome is the only film in the franchise to be rated PG-13 by the MPAA. A fourth film, Mad Max: Fury Road, was released in 2015, starring Tom Hardy as Max.

== Plot ==
The world is a post-apocalyptic wasteland caused by ecocide and a nuclear war over resources. (Note: As depicted in Mad Max 2 (1981)) In Mainland Australia, Max Rockatansky crosses the desert in a carriage pulled by a team of camels. The airborne bandit Jedediah and his young son attack him and steal his vehicle and animals. Max follows Jedediah's trail to a trading post called "Bartertown". Initially refused entry because he has nothing to trade, he impresses the local officials with his toughness, and the founder and ruler of the town, Aunty Entity, offers to resupply him if he completes a task.

Bartertown's energy comes from "Underworld," a subterranean refinery that turns pig feces into methane. The refinery is run by Master, a dwarf who rides around on Blaster, his giant bodyguard. "Master Blaster" has begun to challenge Aunty for control of Bartertown; Aunty wants Max to kill Blaster so she can subvert Master to her will.

Max infiltrates Underworld to size up Master Blaster and befriends Pig Killer, a convict sentenced to work there for slaughtering a pig to feed his children. When Master Blaster learns his newly-acquired vehicle belonged to Max, he forces Max to disarm its booby-trap. In doing so, Max sets off his alarm and discovers that Blaster is hypersensitive to high-pitched noises.

By law, conflicts in Bartertown are resolved by a fight to the death in Thunderdome, a gladiatorial arena. Max publicly accuses Master of stealing his vehicle, and a battle is scheduled against Blaster. Blaster dominates until Max blows a whistle, which makes Blaster grab his head in pain. Max knocks Blaster's helmet off and prepares to kill him, but relents upon seeing that Blaster has an intellectual disability. Max reveals Aunty's plot and Master threatens to shut down the refinery, so Aunty has Blaster killed. She is then able to terrorize Master into keeping the refinery running.

For breaking a deal, Max plays "Bust a Deal, Face the Wheel" where he lands on "Gulag". Max is bound, placed on a horse, and sent into the Wasteland. When the horse collapses from exhaustion, Max frees himself and continues on foot until he also collapses.

Warrior girl Savannah Nix finds Max near death and heals him. Her home "Planet Erf" is an oasis populated by a primitive tribe of teenagers and children known as the "Waiting Ones". The children are descended from survivors of a crashed Qantas Boeing 747, some of whom left to seek help and never returned. They believe Max is the pilot, "Captain Walker", come to fix the aeroplane and fly them to the fabled "Tomorrow-morrow Land". Max denies he is Walker and insists there is no longer any civilisation like that in their stories. Disillusioned, some teenagers and children led by Savannah want to attempt the journey to Bartertown, but Max stops them and has them tied up, saying everyone should go on living in the oasis.

During the night, the separatists escape. Max agrees to bring them back, taking some members of the tribe along. However, both parties are in bad shape by the time he catches up. Out of supplies, Max is forced to lead the contingent back to Bartertown.

The combined group sneaks into Underworld. With Pig Killer's help, the combined group frees Master and escapes in a modified truck along train tracks, destroying the refinery and most of Bartertown in the process. Aunty orders her forces to pursue and retrieve Master. Max and his group do their best to fight off the attackers. They come across Jedediah and his son, whom Max coerces into providing a ride in their aeroplane. With the approach of Aunty's army shortening the runway, Max gets in his vehicle which a child stole from their pursuers and crashes it into the oncoming attackers to create an opening so the plane can take off. Injured and alone, Max is spared by an impressed Aunty who leaves to rebuild Bartertown.

Jedediah flies Master, Pig Killer, and the separatists to the sand-covered ruins of Sydney. Years later, they have established a community with other wanderers. While they attempt to rediscover the knowledge of the pre-apocalyptic world, each night Savannah recites the story of their journey and they light up the city as a beacon for Max or any other travellers to follow. Meanwhile, Max wanders in the Wasteland alone.

== Cast ==
- Mel Gibson as "Mad Max" Rockatansky, a lone warrior who was an MFP (Main Force Patrol) officer before the collapse of society. Aided by his small pet monkey, he roves the desert Wasteland aimlessly.

The rest of the cast were listed under these categories in the end credits:

The Flying Jalopy

- Bruce Spence as Jedediah, the marauding pilot of a small plane, who trades stolen goods in Bartertown. Spence previously played "The Gyro Captain" in Mad Max 2.
- Adam Cockburn as Jedediah Jr., the son of Jedediah

The People of Bartertown

- Tina Turner as Aunty Entity, the ruthless yet determined ruler of Bartertown.
- Frank Thring as The Collector, a Bartertown inhabitant who runs Bartertown's trade and exchange network.
- Angelo Rossitto as The Master, a diminutive former-engineer of Bartertown's Underworld who used his technical expertise to build the methane extractor responsible for Bartertown's electricity.
- Paul Larsson as The Blaster, Master's enormous, silent bodyguard who is revealed to have an intellectual disability.
- Angry Anderson as Ironbar Bassey, the head of Bartertown's security and Aunty's top henchman.
- Robert Grubb as Pig Killer, a convict in Bartertown sentenced to shovel pig feces in Underworld's methane refinery for the crime of killing a pig to feed his children.
- George Spartels as Blackfinger, the head mechanic in Underworld.
- Edwin Hodgeman as Dr. Dealgood, Bartertown's flamboyant auctioneer and magistrate who also serves as Thunderdome's master of ceremonies.
- Bob Hornery as Waterseller, a man who tries to sell Max radioactive water in Bartertown only for Max to use a geiger counter on that water barrel.
- Andrew Oh as Ton Ton Tattoo, a Bartertown inhabitant who is Aunty's saxophone player.
- Ollie Hall, Susan Leonard, Ray Turnbull, Lee Rice, Robert Simper, Brian Ellison, Gerard Armstrong, Max Worrall, and Geeling as Aunty Entity's guards

The Tribe Who Left

- Helen Buday as Savannah Nix, a girl who is one of the oldest members of an isolated primitive tribe of teenager/child survivors of a plane crash (or the children of those survivors). She and Slake ensure the tribe remembers its oral tradition through "Tells" (recitations of their mythical origin and salvation narrative).
- Mark Spain as Mr. Skyfish, a child who flies a feathered kite.
- Mark Kounnas as Gekko, a child.
- Rod Zuanic as Scrooloose, a mute and alienated teenager who paints his face white with black around the eyes. He's the outcast of the Planet Erf tribe. Scrooloose can replicate anyone else's skills, including driving a vehicle.
- Justine Clarke as Anna Goanna, the child who first tells Max that Savannah and the others have escaped into the Wasteland to try to make it to Bartertown.
- Shane Tickner as Eddie, the smallest child who later catches up and joins the rescue party.
- Toni Allaylis as "Cusha... the pregnant girl".
- James Wingrove as Tubba Tintye, the hunter sent with Max and Anna Goanna.
- Adam Scougall as Finn McCoo, the child who is the first to hear Savannah when she initially returns with Max.

The Tribe Who Stayed

- Tom Jennings as Slake M'Thirst, the leader of the Planet Erf tribe and the largest of the tribespeople.
- Gerry D'Angelo, Travis Latter, Miguel Lopez, and Paul Daniel as the Hunters
- Tushka Hose, Emily Stocker, and Sandy Lillingston as the Guardians
- Adam Willits as Mr. Scratch
- Ben Chesterman, Liam Nikkinen, Dan Chesterman, Christopher Norton, Katharine Cullen, Heilan Robertson, Gabriel Dilworth, Hugh Sands, Rebekah Elmaloglou, Marion Sands, Shari Flood, Kate Tatar, Rachael Graham, Pega Williams, Emma Howard, Tarah Williams, Joanna McCarrol, Daniel Willits, Toby Messiter, and Tonya Wright as the Gatherers
- Charlie Kenney, Amanda Nikkinen, Flynn Kenney, Nick Panic, William Manning, James Robertson, Adam McCreadie, and Sally Morton as the Little Ones

== Production ==
Beyond Thunderdome was the first Mad Max film made without producer Byron Kennedy, who had been killed in a helicopter crash in 1983. Director George Miller was hesitant to continue without his producing partner, saying later: "I was reluctant to go ahead. And then there was a sort of need to – let's do something just to get over the shock and grief of all of that." There is a title card at the end of film before the credits roll that reads: "...for Byron".

Miller co-directed the film with George Ogilvie, with whom he had worked on the 1983 television miniseries The Dismissal. About this decision, he said: "I had a lot on my plate. I asked my friend George Ogilvie, who was working on the mini-series, 'Could you come and help me?' But I don't remember the experience because I was doing it to just... You know, I was grieving." For the film, Miller and Ogilvie employed a group workshopping rehearsal technique that they had developed.

Exterior location filming took place primarily in the mining town of Coober Pedy, though the set for Bartertown was built at an old brickworks (the Brickpit) at Homebush Bay in Sydney's western suburbs, and the children's camp was in the Blue Mountains. According to cinematographer Dean Semler, "Mad Max Beyond Thunderdome proved far more challenging than Mad Max 2. We were dealing with more varied environments than before and it was essential that each of the worlds created for the film have a distinctly different look."

It was the most expensive Australian film at the time.

== Music ==
The musical score for Beyond Thunderdome was composed by Maurice Jarre, replacing Brian May, who composed the music for the first two films in the series. The film also contains two songs performed by Tina Turner: "One of the Living", which plays over the opening titles, and "We Don't Need Another Hero (Thunderdome)", which plays over the end credits.

"We Don't Need Another Hero (Thunderdome)" reached #1 in Canada, #2 in the US, and #3 on the British single charts. "One of the Living" was rerecorded for single release, and it reached #15 in both Canada and the US, but only #55 in Britain. At the 28th Annual Grammy Awards, "One of the Living" won the award for Best Female Rock Vocal Performance.

A soundtrack album was released by Capitol Records in 1985. It included Turner's songs alongside an instrumental version of "We Don't Need Another Hero (Thunderdome)" on Side 1, and some of Jarre's music on Side 2. A double CD containing only Jarre's original music was issued in 2010 on Tadlow Music/Silva Screen Records.

== Reception ==
=== Box office ===
Although the film's budget was larger than that of its predecessors, its box office yield was only moderate in comparison. It grossed A$4,272,802 at the Australian box office, less than what Mad Max made and less than half of what Mad Max 2 made.

In the United States and Canada, the film grossed $36 million, generating theatrical rentals of $18 million. Outside of the U.S. (including Australia), it earned a similar amount, giving it worldwide rentals of $36 million.

=== Critical response ===
Reaction to the film was positive. On the review aggregator website Rotten Tomatoes, 80% of 59 critics' reviews are positive, with an average rating of 6.5/10. The website's consensus reads: "Beyond Thunderdome deepens the Mad Max character without sacrificing the amazing vehicle choreography and stunts that made the originals memorable." Metacritic, which uses a weighted average, assigned the film a score of 71 out of 100, based on 18 critics, indicating "generally favorable" reviews.

Critics disagreed over whether they considered the film to be the highest or lowest point of the Mad Max trilogy. Most criticism focused on the children in the second half of the film, whom many found too similar to the Lost Boys from the story of Peter Pan. Robert C. Cumbow of Slant Magazine identified "whole ideas, themes and characterizations" adopted from Riddley Walker, a 1980 post-apocalyptic novel by Russell Hoban.

On the other hand, there was much praise for the concept of the titular Thunderdome, which Roger Ebert of the Chicago Sun-Times called "the first really original movie idea about how to stage a fight since we got the first karate movies" and "one of the great creative action scenes in the movies". Ebert awarded the film four out of four stars and later placed it on his list of the ten best films of 1985. Variety wrote that the film "opens strong" and has good acting from Gibson, Turner, and the children.

Some fans of the series have criticised the film for being "Hollywood-ized" and having a lighter tone than its predecessors.

=== Accolades ===
Year	Association	Category	Nominated work	Result	Ref.
1985	Golden Globe Award	Best Original Song	"We Don't Need Another Hero"	Nominated	
1986	Grammy Award	Best Female Rock Vocal Performance	"One of the Living"	Won	
1986	Saturn Award	Best Science Fiction Film		Nominated	
1986	Saturn Award	Best Director	George Miller	Nominated	
1986	Saturn Award	Best Writing	George Miller and Terry Hayes	Nominated	
1986	Saturn Award	Best Costume Design	Norma Moriceau	Nominated	
1986	NAACP Image Award	Outstanding Actress in a Motion Picture	Tina Turner	Won	

=== Legacy ===
As with the previous installments of the Mad Max series, Beyond Thunderdome has influenced popular culture in numerous ways. Of particular note is the widespread use of the term "thunderdome" to describe a contest in which the loser suffers a great hardship.

American filmmaker Chris Weitz has cited the film as an influence.
