= Foreign Affair: The Farewell Tour =

1990 concert tour by Tina Turner

- Tour by Tina Turner
- Ticket stub for a concert in the UK
- Location: Europe
- Associated album: Foreign Affair
- Start date: April 27, 1990
- End date: November 4, 1990
- Legs: 2
- No. of shows: 121
- Attendance: 3.5 million
- Box office: $70 million ($172.5 million in 2025 dollars)

Tina Turner concert chronology
- Break Every Rule World Tour (1987–1988); Foreign Affair: The Farewell Tour (1990); What's Love? Tour (1993)

Foreign Affair: The Farewell Tour (also known as the Foreign Affair: European Tour 1990) was the seventh concert tour by singer Tina Turner. The tour supported her seventh studio album Foreign Affair (1989). The tour was Turner's first stadium tour and only reached European countries. Overall, the tour was attended by approximately three million people—breaking the record for a European tour that was previously set by The Rolling Stones.

The tour is notable as Turner's only tour to not reach North America (Note: Since Turner's comeback in 1984. Turner toured Australia only in 1977). Since the tour was considered a farewell tour (at that time), Turner wanted to exclusively tour Europe to thank her fans for supporting her career after she became a solo artist.

== Background ==
The tour was advertised as a "farewell" tour as Turner began to concentrate on potential acting roles. During an interview, Turner stated,

"I've always thought this would be the final one but I must admit I now have mixed feelings. I'm the first woman to fill all these stadiums and the feeling from all those fans night after night was fantastic. I don't want to close that door completely. I'm going away for about a year and when I'm ready to return, I just hope the fans will want whatever I have to offer."

Turner would return to touring in 1993 with her North American tour, "What's Love? Tour".

== Broadcasts and recordings ==
Turner bidding farewell during the concert at Woburn Abbey

The groundbreaking tour was filmed at the Estadi Olímpic de Montjuïc in Barcelona and was released on VHS titled, "Do You Want Some Action?". To celebrate Turner's 2021 induction into the Rock and Roll Hall of Fame, a remastered version of the recording was released in 2021, alongside an audio CD of the full concert.

Fan-recorded footage of opening night in Antwerp is available on YouTube. The concert at Pallatrussadi, Milan was filmed and was also used as part of the MTV film. Although the real professional, multi-camera recording is not in circulation, there is a fan-shot, full-length video of the concert on YouTube.

The concert at Woburn Abbey was filmed and part of which was used in an MTV mini-documentary, promoting Turner's tour. The intro to this show was used as part of an interview with Turner and the music video to "Be Tender with Me Baby" is the encore to this show. It is available on the DVD "All The Best - The Live Collection" and also YouTube and the single for the song. There are no known copies of the full-length in circulation.

Additionally, the concert in Athens was broadcast live on ET2.

== Personnel ==
- Bass guitar: Bob Fiet
- Dancers: Ann Behringer and Le'Jeune Richardson
- Drums: Jack Bruno
- Guitar: John Miles and James Ralston
- Keyboards: Tim Cappello, Ollie Marland and Miffy Smith
- Percussion: Tim Cappello
- Piano: Kenny Moore
- Saxophone: Tim Cappello
- Supporting vocals: Tim Cappello, John Miles, Ollie Marland, Kenny Moore, and James Ralston

== Opening act ==
- The Neville Brothers (Spain, July 1990)

== Setlist ==
April 27, 1990 – May 22, 1990

Act 1

1. "The Best"
2. "Ask Me How I Feel"
3. "River Deep – Mountain High"
4. "Private Dancer"
5. "We Don't Need Another Hero (Thunderdome)"
6. "I Can't Stand the Rain"
7. "Nutbush City Limits"

Act 2

8. "Steamy Windows"
9. "Undercover Agent for the Blues"
10. "Foreign Affair"
11. "Typical Male"
12. "I Don't Wanna Lose You"
13. "What's Love Got to Do with It?"
14. "Let's Stay Together"
15. "Proud Mary"

Encore

16. "Good Times"
17. "Be Tender with Me Baby"
18. "Better Be Good to Me"
May 24, 1990 – November 4, 1990

Act 1

1. "Steamy Windows"
2. "Typical Male"
3. "Foreign Affair"
4. "Undercover Agent for the Blues"
5. "Ask Me How I Feel"
6. "We Don't Need Another Hero (Thunderdome)"
7. "Private Dancer"
8. "I Can't Stand the Rain"
9. "Nutbush City Limits"

Act 2

10. "Addicted to Love"
11. "The Best"
12. "I Don't Wanna Lose You"
13. "What's Love Got to Do with It?"
14. "Let's Stay Together"
15. "Proud Mary"

Act 3

16. "What You Get Is What You See"
17. "Show Some Respect"
18. "Better Be Good to Me"

Encore

19. "Be Tender with Me Baby"

Notes

- During the opening night concert at the Sportpaleis in Antwerp, Turner performed "You Can't Stop Me Loving You" and "Look Me in the Heart".
- During the concerts in Oldenburg, Turner performed "New Sensation"

== Tour dates ==
Date	City	Country	Venue
April 27, 1990	Antwerp	Belgium	Sportpaleis
April 28, 1990	Antwerp	Belgium	Sportpaleis
May 1, 1990	Verona	Italy	Arena di Verona
May 3, 1990	Milan	Italy	PalaTrussardi
May 4, 1990	Milan	Italy	PalaTrussardi
May 5, 1990	Milan	Italy	PalaTrussardi
May 7, 1990	Rome	Italy	Palazzo dello Sport
May 8, 1990	Cava de' Tirreni	Italy	Stadio Simonetta Lamberti
May 9, 1990	Florence	Italy	PalaSport
May 12, 1990	Gothenburg	Sweden	Scandinavium
May 14, 1990	Helsinki	Finland	Helsinki Ice Hall
May 15, 1990	Helsinki	Finland	Helsinki Ice Hall
May 17, 1990	Stockholm	Sweden	Stockholm Globe Arena
May 18, 1990	Stockholm	Sweden	Stockholm Globe Arena
May 19, 1990	Stockholm	Sweden	Stockholm Globe Arena
May 20, 1990	Oslo	Norway	Valle Hovin
May 22, 1990	Gentofte	Denmark	Gentofte Stadion
May 24, 1990	Karlsruhe	West Germany	Wildparkstadion
May 26, 1990	Cologne	West Germany	Müngersdorfer Stadion
May 27, 1990	Munich	West Germany	Olympiastadion
May 29, 1990	West Berlin	West Germany	Waldbühne
May 30, 1990	West Berlin	West Germany	Waldbühne
May 31, 1990	West Berlin	West Germany	Waldbühne
June 2, 1990	Stuttgart	West Germany	Neckarstadion
June 3, 1990	Frankfurt	West Germany	Waldstadion
June 4, 1990	Hanover	West Germany	Niedersachsenstadion
June 6, 1990	Oldenburg	West Germany	Weser-Ems Halle
June 7, 1990	Oldenburg	West Germany	Weser-Ems Halle
June 9, 1990	Bremen	West Germany	Weser-Stadion
June 10, 1990	Nuremberg	West Germany	Zeppelin Field
June 13, 1990	Linz	Austria	Linzer Stadion
June 14, 1990	Vienna	Austria	Praterstadion
June 16, 1990	Basel	Switzerland	St. Jakob Stadium
June 17, 1990	Basel	Switzerland	St. Jakob Stadium
June 19, 1990	Dortmund	West Germany	Westfalenhallen
June 20, 1990	Dortmund	West Germany	Westfalenhallen
June 21, 1990	Essen	West Germany	Grugahalle
June 23, 1990	Rotterdam	Netherlands	Feyenoord Stadion
June 24, 1990	Maastricht	Netherlands	Maastricht Exhibition & Congress Centre
June 26, 1990	Maizières-lès-Metz	France	Parc Schtroumpf
June 28, 1990	Versailles	France	Palace of Versailles
June 30, 1990	Lausanne	Switzerland	Stade Olympique de la Pontaise
July 1, 1990	Lugano	Switzerland	Cornaredo Stadium
July 2, 1990	Lyon	France	Halle Tony Garnier
July 4, 1990	Madrid	Spain	Plaza de Toros Las Ventas
July 6, 1990	Barcelona	Spain	Plaça de Toros La Monumental
July 8, 1990	Gijón	Spain	Estadio El Molinón
July 11, 1990	Aix-en-Provence	France	Stade Pratèsi
July 14, 1990	Birmingham	England	NEC Arena
July 15, 1990	Birmingham	England	NEC Arena
July 17, 1990	Birmingham	England	NEC Arena
July 18, 1990	Birmingham	England	NEC Arena
July 19, 1990	Birmingham	England	NEC Arena
July 21, 1990	Gateshead	England	Gateshead International Stadium
July 22, 1990	Gateshead	England	Gateshead International Stadium
July 24, 1990	Ipswich	England	Portman Road
July 25, 1990	Ipswich	England	Portman Road
July 28, 1990	Woburn	England	Woburn Abbey
July 29, 1990	Woburn	England	Woburn Abbey
August 1, 1990	Nimes	France	Arena of Nimes
August 3, 1990^{[A]}	Monte Carlo	Monaco	Salle des Etoiles
August 5, 1990	Frejus	France	Arenes de Frejus
August 7, 1990	Albenga	Italy	Stadio Comunale Annibale Riva
August 9, 1990	Bari, Italy	Italy	Stadio San Nicola
August 11, 1990	Catanzaro	Italy	Stadio Comunale di Cantanzaro
August 13, 1990	Viareggio	Italy	Stadio dei Pini
August 15, 1990	Lignano Sabbiadoro	Italy	Stadio Comunale Teghil
August 16, 1990	Bolzano	Italy	Stadio Druso
August 18, 1990	Velika Gorica (Note: Promoted as Zagreb)	Yugoslavia	Gradski Stadion Velika Gorica
August 19, 1990	Belgrade	Yugoslavia	Zemun Stadium
August 24, 1990	Utrecht	Netherlands	Stadion Nieuw-Galgenwaard
August 25, 1990	East Berlin	East Germany	Radrennbahn Weißensee
August 26, 1990	Hockenheim	West Germany	Hockenheimring Baden-Württemberg
August 28, 1990	Athens	Greece	Nikos Goumas Stadium
August 29, 1990	Thessaloniki	Greece	Toumba Stadium
August 30, 1990	Floriana	Malta	Independence Arena
September 1, 1990^{[B]}	Lüneburg	West Germany	Flugplatz Lüneburg
September 2, 1990	Leipzig	East Germany	Zentralstadion
September 4, 1990	Innsbruck	Austria	Olympiahalle
September 6, 1990	Budapest	Hungary	Hidegkuti Nándor Stadion
September 7, 1990	Graz	Austria	Eisstadion Liebenau
September 8, 1990	Vienna	Austria	Praterstadion
September 9, 1990	Salzburg	Austria	Residenzplatz
September 11, 1990	Brussels	Belgium	Forest National
September 12, 1990	Brussels	Belgium	Forest National
September 16, 1990	Glasgow	Scotland	Scottish Exhibition Hall 4
September 17, 1990	Belfast	Northern Ireland	King's Hall
September 19, 1990	London	England	Wembley Arena
September 20, 1990	London	England	Wembley Arena
September 21, 1990	London	England	Wembley Arena
September 22, 1990	London	England	Wembley Arena
September 24, 1990	London	England	Wembley Arena
September 25, 1990	London	England	Wembley Arena
September 26, 1990	London	England	Wembley Arena
September 29, 1990	Lisbon	Portugal	Estádio José Alvalade
October 1, 1990	La Coruña	Spain	Pabellón de Deportes de Riazor
October 2, 1990	Bilbao	Spain	Plaza de Toros de Vista Alegre
October 3, 1990	Madrid	Spain	Vicente Calderon Stadium
October 5, 1990	Barcelona	Spain	Estadi Olímpic de Montjuïc
October 6, 1990	Barcelona	Spain	Estadi Olímpic de Montjuïc
October 7, 1990	Les Escaldes	Andorra	Aparcament al Pavelló del Prat Gran
October 9, 1990	Zaragoza	Spain	Estadio de la Romareda
October 10, 1990	Toulouse	France	Palais des Sports
October 11, 1990	Bordeaux	France	Patinoire de Mériadeck
October 13, 1990	Zürich	Switzerland	Hallenstadion
October 15, 1990	Paris	France	Palais Omnisports de Paris-Bercy
October 16, 1990	Paris	France	Palais Omnisports de Paris-Bercy
October 17, 1990	Nantes	France	Le Grand Palais
October 19, 1990	Lille	France	Espace Foire
October 20, 1990	Frankfurt	Germany	Festhalle
October 21, 1990	Munich	Germany	Olympiahalle
October 22, 1990	Cologne	Germany	Kölner Sporthalle
October 24, 1990	Birmingham	England	NEC Arena
October 25, 1990	Birmingham	England	NEC Arena
October 27, 1990	Dublin	Ireland	RDS Simmonscourt
October 28, 1990	Dublin	Ireland	RDS Simmonscourt
October 29, 1990	Dublin	Ireland	RDS Simmonscourt
November 1, 1990	Heerenveen	Netherlands	Isstadion Thialf
November 2, 1990	Rotterdam	Netherlands	Sportpaleis
November 3, 1990	Rotterdam	Netherlands	Sportpaleis
November 4, 1990	Rotterdam	Netherlands	Sportpaleis

Festivals and other miscellaneous performances
^{A} This concert was a part of the "Monte-Carlo Sporting Summer Festival"
^{B} This concert was a part of the "NDR2 Open Air Festival"

Cancellations and rescheduled shows

May 5, 1990	Turin, Italy	Stadio Comunale Vittorio Pozzo	Cancelled
September 5, 1990	Karlsruhe, Germany	Wildparkstadion	Cancelled
