= Simply the Best (Tina Turner album) =

1991 greatest hits album by Tina Turner

Greatest hits album by Tina Turner
- Released: October 22, 1991
- Recorded: 1973–1991
- Genres: Pop; rock
- Length: 73:33
- Label: Capitol

Tina Turner chronology
Foreign Affair (1989)	Simply the Best (1991)	What's Love Got to Do with It (1993)

Singles from Simply the Best
- 1. "Nutbush City Limits (The 90s Version)" Released: September 1991; 2. "Love Thing" Released: November 1991 (US); 3. "Way of the World" Released: November 1991 (UK); 4. "I Want You Near Me" Released: May 1992

Professional ratings
Review scores
Source	Rating
AllMusic	4.5/5 stars
Calgary Herald	A−
Robert Christgau	A−
Entertainment Weekly	C

Simply the Best is the first greatest hits compilation by Tina Turner, released on October 22, 1991, by Capitol Records.

== Overview ==
The album includes Turner's most popular hits since her comeback in the early mid-1980s. It also includes three new songs that were previously unreleased: "Love Thing" (UK No. 29), "I Want You Near Me" (No. 22 UK), and "Way of the World" (UK No. 13) as well as a re-recorded contemporary dance version of Turner's classic "Nutbush City Limits" (UK No. 23), all of which were also issued as singles in 1991 and 1992. The album is Turner's biggest seller in the UK where it sold 2.1 million copies. It was certified 8× platinum in the UK and stayed on the UK charts for over 140 weeks. The album sold over 7 million copies worldwide.

The compilation was released with a different track listing in the US with the songs "Addicted to Love (Live)" and "Be Tender with Me Baby" being replaced by "What You Get Is What You See" and "Look Me in the Heart". In Australia, a limited edition of the album was also released and features a five-track bonus disc. It includes a re-recording of "The Best" as a duet with Jimmy Barnes, which was retitled "(Simply) The Best" and was released as a single, as well as a fourth new song called "I'm a Lady", which was released in other regions as the B-side to "Love Thing".

== Track listing ==
=== Original version ===
No.	Title	Writer(s)	Original release	Length
1.	"The Best" (7" edit)	Holly Knight; Mike Chapman	Foreign Affair, 1989	4:10
2.	"What's Love Got to Do with It"	Terry Britten; Graham Lyle	Private Dancer, 1984	3:50
3.	"I Can't Stand the Rain"	Don Bryant; Bernard Miller; Ann Peebles	Private Dancer	3:44
4.	"I Don't Wanna Lose You"	Albert Hammond; Graham Lyle	Foreign Affair	4:18
5.	"Nutbush City Limits" (The 90s Version)	Tina Turner	original remix	3:44
6.	"Let's Stay Together" (7" edit)	Al Green; Al Jackson Jr.; Willie Mitchell	standalone single, 1983	3:39
7.	"Private Dancer" (7" edit)	Mark Knopfler	Private Dancer	4:01
8.	"We Don't Need Another Hero (Thunderdome)" (7" edit)	Britten; Lyle	Mad Max Beyond Thunderdome, 1985	4:14
9.	"Better Be Good to Me" (7" edit)	Knight; Chapman; Nicky Chinn	Private Dancer	3:40
10.	"River Deep – Mountain High" (Ike & Tina Turner)	Jeff Barry; Ellie Greenwich; Phil Spector	River Deep – Mountain High, 1966	3:37
11.	"Steamy Windows"	Tony Joe White	Foreign Affair	4:02
12.	"Typical Male"	Britten; Lyle	Break Every Rule, 1986	4:14
13.	"It Takes Two" (with Rod Stewart)	Sylvia Moy; William "Mickey" Stevenson	standalone single, 1990	4:13
14.	"Addicted to Love" (Live in London, England, 1986)	Robert Palmer	Tina Live in Europe, 1988	5:10
15.	"Be Tender with Me Baby"	Knight; Hammond	Foreign Affair	4:17
16.	"I Want You Near Me"	Britten; Lyle	previously unreleased	3:53
17.	"Way of the World"	Hammond; Lyle	previously unreleased	4:19
18.	"Love Thing"	Knight; Hammond	previously unreleased	4:28

=== UK double LP (ESTV 1-1 & 1-2) version ===
No.	Title	Writer(s)	Length
1.	"The Best"	Chapman; Knight	4:08
2.	"I Can't Stand the Rain"	Bryant; Miller; Peebles	3:42
3.	"What's Love Got to Do with It"	Britten; Lyle	3:48
4.	"I Don't Wanna Lose You"	Hammond; Lyle	4:18
5.	"Let's Stay Together"	Green; Jackson; Mitchell	3:37
6.	"Steamy Windows"	White	4:03
7.	"Typical Male"	Britten; Lyle	4:15
8.	"We Don't Need Another Hero (Thunderdome)"	Britten; Lyle	4:14
9.	"Private Dancer"	Knopfler	4:01
10.	"Better Be Good to Me"	Knight; Chapman; Chinn	3:38
11.	"Nutbush City Limits" (The 90s Version)	Turner	3:42
12.	"It Takes Two" (with Rod Stewart)	Moy; Stevenson	4:13
13.	"River Deep – Mountain High" (Ike & Tina Turner)	Barry; Greenwich; Spector	3:38
14.	"Be Tender with Me Baby"	Knight; Hammond	4:16
15.	"Addicted to Love" (Live, London 1986)	Palmer	5:03
16.	"I Want You Near Me"	Britten; Lyle	3:52
17.	"Way of the World"	Hammond; Lyle	4:24
18.	"Love Thing"	Hammond; Knight	4:27

=== US version ===
No.	Title	Writer(s)	Original release	Length
1.	"The Best" (7" edit)	Chapman; Knight		4:08
2.	"Better Be Good to Me" (7" edit)	Chapman; Chinn; Knight		3:38
3.	"I Can't Stand the Rain"	Bryant; Miller; Peebles		3:42
4.	"What's Love Got to Do with It"	Britten; Lyle		3:48
5.	"I Don't Wanna Lose You"	Hammond; Lyle		4:18
6.	"Nutbush City Limits" (The 90s Version)	Turner		3:42
7.	"What You Get Is What You See"	Britten; Lyle	Break Every Rule	4:26
8.	"Let's Stay Together" (7" edit)	Green; Jackson; Mitchell		3:37
9.	"River Deep – Mountain High" (Ike & Tina Turner)	Barry; Greenwich; Spector		3:37
10.	"Steamy Windows"	White		4:03
11.	"Typical Male"	Britten; Lyle		4:15
12.	"We Don't Need Another Hero (Thunderdome)" (7" edit)	Britten; Lyle		4:14
13.	"Private Dancer" (7" edit)	Knopfler		4:00
14.	"Look Me in the Heart"	Tom Kelly; Billy Steinberg	Foreign Affair	3:39
15.	"It Takes Two" (with Rod Stewart)	Moy; Stevenson		4:11
16.	"I Want You Near Me"	Britten; Lyle		3:52
17.	"Way of the World"	Hammond; Lyle		4:24
18.	"Love Thing"	Hammond; Knight		4:27

=== Australian version ===
No.	Title	Writer(s)	Length
1.	"The Best" (7" edit)	Chapman; Knight	4:10
2.	"Better Be Good to Me" (7" edit)	Chapman; Chinn; Knight	3:40
3.	"I Can't Stand the Rain"	Bryant; Miller; Peebles	3:44
4.	"What's Love Got to Do with It"	Britten; Lyle	3:50
5.	"I Don't Wanna Lose You"	Hammond; Lyle	4:18
6.	"Nutbush City Limits" (The 90s Version)	Turner	3:44
7.	"What You Get Is What You See"	Britten; Lyle	4:28
8.	"Let's Stay Together" (7" edit)	Green; Jackson; Mitchell	3:39
9.	"Addicted to Love" (Live, London 1986) (Alternate version)	Palmer	5:05
10.	"River Deep – Mountain High" (Ike & Tina Turner)	Barry, Greenwich, Spector	3:37
11.	"Steamy Windows"	White	4:02
12.	"Typical Male"	Britten; Lyle	4:14
13.	"We Don't Need Another Hero (Thunderdome)" (7" edit)	Britten; Lyle	4:14
14.	"Private Dancer" (7" edit)	Knopfler	4:01
15.	"Look Me in the Heart"	Kelly; Steinberg	3:41
16.	"It Takes Two" (with Rod Stewart)	Moy; Stevenson	4:13
17.	"I Want You Near Me"	Britten; Lyle	3:53
18.	"Way of the World"	Hammond; Lyle	4:19
19.	"Love Thing"	Hammond; Knight	4:28

Limited edition bonus disc, 1992
No.	Title	Writer(s)	Original release	Length
1.	"(Simply) The Best" (with Jimmy Barnes)	Chapman; Knight	original duet version	4:11
2.	"I'm a Lady"	Britten; Lyle	previously unreleased	3:24
3.	"I Can't Stand the Rain" (Extended 12" remix)	Bryant; Miller; Peebles		5:43
4.	"Be Tender with Me Baby"	Knight; Hammond		4:17
5.	"Show Some Respect"	Britten; Sue Shifrin	Private Dancer	3:17

== B-sides ==
Title	Single(s)
"Nutbush City Limits" ('91)	"Nutbush City Limits" (The 90s Version)
"I'm a Lady"	"Love Thing" and "(Simply) The Best"
"Let's Dance" (Live)	"I Want You Near Me"

== Charts ==
=== Weekly charts ===
1991–1992 weekly chart performance for Simply the Best
Chart (1991–1992)	Peak position
Australian Albums (ARIA)	12
Austrian Albums (Ö3 Austria)	8
Belgian Albums (IFPI)	1
Canada Top Albums/CDs (RPM)	40
Danish Albums (Hitlisten)	1
Dutch Albums (Album Top 100)	5
European Albums (Music & Media)	4
Finnish Albums (Suomen virallinen lista)	5
German Albums (Offizielle Top 100)	4
Hungarian Albums (MAHASZ)	6
Irish Albums (IFPI)	2
Italian Albums (Musica e dischi)	5
New Zealand Albums (RMNZ)	1
Norwegian Albums (VG-lista)	6
Portuguese Albums (UNEVA)	1
Spanish Albums (AFYVE)	11
Swedish Albums (Sverigetopplistan)	5
Swiss Albums (Schweizer Hitparade)	3
UK Albums (Official Charts)	2
US Billboard 200	113
US Top R&B/Hip-Hop Albums (Billboard)	99
US Cash Box Top Pop Albums	78

1994 weekly chart performance for Simply the Best
Chart (1994)	Peak position
Scottish Albums (Official Charts)	13
UK Albums (Official Charts)	9

1996 weekly chart performance for Simply the Best
Chart (1996)	Peak position
Belgian Albums (Ultratop Flanders)	23
French Compilation Albums (SNEP)	16

2000 weekly chart performance for Simply the Best
Chart (2000)	Peak position
Danish Albums (Hitlisten)	3

2013 weekly chart performance for Simply the Best
Chart (2013)	Peak position
Italian Albums (FIMI)	77

2023 weekly chart performance for Simply the Best
Chart (2023)	Peak position
Belgian Albums (Ultratop Wallonia)	49
New Zealand Albums (RMNZ)	29
Portuguese Albums (AFP)	41
UK Albums (Official Charts)	17

=== Year-end charts ===
1991 year-end chart performance for Simply the Best
Chart (1991)	Position
Dutch Albums (Album Top 100)	58
European Albums (Music & Media)	57
German Albums (Offizielle Top 100)	86
New Zealand Albums (RMNZ)	27
Norwegian Fall Period Albums (VG-lista)	10
UK Albums (OCC)	4

1992 year-end chart performance for Simply the Best
Chart (1992)	Position
Australian Albums (ARIA)	56
Austrian Albums (Ö3 Austria)	31
European Albums (Music & Media)	22
German Albums (Offizielle Top 100)	29
New Zealand Albums (RMNZ)	7
Norwegian Winter Period Albums (VG-lista)	11
UK Albums (OCC)	21

1993 year-end chart performance for Simply the Best
Chart (1993)	Position
Australian Albums (ARIA)	88
Dutch Albums (Album Top 100)	58
New Zealand Albums (RMNZ)	21
UK Albums (OCC)	81

1994 year-end chart performance for Simply the Best
Chart (1994)	Position
UK Albums (OCC)	67

1996 year-end chart performance for Simply the Best
Chart (1996)	Position
UK Albums (OCC)	130

2000 year-end chart performance for Simply the Best
Chart (2000)	Position
Danish Albums (Hitlisten)	93

2002 year-end chart performance for Simply the Best
Chart (2002)	Position
Canadian R&B Albums (Nielsen SoundScan)	142

=== Decade-end charts ===
Decade-end chart performance for Simply the Best
Chart (1990–1999)	Position
UK Albums (OCC)	14

== Certifications and sales ==
Certifications and sales for Simply the Best
Region	Certification	Certified units/sales
Argentina (CAPIF)	Platinum	60,000^{^}
Australia (ARIA)	3× Platinum	210,000^{^}
Austria (IFPI Austria)	2× Platinum	100,000^{*}
Belgium (BRMA)	2× Platinum	100,000^{*}
Canada (Music Canada)	Gold	50,000^{^}
Denmark	—	74,330
Finland (Musiikkituottajat)	Platinum	58,539
France (SNEP)	Gold	100,000^{*}
Germany (BVMI)	3× Gold	750,000^{^}
Italy (FIMI)	Gold	25,000^{‡}
Netherlands (NVPI)	Platinum	100,000^{^}
New Zealand (RMNZ)	Platinum	15,000^{^}
Norway (IFPI Norway)	2× Platinum	100,000^{*}
Poland (ZPAV)	Gold	50,000^{*}
Spain (Promusicae)	Platinum	100,000^{^}
Sweden (GLF)	Platinum	100,000^{^}
Switzerland (IFPI Switzerland)	2× Platinum	100,000^{^}
United Kingdom (BPI)	8× Platinum	2,400,000
United States (RIAA)	Platinum	1,733,000
Summaries
Worldwide	—	7,000,000
^{*} Sales figures based on certification alone.^{^} Shipments figures based on certification alone.^{‡} Sales+streaming figures based on certification alone.
