= What's Love? Tour =

1993 concert tour by Tina Turner

- Tour by Tina Turner
- Cover of tour program
- Location: Europe; North America; Oceania
- Associated album: What's Love Got to Do with It
- Start date: June 6, 1993
- End date: November 18, 1993
- Legs: 4
- No. of shows: 98
- Attendance: 1.5 million
- Box office: $50 million ($111 million in 2025 dollars)

Tina Turner concert chronology
- Foreign Affair: The Farewell Tour (1990); What's Love? Tour (1993); Wildest Dreams Tour (1996–1997)

The What's Love? Tour is the eighth concert tour by singer Tina Turner. The tour supported Turner's autobiographical film and its soundtrack and the eighth studio album titled What's Love Got to Do with It (1993). The tour primarily visited North America along with a few shows in Europe and Oceania.

== Background ==
In 1990, Turner mentioned her record-breaking, 1990 tour, would be her last. Initially, Turner was to have a one-year break before resuming the tour in North America. The tour continuation was placed on hold as Turner decided to focus on acquiring movie roles. As time progressed, Turner changed her focus to the production of her semi-autobiographical film. In an interview with People, Turner stated,

As much as I try to break away from performing, here they are again, asking me to go back on Top of The Pops .I became the first woman in rock n' roll to go out and sell out whole stadiums – and I'm proud of that; I'm proud that I sang to 188,000 people one night in Brazil. But what people don't know is that I got so nervous about touring. I got very upset about doing my last tour – at the start – and actually broke down crying. Of course, when you're out there and a crowd is going wild, you don't think about that. I know a lot of singers and stars find their fame overnight when they are barely much more than teenagers. But I had to work damn hard for over 30 years to get where I am today. So I don't mind making the effort. I'm still going to making the effort. In Hollywood, a lot of stars are thinking about retiring at my age, but I'm not packing up. No retirement place in the sun for me. I will still be working at something when I'm 90.

Turner's last tour of North America was in 1987 during her Break Every Rule World Tour, which saw poor ticket sales for a majority of shows. Turner later confessed that she did not tour her previous record due to lack of sales in that region, as many spectators still had a hard time disconnecting her from The Revue. After numerous sold-out stadium performances in Europe, Turner wanted to do an intimate tour. The tour consisted of the same music and costumes as her previous set. Turner included new material from the soundtrack, along with different variations on her well-known hits. Originally destined as a North America only tour, Turner decided to add a few dates in Europe for summer music festivals and Australia and New Zealand where she appeared at the New South Wales Rugby League Grand Final, as their anthem was "The Best". In Australia, Turner also performed the after-race concert following the 1993 Australian Grand Prix in Adelaide where she was joined on stage by the race winner, triple World Drivers' Champion Ayrton Senna.

== Broadcasts and recordings ==
The tour was chronicled at the Blockbuster Pavilion in San Bernardino, California. Released in September 1994, "What's Love: Live" included a special performance of "Why Must We Wait Until Tonight". It was directed by David Mallett and produced by Paul Flattery. Additionally, the concert was recorded in Sydney, New South Wales, Australia at the Sydney Entertainment Centre as a special for local television.

== Setlist ==
The following setlist was obtained from the Groton concert held on July 28, 1993. It does not represent all concerts for the duration of the tour.

1. "Steamy Windows"
2. "Typical Male"
3. "Foreign Affair"
4. "Undercover Agent for the Blues"
5. "Private Dancer"
6. "We Don't Need Another Hero (Thunderdome)"
7. "I Can't Stand the Rain"
8. "Nutbush City Limits"
9. "Addicted to Love"
10. "(Simply) The Best"
11. "I Don't Wanna Fight"
12. "Let's Stay Together"
13. "What's Love Got to Do with It"
14. "Proud Mary"
  Encore
15. "What You Get Is What You See"
16. "Better Be Good to Me"

Notes

- During select shows in North America, "Disco Inferno" replaced "What You Get Is What You See".
- On July 17, 1993, Turner performed "I Might Have Been Queen" and "Shake a Tail Feather".
- Starting on September 10, "Legs" replaced "What You Get Is What You See".
- During the Adelaide concert, Ayrton Senna joined Turner onstage to perform "(Simply) The Best".
- Starting on October 18, "Show Some Respect" replaced "Legs".
- Turner performed "Why Must We Wait Until Tonight" during the show in San Bernardino and the third concert in Sydney.

== Tour dates ==
Date	City	Country	Venue	Opening acts
North America
June 6, 1993	Reno	United States	Lawlor Events Center	Lindsey Buckingham; Chris Isaak
June 8, 1993	Portland	United States	Memorial Coliseum	Lindsey Buckingham; Chris Isaak
June 10, 1993	Vancouver	Canada	Pacific Coliseum	Lindsey Buckingham; Chris Isaak
June 12, 1993	George	United States	Gorge Amphitheatre	Lindsey Buckingham; Chris Isaak
June 15, 1993	Calgary	Canada	Olympic Saddledome	Lindsey Buckingham; Chris Isaak
June 16, 1993	Edmonton	Canada	Northlands Coliseum	Lindsey Buckingham; Chris Isaak
June 17, 1993	Saskatoon	Canada	Saskatchewan Place	Lindsey Buckingham; Chris Isaak
June 18, 1993	Winnipeg	Canada	Winnipeg Arena	Lindsey Buckingham; Chris Isaak
June 20, 1993	Minneapolis	United States	Target Center	Lindsey Buckingham; Chris Isaak
June 22, 1993	Bonner Springs	United States	Sandstone Amphitheater	Lindsey Buckingham; Chris Isaak
June 24, 1993	Maryland Heights	United States	Riverport Amphitheatre	Lindsey Buckingham; Chris Isaak
June 25, 1993 (Note: Part of Summerfest.)	Milwaukee	United States	Marcus Amphitheater	Lindsey Buckingham; Chris Isaak
June 26, 1993	Noblesville	United States	Deer Creek Music Center	Lindsey Buckingham; Chris Isaak
June 27, 1993	Hoffman Estates	United States	Poplar Creek Music Theater	Lindsey Buckingham; Chris Isaak
June 29, 1993	Cincinnati	United States	Riverbend Music Center	Lindsey Buckingham; Chris Isaak
June 30, 1993	Clarkston	United States	Pine Knob Music Theatre	Lindsey Buckingham; Chris Isaak
July 1, 1993	Cuyahoga Falls	United States	Blossom Music Center	Lindsey Buckingham; Chris Isaak
July 3, 1993	Vaughan	Canada	Kingswood Music Theatre	Lindsey Buckingham; Chris Isaak
July 4, 1993	Montreal	Canada	Montreal Forum	Lindsey Buckingham; Chris Isaak
July 5, 1993	Ottawa	Canada	Ottawa Civic Centre	Lindsey Buckingham; Chris Isaak
July 8, 1993	Burgettstown	United States	Coca-Cola Star Lake Amphitheater	Lindsey Buckingham; Chris Isaak
July 9, 1993	Allentown	United States	Allentown Fairgrounds Grandstand	Lindsey Buckingham; Chris Isaak
July 10, 1993	Darien	United States	Darien Lake Performing Arts Center	Lindsey Buckingham; Chris Isaak
July 12, 1993	New York City	United States	Radio City Music Hall	Lindsey Buckingham; Chris Isaak
July 13, 1993	New York City	United States	Radio City Music Hall	Lindsey Buckingham; Chris Isaak
July 14, 1993	New York City	United States	Radio City Music Hall	Lindsey Buckingham; Chris Isaak
July 16, 1993	New York City	United States	Radio City Music Hall	Lindsey Buckingham; Chris Isaak
July 17, 1993	New York City	United States	Radio City Music Hall	Lindsey Buckingham; Chris Isaak
July 19, 1993	Holmdel	United States	Garden State Arts Center	Lindsey Buckingham; Chris Isaak
July 20, 1993	Wantagh	United States	Jones Beach Marine Theater	Lindsey Buckingham; Chris Isaak
July 21, 1993	Nashua	United States	Holman Stadium	Lindsey Buckingham; Chris Isaak
July 23, 1993	Atlantic City	United States	Mark Etess Arena	Lindsey Buckingham; Chris Isaak
July 24, 1993	Atlantic City	United States	Mark Etess Arena	Lindsey Buckingham; Chris Isaak
July 25, 1993	Stowe	United States	Stowe Mountain Performing Arts Center	Lindsey Buckingham; Chris Isaak
July 28, 1993	Groton	United States	Thames River Music Center	Lindsey Buckingham; Chris Isaak
July 29, 1993	Mansfield	United States	Great Woods Center for the Performing Arts	Lindsey Buckingham; Chris Isaak
July 30, 1993	Portland	United States	Cumberland County Civic Center	Lindsey Buckingham; Chris Isaak
July 31, 1993	Saratoga Springs	United States	Saratoga Performing Arts Center	Lindsey Buckingham; Chris Isaak
August 1, 1993	Columbia	United States	Merriweather Post Pavilion	Lindsey Buckingham; Chris Isaak
August 4, 1993	Richmond	United States	Classic Amphitheatre	Lindsey Buckingham; Chris Isaak
August 5, 1993	Raleigh	United States	Hardee's Walnut Creek Amphitheatre	Lindsey Buckingham; Chris Isaak
August 7, 1993	Hilton Head Island	United States	Shelter Cove Community Park	Lindsey Buckingham; Chris Isaak
August 10, 1993	Atlanta	United States	Coca-Cola Lakewood Amphitheatre	Lindsey Buckingham; Chris Isaak
August 12, 1993	Dallas	United States	Coca-Cola Starplex Amphitheatre	Lindsey Buckingham; Chris Isaak
August 13, 1993	The Woodlands	United States	Cynthia Woods Mitchell Pavilion	Lindsey Buckingham; Chris Isaak
August 14, 1993	San Antonio	United States	Alamodome	Lindsey Buckingham; Chris Isaak
August 15, 1993	Little Rock	United States	Riverfest Amphitheater	Lindsey Buckingham; Chris Isaak
August 17, 1993	Memphis	United States	Mud Island Amphitheatre	Lindsey Buckingham; Chris Isaak
August 18, 1993	New Orleans	United States	Lakefront Arena	Lindsey Buckingham; Chris Isaak
August 20, 1993	Orlando	United States	Orlando Arena	Lindsey Buckingham; Chris Isaak
August 21, 1993	Tampa	United States	USF Sun Dome	Lindsey Buckingham; Chris Isaak
August 22, 1993 (Note: Part of Y100 20th Birthday Party.)	Miami	United States	Miami Arena	Lindsey Buckingham; Chris Isaak
Europe
August 27, 1993 (Note: Part of Rock Over Danube.)	Vienna	Austria	Danube Island	—N/a
August 28, 1993 (Note: Part of Rock Over Germany '93.)	Munich	Germany	Munich-Riem Airport	—N/a
August 29, 1993	Wegberg	Germany	RAF Wildenrath	—N/a
September 3, 1993	Basel	Switzerland	St. Jakob Stadium	John Mellencamp; Joe Cocker
September 4, 1993	Mainz	Germany	Finthen Airfield	—N/a
September 5, 1993	Lüneburg	Germany	Lüneburg Airfield	—N/a
North America
September 10, 1993	Concord	United States	Concord Pavilion	Lindsey Buckingham; Chris Isaak
September 11, 1993	Mountain View	United States	Shoreline Amphitheatre	Lindsey Buckingham; Chris Isaak
September 12, 1993	Sacramento	United States	Cal Expo Amphitheatre	Lindsey Buckingham; Chris Isaak
September 14, 1993	San Diego	United States	San Diego Sports Arena	Lindsey Buckingham; Chris Isaak
September 15, 1993	San Bernardino	United States	Blockbuster Pavilion	Lindsey Buckingham; Chris Isaak
September 16, 1993	Tucson	United States	Tucson Community Center	Lindsey Buckingham; Chris Isaak
September 17, 1993	Phoenix	United States	Desert Sky Pavilion	Lindsey Buckingham; Chris Isaak
September 18, 1993	Las Vegas	United States	Thomas & Mack Center	Lindsey Buckingham; Chris Isaak
September 19, 1993	Los Angeles	United States	Greek Theatre	Lindsey Buckingham; Chris Isaak
September 20, 1993	Los Angeles	United States	Greek Theatre	Lindsey Buckingham; Chris Isaak
September 21, 1993	Los Angeles	United States	Greek Theatre	Lindsey Buckingham; Chris Isaak
September 22, 1993	Los Angeles	United States	Greek Theatre	Lindsey Buckingham; Chris Isaak
September 23, 1993	Los Angeles	United States	Greek Theatre	Lindsey Buckingham; Chris Isaak
Oceania
October 9, 1993	Perth	Australia	Perth Entertainment Centre	—N/a
October 11, 1993	Perth	Australia	Perth Entertainment Centre	—N/a
October 12, 1993	Perth	Australia	Perth Entertainment Centre	—N/a
October 15, 1993	Newcastle	Australia	Newcastle Entertainment Centre	—N/a
October 16, 1993	Newcastle	Australia	Newcastle Entertainment Centre	—N/a
October 18, 1993	Sydney	Australia	Sydney Entertainment Centre	—N/a
October 19, 1993	Sydney	Australia	Sydney Entertainment Centre	—N/a
October 20, 1993	Sydney	Australia	Sydney Entertainment Centre	—N/a
October 22, 1993	Canberra	Australia	Royal Theater	—N/a
October 23, 1993	Canberra	Australia	Royal Theater	—N/a
October 25, 1993	Brisbane	Australia	Brisbane Entertainment Center	—N/a
October 27, 1993	Melbourne	Australia	National Tennis Centre	—N/a
October 28, 1993	Melbourne	Australia	National Tennis Centre	—N/a
October 30, 1993	Melbourne	Australia	National Tennis Centre	—N/a
November 1, 1993	Townsville	Australia	Townsville Entertainment Center	—N/a
November 2, 1993	Townsville	Australia	Townsville Entertainment Center	—N/a
November 3, 1993	Cairns	Australia	Cairns Showground	—N/a
November 5, 1993	Darwin	Australia	Darwin Garden Amphitheater	—N/a
November 7, 1993 (Note: Part of 1993 Australian Grand Prix.)	Adelaide	Australia	Rymill Park	—N/a
November 8, 1993	Melbourne	Australia	National Tennis Centre	—N/a
November 9, 1993	Melbourne	Australia	National Tennis Centre	—N/a
November 11, 1993	Brisbane	Australia	Brisbane Entertainment Center	—N/a
November 12, 1993	Auckland	New Zealand	Logan Campbell Centre	—N/a
November 13, 1993	New Plymouth	New Zealand	Bowl of Brooklands	—N/a
November 15, 1993	Dunedin	New Zealand	University Oval	—N/a
November 16, 1993	Christchurch	New Zealand	Lancaster Park	—N/a
November 18, 1993	Wellington	New Zealand	Wellington Show and Sports Centre	—N/a

=== Box office score data ===
Venue	City	Tickets sold / available	Gross revenue
Lawlor Events Center	Reno	11,800 / 11,800 (100%)	—N/a
Radio City Music Hall	New York City	29,075 / 29,075 (100%)	$1,205,320
Jones Beach Marine Theater	Wantagh	10,979 / 10,979 (100%)	$311,125
Mark Etess Arena	Atlantic City	9,160 / 9,160 (100%)	$348,805
Danube Island	Vienna	40,000 / 40,000 (100%)	—N/a
Finthen Airfield	Mainz	70,000 / 70,000 (100%)	—N/a
Greek Theatre	Los Angeles	30,860 / 30,860 (100%)	$988,020
Sydney Entertainment Centre	Sydney	34,500 / 34,500 (100%)	—N/a
TOTAL		236,374 / 236,374 (100%)	$2,853,270

== Tour band ==
- James Ralston – electric guitar, vocals
- John Miles – electric guitar, vocals
- Bob Feit – bass guitar
- Jack Bruno – drums
- Timmy Cappello – percussion, synthesizer, tenor saxophone, harmonica, vocals
- Ollie Marland – synthesizer, vocals
- Kenny Moore – piano, vocals
- Sharon Owens – dancer, vocals
- Karen Owens – dancer, vocals
