= Way of the World (Tina Turner song) =

1991 single by Tina Turner

Single by Tina Turner

from the album Simply the Best
- B-side: "I Don't Wanna Lose You"; "Foreign Affair"
- Released: November 4, 1991
- Length: 4:22
- Label: Capitol
- Songwriters: Albert Hammond; Graham Lyle; Kris Kristofferson
- Producers: Chris Lord-Alge; Albert Hammond; Graham Lyle; Roger Davies

Tina Turner singles chronology
"Nutbush City Limits (The 90s Version)" (1991)	"Way of the World" (1991)	"Love Thing" (1991)

Music video
- "Way of the World" on YouTube

"Way of the World" is a song by American singer and actress Tina Turner from her first compilation album, Simply the Best (1991). As one of four new songs recorded for the album, it was released in November 1991, by Capitol Records. It is written by Albert Hammond, Graham Lyle and Kris Kristofferson, and produced by Hammond and Lyle with Chris Lord-Alge and Roger Davies. "Way of the World" became a top-20 hit in several European countries, including reaching number 12 in both Austria and Ireland and number 13 in the United Kingdom. Although it did not chart in the United States, it peaked at number 70 in Canada.

== Track listings ==
- 7-inch single
1. "Way of the World" – 4:22
2. "I Don't Wanna Lose You" – 4:16
- Maxi-CD and 12-inch maxi
1. "Way of the World" – 4:22
2. "I Don't Wanna Lose You" – 4:16
3. "Foreign Affair"

== Charts ==
=== Weekly charts ===
Chart (1991–1992)	Peak position
Australia (ARIA)	117
Austria (Ö3 Austria Top 40)	12
Belgium (Ultratop 50 Flanders)	16
Canada Top Singles (RPM)	70
Canada Adult Contemporary (RPM)	18
Europe (Eurochart Hot 100)	31
Europe (European Hit Radio)	5
France (SNEP)	25
Germany (GfK)	33
Ireland (IRMA)	12
Luxembourg (Radio Luxembourg)	3
Netherlands (Dutch Top 40)	16
Netherlands (Single Top 100)	15
Switzerland (Schweizer Hitparade)	29
UK Singles (Official Charts)	13
UK Airplay (Music Week)	6

=== Year-end charts ===
Chart (1992)	Position
Netherlands (Dutch Top 40)	151

== Release history ==
Region	Date	Format(s)	Label(s)	Ref.
United Kingdom	November 4, 1991	7-inch vinyl; 12-inch vinyl; CD; cassette	Capitol	
Australia	December 2, 1991	7-inch vinyl; CD; cassette	Interfusion; Festival	
