= St. Jakob Stadium =

Former football stadium in Basel, Switzerland

- Joggeli
- Interactive map of St. Jakob Stadium
- Location: Basel, Switzerland
- Coordinates: 47°32′29″N 7°37′12″E
- Owner: Genossenschaft Stadion St. Jakob-Park
- Capacity: 51,500 (1954); 36,800 (1998)
- Record attendance: c. 60,000

Construction
- Built: 1953–1954
- Opened: 24 April 1954
- Closed: 1998

Tenants
- FC Concordia Basel, FC Basel (1964–1998)

The St. Jakob Stadium was a football stadium in Basel, Switzerland and the former home of Swiss club FC Basel. It was built in view of the 1954 FIFA World Cup, and as well as serving as a club stadium, it hosted several important matches, including some FIFA World Cup matches in 1954 and four European Cup Winners' Cup finals.

After closing in 1998, St. Jakob-Park was built in its place. It was nicknamed "Joggeli" (a diminutive of "Jakob" in the local dialect) by Basel supporters.

== Important games ==
=== 1954 World Cup ===
During the 1954 FIFA World Cup, St. Jakob Stadium hosted 4 group stage matches, one quarter-final match, and one semi-final match.

== Other Major Events ==
Tickets and posters for a planned Madonna concert on 31 August 1987, were printed, but the event never materialised, because of failed negotiations between Madonna's management and the Swiss concert promoter. A gig in Nice, France was instead organised for that date.

The Rolling Stones performed here on 15 July 1982 on their European Tour, 26 June 1990 as part on their Urban Jungle Tour and July 29–30, 1995 as part of their Voodoo Lounge Tour.

Pink Floyd performed here on 26 July 1988 as part of their A Momentary Lapse of Reason Tour and on 6 and 7 August 1994 as part of their The Division Bell Tour.

AC/DC performed here on 25 August 1991 with Metallica, Queensrÿche and Mötley Crüe on their Monsters of Rock festival.

Tina Turner performed here 5 times during her Break Every Rule Tour on 27 June 1987, Foreign Affair: The Farewell Tour on 16 and 17 June 1990, What's Love? Tour on 3 September 1993, Wildest Dreams Tour on 5 July 1996.

Michael Jackson performed in front of 50,000 people during his Bad World Tour on 16 June 1988. Actress Elizabeth Taylor and singer Bob Dylan attended the show. Jackson planned a Dangerous World Tour concert in Basel on 11 September 1992 but the show was cancelled because the singer was ill. Jackson performed in Basel his last Swiss concert on 25 July 1997 in front of over 55,000 people during his HIStory World Tour.

Preceded by De Kuip; Rotterdam	European Cup Winners' Cup; Final venue 1969	Succeeded by Prater Stadium; Vienna
Preceded by De Kuip; Rotterdam	European Cup Winners' Cup; Final venue 1975	Succeeded by Heysel Stadium; Brussels
Preceded by Parc des Princes; Paris	European Cup Winners' Cup; Final venue 1979	Succeeded by Heysel Stadium; Brussels
Preceded by Ullevi; Gothenburg	European Cup Winners' Cup; Final venue 1984	Succeeded by De Kuip; Rotterdam
