= Make Me Over =

Make Me Over may refer to:

- "Make Me Over", a song by Ike & Tina Turner from the 1973 album Nutbush City Limits
- "Make Me Over", a song by Lifehouse from their 2007 album Who We Are
