= Big Red Bash =

Music festival in Queensland, Australia

Coordinates: 25.8776°S 139.0556°E

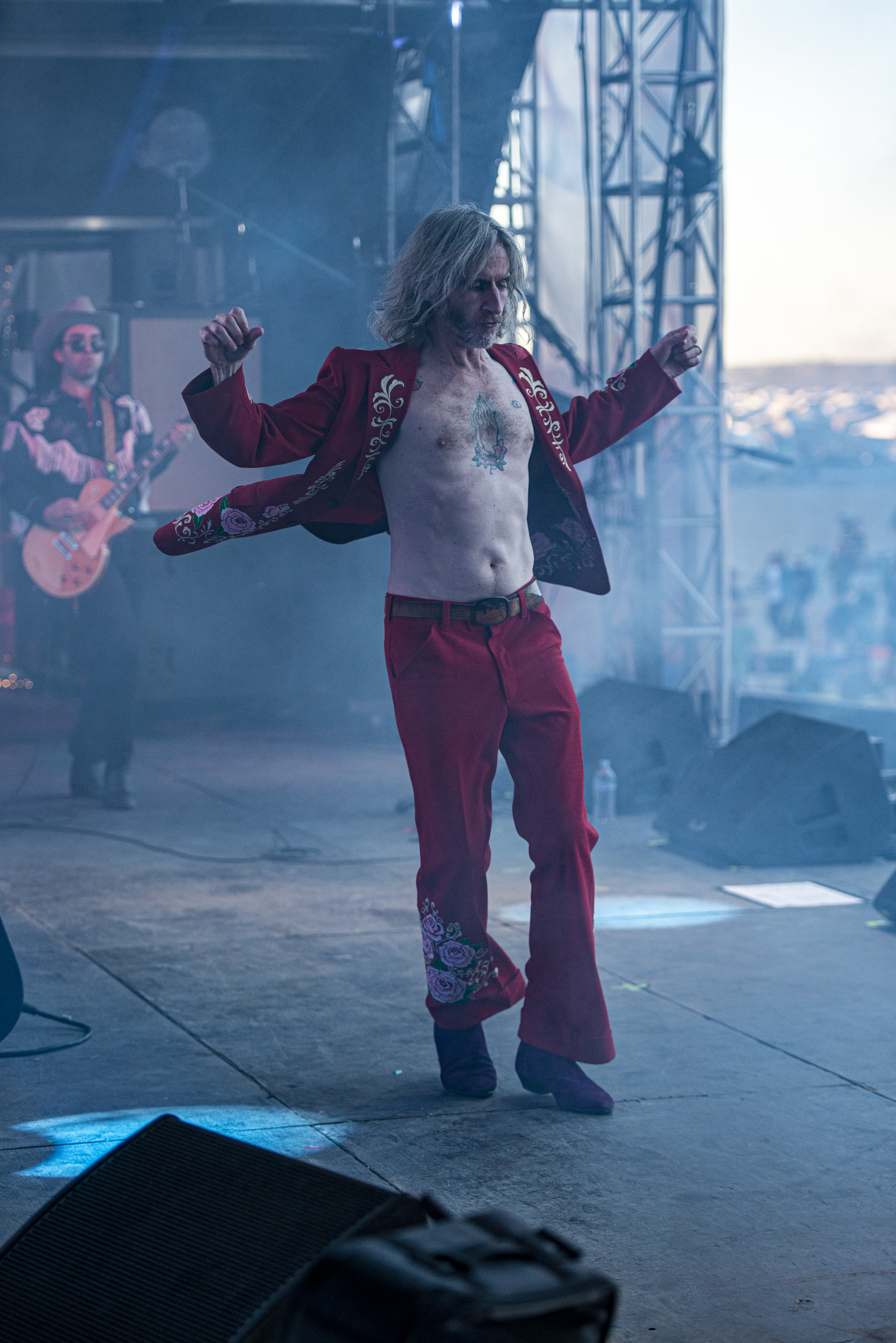
Tim Rogers, 2022

The Big Red Bash is an annual music festival held in the Simpson Desert, 35 kilometres west of Birdsville in Queensland, Australia. The music is mostly Australian Rock. The festival emphasizes fundraising. The first Big Red Bash occurred in 2013. In 2023, the event drew more than 11,000 visitors to the red centre. The Big Red Bash was founded by Greg Donovan who continues to organise the event today. It is marketed as the world's most remote music festival.

The festival site is a 1.3 million-hectare organic cattle station. The concert area measures 63,000 square metres. The event takes places over three days in July. Camel rides and sand dune boogie boarding are popular recreational activities on offer.

The 2026 event was cancelled due to flooding.

== History ==
John Williamson performed at the first Big Red Bash. About 500 people were in attendance for the 2013 festival.

Since 2016, the festival has held attempts at the world record for Nutbush City Limits dancers. 5,838 people set a new world record in 2023.

The 2020 event was cancelled due to the COVID-19 pandemic.

Despite the ongoing pandemic the 2021 event went ahead with a COVID-safe plan. 90 square metre campsites provided ample distance between campers. That year performers included Paul Kelly, Daryl Braithwaite, Busby Marou, The Black Sorrows, Eurogliders, Sarah McLeod, The Chantoozies, Brian Cadd and Kyle Lionheart.

The 2022 event featured Tim Rogers, Bachelor Girl and a Noiseworks reunion.

In late March 2026, the 2026 event was cancelled due to unprecedented rainfall causing severe flooding in the Birdsville area which was not expected to have dried up by July for the festival. 90% of tickets had already been sold and ticket holders were offered a refund or to transfer their ticket to other events.

== See also ==
- List of festivals in Australia
