= Love Thing =

1991 single by Tina Turner

Single by Tina Turner

from the album Simply the Best
- B-side: "I'm a Lady"
- Released: November 1991
- Genre: Rock
- Length: 4:28
- Label: Capitol
- Songwriters: Albert Hammond; Holly Knight
- Producers: Chris Lord-Alge; Tina Turner; Roger Davies

Tina Turner singles chronology
"Way of the World" (1991)	"Love Thing" (1991)	"I Want You Near Me" (1992)

Music video
- "Love Thing" on YouTube

"Love Thing" is a song by American recording artist Tina Turner, released in November 1991 by Capitol Records from her 1991 greatest hits album, Simply the Best. It is written by Holly Knight and Albert Hammond, and Turner co-produced it with Chris Lord-Alge and Roger Davies. The single also includes the non-album track "I'm a Lady", written and produced by Terry Britten and Graham Lyle. The accompanying music video was directed by American film director and producer Michael Bay and features American model Tyra Banks.

== Critical reception ==
Larry Flick from Billboard magazine commented, "New song featured on upcoming greatest-hits collection, Simply the Best, is a swaggering rocker, replete with crunchy guitars and a muscular rhythm section. Tune and arrangement are a perfect match for Turner's signature growl." A reviewer from Liverpool Echo wrote, "Tough stuff this time with heavy rock riffs matched with aggressive vocals. Not for the faint-hearted."

== Charts ==
Weekly chart performance for "Love Thing"
Chart (1992)	Peak position
Australia (ARIA)	62
Europe (Eurochart Hot 100)	91
Germany (GfK)	67
Netherlands (Dutch Top 40)	36
Netherlands (Single Top 100)	41
UK Singles (Official Charts)	29
UK Airplay (Music Week)	13
US Cash Box Top 100	77

== Release history ==
Release dates and formats for "Love Thing"
Region	Date	Format(s)	Label(s)	Ref.
United States	November 1991	CD; cassette	Capitol	
Australia	February 3, 1992	7-inch vinyl; CD; cassette	Interfusion; Festival	
United Kingdom	February 3, 1992	7-inch vinyl; CD; cassette	Capitol	
