= I Want You Near Me =

Single by Tina Turner

from the album Simply the Best
- B-side: "Let's Dance" (Live)
- Released: May 1992
- Length: 4:28
- Label: Capitol
- Songwriters: Terry Britten; Graham Lyle
- Producer: Britten

Tina Turner singles chronology
"Love Thing" (1992)	"I Want You Near Me" (1992)	"(Simply) The Best" (1992)

"I Want You Near Me" is a song by American recording artist and actress Tina Turner, released in May 1992 by Capitol Records from her 1991 compilation album, Simply the Best, on which it was one of four new recordings. The single, written by Terry Britten and Graham Lyle, and produced by the former, peaked at number 22 in the United Kingdom.

== Charts ==
Chart performance for "I Want You Near Me"
Chart (1992)	Peak position
Europe (European Hot 100 Singles)	54
Germany (Official German Charts)	53
UK Singles (OCC)	22
UK Airplay (Music Week)	30
