= Nutbush (dance) =

Dance based on a Tina Turner song

The Nutbush is a line dance performed to Ike & Tina Turner's song "Nutbush City Limits". The dance, which emerged during the 1970s disco era, is particularly popular in Australia, where it has been taught in schools.

The dance is generally performed by a group of people of all genders and ages at social functions, and has been performed in schools, weddings and community events. The dance is usually performed with the dancers positioned roughly in a box configuration. The steps are fairly simple, so that one can generally pick them up by watching other dancers. A key to the song and dance being a popular combination is that the song has a moderately long introduction before the strong dance beat starts, which allows people who are sitting down to get up to the dance floor, and for all dancers to assemble themselves in a grid.

== History ==
The origins of the Nutbush dance are elusive, but it was clearly named after Tina Turner's place of birth. Despite the wide popularity of the dance, Tina Turner herself never performed it. However, writing in the student newspaper of the University of Sydney, Honi Soit, in 2023, Lucy Bailey noted the similarities between the Nutbush and the dancing of Turner and her backup singers (The Ikettes) during the 1970s, most particularly in a 1975 clip from the television variety show Cher.

A 2024 joint study by the University of South Australia and Edith Cowan University traced the possible origin of the dance to the New South Wales Department of Education, which reportedly developed the dance as a teaching aid in the mid-1970s; the study also found that the Nutbush may have been based on the existing Madison dance, or that the Nutbush may have evolved from schools initially attempting to teach students the Madison.

A June 2026 episode of the Slate podcast Decoder Ring reports it is actually a faster version of the dance that accompanied "Alley Cat", but was misattributed as The Madison in public education curricula. It was taught in Australian schools for years before Ike & Tina Turner recorded "Nutbush City Limits". They assert patrons of gay discotheques in Melbourne may have started the trend of doing the dance to the "Nutbush City Limits".

The Nutbush took off in Australia as it spread in schools during the late-1970s and 1980s. The dance has continued to be implemented in some Australian states' curricula, which has been given as the reason for its enduring popularity in the country.

In 2019 and 2020, the dance gained widespread international attention when it was the subject of various viral TikTok videos.

== Implementation ==
The steps to the dance are as follows:

- hands are generally placed akimbo and feet shoulder-width apart in a neutral position. The following moves take place on the beat of the drum during the song.
- the dancers have their weight on the left leg and the right foot is moving: touch their foot to the ground right, and then returned to the initial stance. Repeat once (two touches). Weight is changed to the right leg and step is repeated with the left foot, touching left, return, and repeat once. (eight beats)
- the dancers then change weight back to left leg and move their foot back half a pace, touch, and return to the original stance. Twice touch on the right foot and twice with the left. (eight beats)
- the right knee is brought across the body to approximately the height of the left hip twice, continuing with the left knee to right hip twice. (eight beats)
- this is followed by a single kick of the right leg across the body and following with the left. (four beats)
- and finally, the last four beats of the song are colloquially known as "turn-and-clap" whereupon the dancers turn clockwise ¼, pause, then clap.

Variations of the final step are known to occur. For example, jumping both feet out (beat 1), jumping and crossing over your legs (beat 2), then uncrossing out to the side (beat 3), and finally "do the clap." (beat 4) This variation is known as the criss-cross.

== World record attempts ==
In 2015, dancers in the Victorian town of Horsham set the first Guinness World Record for the number of people doing the Nutbush, with 254 dancers. On 19 October 2017, students at Rivermount College in Yatala, Queensland doubled this record with 522 dancers. On 12 July 2018 the record was broken again at the Big Red Bash, a music festival situated beneath the Big Red Dune on the edge of the Simpson Desert in outback Queensland. Crowds lined up to take part, dancing along to "Nutbush City Limits" as 1,719 people took part in the challenge. On 16 July 2019, a new record of 2,330 people performed the Nutbush at the Big Red Bash, breaking the previous year's record. On 7 July 2022, a new record of 4,084 people performed the Nutbush at the Big Red Bash, breaking the previous record. The record was again broken at the Big Red Bash on 6 July 2023 with 5,838 dancers.
