= Steamy Windows =

1989 single by Tina Turner

Single by Tina Turner

from the album Foreign Affair
- B-side: "Not Enough Romance"
- Released: November 1989
- Genre: Rock; blues rock; funk rock
- Length: 4:03
- Label: Capitol
- Songwriter: Tony Joe White
- Producer: Dan Hartman

Tina Turner singles chronology
| "I Don't Wanna Lose You" (1989) | "Steamy Windows" (1989) | "Look Me in the Heart" (1990) |

Music video
- "Steamy Windows" on YouTube

"Steamy Windows" is a song by American singer Tina Turner. It was included on Turner's seventh studio album, Foreign Affair (1989), and released as the album's second single in November 1989. In the United Kingdom, it was instead issued as the third single on February 5, 1990. It was written by Tony Joe White and produced by Dan Hartman. It became a top ten hit in Belgium, Ireland and Italy, while reaching the top forty on the majority of all charts it appeared on.

Turner performed the song as the opening number during her 1990, 1993 and 2008/2009 concert tours.

== Critical reception ==
Greg Kot from Chicago Tribune noted that "Steamy Windows" begins with some of Tony Joe White's trademark "Polk Salad Annie" guitar, "a funky, gut-bucket sound that is further enhanced by some back-porch harmonica fills. It's the perfect atmosphere for Turner, a rural Tennessee native, to dig deep into her back-roads Southern past and sing about back-seat affairs." Pan-European magazine Music & Media said it "recalls the Ike & Tina sound of the late 60s. A massive hit."

David Giles from Music Week wrote, "Delightfully risqué number that finds Turner's trad blues vocal neatly complemented by a spruced-up country-style rhythm with plenty of harmonica and mischievous guitar runs." He added further, "I was thinking 'bout parking the other night", "runs the lyric. The thought doesn't last long, though, as the windows are soon moist with "body heat". What can they be up to in there?" People Magazine found that Turner "sounds as passionate and expressive as ever", describing the song as "a contagious piece of funk rock". The reviewer added, "But why would a 49-year-old woman sing about necking in the back seat of a car?" USA Today viewed it as "spicy". John Mackie from The Vancouver Sun called it "a sultry little ditty about back seat hijinks".

== Retrospective review ==
In a 2019 retrospective review, Matthew Hocter from Albumism stated that "Steamy Windows" is the "epitome" of adult contemporary, adding that it "in true Turner style", incorporates elements of the blues and a whole lot of rock. Bil Carpenter from AllMusic also noted that here, the singer "tackled" rock. The Daily Vault's Mark Millan called it "one of Turner's sexiest moments ever recorded", describing it as "a great swampy blues/rock song that finds Turner lamenting those wild nights of teenage lust". In a 2015 review, Pop Rescue found that the singer's voice is "hard, confident, and perfectly suited to this pop-rock sound, which she delivers an effortless growl."

== Music video ==
The official music video for the song was directed by British commercial, film and music video director Andy Morahan. The video features Tina performing in a white slip dress and heels, in front of a steamed and wet glass, creating "steamy windows". The video has intercuts to couples in cars. It was later published on Turner's official YouTube channel in March 2009. The video has amassed more than 4,4 million views as of September 2021.

== Other versions ==
A dance version of the track co-produced and remixed by Justin Strauss and Murray Elias was also issued as a separate remix single in certain territories. Tony Joe White later recorded his own version of the song (alongside "Undercover Agent for the Blues", another track he wrote for Foreign Affair) on his album Closer to the Truth (1991). The song has also been covered by John Anderson, Kenny Chesney and Shemekia Copeland.

== Track listings ==
- European 7-inch and CD single
1. "Steamy Windows" – 4:02
2. "Not Enough Romance" – 4:03
- Australian 7-inch single
1. "Steamy Windows" – 4:02
2. "Bold and Reckless" – 3:48
- US 7-inch and cassette single
1. "Steamy Windows" – 4:03
2. "The Best" (edit) – 4:08
- UK 7-inch and cassette single
1. "Steamy Windows" – 4:03
2. "The Best" (Single Muscle mix) – 4:15
- European CD and 12-inch single
1. "Steamy Windows" – 4:02
2. "Stronger Than the Wind" – 3:59
3. "Not Enough Romance" – 4:03
- UK CD single
1. "Steamy Windows" – 4:03
2. "The Best" (extended Muscle mix) – 5:30
3. "Steamy Windows" (vocal mix) – 6:22
- European CD and 12-inch single (Remixes)
1. "Steamy Windows" (12-inch vocal mix) – 6:20
2. "Steamy Windows" (7-inch mix) – 4:19
3. "Steamy Windows" (12-inch dub mix) – 6:36
- European CD and 12-inch single (Remixes)
1. "Steamy Windows" (12-inch house mix) – 7:08
2. "Steamy Windows" (7-inch house mix) – 4:09
3. "Steamy Windows" (12-inch house dub mix) – 6:50
- Australian 12-inch single
1. "Steamy Windows" (12-inch vocal mix) – 6:20
2. "Steamy Windows" (12-inch dub mix) – 6:35
3. "Steamy Windows" (12-inch house dub mix) – 6:48
4. "Bold and Reckless" – 3:48
- US 12-inch single
1. "Steamy Windows" (12-inch vocal mix) – 6:20
2. "Steamy Windows" (12-inch house mix) – 7:08
3. "Steamy Windows" (12-inch dub mix) – 6:35
4. "Steamy Windows" (12-inch house dub mix) – 6:48
- UK 12-inch single
1. "Steamy Windows" (vocal mix) – 6:20
2. "The Best" (Muscle mix) – 4:15
3. "Steamy Windows" (house mix) – 7:08

== Personnel ==
- Tina Turner – lead vocals
- Tony Joe White – guitar, harmonica, synthesizer
- Dan Hartman – piano, Hammond organ
- Eddie Martinez – rhythm guitar
- Neil Taylor – guitar
- Gary Barnacle – saxophones
- Jeff Bova – horn section
- Carmine Rojas – bass guitar
- J.T. Lewis – drums

== Charts ==
=== Weekly charts ===
| Chart (1989–1990) | Peak position |
|---|---|
| Australia (ARIA) | 34 |
| Austria (Ö3 Austria Top 40) | 18 |
| Belgium (Ultratop 50 Flanders) | 5 |
| Canada Top Singles (RPM) | 25 |
| Canada Retail Singles (RPM) | 15 |
| Europe (European Hot 100 Singles) | 31 |
| Ireland (IRMA) | 7 |
| Italy (Musica e dischi) | 5 |
| Italy Airplay (Music & Media) | 15 |
| Luxembourg (Radio Luxembourg) | 8 |
| Netherlands (Dutch Top 40) | 17 |
| Netherlands (Single Top 100) | 16 |
| New Zealand (Recorded Music NZ) | 30 |
| Switzerland (Schweizer Hitparade) | 14 |
| UK Singles (Official Charts) | 13 |
| US Billboard Hot 100 | 39 |
| US Cash Box Top 100 | 40 |
| US Dance Club Songs (Billboard) | 33 |
| West Germany (GfK) | 29 |

== Release history ==
| Region | Date | Format(s) | Label(s) | Ref. |
|---|---|---|---|---|
| United States | November 1989 | 7-inch vinyl; 12-inch vinyl; cassette | Capitol | |
| United Kingdom | February 5, 1990 | 7-inch vinyl; 12-inch vinyl; CD; cassette | Capitol | |
