= Look Me in the Heart =

1990 single by Tina Turner

Single by Tina Turner

from the album Foreign Affair
- B-side: "Steel Claw" (live)
- Released: March 24, 1990
- Genre: Pop
- Length: 3:46
- Label: Capitol
- Songwriters: Billy Steinberg; Tom Kelly
- Producer: Dan Hartman

Tina Turner singles chronology
"Steamy Windows" (1990)	"Look Me in the Heart" (1990)	"Foreign Affair" (1990)

Music video
- "Look Me in the Heart" on YouTube

"Look Me in the Heart" is a song by American recording artist Tina Turner. It was written by Billy Steinberg and Tom Kelly and produced by Dan Hartman for Turner's seventh solo studio album, Foreign Affair (1989). Released as a single in March 1990 by Capitol Records, it reached number 23 on the Irish Singles Chart and number 31 in the United Kingdom. In the United States, it peaked at number eight on the Billboard Adult Contemporary chart. The single was released in a variety of formats, including a live recording of the Private Dancer track "Steel Claw", remixes of "Look Me in the Heart" and the 1987 "Tina Turner Montage Mix", a nine-minute megamix including tracks from Private Dancer and Break Every Rule.

== Critical reception ==
Bill Coleman from Billboard magazine wrote, "Soul-drenched popper should be embraced by several formats. From the underappreciated Foreign Affair album." Greg Kot from Chicago Tribune felt "Look Me in the Heart" "bears an uncanny resemblance" to her earlier cover of Al Green's soul classic "Let's Stay Together". In a retrospective review, Pop Rescue declared it as a "pretty standard little pop song", that "lacks anything more than another saxophone solo and some breathy synths as interest points."

== Track listings ==
- US 7-inch and cassette single; Australian 7-inch single
1. "Look Me in the Heart" – 3:42
2. "Stronger Than The Wind" – 3:59
- French 7-inch and UK 7-inch and cassette single
1. "Look Me in the Heart" – 3:42
2. "Steel Claw" (live) – 4:41
- French CD single
1. "Look Me in the Heart" – 3:42
2. "Steel Claw" (live) – 4:25
3. "The Best" (Extended Mighty mix) – 6:37
- UK CD single
1. "Look Me in the Heart" (L.P. version) – 3:42
2. "Look Me in the Heart" (12-inch remix) – 5:22
3. "Steel Claw" (live) – 4:25
4. "Look Me in the Heart" (instrumental) – 3:39
- UK CD single limited
1. "Look Me in the Heart" (7-inch remix) – 3:44
2. "Look Me in the Heart" (instrumental) – 3:41
3. "The Tina Turner Montage Mix" – 8:54
- UK 12-inch single
1. "Look Me in the Heart" (12-inch remix) – 5:22
2. "Steel Claw" (live) – 4:25
3. "Look Me in the Heart" (instrumental) – 3:39

== Charts ==
=== Weekly charts ===
Chart (1990)	Peak position
Canada Top Singles (RPM)	28
Canada Adult Contemporary (RPM)	12
Europe (European Hot 100 Singles)	77
France (SNEP)	44
Ireland (IRMA)	23
Luxembourg (Radio Luxembourg)	18
UK Singles (Official Charts)	31
US Adult Contemporary (Billboard)	8

=== Year-end charts ===
Chart (1990)	Position
Canada Adult Contemporary (RPM)	96

== Release history ==
Region	Date	Format(s)	Label(s)	Ref.
United States	March 24, 1990	7-inch vinyl	Capitol	
Australia	May 7, 1990	7-inch vinyl	Interfusion; Festival	
Australia	May 14, 1990	Cassette	Interfusion; Festival	
United Kingdom	July 30, 1990	7-inch vinyl; 12-inch vinyl; CD	Capitol	
United Kingdom	August 13, 1990	Limited-edition CD	Capitol	
