= Foreign Affair =

Studio album by Tina Turner
- Released: September 18, 1989
- Recorded: 1988–1989
- Studios: The Hit Factory (New York, New York, US); Pathé-Marconi Studios (Paris, France)
- Genre: Pop rock
- Length: 52:16
- Label: Capitol
- Producers: Dan Hartman; Roger Davies; Tina Turner; Rupert Hine; Graham Lyle; Tony Joe White; Albert Hammond

Tina Turner chronology
Tina Live in Europe (1988)	Foreign Affair (1989)	Simply the Best (1991)

Singles from Foreign Affair
- 1. "The Best" Released: August 21, 1989; 2. "I Don't Wanna Lose You" Released: November 6, 1989 (UK); 3. "Steamy Windows" Released: November 1989 (US); 4. "Look Me in the Heart" Released: March 24, 1990 (US); 5. "Foreign Affair" Released: May 1990 (EU); 6. "Be Tender with Me Baby" Released: October 1, 1990

Professional ratings
Review scores
Source	Rating
AllMusic	3/5 stars
USA Today	(favorable)
The Vancouver Sun	3/5 stars

Foreign Affair is the seventh solo studio album by Tina Turner, released on September 18, 1989, through Capitol Records. It was Turner's third album release after her massively successful comeback five years earlier with Private Dancer and her third and last album with the label. Although the album was not a major success in Turner's native United States, it was a huge international hit, especially in Europe. The album reached number one on the UK Albums Chart, her first number one album there. Dan Hartman produced most of the tracks on the album, including the hit single "The Best", which has gone on to become one of Turner's signature songs.

== Composition ==
Foreign Affair falls under the adult contemporary genre and features a diverse range of musical styles, from pop-rock anthems ("The Best", "I Don't Wanna Lose You") to bluesy tracks ("Undercover Agent for the Blues") and power ballads ("Be Tender with Me Baby"). The album features collaborations with prominent musicians, including saxophone solos by Gary Barnacle on at least three tracks and guitar work by Dire Straits frontman Mark Knopfler, who co-wrote Turner's hit "Private Dancer", on the title track.

== Commercial performance ==
While Foreign Affair did not perform as well as Turner's previous albums Private Dancer and Break Every Rule in the US, where it failed to crack the Top 30 in the Billboard 200, it was a worldwide hit, selling over six million copies. In the UK alone the album sold over 1.5 million copies entering the UK Albums Chart at number one (Turner's first album to do so there) and staying in Top 100 for a year and a half. The album also reached number one in numerous other countries including Germany and Sweden and topped the overall European Chart for four weeks.

In 2021, Foreign Affair was released as a box set, which includes a previously unreleased demo of "The Best".

== Single releases ==
Six tracks from the album were released as singles, most of which became hits in various parts of Europe and, to a lesser extent, in the US. "The Best" (US No. 15; UK No. 5) was released as the first single propelling the sales of the album. This was followed by "I Don't Wanna Lose You" (UK No. 8), which was released in Europe only. The album's third single (second in the US) was the opening track, "Steamy Windows" (US. No. 39; UK No. 13), which earned Turner a Grammy nomination.

Three additional singles released in various territories were the title track "Foreign Affair" (Continental Europe only), the ballad "Look Me in the Heart" (No. 8 on the US Adult Contemporary chart; UK No. 31) and the rock ballad "Be Tender with Me Baby" (UK No. 28).

== Track listing ==
Standard edition
No.	Title	Writer(s)	Producers	Length
1.	"Steamy Windows"	Tony Joe White	Dan Hartman	4:03
2.	"The Best"	Mike Chapman; Holly Knight	Hartman; Tina Turner	5:28
3.	"You Know Who (Is Doing You Know What)"	T. White	Hartman	3:45
4.	"Undercover Agent for the Blues"	T. White; Leann White	Hartman	5:20
5.	"Look Me in the Heart"	Tom Kelly; Billy Steinberg	Hartman	3:42
6.	"Be Tender with Me Baby"	Albert Hammond; Knight	Hartman	4:18
7.	"You Can't Stop Me Loving You"	Hammond; Knight	Hartman	4:00
8.	"Ask Me How I Feel"	Hammond; Knight	Hartman; T. Turner	4:46
9.	"Falling Like Rain"	David Munday; Sandy Stewart	Rupert Hine	4:03
10.	"I Don't Wanna Lose You"	Hammond; Graham Lyle	Roger Davies; Lyle; Hammond	4:20
11.	"Not Enough Romance"	Hartman	Hartman	4:04
12.	"Foreign Affair"	T. White	Davies; T. White	4:27

2021 expanded edition bonus disc
No.	Title	Writer(s)	Producers	Length
1.	"Bold and Reckless"	Jeannette Obstoj; Hine	Hine	3:48
2.	"Stronger Than the Wind"	Essra Mohawk; Tony Sciuto	Nick Glennie-Smith; Davies	4:02
3.	"Steel Claw" (live)	Paul Brady	Terry Britten	4:43
4.	"Private Dancer" (live)	Mark Knopfler	John Carter	4:55
5.	"Be Tender with Me Baby" (live)	Hammond; Knight	Hartman	6:50
6.	"The Best" (Extended Muscle Mix)	Chapman; Knight	Hartman; T. Turner; John Luongo^{[a]}	5:28
7.	"Steamy Windows" (12" vocal mix)	T. White	Hartman; Justin Strauss^{[b]}; Daniel Abraham^{[b]}	6:27
8.	"Foreign Affair" (Heartbeat Mix)	T. White	Davies; T. White; Shep Pettibone^{[c]}	4:24
9.	"Look Me in the Heart" (12" remix)	Kelly; Steinberg	Hartman; Bryan "Chuck" New^{[b]}	5:26
10.	"The Best" (Extended Mighty Mix)	Chapman; Knight	Hartman; T. Turner; Luongo^{[a]}	6:37
11.	"Steamy Windows" (12" house dub mix)	T. White	Hartman; Strauss^{[b]}; Abraham^{[b]}	6:51
12.	"Foreign Affair" (One in a Million Club Mix)	T. White	Davies; T. White; Pettibone^{[c]}	6:54
13.	"Steamy Windows" (12" dub mix)	T. White	Hartman; Strauss^{[b]}; Abraham^{[b]}	6:37
14.	"Look Me in the Heart" (instrumental)	Kelly; Steinberg	Hartman; Bryan 'Chuck' New^{[b]}	3:39
15.	"Foreign Affair" (Heartbeat Instrumantal)	T. White	Davies; T. White; Pettibone^{[c]}	4:25
16.	"The Best" (demo)	Chapman; Knight	Rick Nowels	4:54

2021 deluxe edition third bonus disc
No.	Title	Writer(s)	Producers	Length
1.	"Steamy Windows" (live)	T. White	Hartman	7:04
2.	"Typical Male" (live)	Britten; Lyle	Hartman	4:47
3.	"Foreign Affair" (live)	T. White	Davies; Hartman	4:11
4.	"Undercover Agent for the Blues" (live)	T. White; L. White	Hartman	5:07
5.	"Ask Me How I Feel" (live)	Hammond; Knight	Hartman; T. Turner	4:18
6.	"We Don't Need Another Hero" (live)	Britten; Lyle	Britten	4:42
7.	"Private Dancer" (live)	Knopfler	Carter	7:20
8.	"Nutbush City Limits" (live)	T. Turner	Ike Turner	4:18
9.	"Addicted to Love" (live)	Robert Palmer	John Hudson	5:36

2021 deluxe edition fourth bonus disc
No.	Title	Writer(s)	Producers	Length
1.	"The Best" (live)	Chapman; Knight	Hartman; T. Turner	5:47
2.	"I Don't Wanna Lose You" (live)	Hammond; Lyle	Davies; Lyle; Hammond	5:45
3.	"What's Love Got to Do with It" (live)	Britten; Lyle	Britten	6:33
4.	"Let's Stay Together" (live)	Al Jackson Jr.; Willie Mitchell; Al Green	Martyn Ware; Greg Walsh	7:28
5.	"Proud Mary" (live)	John Fogerty	Chris Lord-Alge; T. Turner; Davies	9:30
6.	"Better Be Good to Me" (live)	Knight; Chapman; Nicky Chinn	Hine	11:28
7.	"Be Tender with Me Baby" (live)	Hammond; Knight	Hartman	7:01

2021 deluxe edition fifth bonus disc (DVD)
No.	Title	Directors	Length
1.	"Do You Want Some Action?" (live in Barcelona 1990)	Egbert Van Hees	10:00
2.	"Foreign Affair" (music video)	Paula Walker	4:07
3.	"Look Me in the Heart" (music video)	Walker	3:36
4.	"The Best" (music video)	Lol Creme	4:09
5.	"Steamy Windows" (music video)	Andy Morahan	4:02
6.	"Be Tender with Me Baby" (music video)	Nick Frye	4:32
7.	"I Don't Wanna Lose You" (music video)	Dominic Sena	4:15

Notes

- ^{^[a]} signifies additional producer
- ^{^[b]} signifies remix
- ^{^[c]} signifies post-production and remix

== Personnel ==
Musicians

- Tina Turner – lead vocals (all tracks), backing vocals (3, 7, 8, 10), arrangements (2, 8)
- Dan Hartman – electric piano (1, 3, 4), organ (1, 4), keyboards (2, 3, 11), acoustic guitar (2, 6, 8, 11), backing vocals (2, 5), percussion programming (5), Moog bass (11), drum programming (11)
- Jeff Bova – horn section (1, 4, 5), synth bass (3), organ (4), strings (5)
- Phil Ashley – keyboards (2, 7), bass pulse (2), organ (6), synthesizers (6), strings (6, 7, 8), acoustic piano (8), flute (8)
- Elliot Lewis – additional keyboards (2, 8), strings (2, 8), flute (11)
- Philippe Saisse – additional keyboards (2, 3, 6, 8), slap bass (3), flute solo (5), keyboard mallet and chimes (7)
- Rupert Hine – keyboards (9), bass (9), drum programming (9), backing vocals (9)
- Nick Glennie-Smith – keyboards (10, 12), strings (10, 12), synth bass (12), drum programming (12), bell tree (12)
- Casey Young – keyboards (10)
- Greg Mathieson – synth bass (10)
- Eddie Martinez – rhythm guitar (1, 3, 4), all guitars (5)
- Neil Taylor – slide guitar (1), guitar solo (1)
- Tony Joe White – lead guitar (1, 3, 4, 12), rhythm guitar (1, 3, 4, 12), harmonica (1, 3), synth bass (1, 4)
- Gene Black – rhythm guitar (2, 7, 8), lead guitar (6, 7), guitar solo (6), guitar (10)
- James Ralston – rhythm guitar (2, 6, 7, 8), guitar (10)
- Pat Thrall – guitar solo (2), additional lead guitar fills (6), slide guitar (8), electric guitar (11)
- Phil Palmer – guitars (9)
- Mark Knopfler – guitars (12)
- Carmine Rojas – bass guitar (1, 4, 5)
- T. M. Stevens – bass guitar (2, 3, 6, 7, 8, 11)
- J. T. Lewis – drums (1, 3, 4, 5)
- Art Wood – drums (2, 6, 7, 8)
- Geoff Dugmore – drums (10)
- Danny Cummings – percussion (3, 4, 7), shaker (5), congas (7)
- Albert Hammond – shaker (10), backing vocals (10)
- Gary Barnacle – all saxophones (1, 12), saxophone solo (10)
- Edgar Winter – saxophone solo (2)
- Tim Cappello – saxophone solo (5, 8)
- Roger Davies – arrangements (5)
- Lance Ellington – backing vocals (2, 3, 5, 7, 8, 11)
- Tessa Niles – backing vocals (2, 3, 5–8, 11)
- David Munday – backing vocals (9)
- Sandy Stewart – backing vocals (9)
- Holly Knight – backing vocals (10)
- Graham Lyle – backing vocals (10)

Production

- Dan Hartman – producer (1–8, 11)
- Tina Turner – executive producer, producer (2, 8)
- Rupert Hine – producer (9)
- Roger Davies – executive producer, producer (10, 12)
- Albert Hammond – producer (10)
- Graham Lyle – producer (10)
- Tony Joe White – producer (12)

Technical

- Chris Lord-Alge – recording engineer (1–8, 11), mixing (all tracks)
- Andrew Scarth – recording engineer (9)
- Mike Ging – recording engineer (10, 12)
- Tommy Vicari – recording engineer (10)
- Nick Froome – recording engineer (12)
- Vincent Frerebeau – additional engineer
- John Lee – additional engineer
- Dave O'Donnell – additional engineer
- James Allen-Jones – assistant engineer
- Darren Allison – assistant engineer
- Lee Curle – assistant engineer
- Tim Leitner – assistant engineer
- Paul Logus – assistant engineer
- Ray Pyle – assistant engineer
- David Scott – assistant engineer
- Elliot Singerman – assistant engineer
- Bob Ludwig – mastering

Studios

- Overdubs recorded at Multi-Level (Westport, Connecticut); The Power Station (New York, New York); Lion Share Recording (Los Angeles, California); E-Zee Studios (London, UK); Mayfair Studios (Primrose Hill, London, UK); Swanyard Studios (Islington, London, UK)
- Mixed at The Grey Room (Hollywood, California)
- Mastered at Masterdisk (New York, New York)

Other credits

- Bill Burks – art direction
- Tommy Steele – art direction
- Glenn Sakamoto – design
- Herb Ritts – center photography
- Peter Lindbergh – photography

== Charts ==
=== Weekly charts ===
1989 weekly chart performance for Foreign Affair
Chart (1989)	Peak position
Australian Albums (ARIA)	15
Austrian Albums (Ö3 Austria)	1
Belgian Albums (IFPI)	1
Canada Top Albums/CDs (RPM)	12
Danish Albums (Hitlisten)	1
Dutch Albums (Album Top 100)	9
European Albums (Music & Media)	1
Finnish Albums (Suomen virallinen lista)	1
German Albums (Offizielle Top 100)	1
Greek Albums (IFPI)	1
Italian Albums (Musica e dischi)	2
New Zealand Albums (RMNZ)	7
Norwegian Albums (VG-lista)	1
Portuguese Albums (AFP)	1
Spanish Albums (AFYVE)	8
Swedish Albums (Sverigetopplistan)	1
Swiss Albums (Schweizer Hitparade)	1
UK Albums (Official Charts)	1
US Billboard 200	31
US Top R&B/Hip-Hop Albums (Billboard)	83
US Cash Box Top Pop Albums	28

2021 weekly chart performance for Foreign Affair
Chart (2021)	Peak position
Hungarian Albums (MAHASZ)	31

=== Year-end charts ===
1989 year-end chart performance for Foreign Affair
Chart (1989)	Position
Australian Albums (ARIA)	80
Austrian Albums (Ö3 Austria)	21
Canada Top Albums/CDs (RPM)	75
Dutch Albums (Album Top 100)	60
European Albums (Music & Media)	22
German Albums (Offizielle Top 100)	29
Norwegian Fall Period Albums (VG-lista)	1
Swiss Albums (Schweizer Hitparade)	29
UK Albums (Gallup)	8

1990 year-end chart performance for Foreign Affair
Chart (1990)	Position
Austrian Albums (Ö3 Austria)	4
Dutch Albums (Album Top 100)	45
German Albums (Offizielle Top 100)	7
Norwegian Winter Period Albums (VG-lista)	17
Swiss Albums (Schweizer Hitparade)	5
UK Albums (OCC)	13

== Certifications and sales ==
Certifications and sales for Foreign Affair
Region	Certification	Certified units/sales
Australia (ARIA)	Platinum	70,000^{^}
Austria (IFPI Austria)	3× Platinum	150,000^{*}
Canada (Music Canada)	Platinum	100,000^{^}
Denmark (IFPI Danmark)	2× Platinum	200,000
Finland (Musiikkituottajat)	Platinum	86,895
France (SNEP)	2× Gold	200,000^{*}
Germany (BVMI)	2× Platinum	1,200,000
Italy (FIMI)	2× Platinum	500,000
Netherlands (NVPI)	Platinum	100,000^{^}
New Zealand (RMNZ)	Gold	7,500^{^}
Spain (Promusicae)	Platinum	100,000^{^}
Sweden (GLF)	Platinum	100,000^{^}
Switzerland (IFPI Switzerland)	4× Platinum	200,000^{^}
United Kingdom (BPI)	5× Platinum	1,500,000^{^}
United States (RIAA)	Gold	500,000^{^}
Summaries
Worldwide	—	6,000,000
^{*} Sales figures based on certification alone.^{^} Shipments figures based on certification alone.
