= Be Tender with Me Baby =

Single by Tina Turner

from the album Foreign Affair
- B-side: "You Know Who (Is Doing You Know What)"
- Released: October 1, 1990
- Genre: Rock
- Length: 4:18
- Label: Capitol
- Songwriters: Albert Hammond; Holly Knight
- Producer: Dan Hartman

Tina Turner singles chronology
"Foreign Affair" (1990)	"Be Tender with Me Baby" (1990)	"It Takes Two" (1990)

Music video
- "Be Tender With Me Baby" (live) on YouTube

"Be Tender with Me Baby" is a song by recording artist Tina Turner. Written by Albert Hammond and Holly Knight and produced by Dan Hartman, it was released as a single from Turner's seventh solo studio album, Foreign Affair (1989), in October 1990. Released as a single in the United Kingdom, Ireland, and continental Europe only, it reached number four in Portugal, number 18 in Ireland, number 28 in the UK, and number 35 in the Netherlands. The accompanying music video depicts Turner performing the track at a 1990 concert at Woburn Abbey during her Foreign Affair Tour as an encore, and the seven-minute live version was also included on the single.

== Critical reception ==
Greg Kot from Chicago Tribune felt that Turner adopts the "pleading style of '60s soul greats" like Sam Cooke and Percy Sledge on the song. In a retrospective review, Pop Rescue stated that "Be Tender with Me Baby" "gives Tina a bit of a rock ballad to play with", adding that she "gets plenty of time and space to show off her vocals, which she really does – from a softer vocal near the start, to winning the battle with the soaring strings and electric guitar." The reviewer also noted the "heartfelt ending" of the song.

== Track listings ==
- UK 7-inch and cassette single
1. "Be Tender with Me Baby" (LP version) – 4:18
2. "Be Tender with Me Baby" (live edit) – 4:03
- UK 12-inch single
1. "Be Tender with Me Baby" (LP version) – 4:18
2. "You Know Who (Is Doing You Know What)" (LP version) – 3:45
3. "Be Tender with Me Baby" (live) – 7:04
- UK CD single
1. "Be Tender with Me Baby" (LP version) – 4:18
2. "Be Tender with Me Baby" (live) – 7:04
3. "You Know Who (Is Doing You Know What)" (LP version) – 3:45

== Charts ==
Chart (1990)	Peak position
Europe (European Hot 100 Singles)	75
Ireland (IRMA)	18
Netherlands (Dutch Top 40 Tipparade)	10
Netherlands (Single Top 100)	35
Portugal (AFP)	4
UK Singles (Official Charts)	28
