= Nutbush City Limits =

1973 single by Ike & Tina Turner

Single by Ike & Tina Turner

from the album Nutbush City Limits
- B-side: "Help Him"
- Released: August 1973
- Studio: Bolic Sound (Inglewood, California)
- Genre: Funk rock; country rock; R&B
- Length: 2:57
- Label: United Artists
- Songwriter: Tina Turner
- Producer: Ike Turner

Ike & Tina Turner singles chronology
"Work On Me" (1973)	"Nutbush City Limits" (1973)	"Sweet Rhode Island Red" (1974)

Official Audio
- "Nutbush City Limits" on YouTube

"Nutbush City Limits (Live)"

Single by Tina Turner

from the album Tina Live in Europe
- B-side: "Overnight Sensation" (live), "Legs" (live)
- Released: March 16, 1988
- Genre: Rock
- Length: 3:30
- Label: Capitol
- Songwriter: Tina Turner
- Producer: John Hudson

Tina Turner singles chronology
"Afterglow" (1987)	"Nutbush City Limits (Live)" (1988)	"Addicted to Love (Live)" (1988)

"Nutbush City Limits (The 90s Version)"

Single by Tina Turner

from the album Simply the Best
- B-side: "The Best"
- Released: September 1991
- Genre: Dance-pop
- Length: 3:42
- Label: Capitol
- Songwriter: Tina Turner
- Producers: Chris "C. J." Mackintosh, Dave Dorrell

Tina Turner singles chronology
"It Takes Two" (1990)	"Nutbush City Limits (The 90s Version)" (1991)	"Way of the World" (1991)

Music video
- "Nutbush City Limits" on YouTube

"Nutbush City Limits" is a semi-autobiographical song written by American singer and actress Tina Turner which commemorates her rural hometown of Nutbush in Haywood County, Tennessee, United States. Originally released as a single on United Artists Records in August 1973, it is one of the last hits that husband-wife R&B duo Ike & Tina Turner released together.

In the years since, "Nutbush City Limits" has been performed by popular artists such as Bob Seger and The Silver Bullet Band, AC/DC and the Alvin Lee band in their album RX5. Besides, Turner herself has re-recorded several different versions of the song.

As an unincorporated rural community, Nutbush does not have geographical city limits; rather, its general boundaries are indicated by signs reading "Nutbush, Unincorporated" which are posted on the local highway (Tennessee State Route 19).

A line dance to the song, called the "Nutbush", created in the mid-1970s as a teaching aid in Australia, has seen sustained popularity in that country, and later gained viral popularity internationally through TikTok.

== Recording and release ==
Produced by Ike Turner, "Nutbush City Limits" was recorded at the Turners' Bolic Sound recording studio in Inglewood, California in May 1973. The song is characterized by inventive guitar sounds, a clavinet, a substantial Moog synthesizer solo by Ike, and a funky brass section.

Typical of the period, none of the session musicians who contributed to "Nutbush City Limits" were given specific mention in the song credits. Alan Krigger, the future drummer of Giuffria, claimed being the drummer in an interview. It has been rumored for years that Marc Bolan, frontman and guitarist of the glam rock band T. Rex, played the distinctive guitar part on the track. Gloria Jones, his girlfriend at the time—who herself provided backing vocals for Ike & Tina Turner during the 1960s—asserted that this was the case in the 2007 BBC4 documentary Marc Bolan: The Final Word. This claim is bolstered by the fact that Bolan toured the U.S. extensively and resided in the Los Angeles area during the mid-1970s, and is also acknowledged to have played on the Ike & Tina Turner singles "Sexy Ida (Part 2)" and "Baby—Get It On". However, a 2008 Ebony magazine article about Ike Turner's death identified James "Bino" Lewis, then a member of Ike & Tina's backing band Kings of Rhythm, as the guitarist. It has also been suggested that James Lewis is the guitarist on "Baby, Get It On". There are likewise two guitars on that track: a rhythm guitar track with a fuzz effect in the centre pan (often theorised to be inspired by Bolan), with a quieter lead guitar track featuring a wah-wah effect panned in the right channel, which is more stylistically typical of 1970s R&B session musicians like Lewis and regular Kings of Rhythm guitarist Jackie Clark.

Originally released as a single on United Artists Records in August 1973, it was one of the last hit singles released by Ike & Tina Turner as a duo.

In 1984, a live version of "Nutbush City Limits" was released as the b-side of Tina Turner's single "Private Dancer" (the fourth U.S. single released from her "Private Dancer" album). This is a different version from the 1988 live version of the song, released as single in Europe, from her Break Every Rule world tour.

== Reception and awards ==
The single received positive reviews. A reviewer for Cash Box (August 11, 1973) wrote:

"Proud Mary" was the single that brought this dynamic group to national attention. Well, here's one that leaves all of their prior efforts in the dust. Absolutely sensational is the only way this future smash can be described. Has to go top 20.

The single was a hit in various countries, peaking at No. 11 on the Billboard R&B singles chart, No. 22 on the Billboard Hot 100, and No. 4 on the UK Singles Chart. It also reached No. 1 in Austria, and No. 2 in Switzerland and West Germany. In Australia, the single peaked at No. 14, spent 52 weeks in the top 100, and is still a party staple among Generation X and Y where it is accompanied by a dance of the same name.

The song was the lead single from album Nutbush City Limits, released in November 1973, which peaked at No. 22 on the Billboard R&B albums chart.

In 1973, the single was certified silver by the British Phonographic Industry (BPI) for selling a quarter of a million units. In 1974, the Turners received the first ever Golden European Award for selling more than one million records of "Nutbush City Limits" in Europe.

== 1988 live version ==
Following the couple's split, the song became a staple of Tina's live show where she reworked the funky studio version into a hard-driving rock and roll showstopper. A live recording of "Nutbush City Limits" from Turner's 1986–1987 Break Every Rule Tour was released as the lead single to promote the 1988 double album Tina Live in Europe, but it was in fact a different recording than the one that appeared on the official concert album. While this version did not manage to register much of an impact on any charts, the single is notable for being one of the first by Turner to be released on compact disc, at that time a relatively new format, in addition to 7" and 3-track 12" vinyl editions.

Both the CD and 12" singles featured a 10-minute 57-second live rendition of ZZ Top's song "Legs" from their 1983 album Eliminator, which was not included on the Tina Live in Europe album. A shorter version of "Legs", recorded during Turner's 1993 What's Love? Tour, would later appear on her 1994 CD box set The Collected Recordings - Sixties to Nineties.

- "Nutbush City Limits" (live) – 3:30
- Tina Live in Europe album track – 3:43

== 1991 remixes ==
Turner re-recorded "Nutbush City Limits" in a modern dance style—subtitled "The 90s Version"—for inclusion on her 1991 compilation album Simply the Best. Upon its release as a single, the song peaked at No. 23 on the UK Singles Chart and was a Top 20 hit in several other European countries. A different rendition, entitled "Nutbush City Limits ('91)", appeared alongside "The 90s Version". This funkier yet more laid-back arrangement is actually the one for which Turner recorded new vocals that were later remixed by producers Chris "C. J." Mackintosh and Dave Dorrell to become "The 90s Version". The 12" single also featured an extended six-minute version of the dance remix, and a limited-release promotional DJ edition from the UK included still another take, "A Little Bit o' Bush". The corresponding music video for "The 90s Version" shows Turner recording the song in studio, intercut with footage of the various landmarks mentioned.

- "Nutbush City Limits (The 90s Version)" – 3:43
- "Nutbush City Limits ('91)" – 4:16
- "Nutbush City Limits (Nutbush City '91)" – 6:00
- "A Little Bit o' Bush" – 5:01

== 1993 re-recording ==
In 1993, Turner re-recorded the track as a re-working of the original studio arrangement for the What's Love Got to Do with It soundtrack album.

== Charts ==
=== Weekly charts ===
Weekly chart performance for "Nutbush City Limits"
Chart (1973–1976)	Peak position
Australia (Kent Music Report)	14
Austria (Ö3 Austria Top 40)	1
Canada Top Singles (RPM)	85
Ireland (IRMA)	18
Netherlands (Dutch Top 40)	12
Netherlands (Single Top 100)	12
New Zealand (Listener)	19
South Africa (Springbok Radio)	9
Spain (Latin American Hit Parade)	9
Switzerland (Schweizer Hitparade)	2
UK Singles (Official Charts)	4
US Billboard Hot 100	22
US Hot Soul Singles (Billboard)	11
US Cash Box Top 100	26
US R&B Top 70 (Cash Box)	16
US Record World Singles	26
US R&B Singles (Record World)	25
West Germany (Official German Charts)	2

Chart (1978)	Peak position
Belgium (Ultratop 50 Flanders)	19
Netherlands (Dutch Top 40)	12

Chart (1988)	Peak position
West Germany (Official German Charts)	45

Chart (1991)	Peak position
Australia (ARIA)	16
Austria (Ö3 Austria Top 40)	25
Belgium (Ultratop 50 Flanders)	12
Europe (European Hot 100 Singles)	31
Europe (European Dance Radio)	19
Europe (European Hit Radio)	21
Finland (Suomen virallinen lista)	28
Germany (Official German Charts)	25
Ireland (IRMA)	12
Italy (Musica e dischi)	9
Luxembourg (Radio Luxembourg)	12
Netherlands (Dutch Top 40)	11
Netherlands (Single Top 100)	15
New Zealand (Recorded Music NZ)	26
Switzerland (Schweizer Hitparade)	12
UK Singles (Official Charts)	23
UK Airplay (Music Week)	9
UK Dance (Music Week)	32
UK Club Chart (Record Mirror)	79

Chart (2023)	Peak position
UK Downloads	56

=== Year-end charts ===
Annual chart rankings for "Nutbush City Limits"
Chart (1973)	Position
UK Singles (OCC)	34

Chart (1974)	Position
Austria (Ö3 Austria Top 40)	8
Switzerland (Schweizer Hitparade)	10
West Germany (Official German Charts)	21

Chart (1976)	Position
Australia (Kent Music Report)	70

Chart (1978)	Position
Netherlands (Dutch Top 40)	80

Chart (1991)	Position
Australia (ARIA)	86
Belgium (Ultratop 50 Flanders)	99
Italy (Musica e dischi)	58
Netherlands (Single Top 100)	95

== Certifications ==
Certifications for "Nutbush City Limits"
Region	Certification	Certified units/sales
New Zealand (RMNZ)	Gold	15,000^{‡}
United Kingdom (BPI) Physical sales	Silver	250,000^{^}
United Kingdom (BPI) Digital sales since 2004	Silver	200,000^{‡}
^{^} Shipments figures based on certification alone.^{‡} Sales+streaming figures based on certification alone.

== Nutbush dance ==
The song has gained cult popularity in Australia, particularly due to the Nutbush dance. The dance is often performed at weddings, school concerts, and bushdances. Turner never performed the dance to the song, although there are similarities between it and performances by Turner and The Ikettes in the seventies. The origins of the dance have been elusive, though in May 2024, ABC News Australia reported on research indicating that the dance routine for the Nutbush was most likely invented by the education department of the state of New South Wales in Australia, having been distributed to teacher training institutions as a teaching aid in 1975.
