= Foreign Affair (Tina Turner song) =

Single by Tina Turner

from the album Foreign Affair
- B-side: "Private Dancer" (live)
- Released: May 1990
- Length: 4:27
- Label: Capitol
- Songwriter: Tony Joe White
- Producers: Tony Joe White; Roger Davies

Tina Turner singles chronology
"Look Me in the Heart" (1990)	"Foreign Affair" (1990)	"Be Tender with Me Baby" (1990)

Music video
- "Foreign Affair" on YouTube

"Foreign Affair" is a song by recording artist Tina Turner. It was written by Tony Joe White and produced by White and Roger Davies for Turner's 1989 album of the same name. Released as a single in 1990, it was released in a variety formats, in certain territories – also as a separate remix single including club mixes by Shep Pettibone.

The cover photo, taken by photographer Peter Lindbergh, features as the artwork for the single. Tina is seen wearing a dress by Tunisian designer Azzedine Alaïa and climbing the Eiffel Tower in high heels.

== Critical reception ==
Pop Rescue complimented Mark Knopfler for "expertly wielding his guitar" on the song, noting that it "has a hard 80's electronic beat to it."

== Track listing ==
- European 7" single
1. "Foreign Affair" (Edit) – 3:44
2. "Private Dancer" (Live) – 4:53
- European CD and 12" single
1. "Foreign Affair" (One In A Million Club Mix) – 6:54
2. "Foreign Affair" (Heartbeat Instrumental) – 4:25
3. "Foreign Affair" (Heartbeat Mix) – 4:24
- European 12" single
1. "Foreign Affair" (Special Feelings Mix) – 4:43
2. "Foreign Affair" (One In A Million Club Mix) – 6:54
3. "Foreign Affair" (Heartbeat Mix) – 4:24
4. "Foreign Affair" (One In A Million Extended Mix) – 7:10
- European CD and 12" single (Re-Mix)
1. "Foreign Affair" (One In A Million Extended Mix) – 7:10
2. "Foreign Affair" (Special Feelings Instrumental) – 4:43
3. "Foreign Affair" (Heartbeat Edit) – 4:00

== Charts ==
Chart (1990)	Peak position
Belgium (Ultratop 50 Flanders)	49
Europe Airplay (Music & Media)	15
Netherlands (Single Top 100)	55
West Germany (GfK)	35

Chart (2017)	Peak position
Poland Airplay (ZPAV)	48
