= The Best (song) =

1988 single by Bonnie Tyler, made popular by Tina Turner in 1989

"The Best" is a song most famously sung by American singer Tina Turner, and first recorded by Welsh singer Bonnie Tyler. The song appears on Tyler's seventh studio album, Hide Your Heart (1988). It was written by Mike Chapman and Holly Knight. Produced by Desmond Child, Tyler's version became a top-10 hit in Norway but was a minor hit elsewhere.

In 1989, Tina Turner released a cover version of "The Best" for her seventh studio album, Foreign Affair. It became a worldwide hit, receiving a double platinum certification in the UK. In 1992, Turner re-recorded the track as a duet with Australian singer Jimmy Barnes.

== Bonnie Tyler version ==
"The Best"

Single by Bonnie Tyler

from the album Hide Your Heart
- B-side: "The Fire Below"
- Released: 18 January 1988
- Genre: Rock
- Length: 4:07
- Label: CBS
- Songwriters: Mike Chapman; Holly Knight
- Producer: Desmond Child

Bonnie Tyler singles chronology
"Lovers Again" (1987)	"The Best" (1988)	"Hide Your Heart" (1988)

Music video
- "The Best" on YouTube

=== Background and release ===
"The Best" was co-written by Mike Chapman and Holly Knight, and first offered to Paul Young, who declined. Bonnie Tyler was the first artist to record it. "The Best" was released as the lead single from her seventh studio album, Hide Your Heart, in January 1988. It peaked at no. 10 in Norway, and no. 25 in Finland, but only spent one week in the UK Singles Chart at no. 95. In Italy, "The Best" peaked at no. 8 on Rai Radio 2's airplay chart.

Tina Turner's subsequent success with "The Best" restored Tyler's confidence in choosing recording material, after both Hide Your Heart and its singles failed to match the commercial success of her previous work. She added that Turner "did it much better than I did".

=== Track listings ===
- European 7-inch single
1. "The Best" – 4:15
2. "The Fire Below" – 5:08
- Dutch and UK 12-inch single
1. "The Best" – 4:15
2. "The Fire Below" – 5:08
3. "Under Suspicion" – 4:24
- UK CD single
1. "The Best" – 4:15
2. "The Fire Below" – 5:08
3. "Under Suspicion" – 4:24

=== Charts ===
Weekly chart performance for "The Best" by Bonnie Tyler
Chart (1988)	Peak position
Finland (Suomen virallinen lista)	25
Italy Airplay (Music & Media)	8
Norway (VG-lista)	10
Spain (AFYVE)	20
UK Singles (Official Charts)	95

== Tina Turner version ==
"The Best"

Single by Tina Turner

from the album Foreign Affair
- B-side: "Bold and Reckless"
- Released: 21 August 1989
- Genre: Rock
- Length: 5:30 (album version); 4:08 (single version)
- Label: Capitol
- Songwriters: Mike Chapman; Holly Knight
- Producers: Tina Turner; Dan Hartman

Tina Turner singles chronology
"634-5789" (live) (1988)	"The Best" (1989)	"I Don't Wanna Lose You" (1989)

Music video
- "The Best" on YouTube

In 1989, American singer and songwriter Tina Turner recorded a cover version of "The Best" for her seventh solo studio album, Foreign Affair (1989), with a saxophone solo played by Edgar Winter. Prior to recording the song, Tina Turner approached the songwriter Holly Knight and requested some changes: the addition of a bridge, which Turner felt was missing, and a key change.

Released as the lead single from Foreign Affair on 21 August 1989, the song was an international success, becoming a top-five hit in numerous countries. It is one of Turner's most recognizable tunes, often considered synonymous with the singer's name. The song was used in a Pepsi commercial featuring Turner, which also served as a promo for her Foreign Affair: The Farewell Tour sponsored by Pepsi. Additionally, the song was adopted by other brands for their advertising including Applebee's and T-Mobile.

The song title is often mistitled as "(Simply) the Best", reflecting a phrase in the chorus. This became so commonplace that the bracketed word 'Simply' was included in the titles for releases of some subsequent versions, and in the track listing for some Tina Turner compilation albums.

In 1990, the song was used for the New South Wales Rugby League premiership (NSWRL) promotional campaign. After appearing in NSWRL's ad a year earlier (with "What You Get Is What You See"), Tina Turner was invited to Sydney, Australia, to shoot the 1990 campaign ads, in which she appears alongside rugby league players, and perform the song at that year's Grand Final. The campaign featuring Tina Turner helped change the perception of rugby league as a sport turning what was essentially a suburban game popular with working-class men into entertainment for the whole family. The song was featured again in the 2020 promotional campaign of NRL, more than 30 years after its release.

The song became associated with Formula One driver Ayrton Senna after Senna's surprise onstage appearance during Turner's performance in the 1993 Australian Grand Prix in Adelaide as part of her What's Love? Tour. The song's association with Senna was further solidified with its usage in the fifth and sixth episodes of the 2024 Senna television miniseries, a biographical drama about Senna's motorsport career.

The song was also used in a 1998 ad for the Toyota Sienna after it became the best performing vehicle ever tested by the IIHS crash test agency at that time. Chris Eubank, a British former two-weight world champion boxer, regularly walked out to the song for his match entrances, and even used it as his boxing nickname.

The song was synonymous in the Teesside area of North East England for its use in the advertising campaigns for local car dealerships South Cleveland Garages using the jingle "Simply the best, South Cleveland Garages, better than all the rest."

=== Critical reception ===
Bill Coleman from Billboard magazine described the song as an "easy-paced pop offering which finds Turner's voice taking front and center stage." The Daily Vault's Mark Millan called it a "sing-along anthem". Pan-European magazine Music & Media stated that the singer's "dramatic range is fully utilised on this impressive and polished production (courtesy Dan Hartman and Turner)." People said it "features such pizza-box lyrics as 'You're simply the best/ Better than all the rest/ Better than anyone/ Anyone I've ever met'." The reviewer also noted that Edgar Winter adds a saxophone solo "with bite". Pop Rescue called the song "flawless", adding that it was probably the fact that it's such a simple song that "helped it to become so widely popular."

=== Association with Rangers and loyalism ===
The Tina Turner version of "The Best" became associated with the Scottish football club Glasgow Rangers after the song was used in a BBC television highlight package celebrating a championship win during the club's nine-in-a-row era of the 1990s. The song has since been played routinely across the public address system before matches at Ibrox Stadium, and the phrase "Simply the Best" has become a Rangers slogan. In 2001, "(Simply) The Best" was removed from the playlist at Ibrox after Rangers supporters had been corrupting the song's lyrics to include anti-Irish and anti-Catholic sectarian references for several years. The song was ultimately reinstated. The loyalist paramilitary Ulster Defence Association (UDA) in Northern Ireland also appropriated "(Simply) The Best" as an anthem, with altered, pro-loyalist lyrics, and as a motto. In 2011, Turner's publicist condemned the UDA's use of the song and derided the paramilitary group as "a bunch of idiots who want to boast about how good they are at killing innocent people".

=== Track listing ===
- Worldwide 7-inch, cassette and CD single
1. "The Best" (Edit) – 4:08
2. "Undercover Agent for the Blues" – 5:17
- UK 7-inch limited single
1. "The Best" (Edit) – 4:08
2. "What's Love Got to Do with It" – 3:49
- European and UK CD and 12-inch single
1. "The Best" – 5:28
2. "Undercover Agent for the Blues" – 5:18
3. "Bold and Reckless" – 3:47
- Australian 12-inch single
1. "The Best" (Extended Mighty Mix) – 6:37
2. "The Best" (Single Muscle Mix) – 4:17
3. "The Best" (Extended Muscle Mix) – 5:28
- 1993 Australian CD single
1. "The Best" (Edit) – 4:09
2. "The Best" (Extended Mighty Mix) – 6:37
3. "The Best" (Single Muscle Mix) – 4:17
4. "The Best" (Extended Muscle Mix) – 5:28

=== Personnel ===
Musicians

- Tina Turner – lead vocals, arrangements
- Dan Hartman – keyboards, acoustic guitar, backing vocals
- Phil Ashley – keyboards, bass pulse
- Elliot Lewis – additional keyboards, strings
- Philippe Saisse – additional keyboards
- Gene Black – rhythm guitar
- James Ralston – rhythm guitar
- Pat Thrall – guitar solo
- T. M. Stevens – bass guitar
- Art Wood – drums
- Edgar Winter – saxophone solo
- Lance Ellington – backing vocals
- Tessa Niles – backing vocals

Production

- Dan Hartman – producer
- Tina Turner – executive producer, producer

Technical

- Chris Lord-Alge – recording engineer
- Vincent Frerebeau – additional engineer
- Bob Ludwig – mastering

=== Charts ===
==== Weekly charts ====
1989 weekly chart performance for "The Best" by Tina Turner
Chart (1989)	Peak position
Australia (ARIA)	4
Austria (Ö3 Austria Top 40)	2
Belgium (Ultratop 50 Flanders)	2
Canada Top Singles (RPM)	4
Canada Adult Contemporary (RPM)	20
Canada Retail Singles (The Record)	3
Denmark (IFPI)	3
Europe (European Hot 100 Singles)	3
Finland (Suomen virallinen lista)	3
France (SNEP)	23
Ireland (IRMA)	4
Italy (Musica e dischi)	3
Italy Airplay (Music & Media)	4
Luxembourg (Radio Luxembourg)	4
Netherlands (Dutch Top 40)	5
Netherlands (Single Top 100)	7
New Zealand (Recorded Music NZ)	28
Norway (VG-lista)	5
Portugal (AFP)	2
Spain (AFYVE)	20
Sweden (Sverigetopplistan)	11
Switzerland (Schweizer Hitparade)	3
UK Singles (Official Charts)	5
US Billboard Hot 100	15
US Cash Box Top 100	12
West Germany (GfK)	4

2010 weekly chart performance for "The Best" by Tina Turner
Chart (2010)	Peak position
Scottish Singles Sales (Official Charts)	1
UK Singles (Official Charts)	9

2013 weekly chart performance for "The Best" by Tina Turner
Chart (2013)	Peak position
Slovenia Airplay (SloTop50)	12

2023 weekly chart performance for "The Best" by Tina Turner
Chart (2023)	Peak position
Australia (ARIA)	29
Global 200 (Billboard)	121
Hungary (Single Top 40)	8
Poland Airplay (OLiS)	39
Portugal (AFP)	159
South Africa Airplay (RISA)	3
Sweden (Sverigetopplistan)	81
UK Singles (Official Charts)	25
UK Sales (OCC)	6

2024 weekly chart performance for "The Best" by Tina Turner
Chart (2024)	Peak position
Poland Airplay (OLiS)	52

2025 weekly chart performance for "The Best" by Tina Turner
Chart (2025)	Peak position
Jamaica Airplay (JAMMS)	1
Poland Airplay (OLiS)	54

2026 weekly chart performance for "The Best" by Tina Turner
Chart (2026)	Peak position
Israel International Airplay (Media Forest)	14
Jamaica Airplay (JAMMS)	1
Poland Airplay (OLiS)	53

==== Year-end charts ====
1989 year-end chart performance for "The Best" by Tina Turner
Chart (1989)	Position
Australia (ARIA)	33
Austria (Ö3 Austria Top 40)	16
Belgium (Ultratop 50 Flanders)	19
Canada Top Singles (RPM)	52
Europe (European Hot 100 Singles)	15
Netherlands (Dutch Top 40)	27
Netherlands (Single Top 100)	49
Norway Autumn Period (VG-lista)	14
Switzerland (Schweizer Hitparade)	27
UK Singles (OCC)	41
West Germany (Media Control)	41

2013 year-end chart performance for "The Best" by Tina Turner
Chart (2013)	Position
Slovenia (SloTop50)	39

=== Certifications and sales ===
Certifications and sales for "The Best" by Tina Turner
Region	Certification	Certified units/sales
Australia (ARIA)	Platinum	70,000^{^}
Denmark (IFPI Danmark)	Platinum	90,000^{‡}
Italy (FIMI)	Gold	25,000^{‡}
New Zealand (RMNZ)	2× Platinum	60,000^{‡}
Portugal (AFP)	Gold	20,000^{‡}
Spain (Promusicae)	Platinum	60,000^{‡}
United Kingdom (BPI) 1989 physical sales	Silver	200,000^{^}
United Kingdom (BPI) sales + streams since 2009	3× Platinum	1,800,000^{‡}
^{^} Shipments figures based on certification alone.^{‡} Sales+streaming figures based on certification alone.

== Tina Turner and Jimmy Barnes version ==
"(Simply) The Best"

Single by Tina Turner and Jimmy Barnes

from the album Simply the Best
- Released: 11 May 1992
- Length: 4:11
- Label: Mushroom
- Songwriters: Mike Chapman, Holly Knight
- Producers: Dan Hartman, Chris Lord-Alge

Tina Turner singles chronology
"I Want You Near Me" (1992)	"(Simply) The Best" (1992)	"I Don't Wanna Fight" (1993)

Jimmy Barnes singles chronology
"Ain't No Mountain High Enough" (1992)	"(Simply) The Best" (1992)	"Sweat It Out" (1993)

In 1992, Turner recorded "(Simply) The Best", a duet version of the song with Australian rock singer Jimmy Barnes, to promote that year's New South Wales Rugby League season in Australia. The single subsequently appeared on a limited edition bonus disc as part of the Australian release of her compilation album Simply the Best (1991).

=== Track listing ===
- Australian 7-inch single
1. "(Simply) The Best" (Tina Turner and Jimmy Barnes) – 4:14
2. "(Simply) The Best" (Extended Version) – 5:29
- Australian cassette and CD single
1. "(Simply) The Best" (Tina Turner and Jimmy Barnes) – 4:14
2. "River Deep, Mountain High" (Jimmy Barnes) – 3:37
3. "I'm a Lady" (Tina Turner) – 3:24
4. "(Simply) The Best" (Extended Version) – 5:29

=== Charts ===
==== Weekly charts ====
Weekly chart performance for "(Simply) The Best"
Chart (1992)	Peak position
Australia (ARIA)	14
New Zealand (Recorded Music NZ)	11

==== Year-end charts ====
Year-end chart performance for "(Simply) The Best"
Chart (1992)	Position
Australia (ARIA)	78

==== Certifications ====
Certifications for "(Simply) The Best"
Region	Certification	Certified units/sales
New Zealand (RMNZ)	Gold	15,000^{‡}
^{‡} Sales+streaming figures based on certification alone.

== Other versions ==
Canadian actor Noah Reid performed a stripped-down acoustic rendition of the song in a fourth season episode of the television sitcom Schitt's Creek. His version reached #1 on the iTunes soundtrack charts within one day of the episode airing.

Canadian singer Jacob Lewis, the winner of the fifth season of Canada's Got Talent, performed the song in the season finale. His rendition started as a slow acoustic ballad resembling Reid's cover, before transitioning into full rock instrumentation closer to the Tyler or Turner versions.
