= I Don't Wanna Lose You =

Single by Tina Turner

from the album Foreign Affair
- B-side: "Not Enough Romance"; "Steel Claw" (live); "Stronger Than the Wind"
- Released: November 6, 1989
- Length: 4:20
- Label: Capitol
- Songwriters: Albert Hammond; Graham Lyle
- Producers: Albert Hammond; Graham Lyle; Roger Davies

Tina Turner singles chronology
"The Best" (1989)	"I Don't Wanna Lose You" (1989)	"Steamy Windows" (1989)

Music video
- "I Don't Wanna Lose You" on YouTube

"I Don't Wanna Lose You" is a song by American-Swiss singer Tina Turner. It was written by Albert Hammond and Graham Lyle and produced along with Roger Davies for Turner's seventh solo studio album, Foreign Affair (1989). It was released as the album's second single in the UK on November 6, 1989 by Capitol Records, and as third single in the rest of Europe and in Australia in early 1990. It became a top-10 hit in Belgium, Luxembourg and the United Kingdom, where it peaked at No. 8 on the UK Singles Chart to become her fifth top-10 single there.

== Critical reception ==
In a 2019 retrospective review, Matthew Hocter from Albumism stated that Turner "delivers some solid club tracks" on Foreign Affair, like "I Don't Wanna Lose You". Bil Carpenter from AllMusic complimented the song as "fine". Upon the release, Rufer & Fell from the Gavin Report commented, "Nothing but the best from Ms. Turner", describing it as "a declaration of possession sung by someone who's experienced her share of "have-nots" in the past." In a 2015 review, Pop Rescue declared it as a "great little track", noting Gary Barnacle's "well placed" blast of saxophone. William Shaw from Smash Hits said, "Actually this is quite good", "a simple, plain, slow yet still sort of perky love song that ambles along in an unsurprising way but which is actually rather charming all the same."

== Track listings ==
- UK and Australian 7-inch and cassette single
1. "I Don't Wanna Lose You" – 4:20
2. "Not Enough Romance" – 4:04
- European 7-inch and CD single
1. "I Don't Wanna Lose You" – 4:19
2. "Steel Claw" (live) – 4:32
- UK CD single
1. "I Don't Wanna Lose You" – 4:20
2. "Stronger Than the Wind" – 3:59
3. "Not Enough Romance" – 4:04
4. "We Don't Need Another Hero (Thunderdome)" – 4:16
- European CD and 12-inch single
1. "I Don't Wanna Lose You" – 4:19
2. "Steel Claw" (live) – 4:32
3. "The Best" (extended Mighty mix) – 6:33
- UK 12-inch single
1. "I Don't Wanna Lose You" – 4:20
2. "Stronger Than the Wind" – 3:59
3. "Not Enough Romance" – 4:04

== Charts ==
=== Weekly charts ===
Chart (1989–1990)	Peak position
Australia (ARIA)	59
Austria (Ö3 Austria Top 40)	20
Belgium (Ultratop 50 Flanders)	9
Europe (European Hot 100 Singles)	36
Ireland (IRMA)	16
Israel (Israeli Singles Chart)	25
Luxembourg (Radio Luxembourg)	6
Netherlands (Dutch Top 40)	24
Netherlands (Single Top 100)	24
Switzerland (Schweizer Hitparade)	30
UK Singles (Official Charts)	8
West Germany (GfK)	38

=== Year-end charts ===
Chart (1989)	Position
UK Singles (OCC)	91

Chart (1990)	Position
Belgium (Ultratop)	71

== Release history ==
Region	Date	Format(s)	Label(s)	Ref.
United Kingdom	November 6, 1989	7-inch vinyl; 12-inch vinyl; CD; cassette	Capitol	
Australia	February 12, 1990	7-inch vinyl; cassette	Interfusion; Festival	
