= Erskine Oglesby =

American saxophonist and singer (1937–2004)

- Born: January 20, 1937; St. Louis, Missouri, U.S.
- Died: March 7, 2004 (aged 67)
- Genres: Blues, R&B
- Occupation(s): Musician, singer
- Instrument(s): Saxophone, vocals
- Labels: Black & Tan Records

Erskine Oglesby (January 20, 1937 – March 7, 2004) was an American tenor saxophonist and blues singer. He was a native of St. Louis and as a teenager he played in a local band with Chuck Berry. He later played with Little Milton, Albert King, and Ike Turner's Kings of Rhythm. Oglesby also recorded as a solo artist and released a few albums on Black & Tan Records.

== Biography ==
Oglesby was born in the St. Louis neighborhood of Mill Creek Valley on January 20, 1937. By the age of 14, he was playing in a local band with guitarist Chuck Berry. Oglesby attended Vashon High School in St. Louis.

As a teenager, Oglesby joined the Air Force near the end of the Korean War. After his service, he joined Billy Gayles' band in 1958. Through Gayles, he met bandleader Ike Turner and joined his Kings of Rhythm as a baritone player and vocalist. Oglesby left the band because he did not wish to tour.

Through the years, Oglesby played saxophone on records by various R&B and blues artists such Ike & Tina Turner, Albert King, Little Milton, and Benny Sharp. Not wanting to limit himself to only R&B and blues, Oglesby also played with local jazz acts including, Terry Williams and the Sound Merchants and the quartet Tres' Bien.

While working as a musician, he also held day jobs as a dishwasher and street worker for the YMCA helping unemployed people find jobs. Oglesby earned a degree in social work and worked with inner city kids.

In 1986 and 1987, Oglesby toured Europe with several original members of the Kings of Rhythm, including Clayton Love, Billy Gayles, Stacy Johnson, Oliver Sain, and former Ikette Robbie Montgomery. They were known as the St. Louis Kings of Rhythm. Mayor Vincent Schoemehl officially appointed them as ambassadors for the City of St. Louis. They recorded a double album for Timeless Records in the Netherlands.

After the blues revival in the 1990s, Oglesby returned to playing music full-time and he released two albums on Black & Tan Records.

Oglesby died on March 7, 2004.

== Discography ==
=== Studio albums ===
- 2000: Blues Dancin' (Black & Tan)
- 2001: Honkin' & Shoutin' (Black & Tan)

=== Album appearances ===
- 2004: Straight Blues 4U (Black & Tan)
- 2005: Keeping Living Music Alive (Black & Tan)
- 2007: Black & Tan Sampler, Vol. 2 (Black & Tan)

=== Albums as a sideman ===
- 1987: St. Louis Kings Of Rhythm – Rhythm And Blues Showtime With St. Louis Kings Of Rhythm (Timeless Records)
- 2000: Tommy Bankhead – Message To St. Louis (Fedora Records)
