= Vernon Guy =

American vocalist (1945–1998)

- Born: March 21, 1945; St. Louis, Missouri, U.S.
- Died: September 10, 1998 (aged 53) St. Louis, Missouri, U.S.
- Genres: R&B, soul, blues
- Labels: Teena; Sonja; Electric Land
- Formerly of: Ike & Tina Turner, the Ikettes, the Sharpees

Vernon Guy (March 21, 1945 – September 10, 1998) was an American R&B vocalist based in St. Louis. Early in his career he toured with bandleader Ike Turner in the Ike & Tina Turner Revue. Guy released a few solo records on Turner's labels before forming the Sharpees with Benny Sharp in the mid 1960s. He later performed with musicians Bennie Smith and Johnnie Johnson.

== Life and career ==
Guy was born in St. Louis on March 21, 1945. He began singing gospel music with his brother in the vocal group the Seven Gospel Singers. Inspired by singer Frankie Lymon, Guy began singing secular music and the group was renamed the Cool Sounds. The Cool sounds competed in local talent shows. They won Dave Dixon's "Shower of Stars," sponsored by KATZ at Kiel Auditorium. The prize was supposed to be a recording session, but that didn't materialize. The group continued performing, now at local clubs in St. Louis and East St. Louis. They had gigs at the Manhattan Club, the Riviera, the Dynaflow and the Red Top with the bands of musicians Albert King, Little Milton, and Oliver Sain.

In 1961, Guy's saw his friend, Stacy Johnson, singing with Benny Sharp and the Zorros of Rhythm at the Club Caravan (formerly Early Bird Lounge). Johnson introduced Guy to Sharp who had him sing "Shout" by the Isley Brothers. Impressed, Sharp offered him a job in his band. Guy and Johnson, along with singer Horise O'Toole became known as New Breed.

One day at the Club Caravan, bandleader Ike Turner's vocalist Jimmy Thomas introduced Johnson and Guy to Turner, who at the recommendation of Ikette Robbie Montgomery, asked Guy and Johnson to join the Ike & Tina Turner Revue. Turner went home with Guy to ask his mother and grandmother permission for him to tour. Initially Guy sang backup in the revue, but after a few weeks on the road, Guy and Johnson recorded their first records for Turner at his home in East St. Louis. Guy released his first record on Turner's label Teena Records in 1963. The revue toured at a grueling pace. He was getting fed up with doing roadie work, and while in Fort Smith, Arkansas for a gig he discovered that he was owed royalties. He left the revue without informing Turner and returned to St. Louis. After a few days, he was contacted by Jimmy Thomas who told him Turner wanted him back. Guy rejoined the revue in Detroit. After returning, Guy and Johnson were featured more. They recorded together as Vernon & Stacy, releasing the single "The Hunter And The Rabbit" / "My Life Time Love" on Turner's label Sonja Records in 1963.

Weary of the touring and in love with a girl back home, Guy left the revue in 1964. In St. Louis, he returned to Benny Sharp, forming the Sharpees. They signed to George Leaner's One-derful Records based in Chicago and released their first single, "Do the 45," which was a modest hit in 1965. The band released a few more singles and continued to perform through the 1970s with changing lineups. In 1978, Sharp quit performing and turned to religion. In 1985, Guy briefly revived the Sharpees with Johnson which included Guy's nephew Paul Grady in the band. After their dissolution, Guy continued to perform primarily as a solo artist around St. Louis. He still performed with Johnson occasionally as well as musicians Bennie Smith and Johnnie Johnson.

Guy died in an automobile accident in St. Louis on September 10, 1998.

== Discography ==
=== Singles ===
- 1963: "You've Got Me (Just Where You Want Me)" / "They Ain't Lovin' Ya" (Teena 1703)
- 1963: "The Hunter And The Rabbit" / "My Life Time Love" (Sonja 2002)
- 1964: "Anything - To Make It With You" / "Walking Down The Isle" (Sonja 2007)
- 1980: "My Brand New Woman" / "Ooh Vernon" (Electric Land 811020)

=== Albums ===
==== Ike & Tina Turner ====
- 1964: Ike & Tina Turner Revue Live (Kent Records)
- 1965: Live! The Ike & Tina Turner Show (Warner Bros. Records)
- 2004: The Bad Man: Rare & Unreissued Ike Turner Produced Recordings 1962-1965 (Night Train International)
- 2012: Ike Turner Studio Productions: New Orleans and Los Angeles 1963–1965 (Ace Records)

==== Other appearances ====
- 1999: West Coast Modern Blues 1960's (P-Vine Records)
- 2013: New Breed Blues With Black Popcorn (Kent Dance)
