= Clara McDaniel =

American blues singer and songwriter

- Born: November 26, 1948 (age 77); Pontiac, Michigan, United States
- Genres: Blues
- Occupations: Singer, songwriter
- Instrument: Vocals
- Years active: 1970s–present
- Label: HighTone Records

Clara McDaniel (born November 26, 1948) is an American blues singer and songwriter. She released her debut album, Unwanted Child, in 1997 and has worked with notable blues musicians including Albert King, Tommy Bankhead, Bobby Bland, Little Milton, Oliver Sain, and Ike Turner.

== Life and career ==
McDaniel was born in Pontiac, Michigan, United States, and raised in a musical family. Her uncle, Dusty Brown, played the harmonica and recorded for Parrot Records in the 1950s, releasing a single "Yes She's Gone" b/w "He Don't Love You" (Parrot 820). She sang and played the piano at her local church. She moved with her family in 1966 to St. Louis, Missouri, and here as a teenager McDaniel met Muddy Waters.

Her musical education continued as she frequented a string of nightclubs including Ned Love's, Club Caravan, Cass, and Dynaflow at Glasgow. She performed alongside Big Bad Smitty and Big George at Club Caravan, but more significantly for her future career, she teamed up with Albert King at Ned Love's. This led to her touring with King in the Deep South in the 1970s. When McDaniel returned home she managed King's fleet of taxicabs. She later performed with Tommy Bankhead, Bobby Bland, Little Milton, Oliver Sain, and Ike Turner among others. Over that period she had to combine two or three jobs, with her singing being mainly restricted to weekends. Billed as Big Clara and the Magnatones, she performed at the St. Louis Blues Festival and, in 1995, appeared at the Blues Estafette in the Netherlands as part of a European tour.

In 1997, McDaniel recorded her debut album, Unwanted Child, which was released on HighTone Records. It followed a family tragedy, as her husband and the keyboard player in her backing band, the Magnatones, Albert "Falstaff" Foster, (1941–1997) had died earlier the same year. McDaniel subsequently moved to Arkansas, where she gave birth to twins. Her maternal instincts extended to becoming a foster mother for many children, some of whom she adopted.

Blues & Rhythm, a monthly British-based blues magazine, named McDaniel 'Discovery of the Year', and in 1998, she was nominated as Living Blues 'Female Blues Artist of the Year'.

== Discography ==
=== Albums ===
Year	Title	Record label
1997	Unwanted Child	HighTone Records

== See also ==
- List of electric blues musicians
