= Jessie Smith (singer) =

American R&B vocalist (1941–2021)

- Smith in 1965

Background information
- Also known as: Little Miss Jessie; Jessie David; Jessie Smith Lucas
- Born: November 28, 1941; Clarksdale, Mississippi, U.S.
- Died: February 4, 2021 (aged 79) Alton, Illinois, U.S.
- Genre: R&B
- Occupation: Singer

Jessie Smith (November 28, 1941 – February 4, 2021) was an American R&B vocalist. She began her career singing with musician Benny Sharp, recording as Little Miss Jessie, and became best known as one of the original Ikettes in the Ike & Tina Turner Revue. She later sang backing vocals for various artists, including Dr. John, Paul Williams, Al Kooper, José Feliciano, and Leon Ware.

== Biography ==
Jessie Smith was born in Clarksdale, Mississippi, the daughter of Georgia and Israel Smith, and was raised in Alton, Illinois. She was a member of the Belle Street Temple Church Of God In Christ, under the leadership of Superintendent R.J. Monroe, and sang gospel solos and with choirs as a teenager. She was a part of The Monroe-Ettes, a female gospel group, with Missionary Norma Smith and Wanda Thompson.

After winning a local talent show at the age of 16, she occasionally sang background vocals for such visiting musicians as Albert King and Ike Turner. In 1961, she was recruited by bandleader Benny Sharp and his band the Zorros of Rhythm in St. Louis. Sharp's band included New Breed, a vocal trio consisting of Stacy Johnson, Vernon Guy, and Horise O'Toole. Backed by Sharp and his band, Smith released the single, "My Baby Has Gone" / "St. Louis Sunset Twist," on Chicago's Mel-O Records under the name Little Miss Jessie in 1961.

By 1962, Smith, Johnson, and Guy had left Sharp to join the Ike & Tina Turner Revue which had relocated to Los Angeles. Smith along with Robbie Montgomery whom she knew from St. Louis and Venetta Fields (a gospel singer from Buffalo, New York) formed the first official incarnation of the Ikettes. The revue toured throughout the country performing a grueling schedule of one-nighters. They performed at prominent venues such as the Apollo Theater in New York, the Howard Theatre in Washington, D.C., and the Uptown Theater in Philadelphia. Smith briefly quit and was replaced by Bonnie Bramlett, after Ike Turner fired her boyfriend Sam Rhodes, who was the bass player in the Kings of Rhythm.

As an Ikette, Smith performed on the television shows American Bandstand, Hollywood A Go-Go, and Shindig!. Two of the Ikettes' biggest hits were released on Modern Records in 1965, "Peaches 'N' Cream" (Pop No. 36, R&B No. 28) and "I'm So Thankful" (Pop No. 74, R&B No. 12).

Smith, Fields and Montgomery left the revue in 1965. Prevented by Turner from using the name Ikettes, they formed the Mirettes in 1966, named after their new label Mirwood Records. They released a few singles, including "In the Midnight Hour" (Pop No. 45, R&B No. 18) in 1968. After they disbanded, Smith continued to record as a backing vocalist in the 1970s, with singers including Al Kooper, Bryan Ferry, and Jose Feliciano. On occasion she teamed up with Robbie Montgomery for sessions, such as the recording of Dr. John's albums In The Right Place (1973), Triumvirate, (1973), and Desitively Bonnaroo (1974).

After her R&B career, she settled in California, married Edward Lucas, and raised her family. In 1990, she returned to her gospel roots at the Monroe Memorial Church in Alton, Illinois, under Bishop Samuel E. White, where she continued to sing.

She died on February 4, 2021, aged 79.

== Discography ==
=== Singles ===
- 1961: "My Baby Has Gone" / "St. Louis Sunset Twist: (Mel-O 101)

=== Albums featured as an Ikette/Mirette ===
- 1965: Live! The Ike & Tina Turner Show
- 1967: The Ike & Tina Turner Show (Vol. 2)
- 1966: Soul The Hits (Modern Records)
- 1968: In The Midnight Hour (Revue Records)
- 1969: Whirlpool (Uni Records)
- 2004: The Bad Man: Rare & Unreissued Ike Turner Produced Recordings 1962-1965 (Night Train International)
- 2012: Ike Turner Studio Productions: New Orleans and Los Angeles 1963–1965 (Ace Records)

=== Backing vocal credits ===
- 1971: Al Kooper – New York City (You're a Woman)
- 1973: Bryan Ferry – These Foolish Things
- 1973: Dr. John – In the Right Place
- 1973: Mike Bloomfield / John Paul Hammond / Dr. John – Triumvirate
- 1973: Gloria Jones – Share My Love
- 1974: Badger – White Lady
- 1974: Dr. John – Desitively Bonnaroo
- 1974: José Feliciano – Compartments
- 1974: Paul Williams – A Little Bit of Love
- 1975: Johnny Bristol – Feeling the Magic
- 1976: Leon Ware – Musical Massage
