= Stacy Johnson (singer) =

American singer-songwriter (1945–2017)

- Born: April 13, 1945; St. Louis, Missouri, U.S.
- Died: May 11, 2017 (aged 72) St. Louis, Missouri, U.S.
- Genres: Soul music, R&B, blues
- Occupation: Singer-songwriter
- Labels: Sony; Sonja; M-Pac!; Modern
- Formerly of: Ike & Tina Turner, the Ikettes, Kings of Rhythm, Benny Sharp, New Breed, Broadway Rhythm

Stacy Johnson (April 13, 1945 – May 11, 2017) was an American R&B singer and songwriter best known as a vocalist in the Ike & Tina Turner Revue. Johnson also released solo records and sang in the St. Louis based group the Sharpees led by Benny Sharp.

== Life and career ==
Johnson was born in St. Louis, Missouri on April 13, 1945. Johnson, the oldest of six, began singing in locals groups around Soldan High School. Johnson admired Frankie Lymon and the Teenagers, the Spaniels, and Little Anthony and the Imperials. In 1958, he joined the doo-wop group the Superiors. They began appearing in local talent shows. The Superiors competed against other groups with Oliver Sain's band backing them. Dave Dixon, a popular disc jockey at KATZ, hosted "Shower of Stars," a competition for aspiring singers and musicians. At one of those shows, Johnson befriended another singer named Vernon Guy from The Cool Sounds. Although underage, the group was permitted to perform at clubs like the Whirlaway, the Red Top, and the Manhattan Club, backed by the house band which was often Oliver Sain, Little Milton or James DeShay. Eventually, Johnson left the group to join the Arabians.

The Arabians joined the Jules Carlos Revue which featured a bevy of talent plying behind Benny Sharp and the Zorros of Rhythm. In 1961, R&B guitarist and bandleader Benny Sharp heard Johnson sing Joe Tex's "All I Could Do Was Cry." Impressed, Sharp hired Johnson as his roadie and gave him an opportunity to sing in his band. Johnson introduced Sharp to his friend Vernon Guy and along with singer Horise O'Toole they became called New Breed. During this period, Johnson also sang with blues guitarist Albert King and harmonica player Big George Brock.

In 1962, while performing with King at Club Caravan (formerly Early Bird Lounge), Jimmy Thomas introduced Johnson and Guy to bandleader Ike Turner who asked Johnson and Guy to join the Ike & Tina Turner Revue. Johnson later learned that Ikette Robbie Montgomery had recommended him to Turner. Johnson accepted Turner's offer, but he learned that he was being tested for a few weeks, and Turner only intended on keeping only one of them. Turner chose Guy, but one night when the revue was performing at the Manhattan Club, the crowd chanted for Johnson so he was rehired. Johnson eventually moved to Los Angeles.

As a member of the revue, Stacy served as master of ceremonies, back up singer and occasionally he sang lead. He appeared with Freddie King, Johnnie Taylor and one of his idols Jackie Wilson. The revue toured throughout the country eleven months out of the year and performed four to seven days of the week. In between touring, Turner recorded the vocalist in the revue. In 1963, Johnson released his first record on Turner's label Sony Records. Johnson and Guy teamed up as Vernon & Stacy for the single "The Hunter And The Rabbit" / "My Life Time Love," released on Turner's label Sonja Records. Johnson also released a solo record on the newly revived Modern Records in 1964.

Johnson stated in a 2000 interview that he contributed to the dynamic of Ike & Tina Turner's act: "There was a minimum amount of dancing being done with the Ike and Tina show, and upon Vernon [Guy] and I going, the whole show changed, because we interjected 90 percent – and I stand convinced of this – 90 percent of the dance routines that they did as a whole group."

Johnson got married in 1964. By this time, he was feeling overworked and underpaid. Due to the urging of his wife, he quit the revue while they were in Dallas, Texas. He moved back to St. Louis and rejoined Sharp's group which was now called the Sharpees. The Sharpees consisted of Herbert Reeves, Horise O'Toole, Vernon Guy and Benny Sharp. Johnson replaced O'Toole who died shortly after contracting tuberculosis. Johnson had previously sang with O'Toole and Reeves in the Arabians. They released "Tired of Being Lonely" on Chicago's One-derful label in 1965, featuring Johnson on lead vocal.

Throughout the 1960s and the 1970s, Johnson performed with various bands around St. Louis. He retired from singing after his second wife died in the early 1980s. In 1985, Johnson and Vernon Guy formed a newly reformed Sharpies. In 1986, former Ikette Robbie Montgomery reached out to him to tour Europe with several Kings of Rhythm alumni, including Clayton Love, Billy Gayles, Erskine Oglesby, and Oliver Sain as the St. Louis Kings of Rhythm. They toured into 1987 and the band was officially appointed as ambassadors for the City of St. Louis by Mayor Vincent Schoemehl. After the tour, Johnson formed the group Broadway Rhythm. Johnson contributed vocals to musician's Johnnie Johnson's first solo album Blue Hand Johnnie (1987).

Johnson continued to perform around St. Louis with the likes of Bennie Smith, Soul Reunion, and Broadway Rhythm until his health declined. In the last 10 years of his life, Johnson suffered from three strokes. One of his last appearances was a fundraiser for him at BB's Jazz, Blues and Soups in 2012. Johnson died in St. Louis at the age of 72 from cancer on May 11, 2017.

== Discography ==
=== Singles ===
- 1963: "Don't Believe 'Em" / "Remove My Doubts" (Sony 113)
- 1963: "The Hunter And The Rabbit" / "My Life Time Love" (Sonja 2002) – Vernon & Stacy
- 1964: "Don't Believe Him" / "Consider Yourself" (Modern 1001)
- 1966: "I Stand Alone" / "Don't try To Fool Me" (M-Pac! 7230)

=== Albums ===
==== Ike and Tina Turner ====
- 1964: Ike & Tina Turner Revue Live (Kent Records)
- 1965: Live! The Ike & Tina Turner Show (Warner Bros. Records)
- 1993: The Ike & Tina Turner Revue Live!!! (Kent Records)
- 1994: I Like Ike! The Best Of Ike Turner (Rhino Records)
- 2012: Ike Turner Studio Productions: New Orleans and Los Angeles 1963–1965 (Ace Records)

==== Other appearances ====
- 1986: Rhythm And Blues Showtime With St. Louis Kings Of Rhythm (Timeless Records)
- 1987: Blue Hand Johnnie (Pulsar Records) – Johnnie Johnson
- 1999: West Coast Modern Blues 1960's (P-Vine Records)
- 2012: Move with the Groove (Hardcore Chicago Soul 1962–1970) (Charly Records)
- 2019: Los Angeles Soul Volume 2 (Kent-Modern's Black Music Legacy 1963–1972) (Kent Soul)
