= Robbie Montgomery =

American singer and restaurateur (born 1940)

- Born: June 16, 1940 (age 86); Columbus, Mississippi, U.S.
- Origin: St. Louis, Missouri, U.S.
- Genres: Soul, R&B
- Occupations: Singer, restaurateur
- Labels: Teena Records, Modern Records, Mirwood Records, Uni Records
- Formerly of: the Ikettes, the Mirettes

Robbie Montgomery (born June 16, 1940) is an American singer and restaurateur. She was one of the original Ikettes in the Ike & Tina Turner Revue in the 1960s. After leaving the group, she was a founding member of the Mirettes before becoming a "Night Tripper" for Dr. John. In the 1970s, Montgomery was a backing vocalist for several acts, including Stevie Wonder, Barbra Streisand, the Rolling Stones, and Joe Cocker. She later operated the Sweetie Pie's restaurant franchise and starred in the award-winning reality series Welcome to Sweetie Pie's.

== Early life ==
Robbie Marie Montgomery was born on June 16, 1940, in Columbus, Mississippi, to Ora Gray and James Montgomery. They lived with her great-grandmother Miss Pathenia, who was an American Indian. When she was six years old, her family moved to St. Louis, Missouri. She grew up in the Pruitt-Igoe projects as the oldest of nine siblings. Her siblings are James, Walter, Robert, George, Everett, Linda and Janice. Montgomery was raised a Baptist but is now a Methodist. She sang in the church choir, and dropped out of the 11th grade to sing professionally in 1958.

== Music career ==
"Ike was a business man and a professional and Tina was an employee, just like we were employees. Being around Ike, we called it the Turner University because we learned so much. A lot of the stuff Ike taught us about business, I’ve applied to my own business: being on time, being prepared, and being professional. And I think Tina runs her ship today with some of the things Ike taught too."

— Robbie Montgomery (2012)

Montgomery and two neighborhood friends Frances Hodges and Sandra Harding, started a doo-wop singing group called the Chordettes, which evolved into the Rhythmettes, and they started appearing in talent shows. A local singer named Art Lassiter hired them as backup singers and they became the Artettes. Lassiter sang with bandleader Ike Turner and his Kings of Rhythm. Turner wrote a song, "A Fool in Love," for Lassiter. When Art Lassiter didn't show up for a recording session at Technisonic Studios in March 1960, Turner took the Artettes and had them accompany his backup vocalist Little Ann (Tina Turner) on the track.

"A Fool In Love," was released in July 1960 on Sue Records and became a hit, peaking at No. 27 on the Billboard Hot 100 and No. 2 on the Billboard Hot R&B Sides. Turner formed the Ike & Tina Turner Revue, but with a new group of backup singers: Delores Johnson, Eloise Hester, and Jo Armstead. Montgomery was pregnant and unable to tour. After having her baby in 1961, Montgomery toured with blues musician Earl Hooker before she returned to Ike & Tina Turner. During her hiatus she sang with the group Benny Sharp & the New Breed who had another female vocalist named Jessie Smith. Montgomery and Smith along with Venetta Fields (a gospel singer from Buffalo) formed the first official incarnation of The Ikettes. In 1962, Montgomery released her first single,"Crazy In Love" / "Pee Wee" on Turner's Teena Records label.

The Ike & Tina Turner Revue performed a grueling schedule of one-nighters on the Chitlin Circuit in the segregated south, and recorded constantly, but Montgomery recalled those times fondly. "We had good times. We would gamble, sing, dance, all the way to the next gig," she later told St. Louis Magazine. In 1962, Turner relocated the Ike & Tina Turner Revue to California. In 1963, Montgomery released her debut single "Crazy in Love."

In 1965, the Ikettes released two of their biggest hits on Modern Records, "Peaches 'N' Cream" (Pop No. 36, R&B No. 28) and "I'm So Thankful" (Pop No. 74, R&B No. 12). As an Ikette, Montgomery performed on the television shows American Bandstand, Hollywood A Go-Go, and Shindig!.

Montgomery, Smith and Fields left the Ike & Tina Turner Revue in 1965. After trying unsuccessfully to continue using the name the Ikettes under management of Tina Turner's sister, Alline Bullock, they changed their name to the Mirettes after their new label Mirwood Records. Their debut single release did not chart and they later signed with Revue Records. In 1968, they had success with the single "In the Midnight Hour" (Pop No. 45, R&B No. 18). They sang on The Lost Man soundtrack produced by Quincy Jones in 1969.

Montgomery eventually left the Mirettes to join Dr. John as a "Night Tripper" in the 1970s. She provided backing vocals for variety of acts, including Barbra Streisand, Debbie Reynolds, Joe Cocker and Stevie Wonder. In the 1970s, she was diagnosed with sarcoidosis, which required lung surgery and derailed her singing career.

In 1986 and 1987, Montgomery toured Europe with former members of the Kings of Rhythm, including Jimmy Hinds, Clayton Love, Billy Gayles, Erskine Oglesby, Stacy Johnson and Oliver Sain, as part of the St. Louis Kings of Rhythm. The band was officially appointed as ambassadors for the City of St. Louis.

In 2018, Montgomery released her debut album, Miss Robbie's What They Call Me, which was her first release in 40 years. The album includes songs that are mixture of soul, blues and country. Montgomery worked on the project with St. Louis-based producer and engineer Carl Nappa. In 2021, Montgomery released the single "Ain't My Stuff Good Enough," produced by Maurice Wilson.

Montgomery continues to perform occasionally. In August 2026, she performed at the Blue Strawberry in St. Louis.

== Sweetie Pie's ==
After Montgomery's lung collapsed, which prevented her from singing, she moved back to St. Louis from California and became a dialysis technician. Eventually she took her mother's soul food recipes, and created the soul food restaurant, Sweetie Pie's, run by herself and her family. The first restaurant, in Dellwood, Missouri, opened in 1996. Montgomery hired men out of prison looking for jobs to work in her restaurant.

Welcome to Sweetie Pies, a reality show which focused on Montgomery running her soul food restaurants, premiered on OWN on October 15, 2011.

In 2015, Montgomery was featured in the book The People's Place: Soul Food Restaurants and Reminiscences from the Civil Rights Era to Today. Montgomery told author Dave Hoekstra that managing her own restaurant gave her new appreciation for her former boss Ike Turner. "Back then we all thought he was mean. You had to rehearse. He had his rules. You couldn't have runs in your stockings. But now that I am running a business I know exactly where he was coming from." Before Turner died in 2007, he visited Sweetie Pie's and tipped Montgomery fifty-dollars.

In 2016, Montgomery sued her son Tim Norman for stealing money and violating her Sweetie Pie's trademark to open competing restaurants, and, in 2017, Montgomery filed a motion to enforce a settlement agreement.

In January 2020, Sweetie Pie's opened a new location in Jackson, Mississippi. Montgomery and Bobby Rush performed at the grand opening. The last Sweetie Pie's in St. Louis closed in 2022, followed by the Jacksonville in 2023.

In 2024, Montgomery announced plans to invest approximately $7 million in a development on Martin Luther King Drive in St. Louis. The proposed project includes a new Sweetie Pie's restaurant restaurant, an event space called Sweetie Pie's 2nd Act, and additional commercial and residential spaces. As of 2026, construction was underway on the development.

== Accolades ==
In the 1980s, Mayor Vincent Schoemehl appointed the St. Louis Kings of Rhythm, which included Montgomery, ambassadors for the City of St. Louis.

In 2010, George Lombardi, the director of the Missouri Department of Corrections, presented Montgomery with a plaque honoring her for her willingness to help ex-offenders.

Welcome to Sweetie Pie's won the NAACP Image Award for Best Reality Series in both 2013 and 2016.

== Personal life ==
Montgomery had a son, Andre Montgomery (1961–1995), with Art Lassiter. Her grandson, Andre Montgomery Jr. (1994–2016), was featured on her show and was murdered in a shooting in 2016.

Montgomery's son, James Timothy Norman, was born in 1979. At the age of 17, in 1997, Norman and another teenager were charged with a series of felonies and accused of robbing at gunpoint two McDonald's and an auto parts store in Florissant, Missouri. He spent several years in prison, and by 2011, when the family's reality show premiered, Norman was working for his mother at Sweetie Pie's. He has a son with his former fiancée born in 2011. Norman managed the Sweetie Pie's restaurant on Manchester Avenue in St. Louis, and later co-owned a location in Jackson, Mississippi where he lived. In 2018, Norman was arrested for an incident in 2017 in which he was accused of punching his ex-restaurant employee.

On August 18, 2020, Norman was arrested in Jackson for his alleged role in a murder-for-hire plot connected to the 2016 killing of his nephew, Andre Montgomery Jr. Reports indicated that Norman, who faced federal charges and was identified as the sole beneficiary of an insurance policy on Andre, orchestrated the scheme and recruited several individuals—including Memphis exotic dancer Terica Ellis—to carry it out. Ellis, along with co-conspirators Travell Anthony Hill and Waiel Rebhi Yaghnam, later pleaded guilty to conspiracy to commit murder. Norman's trial began on September 6, 2022. After 17 hours of deliberation, the jury found him guilty on September 16, 2022. He was sentenced to life in prison on March 2, 2023.

== Discography ==
=== Singles ===
- 1963: "Crazy In Love" / "Pee Wee" (Teena 1701)

=== Albums ===
- 2018: Miss Robbie's What They Call Me

==== Featured as an Ikette/Mirette ====
- 1964: Ike & Tina Turner Revue Live (Kent Records)
- 1965: Live! The Ike & Tina Turner Show (Warner Bros Records)
- 1965: Fine Fine Fine (Stateside Records)
- 1967: The Ike & Tina Turner Show (Vol. 2) (Loma Records)
- 1966: Soul The Hits (Modern Records)
- 1968: In The Midnight Hour (Revue Records)
- 1969: Whirlpool (Uni Records)
- 1987: Fine Fine Fine (Kent Records)
- 1987: St. Louis Kings Of Rhythm (Timeless Records)
- 2004: The Bad Man: Rare & Unreissued Ike Turner Produced Recordings 1962–1965 (Night Train International)
- 2007: Can't Sit Down... 'Cos It Feels So Good: The Complete Modern Recordings (Kent Records)

=== Backing vocal credits ===
- 1971: New York City (You're a Woman) – Al Kooper
- 1972: Souvenirs – Alex Harvey
- 1972: Bad But Not Evil – Marjoe
- 1972: Dr. John's Gumbo – Dr. John
- 1973: In the Right Place – Dr. John
- 1973: Triumvirate – Mike Bloomfield, John Hammond Jr. and Dr. John
- 1973: Truth – King Hannibal
- 1973: Sharon Cash – Sharon Cash
- 1973: Brenda Patterson – Brenda Patterson
- 1973: These Foolish Things – Bryan Ferry
- 1974: Compartments – José Feliciano
- 1974: White Lady – Badger
- 1974: Desitively Bonnaroo – Dr. John
- 1974: Browning Bryant – Browning Bryant
- 1975: Hollywood Be Thy Name – Dr. John
- 1975: Home Plate – Bonnie Raitt
- 1976: Feelin' Free – Hap Palmer
- 1977: A Period of Transition – Van Morrison
- 1988: Have Mercy – Eddie Kirkland
- 2006: Roots, Blues & Jazz – Bonnie Bramlett

== Books ==
- Sweetie Pie's Cookbook: Soulful Southern Recipes, from My Family to Yours (2015)
