= The Bad Man: Rare & Unreissued Ike Turner Produced Recordings 1962–1965 =

The Bad Man

Compilation album by Ike Turner
- Released: 2004
- Recorded: 1962–1965
- Genre: Blues; R&B; soul
- Label: Night Train International
- Producer: Ike Turner; Aaron Fuchs (reissue producer)

Ike Turner chronology
The Sun Sessions (2001)	The Bad Man (2004)	His Woman, Her Man: The Ike Turner Diaries (2004)

The Bad Man: Rare & Unreissued Ike Turner Produced Recordings 1962–1965 is a collection of singles produced by musician Ike Turner. The album was released by Night Train International in 2004.

== Content ==
In the early '60s, the Ike & Tina Turner Revue performed rigorously on the Chitlin' Circuit and built a reputation as "one of the most potent live acts on the R&B circuit." To assure he always had a record out while on tour, Ike Turner formed multiple labels: Teena (named after his wife Tina Turner), Prann, Innis, Sony, and Sonja Records. He released a handful of singles from vocalist within the Revue such as Robbie Montgomery, Vernon Guy, and Jimmy Thomas, and he recorded other artists including Fontella Bass and George Jackson.

A few of the recordings on The Bad Man charted upon their release. "No Bail In This Jail (Prisoner In Love)" by the Ikettes reached No. 126 on Bubbling Under The Hot 100 in 1963. "So Fine" by Ike & Tina and the Ikettes reached No. 50 on the Billboard R&B Singles chart and No. 117 on Bubbling Under The Hot 100 in 1968.

== Critical reception ==
Professional ratings
Review scores
Source	Rating
AllMusic	3.5/5 stars

Reviewing The Bad Man for AllMusic, Tim Sendra wrote:

None of the labels (Innis, Prann, Sonja, Sony, or Teena) amounted to much commercially, but quite a few of the sides on this disc stack up well against the hits Ike & Tina were having at the time for Sue. All of them have the quick and nasty sound that Ike always favors. Fidelity and a crisp clean sound were never priorities for Turner; instead, he wanted excitement and sweat, and that is what he usually got. The most successful and fully realized songs on The Bad Man feature Tina, as she was the perfect foil for Ike's clattering wall of sound.

== Track listing ==
All tracks written by Ike Turner, except where indicated.

No.	Title	Writer(s)	Label & Cat #	Length
1.	"The Drag" (Ike & Dee Dee Johnson)		Innis 3002	2:21
2.	"Crazy In Love" (Robbie Montgomery and the Ike-ettes)		Teena 1701	2:54
3.	"So Fine" (Ike & Tina Turner and the Ikettes)	Johnny Otis	Innis 6667	2:38
4.	"Prisoner In Love" (The Ikettes)		Teena 1702	2:11
5.	"If I Can't Be First" (Ike & Tina Turner)		Sonja 2001	2:14
6.	"Here's Your Heart" (Ike & Tina Turner)	Lee Hazlewood, Marshall Leib	Innis 3000	2:05
7.	"Pee Wee" (Robbie Montgomery and the Ike-ettes)		Teena 1701	2:16
8.	"So Blue Over You" (Ike & Tina Turner and the Ikettes)		Innis 6667	2:34
9.	"I'm Going Back Home" (Ike & Tina Turner)		Sonja 2001	1:43
10.	"My Good Loving" (Fontella Bass)	Oliver Sain	Prann 5005	2:25
11.	"Those Words" (The Ikettes)		Teena 1702	1:51
12.	"Anything To Make It With You" (Vernon Guy)		Sonja 2007	2:10
13.	"You Can't Have Your Cake (And Eat It Too)" (Ike & Dee Dee Johnson)		Innis 3002	2:57
14.	"Gettin' Away" (The Turnabouts)		Prann 5002	2:05
15.	"Cott'n Pick'n" (The Turnabouts)		Prann 5002	2:18
16.	"I Love The Man" (Fontella Bass)	Oliver Sain	Prann 5005	2:36
17.	"The Bad Man" (Bobby John)		Sony 111	2:12
18.	"Lonely Soldier" (Bobby John)	Curtis Mayfield	Sony 111	2:45
19.	"I Love Nobody But You" (Jimmy Thomas)		Sonja 2004	2:29
20.	"Won't Nobody Cha-Cha With Me" (George Jackson)		Prann 5003	2:48
