= Venetta Fields =

American-Australian singer (born 1941)

- Also known as: Vanetta Fields
- Born: Venetta Lee Fields; 1941 (age 84–85); Buffalo, New York, U.S.
- Genres: R&B; pop; rock
- Occupations: Singer; musical theater actress; vocal coach
- Instrument: Vocals
- Years active: 1961–present
- Labels: Sony; Grit; Drumlake Pty. Ltd.

Venetta Lee Fields (born 1941) is an American-Australian singer, musical theatre actress, and vocal coach. She began her career singing in church and local gospel groups in Buffalo, New York, before gaining prominence in the 1960s as an Ikette with the Ike & Tina Turner Revue. After leaving the group in 1965, she co-founded the Mirettes in 1966 and later became a founding member of the vocal trio the Blackberries.

Fields went on to establish a prolific career as a session and touring backing vocalist, working with artists including Pink Floyd, the Rolling Stones, Humble Pie, Barbra Streisand, Neil Diamond, Steely Dan, Boz Scaggs, Bob Seger. After emigrating to Australia in 1982, she became an Australian citizen and continued her career there, performing and recording with artists such as John Farnham, Jimmy Barnes, Cold Chisel, Australian Crawl, and Tim Finn.

== Life and career ==
=== Early life ===
Fields was born in Buffalo, New York in 1941, into a religious family. Her early musical training was from regular gospel performances at church. Her inspiration was Aretha Franklin. Fields singing career began with the Templaires, a group she formed with members of her church, followed by the Corinthian Gospel Singers.

=== The Ike & Tina Turner Revue and the Mirettes ===
Fields left home at 19 to join the Ike & Tina Turner Revue as an Ikette, a decision she made without initially informing her religious family. As she later recalled, she "stole away into the night" and left a note, only contacting her mother a month later, who ultimately told her, "Well, if that's what you want to do."

Transitioning from church singing to rock and roll proved challenging. "I went from being a gospel singer right into rock and roll," she said, noting the difficulty of adjusting while touring the Deep South during the era of the Civil Rights Movement. Performing under segregation, she remembered that "we could only play to our own race," and described the period as one of hardship, adding that audiences "didn't have much money coming out of the cotton fields, so we were very, very poor."

The revue toured the Chitlin' Circuit and also performed at prominent theaters in major cities across the United States. In between gigs Ike Turner produced songs for vocalists in the revue. In 1963, Fields released her debut single, "You're Still My Baby"/ "I'm Leaving You," on Turner's Sony Records label. She was given solos to perform during shows, such as "The Love of My Man" on the album Ike & Tina Turner Revue Live (1964), "I Know (You Don't Love Me No More)," and "Good Time Tonight" on Live! The Ike & Tina Turner Show (1965).

In 1965, the Ikettes released the Top 40 hit "Peaches 'N' Cream" (Pop #36, R&B #28) and "I'm So Thankful" (Pop #74, R&B #12) on Modern Records. By late 1965, Fields left the revue along with fellow Ikettes Jessie Smith and Robbie Montgomery. Fields later recalled "I was an Ikette for five years. It was a rough job, but it was a very good experience. It's just like a school. You go from grade 1 to 2, not from 1 to 8. And when you graduate you have to leave. There is such a thing as staying too long; when you start getting stagnant and stifled by what you're doing. We almost stayed too long." Fields later relocated to Los Angeles after leaving the revue.

In 1966, the trio signed to Mirwood Records and became the Mirettes. They left Mirwood and released their highest-charting single "In the Midnight Hour" (Pop #45, R&B #18) on Revue Records in 1968. In 1969, the trio sang background for the soundtrack The Lost Man, produced by Quincy Jones. By 1970, Fields had left the group and was replaced by former Ikette Pat Powdrill.

=== Session vocalist ===
In 1969, Fields began working as a session vocalist alongside Clydie King and Sherlie Matthews. The trio, all established session singers, first came together to sing background for the Supremes, followed by Pacific Gas & Electric.

They formed the vocal trio the Blackberries at the suggestion of Steve Marriott of Humble Pie. As session singers, Fields and her collaborators contributed to major recordings, including the Rolling Stones' Exile on Main St. (1972), on which Fields and King performed on tracks such as "Tumbling Dice", "I Just Want to See His Face", "Let It Loose" and "Shine a Light." Fields later reflected on the sessions, noting they took place late at night, but she was "more interested in the coat than… the Rolling Stones." She also emphasized the group's musical approach, stating that "we knew gospel… that's what most people wanted from us, a gospel sound."

Marriott subsequently recruited them to record and tour with Humble Pie, producing an unreleased Blackberries album backed by the band before they parted ways in 1973. Their contributions were noted on recordings such as Eat It (1973), where their backing vocals were prominently featured. The trio also performed with Pink Floyd on the Dark Side of the Moon Tour in 1973, and contributed vocals to the album Wish You Were Here (1975).

They recorded extensively for several artists in the 1970s, including Aretha Franklin, Paul Butterfield, Tim Buckley, Steely Dan, Joe Walsh, Joe Cocker, Elkie Brooks, Neil Diamond, Leonard Cohen, Bob Seger, Burt Bacharach, Rita Coolidge, Ambrosia, Leon Russell, Boz Scaggs, Frankie Valli, and Burton Cummings.

In 1976, Fields and King appeared as backing vocalists (credited as the Oreos) for Barbra Streisand in the musical film A Star Is Born, and performed on its accompanying soundtrack. Reflecting on the experience, Fields said, "I learned so much from her," and described her career progression in academic terms: "I think I got my master's degree with Ike and Tina Turner and I'm getting my bachelor's degree now." Streisand, she recalled, replied, "No honey, you're getting your PhD."

Fields also remembered Streisand's hands-on approach during production. Initially resisting a wig—"It reminded me of my Ike and Tina Turner days"—she eventually accepted after Streisand said, "I really like the wig… you can wear your hair any other way for the rest of the movie." Fields added that Streisand "treated me like a little doll," but "kept her eye on me and kept me under her wing."

=== Career in Australia ===
As a member of Boz Scaggs' backing band, Fields toured Australia in 1978 and 1980. While in the country in the latter year she contributed backing vocals to Marc Hunter's (ex-Dragon) solo album, Big City Talk. Back in the US she provided backing vocals for So Lucky (1981), by Renée Geyer – the Australian artist was then working in California. Fields decided to relocate permanently to Australia in 1982 because she wanted to "get away to somewhere where I could start again."

She performed with Australian singer-songwriter Richard Clapton (1983–84). Neil Lade of The Canberra Times reviewed Clapton's album, Solidarity (1984), and described its final track, "New World", as "slow and softly lulling. A song of peace and hope... and Clapton's voice is at its tuneful best. And the backing vocals of Vanetta [sic] Fields add a powerful and echoing dimension to what may be just the album's finest song."

In the mid-1980s in Melbourne, Fields formed a new group, Venetta's Taxi, with a line-up including vocalist Sherlie Matthews, guitarist Michael den Elzen and Chong Lim on keyboards, while also performing regularly as a backing vocalist for local and touring artists. During this period Fields coached singing, including Karen Knowles and Colette Mann, at Tony Bartuccio's Dance Academy in Prahran. She took vocal workshops at the Victorian College of the Arts.

Fields was a vocalist with the Incredible Penguins in late 1985, for a cover of "Happy Xmas (War Is Over)", a charity project for research on little penguins, which peaked at No. 10 on the Australian Kent Music Report in December.

In 1986, she formed and toured her own show, Gospel Jubilee; the line-up of the band of the same name was Joanne Campbell, Joe Creighton, Chong Lim, Sherlie Mathews and Fellon Williams.

Fields started work for Farnham on his Jack's Back Tour in support of his album, Whispering Jack (1986). Debbie Kruger of Variety magazine caught the show at the State Theatre in March 1987, "Midway through the show, Farnham left the stage, and backing singer Venetta Fields sang three songs which kept the audience warm but eager for more of their hero."

Fields continued to work with US artists when they toured her adopted country until 2000, including George Benson, Dionne Warwick, Streisand, Thelma Houston and Randy Crawford. She also recorded or toured as a backing singer with Australian artists Jimmy Barnes, Australian Crawl, Cold Chisel, James Morrison and Mark Gillespie and as a long-term touring and session harmony vocalist for John Farnham (1986–95).

In January 1989, Fields made her musical theater debut as Alice in the Australian production of Big River: The Adventures of Huckleberry Finn at Her Majesty's Theatre, Sydney. She followed with other stage appearances, including two plays for the Melbourne Theatre Company – Racing Demon (1991) and The Crucible (1991) – Blues in the Night (1992), Chess (concert version), and as Ruby in the Buddy Holly show Buddy the Musical.

She released her solo album At Last in 1999.

=== Later years ===
Fields lives in Bendigo, Victoria. She no longer tours or records with visiting artists.

Fields is active as a vocal coach with several students, including 2005 Australian Idol winner Kate DeAraugo, singer-songwriter Cody Simpson and 2011 Australia's Got Talent finalist Bree De Rome.

== Accolades ==
In 2002, Fields received the Australian Gospel Singer of the Year award.

In 2005, Fields was inducted into the Buffalo Music Hall of Fame in recognition of her achievements.

== Selected discography ==
=== Solo singles ===
- 1963: "You're Still My Baby"/ "I'm Leaving You" (Sony 112)

=== Albums ===
- 1976: The Dupars Featuring Venetta Fields – Love Cookin' - We Rockin (Grit Records)
- 1999: At Last (Drumlake Pty. Ltd.)

==== Featured as an Ikette and Mirette ====
- 1964: Ike & Tina Turner Revue Live (Kent Records)
- 1965: Live! The Ike & Tina Turner Show (Warner Bros. Records)
- 1966: Soul the Hits (Modern Records)
- 1968: In The Midnight Hour (Revue Records)
- 1969: Whirlpool (Uni Records)
- 1992: Fine Fine Fine (Kent Records)
- 2007: Can't Sit Down... 'Cos It Feels So Good: The Complete Modern Recordings (Kent Records)
- 2012: Ike Turner Studio Productions New Orleans And Los Angeles 1963-1965 (Ace Records)

=== Backing vocal credits ===
- 1969: Quincy Jones – The Lost Man (soundtrack)
- 1970: Neil Diamond – Gold: Recorded Live at the Troubadour
- 1970: Fever Tree – For Sale
- 1970: Paul Butterfield – Live
- 1970: Stevie Wonder - Signed, Sealed, Delivered
- 1971: Barbra Streisand – Stoney End
- 1971: Barbra Streisand – Barbra Joan Streisand
- 1971: Graham Nash – Songs for Beginners
- 1971: Paul Butterfield – Sometimes I Just Feel Like Smilin'
- 1971: Spirit – Feedback
- 1972: The Rolling Stones – Exile on Main St.
- 1972: The Doors – Full Circle
- 1972: Tim Buckley – Greetings from L.A.
- 1972: Steely Dan – Can't Buy a Thrill
- 1972: Freddy Robinson - At the Drive-In
- 1973: Humble Pie – Eat It
- 1973: Diana Ross – "Touch Me in the Morning"
- 1973: Joe Walsh – The Smoker You Drink, the Player You Get
- 1973: Pink Floyd – Dark Side of the Moon Tour
- 1973: Sonny Terry & Brownie McGhee – Sonny & Brownie
- 1974: Humble Pie – Thunderbox
- 1974: Joe Cocker – I Can Stand a Little Rain
- 1974: Gene Clark – No Other
- 1974: Tim Buckley – Look at the Fool
- 1975: Humble Pie – Street Rats
- 1975: Joe Cocker – Jamaica Say You Will
- 1975: Pink Floyd – Wish You Were Here
- 1975: The Doobie Brothers – Stampede
- 1975: Elkie Brooks – Rich Man's Woman
- 1975: Bonnie Raitt – Home Plate
- 1976: Steve Marriott – Marriott
- 1976: Neil Diamond – Beautiful Noise
- 1976: Steely Dan - The Royal Scam
- 1977: Alice Cooper – Lace and Whiskey
- 1977: Leonard Cohen – Death of a Ladies' Man
- 1977: Steely Dan – Aja
- 1978: Dr. John – Hollywood Be Thy Name
- 1978: Bob Seger – Stranger in Town
- 1978: Burton Cummings – Dream of a Child
- 1978: Chuck Girard – Take It Easy
- 1978: Neil Diamond – You Don't Bring Me Flowers
- 1978: Jean Terrell – I Had to Fall in Love
- 1979: Elkie Brooks – Live and Learn
- 1979: Burt Bacharach – Together?
- 1979: Neil Diamond – September Morn
- 1980: Boz Scaggs – Middle Man
- 1980: Syreeta - Syreeta
- 1982: Tim Finn – Escapade
- 1984: Richard Clapton – Solidarity
- 1984: Jimmy Barnes – Bodyswerve
- 1988: John Farnham – Age of Reason
- 1989: Richard Clapton – The Best Years of Our Lives
- 1990: John Farnham – Chain Reaction

Credits at AllMusic
