= Bennie Smith =

American blues guitarist

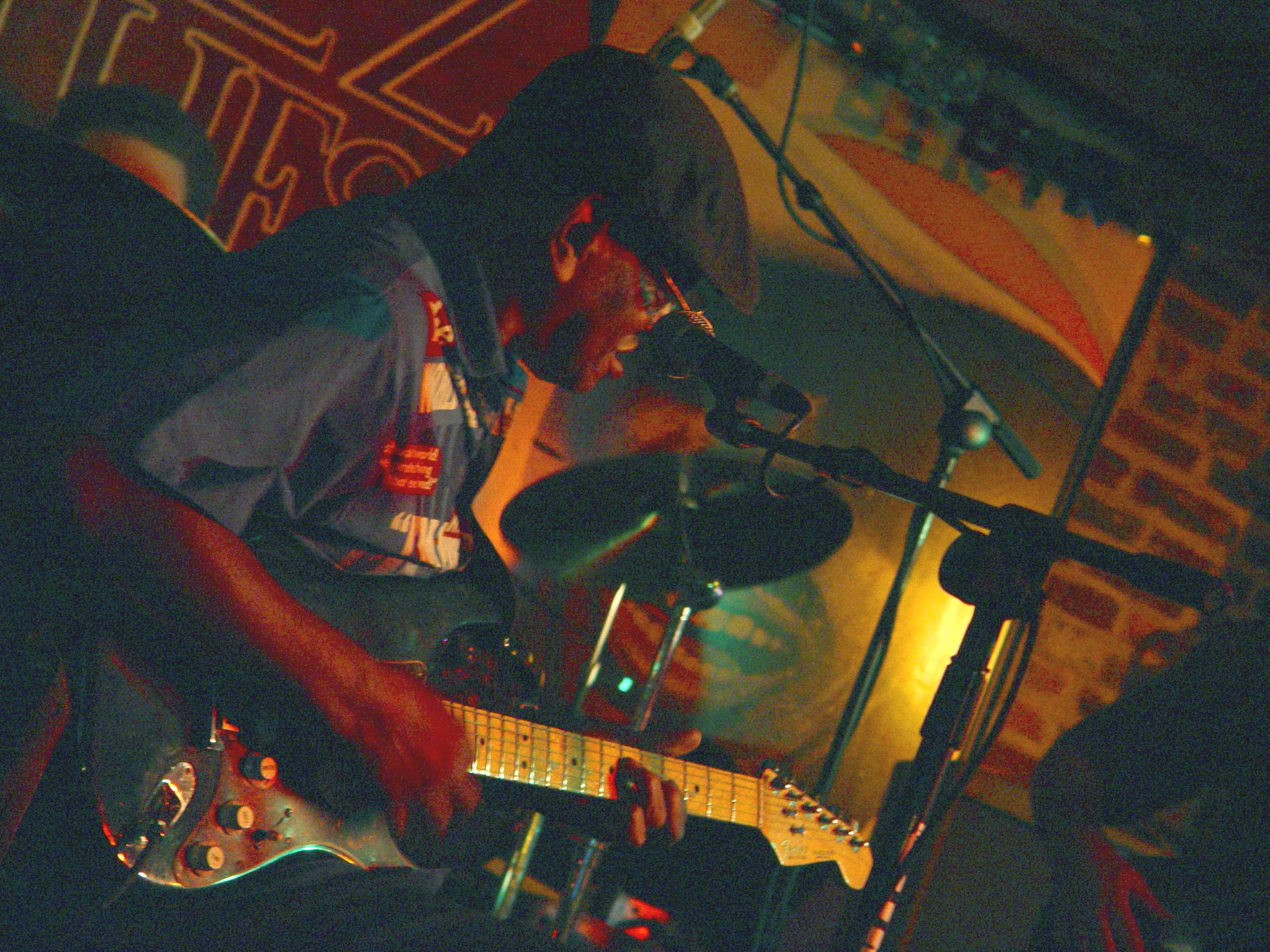
Bennie Smith; October 2004

Bennie Smith (October 5, 1933 in St. Louis, Missouri – September 10, 2006 in St. Louis, Missouri) was an American, St. Louis blues guitarist, considered to be one of the city's patriarchs of electric blues.

His sound was emblematic of a St. Louis blues music that he helped define in over half a century practicing his trade. His contributions to the genre in that city, from the early 1950s and almost until the day of his death, included mentor, performer, and recording artist.

Due to his significant contribution to blues music in St. Louis, in October 2003 he received a proclamation from mayor Francis Slay marking October 5, 2003 as 'Bennie Smith Day' in that city. The board of aldermen similarly honored Smith, recognizing him as the "Dean of St. Louis Electric Guitarists". During the 2006 Big Muddy Blues Festival in St. Louis, Mayor Slay honored Bennie once again on September 2 of that year, declaring that day also be known as 'Bennie Smith Day' in St. Louis.

== Career ==
Smith worked as a session musician on many recordings over the years, and has three original albums to his name: The Urban Soul of Bennie Smith (Blues Highway – 1993), Shook Up (Fedora Records – 2001), and The Bennie Smith All Star Session (2006). In a notable 1958 session, Smith was invited to contribute on what would be Tina Turner's first recording, "Boxtop". The song featured Ike Turner with 'Little Ann' on backing vocals, and Smith on guitar. In addition, he has played with such guitar players as Hubert Sumlin, Clarence "Gatemouth" Brown, B.B. King and Grant Green.

== Style ==
Smith named Clarence "Gatemouth" Brown and Matt "Guitar" Murphy as his two greatest influences on the guitar.

== Death ==
As a complication to lung cancer, Smith suffered from a heart attack and died on September 10, 2006. In 2014 the Killer Blues Headstone Project placed a headstone for Bennie Smith at Laurel Hill Cemetery in St. Louis.

== Discography ==
=== Albums ===
- The Urban Soul of Bennie Smith – 1993 (Blues Highway Music)
- Shook Up – 2001 (Fedora Records)
- Bennie Smith All-Star Sessions – 2006

In addition to his featured albums, Smith provided lead and rhythm guitar on a number of released singles and albums. These included:

=== Sessions – singles ===
- "Boxtop", Ike Turner, (with Tina Turner (a.k.a. Little Ann) on vocals) 1958 (Tune Town)
- "Mistreated", Clayton Love with the Roosevelt Marks Orchestra, 1958–59 (Bobbin). It is likely that Smith recorded other songs with the Roosevelt Marks Orchestra during the period from 1958 to 1961.
- "Condition Your Heart", Little Herbert and the Arabians, 1961
- "Shook Up Over You", Jimmy "Soul" Clark, 1963

=== Sessions – albums ===
- Mean Disposition, Big Bad Smitty, 1991 (Adelphi/Genes. This album is included in the Library of Congress)
- Cold Blood, Big Bad Smitty, 1997 (HMG) Smith shared the lead guitar role with Hubert Sumlin.
