= Kim Massie =

American blues and soul singer (1958–2020)

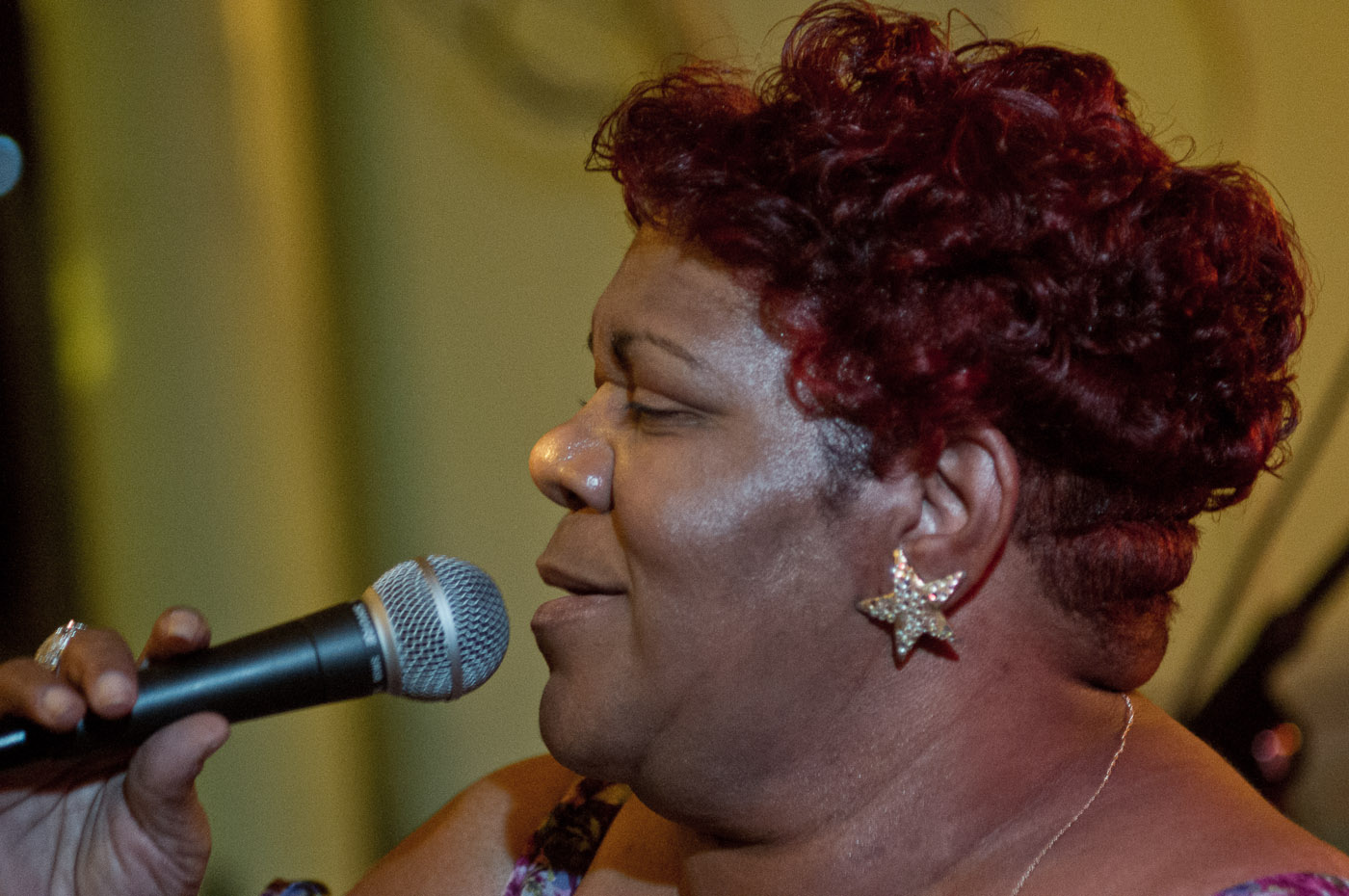
- Kim Massie

Background information
- Born: April 19, 1958
- Died: October 12, 2020 (aged 62)
- Genres: Soul, jazz, blues, R&B, gospel, funk
- Occupation: singer
- Instrument: vocals
- Years active: 1999–2020

Kim Massie (April 19, 1958 – October 12, 2020) was an American blues and soul singer who performed mostly in her native St. Louis, Missouri.

Though her earliest musical experiences were schooled in the gospel choirs of East St. Louis, Illinois, she has had no formal training as a vocalist. She spent her formative years in Lorain, Ohio, returning to St. Louis in 1999 to pursue her dreams of performing as a vocalist. She was discovered when she sat in with the St. Louis saxophonist Oliver Sain (1932–2003), and soon afterwards formed her own band, the Solid Senders.

She made frequent appearances at blues dance events and festivals coast to coast, including Blues Rising (San Francisco, 2007), the Emerald City Blues Festival (Seattle, 2009 and 2010).

Massie won two "Best Female vocalist of the Year" awards from the Riverfront Times and starred in the 2003 production of It Ain't Nothin' But the Blues by the St. Louis Black Repertory Theatre. In 2005, she won a Grand Center Visionary Award.

Massie died on October 12, 2020, at the age of 62.
