= Ike & Tina Turner Revue Live =

Live album by Ike & Tina Turner
- Released: November 1964
- Recorded: 1964
- Venue: Club Imperial (St. Louis, MO), Harlem Club (St. Louis, MO)
- Genre: R&B; soul
- Label: Kent
- Producer: Ike Turner

Ike & Tina Turner chronology
It's Gonna Work Out Fine (1963)	Ike & Tina Turner Revue Live (1964)	Live! The Ike & Tina Turner Show (1965)

Singles from Ike & Tina Turner Revue Live
- 1. "Please, Please, Please" Released: November 1964; 2. "All in My Mind" Released: 1973

Ike & Tina Turner Revue Live is the first live album by Ike & Tina Turner, released on Kent Records in 1964.

== Background ==
The Ike & Tina Turner Revue was formed in 1960 in St. Louis by songwriter, musician, and bandleader Ike Turner. By 1963, Ike Turner and his wife Tina Turner, lead singer of his band, had a string of R&B hit singles but no charting albums on Sue Records. They recorded on Turners own Sonja label and then signed with Warner Bros. Records in 1964. They also released a few singles and an album on Kent Records. The Revue had already built a reputation as "one of the most potent live acts on the R&B circuit," so for their first, and the only Kent album they recorded a live album.

== Recording and release ==
Ike & Tina Turner Revue Live was recorded at Club Imperial and the Harlem Club in St. Louis. The album features lead vocals from Tina and other vocalists within the Ike & Tina Turner Revue including Ikettes Venetta Fields and Robbie Montgomery. Released in November 1964, the album became their first charting album. It peaked at No. 90 on Cash Box's albums chart.

A studio version of "I Can't Believe What You Say" was released as a single in September 1964 and reached No. 95 on the Billboard Hot 100. Their cover of James Brown's "Please, Please, Please" was released as a single in November 1964. The B-side was a previously unreleased song, "Am I a Fool in Love." Ike & Tina Turner performed "Please, Please, Please" on The Big T.N.T. Show in 1965.

In 1973, Seabird Records released Ike & Tina Turner's cover of Maxine Brown's "All In My Mind" as a single in France.

== Critical reception ==
Professional ratings
Review scores
Source	Rating
AllMusic	3.5/5 stars

Record World (October 24, 1964): "Nothing stops Tina Turner when she starts in. And does she start in on this disk! Her 'Please, Please, Please' is a highly charged blueser-cum-speech which goes on and on and has the crowd screaming like Beatle fans. The other acts match her fervor."

Cash Box (October 24, 1964):

'Soul' singing runs rampant and rhythm and blues were never more potent than on this 'live' cut performance by Ike & Tina Turner and their revue which spotlights Stacy Johnson, Vernon Guy, Venetta Fields, Jimmy Thomas, Bobby John, Robbie Robinson [ sic ], and the Kings of Rhythm. 'Please Please Please', 'The Love of My Man', and 'Drown in My Own Tears' could make this one an instant best-seller on the r&b market.

== Reissues ==
Ike & Tina Turner Revue Live was reissued by Kent as Please, Please Please in 1970. The album was released by Kent on CD with nine additional tracks in 1996.

== Track listing ==
Side A
No.	Title	Writer(s)	Length
1.	"Please, Please, Please" (Tina Turner)	James Brown, Johnny Terry	6:54
2.	"Feel So Good" (Jimmy Thomas)	Junior Parker	3:12
3.	"The Love of My Man" (Venetta Fields)	Ed Townsend	3:55
4.	"Think" (Bobby John)	Lowman Pauling	2:24

Side B
No.	Title	Writer(s)	Length
1.	"Drown in My Own Tears" (Stacy Johnson)	Henry Glover	7:31
2.	"I Love the Way You Love" (Robbie Montgomery)	Al Abrams, John Odenwald, Stanley Ossman, Berry Gordy	3:12
3.	"Your Precious Love" (Vernon Guy)	Richard Brooks, Arthur Brooks, Jerry Butler	2:30
4.	"All in My Mind" (Tina Turner)	Maxine Brown, Kirkland, Johnson	3:30
5.	"I Can't Believe What You Say" (Tina Turner)	Ike Turner	1:59

== Chart performance ==
Chart (1965)	Peak position
US Cash Box Top 100	90
US Record World LP's Coming Up	129
