= Tell Him I'm Not Home =

Single by Chuck Jackson

from the album Encore!
- B-side: "Lonely Am I"
- Released: January 1963
- Genre: R&B
- Length: 2:45
- Label: Wand Records
- Songwriters: Tony Bruno, Brenda Bruno, Sanford Bellini
- Producer: Tony Bruno

Chuck Jackson singles chronology
"I'm Yours" (1962)	"Tell Him I'm Not Home" (1963)	"I Will Never Turn My Back On You" (1963)

"Tell Him I'm Not Home" is a song written by Tony Bruno, Brenda Bruno, and Sanford Bellini. The song is about a lover lamenting about a relationship that has lost its flame. It was first recorded by R&B singer Chuck Jackson, and released as a single from his album Encore! on Wand Records in 1963. The single reached No. 42 on the Billboard Hot 100 and No. 12 on the Hot R&B Singles chart.

== Critical reception ==
Cash Box (January 12, 1963):

Jackson who's currently cashing in "Gettin' ready For The Heartbreak" sends up another striking contender for dual-market chartdom. It's a pulsating, cha cha like romantic heartbreaker, tagged "Tell Him I'm Not Home," that Chuck wrings every once of emotion out of. Standout ork-choral backdrop (with exciting back-and-forth vocal play) conducted by Tony Bruno. The soulful undercut finds a tantalizing rock-a-waltz-like setting.

== Ike & Tina Turner version ==
"Tell Her I'm Not Home"

Single by Ike & Tina Turner
- B-side: "I'm Thru With Love"
- Released: February 1965 (US); July 1966 (UK)
- Genre: R&B; soul; northern soul
- Length: 3:20
- Label: Loma (US); Warner bros. (UK)
- Songwriter: Tony Bruno
- Producer: Bob Krasnow

Ike & Tina Turner singles chronology
"He's The One" (1964)	"Tell Her I'm Not Home" (1965)	"Somebody Needs You" (1965)

Ike & Tina Turner covered recorded a version of the song title "Tell Her I'm Not Home." Their version of the song musically quotes a passage of Pyotr Ilyich Tchaikovsky's 1812 Overture as "musical interjections between lines of text". It was produced by Bob Krasnow, head of Loma Records, and released as a non-album track on Loma in 1965. Tina Turner promoted the song on Shindig! in April 1965. The single peaked at No. 33 on the Billboard R&B chart and No. 108 on Bubbling Under The Hot 100.

After the success with "River Deep – Mountain High" in England, the song was released as a single by Loma's parent label, Warner Bros. Records, in the United Kingdom in 1966. It reached No. 48 on the UK Singles chart. In 1975, the song was reissued as a single on Warner Bros. in Germany. It later appeared on the compilation albums Finger Poppin'…The Warner Brothers Years (Edsel Records, 1988) and The Ike & Tina Turner Story: 1960–1975 (Time Life, 2007).

=== Critical reception ===
The single received positive reviews, including a 4-star rating from Billboard.

Professional ratings
Review scores
Source	Rating
Billboard	4/4 stars

Cash Box (February 13, 1965): "Soulful blues sound follows a telephone talk opening. Could break big in the R&B areas, and spread to a wide range of record buyers. Bob Krasnow produced the tune, and might well see fine results."

== Normie Rowe version ==
"Tell Him I'm Not Home"

Single by Normie Rowe
- A-side: "Call On Me"
- Released: November 1965
- Genre: Pop
- Length: 2:14
- Label: Sunshine Records
- Songwriters: Bruno, Bellini
- Producer: Paul Aulton

Normie Rowe singles chronology
"Que Sera, Sera (Whatever Will Be, Will Be)" (1965)	"Tell Him I'm Not Home" (1965)	"The Breaking Point" (1966)

Australian singer Normie Rowe's cover of "Tell Him I'm Not Home" was released as a B-side single in November 1965. It peaked at No. 3 on the Australian Singles chart and was a top 5 hit in most Australian mainland capitals, reaching No. 4 in Sydney, No. 2 in Melbourne, No. 2 in Adelaide and No. 1 in Melbourne. The song was ranked the 13th biggest hit of 1965 on the Kent Music Report list of the Top 25 singles for 1965 in Australia.

== Chart performance ==
Chuck Jackson
Chart (1963)	Peak position
US Billboard Hot 100	42
US Billboard Hot R&B Singles	12

Ike & Tina Turner
Chart (1965–1966)	Peak position
United Kingdom	48
US Billboard Hot R&B Singles	33
US Billboard Bubbling Under Hot 100	108
US Cash Box Looking Ahead	135
US Record World Singles Coming Up	117

Normie Rowe
Chart (1966)	Peak position
Australia	3
