= Somebody Needs You =

Song by Frank Wilson

Single by Ike & Tina Turner
- B-side: "(I'll Do Anything) Just To Be With You"
- Released: May 1965 (US); December 1966 (UK)
- Genre: Soul; R&B; Northern soul
- Length: 2:25
- Label: Loma (US); Warner Bros. (UK)
- Songwriter: Frank Wilson
- Producer: IKECO Productions

Ike & Tina Turner singles chronology
"Tell Her I'm Not Home" (1965)	"Somebody Needs You" (1965)	"Good Bye, So Long" (1965)

"Somebody Needs You" is a song written by Motown songwriter Frank Wilson. It was originally released as a non-album track by R&B duo Ike & Tina Turner on Loma Records in May 1965. In 1966, soul singer Darrell Banks reached the Billboard charts with his rendition.

== Release and critical reception ==
"Somebody Needs You" was released on Loma Records in May 1965. Characterized by a "driving rock" melody, Cash Box described the single as a "Detroit styled throbber."

The single "Somebody (Somewhere) Needs You" was released in the UK in December 1966.

A live version was included on the album The Ike & Tina Turner Show Vol. 2 (Loma Records, 1967). The song later appeared on the compilation Finger Poppin'…The Warner Brothers Years (Edsel Records, 1988). It became very popular on the UK Northern Soul scene in the mid-1970s (up to the present day) and original vinyl copies on the Loma label are sought after by Northern Soul record collectors.

== Darrell Banks version ==
"Somebody (Somewhere) Needs You"

Single by Darrell Banks
- B-side: "Baby What'cha You Got ( For Me)"
- Released: September 1966
- Genre: Soul; R&B
- Length: 2:35
- Label: Revilot Records
- Songwriters: Frank Wilson, Marc Gordon
- Producer: Solid Hitbound Productions

Darrell Banks singles chronology
"Open The Door To Your Heart" (1966)	"Somebody (Somewhere) Needs You" (1966)	"Here Come The Tears" (1967)

Darrell Banks released a version titled "Somebody (Somewhere) Needs You" on Revilot Records in September 1966. His record reached No. 55 on the Billboard Hot 100 and No. 34 on the R&B chart. Reviewing the single, Billboard (October 1, 1966) wrote: "Moving is the word for the new Darrell Banks disk and there's no holding it back. Should be his second smash!"

The song appeared on his debut album Darrell Banks Is Here!, released by Atco Records in 1967.

=== Chart performance ===
Darrell Bank
Chart (1966)	Peak position
US Billboard Hot 100	55
US Billboard R&B Singles	34
