= Welcome to Sweetie Pie's =

American TV reality series

- Genre: Reality
- Starring: Robbie Montgomery
- Country of origin: United States
- Original language: English
- No. of seasons: 9
- No. of episodes: 100

Production
- Executive producers: Craig Piligian; JJ Duncan; Melodie Calvert; Jeff Keane; Tim Breitbach; Steve Luebbert
- Running time: 40-43 minutes
- Production company: Pilgrim Films & Television

Original release
- Network: Oprah Winfrey Network
- Release: October 15, 2011 – June 9, 2018

Welcome to Sweetie Pie's is an American reality television series starring the family of former Ikette Robbie Montgomery, and also focuses on the running of their collection of soul food restaurants, Sweetie Pie's. The series premiered on October 15, 2011, and ended on June 9, 2018, on the Oprah Winfrey Network.

== Background ==
Robbie Montgomery began her career in the 1960s as an Ikette. The Ikettes was the backing group for soul duo sensation Ike & Tina Turner. After her lung collapsed and she could no longer sing, Robbie took her mother's soul food recipes, and created "Sweetie Pie's" St. Louis' soul food restaurant run by Miss Robbie and her family. With two locations, Miss Robbie is preparing to open a third restaurant with the help of her son and business partner, Tim. While Tim and his fiancée, Jenae, tend to their newborn son and plan their wedding – Miss Robbie, who has never been married, continues to look for love at the age of 71 all the while keeping the family in line – especially her nephew Lil' Charles. Welcome to Sweetie Pie's follows the Montgomery family as they struggle with the demands of expanding their family-owned business and creating a legacy to pass on to future generations.

== Production ==
Welcome to Sweetie Pie's premiered on Oprah Winfrey Network on October 15, 2011. The series went on hiatus after the winter finale on December 3, 2011, and resumed with new episodes from March 31, 2012, until June 2, 2012. The first season consists of a total of 18 episodes. Beginning July 14, 2012, and continuing until the second season premiered, Oprah Winfrey Network aired two episodes of Welcome to Sweetie Pie's: An Extra Slice every Saturday, featuring never-before-seen moments from season 1. On April 5, 2012, OWN announced that Welcome to Sweetie Pie's was renewed for a second season. Season 2 aired weekly on OWN September 15, 2012, until December 15, 2012. Season 3 of Welcome to Sweetie Pie's premiered on July 27, 2013, premiering with the highest-rated episode of the series' history. On April 14, 2018, OWN announced that the series will end after the ninth season. The ninth and final season premiered on May 1, 2018.

On March 14, 2016, frequent cast member Andre Montgomery Jr. was murdered in a St. Louis shooting. Andre Jr. was Robbie Montgomery's grandson and was the subject of numerous episodes which focused on his move from Texas to the St. Louis area, struggles in school, as well as a visit to the grave of his father Andre Montgomery Sr. On August 18, 2020, Montgomery's son Tim Norman, who was also a frequent cast member, was arrested in Mississippi and charged for his alleged role in a murder for hire plot that resulted in the death of Montgomery's grandson in 2016. It was reported that Tim, who had been facing federal charges and was proven to have become the sole beneficiary to Andre Jr.'s estate in 2014, recruited an exotic dancer from Memphis named Terica Ellis and others to assist in the murder plot. In 2022, Ellis and two other co-conspirators would plead guilty to conspiracy to commit murder. Norman's murder trial began on September 6, 2022, and on September 16 a jury convicted Norman on two counts of murder-for-hire and one charge of conspiracy to commit wire fraud. On March 2, 2023, Norman received a life sentence.

== Episodes ==
| Season | Episodes | Originally released | |
| Season | Episodes | First released | Last released |
|---|---|---|---|
| 1 | 18 | October 15, 2011 | June 12, 2012 |
| 2 | 12 | September 15, 2012 | December 15, 2012 |
| 3 | 13 | July 27, 2013 | October 26, 2013 |
| 4 | 14 | March 15, 2014 | August 16, 2014 |
| 5 | 8 | February 28, 2015 | April 18, 2015 |
| 6 | 8 | November 21, 2015 | January 9, 2016 |
| 7 | 13 | November 19, 2016 | February 25, 2017 |
| 8 | 8 | November 25, 2017 | January 13, 2018 |
| 9 | 6 | May 1, 2018 | June 9, 2018 |

=== Season 1 (2011–12) ===
| No. overall | No. in season | Title | Original release date |
|---|---|---|---|
| 1 | 1 | "The Business of Family" | October 15, 2011 |
| 2 | 2 | "Happy Birthday, Miss Robbie" | October 22, 2011 |
| 3 | 3 | "Special Delivery" | October 29, 2011 |
| 4 | 4 | "Family Matters" | November 5, 2011 |
| 5 | 5 | "All You Need Is Love" | November 12, 2011 |
| 6 | 6 | "Go Big or Go Home" | November 19, 2011 |
| 7 | 7 | "Second Chances" | November 26, 2011 |
| 8 | 8 | "Hopes & Dreams" | December 3, 2011 |
| 9 | 9 | "Miss Robbie's Full House" | March 31, 2012 |
| 10 | 10 | "Growing Pains" | April 7, 2012 |
| 11 | 11 | "You Can Count on Me" | April 14, 2012 |
| 12 | 12 | "The Heat Is On" | April 21, 2012 |
| 13 | 13 | "Boiling Point" | April 28, 2012 |
| 14 | 14 | "Opportunity Knocks" | May 5, 2012 |
| 15 | 15 | "We Are Family" | May 12, 2012 |
| 16 | 16 | "Tim's Lifeclass" | May 19, 2012 |
| 17 | 17 | "Decisions, Decisions" | May 19, 2012 |
| 18 | 18 | "It Takes a Village" | June 2, 2012 |

=== Season 2 (2012) ===
| No. overall | No. in season | Title | Original release date | U.S. viewers (millions) |
|---|---|---|---|---|
| 19 | 1 | "Welcome to the Upper Crust" | September 15, 2012 | 0.93 |
| 20 | 2 | "The Upper Crust vs. the Lower Crust" | September 22, 2012 | 0.79 |
| 21 | 3 | "For Love or Money" | September 29, 2012 | 0.67 |
| 22 | 4 | "Don't Be a Party Pooper" | October 6, 2012 | 0.60 |
| 23 | 5 | "Showing Up Is Hard to Do" | October 13, 2012 | 0.64 |
| 24 | 6 | "Charles in Charge" | October 20, 2012 | 0.74 |
| 25 | 7 | "Just Say 'Yes Ma'am'" | November 3, 2012 | 0.70 |
| 26 | 8 | "The Future of the Mangrove — Part 1" | November 10, 2012 | 0.84 |
| 27 | 9 | "The Future of the Mangrove — Part 2" | November 17, 2012 | 0.93 |
| 28 | 10 | "Lean on Me" | December 1, 2012 | 0.80 |
| 29 | 11 | "Voices Carry, Charles Doesn't" | December 8, 2012 | 0.87 |
| 30 | 12 | "Highballs & Low-Balls" | December 15, 2012 | 0.82 |

=== Season 3 (2013) ===
| No. overall | No. in season | Title | Original release date | U.S. viewers (millions) |
|---|---|---|---|---|
| 31 | 1 | "End of an Era" | July 27, 2013 | 1.07 |
| 32 | 2 | "Baby-Proofed" | August 3, 2013 | 0.85 |
| 33 | 3 | "Vote for Me, I'll Set You Free" | August 10, 2013 | 0.75 |
| 34 | 4 | "You Gonna Learn Today!" | August 17, 2013 | 0.85 |
| 35 | 5 | "Sweetie Pie's On-the-Go" | August 24, 2013 | 0.75 |
| 36 | 6 | "Give & Take" | September 7, 2013 | 0.93 |
| 37 | 7 | "Scheming and Dreaming" | September 14, 2013 | 0.63 |
| 38 | 8 | "When Robbie's Away..." | September 21, 2013 | N/A |
| 39 | 9 | "Surprise?" | September 28, 2013 | 0.89 |
| 40 | 10 | "Do the Sweetie Pie!" | October 5, 2013 | 0.81 |
| 41 | 11 | "First Time for Everything" | October 12, 2013 | N/A |
| 42 | 12 | "Managing Expectations" | October 19, 2013 | 0.81 |
| 43 | 13 | "Fools Rush In" | October 26, 2013 | 0.81 |

=== Season 4 (2014) ===
| No. overall | No. in season | Title | Original release date | U.S. viewers (millions) |
|---|---|---|---|---|
| 44 | 1 | "Houston's Calling" | March 15, 2014 | N/A |
| 45 | 2 | "Shifting Priorities" | March 22, 2014 | N/A |
| 46 | 3 | "Negotiating a Dream" | March 29, 2014 | 0.91 |
| 47 | 4 | "What Happens in Houston..." | April 5, 2014 | 0.72 |
| 48 | 5 | "Houston, We Have a Problem" | April 12, 2014 | N/A |
| 49 | 6 | "Can't We All Just Get Along?" | April 19, 2014 | N/A |
| 50 | 7 | "Somethin's a Brewin'" | April 26, 2014 | N/A |
| 51 | 8 | "The Perfect Storm" | May 3, 2014 | 0.81 |
| 52 | 9 | "Hello, Memphis!" | July 12, 2014 | N/A |
| 53 | 10 | "The Devil's in the Details" | July 19, 2014 | N/A |
| 54 | 11 | "Disconnection Notice" | July 26, 2014 | N/A |
| 55 | 12 | "Good Cop, Bad Cop" | August 2, 2014 | N/A |
| 56 | 13 | "Running Out of Time" | August 9, 2014 | N/A |
| 57 | 14 | "Ready to Launch" | August 16, 2014 | N/A |

=== Season 5 (2015) ===
| No. overall | No. in season | Title | Original release date | U.S. viewers (millions) |
|---|---|---|---|---|
| 58 | 1 | "Jesus, Take the Wheel" | February 28, 2015 | 0.82 |
| 59 | 2 | "With Unity Comes Change" | March 7, 2015 | 0.72 |
| 60 | 3 | "The Pecking Order" | March 14, 2015 | 0.73 |
| 61 | 4 | "Ferguson" | March 21, 2015 | 0.95 |
| 62 | 5 | "California Dreamin'" | March 28, 2015 | 0.86 |
| 63 | 6 | "Too Blessed to Be Stressed" | April 4, 2015 | 0.72 |
| 64 | 7 | "Soft Opening, Hard Landing" | April 11, 2015 | 0.65 |
| 65 | 8 | "The Final Countdown" | April 18, 2015 | 0.78 |

=== Season 6 (2015–16) ===
| No. overall | No. in season | Title | Original release date | U.S. viewers (millions) |
|---|---|---|---|---|
| 66 | 1 | "Hooray for (North) Hollywood!" | November 21, 2015 | 0.75 |
| 67 | 2 | "NoHo or NoGo?" | November 28, 2015 | 0.57 |
| 68 | 3 | "A Tale of Two Cities" | December 5, 2015 | 0.74 |
| 69 | 4 | "Life’s a Beach (Kind Of)" | December 12, 2015 | 0.77 |
| 70 | 5 | "That’s What Friends Are For" | December 19, 2015 | 0.64 |
| 71 | 6 | "Secrets & Sabotage" | December 26, 2015 | 0.59 |
| 72 | 7 | "If You Can’t Stand the Heat..." | January 2, 2016 | 0.70 |
| 73 | 8 | "To Inglewood and Beyond" | January 9, 2016 | 0.75 |

=== Season 7 (2016–17) ===
| No. overall | No. in season | Title | Original release date | U.S. viewers (millions) |
|---|---|---|---|---|
| 74 | 1 | "In Loving Memory" | November 19, 2016 | 0.89 |
| 75 | 2 | "The Ripple Effect" | November 26, 2016 | 0.75 |
| 76 | 3 | "Behind the Wall" | December 3, 2016 | 0.69 |
| 77 | 4 | "Vacation: Sweetie Pie’s- Style" | December 10, 2016 | 0.66 |
| 78 | 5 | "Show Up or Show Out" | December 17, 2016 | 0.62 |
| 79 | 6 | "Something’s Gotta Give" | January 7, 2017 | 0.72 |
| 80 | 7 | "Family Business Is Always Personal" | January 14, 2017 | 0.62 |
| 81 | 8 | "Irreconcilable Differences" | January 21, 2017 | 0.79 |
| 82 | 9 | "Finish What You Started" | January 28, 2017 | 0.66 |
| 83 | 10 | "No Opening, No Closure" | February 4, 2017 | 0.73 |
| 84 | 11 | "Going for Broke" | February 11, 2017 | 0.63 |
| 85 | 12 | "Challenge Accepted!" | February 18, 2017 | 0.65 |
| 86 | 13 | "Facing the Music" | February 25, 2017 | 0.72 |

=== Season 8 (2017–18) ===
| No. overall | No. in season | Title | Original release date | U.S. viewers (millions) |
|---|---|---|---|---|
| 87 | 1 | "Deep in the Heart of Texas" | November 25, 2017 | 0.54 |
| 88 | 2 | "With a Little Help from My Friends" | December 2, 2017 | 0.53 |
| 89 | 3 | "Better Get Steppin'" | December 9, 2017 | 0.64 |
| 90 | 4 | "Got My Mojo Workin'" | December 16, 2017 | 0.57 |
| 91 | 5 | "Cussin’, Cryin’ and Carryin’ On" | December 23, 2017 | 0.44 |
| 92 | 6 | "Road Blocks" | December 30, 2017 | 0.61 |
| 93 | 7 | "Keep on Pushin'" | January 6, 2018 | 0.59 |
| 94 | 8 | "I Can't Stand the Rain" | January 13, 2018 | 0.64 |

=== Season 9 (2018) ===
| No. overall | No. in season | Title | Original release date | U.S. viewers (millions) |
|---|---|---|---|---|
| 95 | 1 | "You Got Me Runnin’" | May 1, 2018 | 0.72 |
| 96 | 2 | "Keep You Guessing" | May 12, 2018 | 0.47 |
| 97 | 3 | "Ain’t Nobody’s Business" | May 19, 2018 | 0.43 |
| 98 | 4 | "Lean on Me" | May 26, 2018 | 0.42 |
| 99 | 5 | "Come Together" | June 2, 2018 | 0.59 |
| 100 | 6 | "Movin' On" | June 9, 2018 | 0.58 |

=== Specials ===
| No. | Title | Original release date | U.S. viewers (millions) |
|---|---|---|---|
| SP1 | "Holiday Special — The Cast Speaks Out!" | November 24, 2012 | N/A |
| SP2 | "Behind the Scenes Special" | December 15, 2012 | 0.61 |
| SP3 | "Holiday Special: Clips, Carols, & Confessions" | November 30, 2013 | N/A |
| SP4 | "Cast Reunion: Spilling the Sweet Tea" | June 9, 2018 | 0.57 |

== Awards and nominations ==
| Year | Award | Category | Result |
|---|---|---|---|
| 2012 | 18th Annual NAMIC Vision Awards | Reality Show | Nominated |
| 2013 | NAACP Image Award | Outstanding Reality Series | Won |
| 2014 | NAACP Image Award | Outstanding Reality Series | Nominated |
| 2014 | 20th Annual NAMIC Vision Awards | Reality Show | Nominated |
| 2015 | NAACP Image Awards | Outstanding Reality Series | Nominated |
| 2016 | NAACP Image Awards | Outstanding Reality Series/ Reality Competition Series | Won |
| 2016 | 22nd Annual NAMIC Vision Awards | Reality Show | Nominated |
