= Triumvirate (Mike Bloomfield, John P. Hammond, and Dr. John album) =

Studio album by Mike Bloomfield, John Hammond, Jr. and Dr. John
- Released: August 1973
- Studios: Columbia (San Francisco, California); Village Recorder (Los Angeles, California)
- Genres: Blues, rock, R&B
- Length: 36:22
- Label: Columbia
- Producer: Thomas Jefferson Kaye

Professional ratings
Review scores
Source	Rating
AllMusic	3.5/5 stars
The Rolling Stone Record Guide	3/5 stars

Triumvirate is a 1973 collaboration by Mike Bloomfield, John Hammond, Jr. and Dr. John. It is the only album they released together.

== Track listing ==
Side one
No.	Title	Writer(s)	Length
1.	"Cha-Dooky-Doo"	Mae Vince	3:29
2.	"Last Night"	Walter Jacobs	2:55
3.	"I Yi Yi"	Dr. John	3:41
4.	"Just to Be With You"	Bernie Roth	4:05
5.	"Baby Let Me Kiss You"	King Floyd	2:58

Side two
No.	Title	Writer(s)	Length
1.	"Sho 'Bout to Drive Me Wild"	King Floyd, Jessie Hill, Mac Rebennack, Alvin Robinson	3:31
2.	"It Hurts Me Too"	Mel London, Hudson Whittaker	3:47
3.	"Rock Me Baby"	Joe Josea, B. B. King	3:40
4.	"Ground Hog Blues"	John Lee Hooker	3:31
5.	"Pretty Thing"	Willie Dixon	4:36

== Personnel ==
- Mike Bloomfield – lead guitar, keyboards, vocals
- John Hammond, Jr. – guitar, harmonica, lead vocals
- Dr. John – banjo, guitar, keyboards, organ, percussion, piano, vocals, arrangements
- Thomas Jefferson Kaye – guitar, backing vocals
- Chris Ethridge – bass
- Jim Gordon – baritone saxophone
- Jim Josea – soprano saxophone, alto saxophone, tenor saxophone
- Jerry Jumonville – tenor and alto saxophone
- George Bohanon – trombone
- Richard "Blue" Mitchell – trumpet
- Jessie Hill – vocals, backing vocals
- Lorraine Rebennack – bass, backing vocals
- Freddie Staehle – drums
- John Boudreaux – percussion
- Bennie Parks – percussion
- Jessie Smith, Robbie Montgomery – backing vocals

Technical

- Pete Weiss, Roger Nichols, Tony Reale - engineer
- Ron Coro - art direction
- Jim Marshall – photography
