= Lake Cormorant, Mississippi =

- Unincorporated community
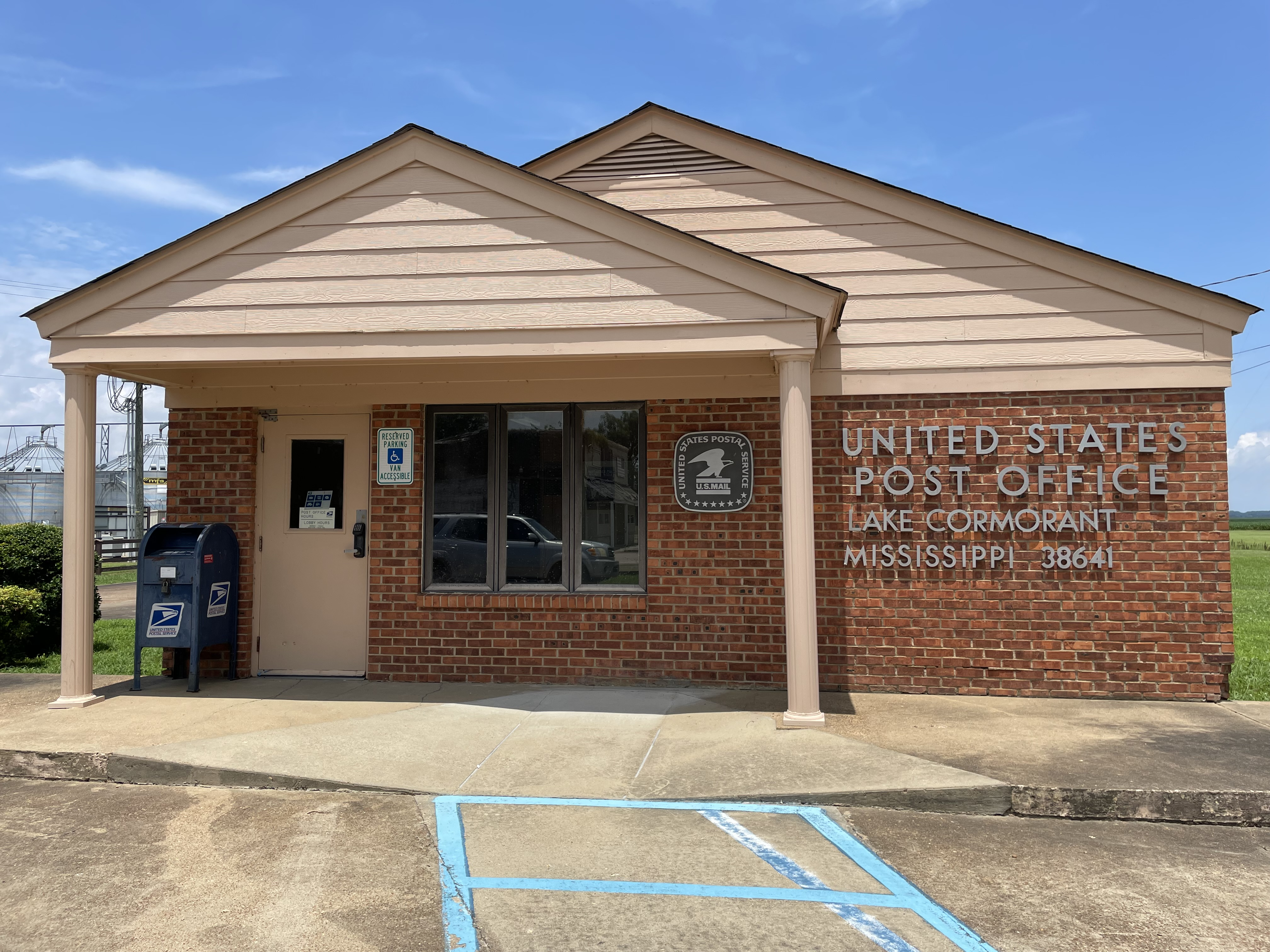
- The post office in Lake Cormorant

- Location within Mississippi Location within the United States
- Coordinates: 34°54′15″N 90°12′52″W
- Country: United States
- State: Mississippi
- County: DeSoto
- Elevation: 207 ft (63 m)
- Time zone: UTC-6 (Central (CST))
  - Summer (DST): UTC-5 (CDT)
- ZIP code: 38641
- Area code: 662
- GNIS feature ID: 690253

Lake Cormorant is an unincorporated community located in DeSoto County, Mississippi, United States. Lake Cormorant is adjacent to the town of Walls and is 19 miles (31 km) north of North Tunica near U.S. Route 61.

Lake Cormorant has a post office and a zip code of 38641.

Klack's General Store in Lake Cormorant is where blues singer Son House was recorded for the Library of Congress in 1941.

== History ==
Just to the east of the community is the Lake Cormorant site of a former Mississippian culture Quizquiz village, which is likely one visited by Hernando de Soto in 1542.

== Geography ==
Lake Cormorant lies in the flood plain of the Mississippi River, just south of a former oxbow lake channel of that river. It is just east of Lake Cormorant Bayou, another channel remnant of the river, and now a tributary of the Coldwater River, a yazoo stream.

Levees and floodways built under the federal Flood Control Act of 1928 divert water away from the hamlet, and into the Lake Cormorant Bayou.

=== Climate ===
The climate in this area is characterized by hot, humid summers and generally mild to cool winters. According to the Köppen Climate Classification system, Lake Cormorant has a humid subtropical climate, abbreviated "Cfa" on climate maps.

== Transportation ==
Amtrak’s City of New Orleans, which operates between New Orleans and Chicago, passes through the town on CN tracks, but makes no stop. The nearest station is located in Memphis, 21 miles (34 km) to the north.

== Notable people ==
- Tommy Bankhead, blues musician.
- Joe Henderson, professional baseball player in the 1970s.

== Gallery ==
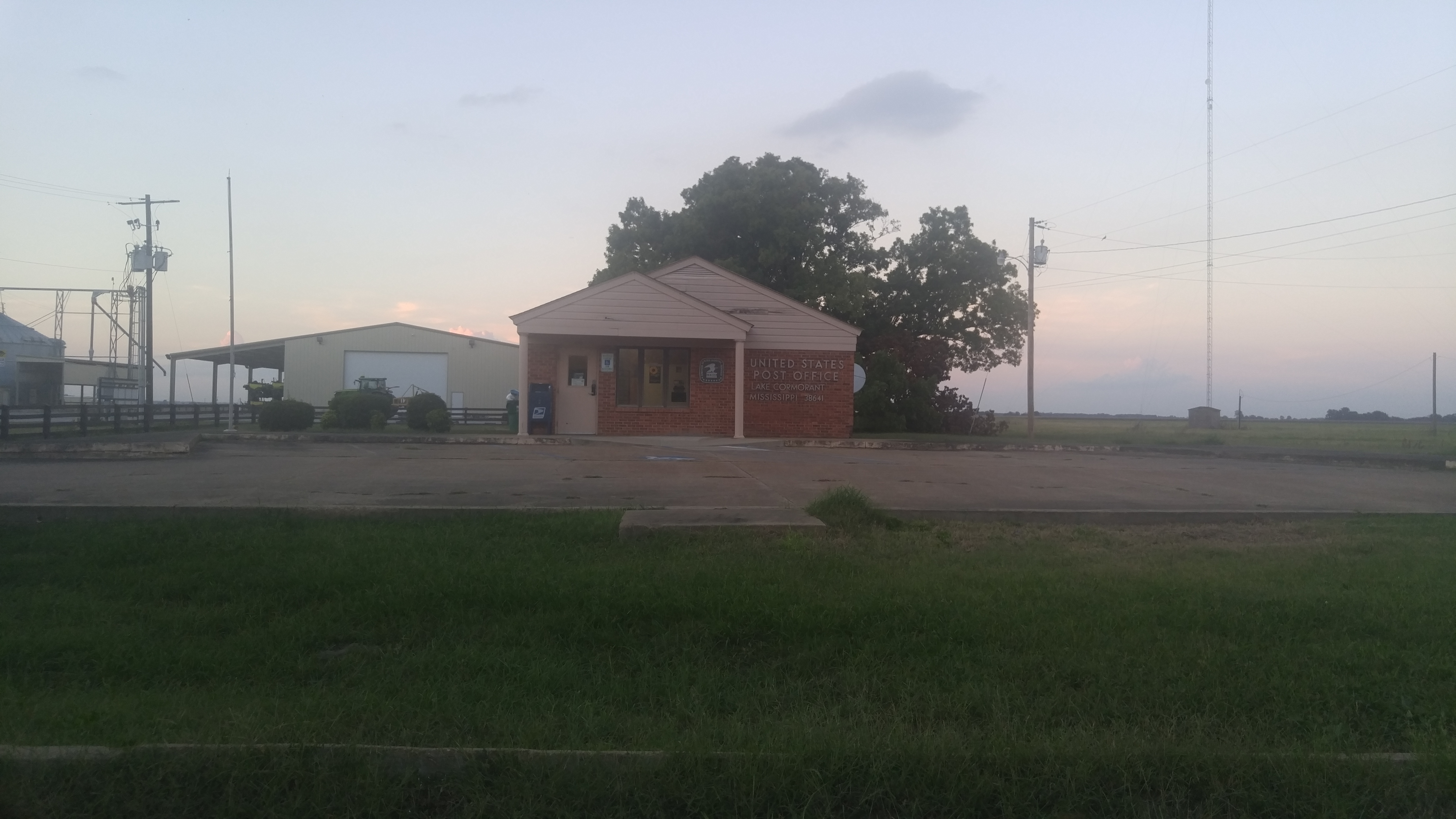
Post Office

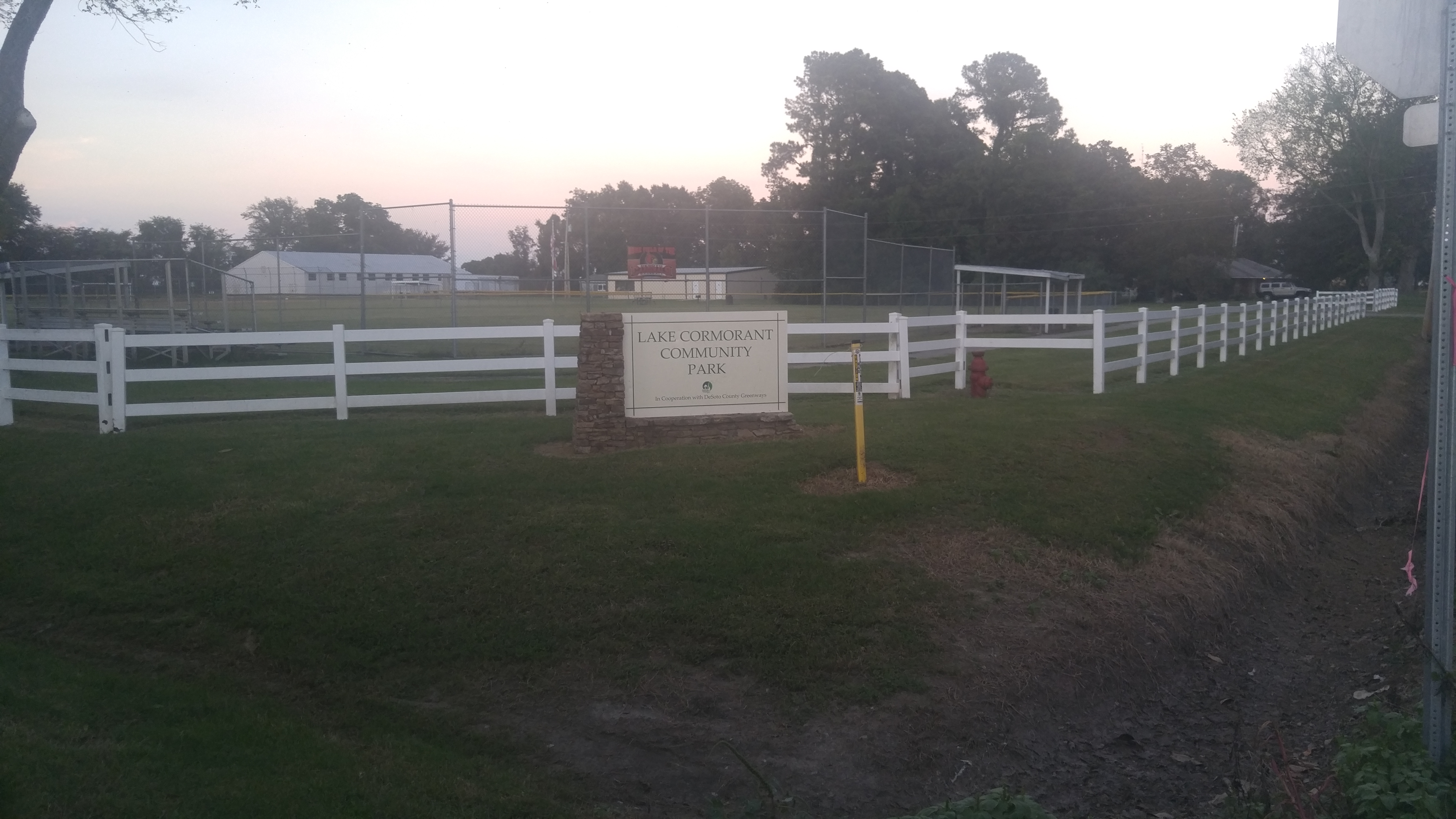
Community Park
