= Billy Gayles =

American drummer

- Gayles as a member of the Kings of Rhythm (1956)

Background information
- Also known as: Willie King; Billy Gale
- Born: Willie James Gayles; October 19, 1931; Sikeston, Missouri, U.S.
- Died: April 8, 1993 (aged 61) St. Louis, Missouri, U.S.
- Genres: Blues, R&B
- Occupations: Musician, singer
- Instrument: Drums
- Years active: 1950s−1990s
- Formerly of: Ike Turner; Kings of Rhythm; Otis Rush

Billy Gayles (October 19, 1931 – April 8, 1993) was an American rhythm & blues drummer and vocalist. Gayles was a member of Ike Turner's Kings of Rhythm in the 1950s with whom he recorded for Flair Records and Federal Records as the lead vocalist. Gayles also backed various musicians, including Earl Hooker, Robert Nighthawk, Otis Rush, Albert King, and Richard Arnold "Groove" Holmes.

== Life and career ==
Willie James Gayles was born in Sikeston, Missouri on October 19, 1931. He became interested in blues and jazz music after he moved to Cairo, Illinois as a teenager. Gayles learned to play the drums and toured with blues musicians Earl Hooker and Robert Nighthawk.

In the early 1950s, he relocated to Clarksdale, Mississippi. In March 1954, Gayles recorded with Ike Turner's King's of Rhythm, resulting in the release of the Turner-penned single "Night Howler" / "My Heart In Your Hands" on Flair Records. By 1956, Gayles had joined the band now based in East St. Louis, mainly as a vocalist. That year, Turner took the band to Cincinnati to record for Federal Records. The single, "I'm Tore Up" / "If I Never Had Known You," featuring Gayles singing lead, became a regional hit. Gayles briefly left Turner's band to pursue a solo career. He returned to the band as a drummer. In 1958, Gayles traveled to Chicago with Turner to record for Cobra Records. Gayles and Turner sang on the Cobra release "Walking Down The Aisle," the B-side to "Box Top." They also backed Otis Rush in a Cobra session that produced the singles "Double Trouble" and "All Your Love (I Miss Loving)."

Gayles performed off-and-on with Turner until 1963. He later formed his own band and played around St. Louis. Gayles backed blues musician Larry Davis on his 1982 album Funny Stuff. In 1986 and 1987, Gayles toured Europe with several original members of the Kings of Rhythm, including Clayton Love, Erskine Oglesby, Stacy Johnson, Oliver Sain, and former Ikette Robbie Montgomery as part of the St. Louis Kings of Rhythm. Mayor Vincent Schoemehl officially appointed them as ambassadors for the City of St. Louis.

In the early 1990s, Gayles played in a band called Billy and the Preachers.

After being hospitalized for three months at St. Louis Regional Medical Center, Gayles died from inoperable cancer at the age of 61 on April 8, 1993. He is buried at Friedens Cemetery & Mausoleum in St. Louis. In 2015 the Killer Blues Headstone Project placed a headstone for him at Fiedens cemetery in St. Louis.

== Discography ==
=== Singles ===
==== Billy Gale and His Orchestra ====
- 1954: "Night Howler" / "My Heart In Your Hands" (Flair 1031)

==== Billy Gayles with Ike Turner's Rhythm Rockers ====
- 1956: "I'm Tore Up" / "If I Never Had Known You" (Federal 12265)

==== Billy Gayles ====
- 1956: "Take Your Fine Frame Home" / "Let's Call It A Day" (Federal 12272)
- 1963: "I'm Hurting" / "Dreaming Of You" (Shock 200)

==== Billy Gayles with Ike Turner's Kings of Rhythm ====
- 1956: "Do Right Baby" / "No Coming Back" (Federal 12282)
- 1956: "Just One More Time" / "Sad As A Man Can Be" (Federal 12287)

==== Willie King with The Ike Turner Band ====
- 1956: "Peg Leg Woman" / "Mistreating Me" (Vita V-123)

==== Seaphus Scott, The Five Masquerades And Billy Gale Orch. ====
- 1958: "Nature's Beauty" / "Summer Sunrise" (Joyce 303)

==== Ike Turner's Kings of Rhythm ====
- 1959: "Walking Down The Aisle" (Cobra 5033)

=== Albums ===
==== Featured appearances ====
- 1985: Ike Turner & His Kings Of Rhythm – Ike Turner & His Kings Of Rhythm Vol. 2 (Ace Records)
- 1986: St. Louis Kings Of Rhythm – St. Louis Kings Of Rhythm (Timeless Records)
- 1989: R&B Confidential No.1: The Flair Label (Ace Records)
- 1993: Ike Turner – Rocks The Blues (P-Vine Records)
- 2008: Ike Turner – Classic Early Sides 1952–1957 (JSP Records)

==== As a sideman ====
- 1982: Larry Davis – Funny Stuff (Rooster Blues Records)
- 1989: Otis Rush – The Cobra Sessions 1956–1958 (P-Vine Records)
- 1993: The Cobra Records Story (Capricorn Records)
