= Skyliner Ballroom =

Nightclub in Fort Worth, Texas

The Skyliner Ballroom was a nightclub located on Jacksboro Highway in Fort Worth, Texas. It was opened in the late 1930s and operated until 1966. The Skyliner evolved over the years, hosting big bands, jazz, burlesque, blues, and eventually rock & roll acts.

== History ==
The Skyliner Ballroom was opened by recording artist George Campbell and his partner Gene Hames who wanted to capitalize on the growing entertainment business in Fort Worth. When it opened, the Skyliner was the largest dance hall in Fort Worth, with a capacity of 500. The venue featured a mural of the Fort Worth skyline.

Popular local bands and national acts performed at the Skyliner such as Denny Beckner and Louis Armstrong. The Skyliner entertained black and white audiences, but not on the same night. In 1953, the venue was raided for "moral perversions" when authorities were notified that white men were performing with black women.

Hames and Campbell could not afford to continue operating the Skyliner, so they sold it to F. A. Florence, who eventually sold it to W. D. Satterwhite. Satterwhite hired a cast of female impersonators called the Jewel Box Revue, which increased business. By 1954, Satterwhite sold the Skyliner to Jimmy Levens and his partner, Emmett Spinks. Levens hired strippers Sherry Lynn and Tammi True to entertain guests.

In 1964, Ike & Tina Turner recorded their performance at the Skyliner (along with their show at Lovall's Ballroom in Dallas), and the recordings were subsequently released as two volumes.

The Skyliner closed after Levens died in 1966. In 1969, the abandoned building was condemned by city inspectors and demolished.

== Notable performers ==
- Charlie Applewhite
- Louis Armstrong
- Bruce Channel
- Nick Lucas
- Delbert McClinton
- Moon Mullican
- Sally Rand
- Jimmy Reed
- Ray Sharpe
- Mitch Torok
- Ike & Tina Turner
- Rudy Vallee
- Howlin' Wolf

== Live albums ==
- 1965: Live! The Ike & Tina Turner Show – Ike & Tina Turner
- 1967: The Ike & Tina Turner Show – Vol. 2 – Ike & Tina Turner
