= Club Imperial =

Nightclub in St. Louis, Missouri, US

Coordinates: 38°42′48″N 90°15′20″W

The Club Imperial was a nightclub at 6306-28 West Florissant Ave in St. Louis, Missouri. During the club's heyday in the 1950s through the 1960s, acts such as Ike & Tina Turner, Chuck Berry, and Bob Kuban and the In-Men performed at the Club Imperial.

The Club Imperial was owned by George Edick who turned the nightclub into a private hall in the 1970s. In the last few decades, the building went through different ownership and was almost demolished in 2018, but preservationists fought to save the site of the historic music venue.

== History ==
The building which is the site of the Club Imperial at 6306-28 West Florissant Ave was built in 1928. It was a dance hall, bowling alley, and restaurant complex in an all-white neighborhood.

Chicago-born George S. Edick moved to St. Louis, Missouri in 1928. Edick purchased the venue and opened the Club Imperial with the music of Al Tucker & his Orchestra on March 22, 1952. Edick booked swing bands such as Stan Kenton's orchestra and Louis Prima for entertainment at the ballroom. Jazz musician Jimmy Forrest, known for his 1952 hit "Night Train," played piano at the club for years. By the mid-1950s, Rhythm & Blues was taking over the city as the word got across the river of the exciting bands in East St. Louis, Illinois.

In 1954, bandleader Ike Turner relocated his Kings of Rhythm from Clarksdale to East St. Louis where he built the Club Manhattan nightclub. Edick got word of the buzz about Turner and booked his band to revitalize the Club Imperial. Turner's King's of Rhythm became the hottest attraction in the St. Louis music scene, attracting black and white audiences. DJ Gabriel (Mitchell Hearns) remembered: "Ike Turner just took over this area. He created a ripple effect with his energy and ambition, he sent word back to Mississippi and was followed here by Albert King and Little Milton, he was a premier blues pianist who later became a great guitarist."

After Ike & Tina Turner attained success with their single "A Fool In Love" and moved to California, they continued to occasionally perform at the Club Imperial. They recorded their first live album, Ike & Tina Turner Revue Live, at the club in 1964. Greg Edick, son of the owner George S. Edick, grew up in the club and later took over ownership. He recalled that Jimi Hendrix was a guitarist in the Ike & Tina Turner Revue, but he was fired for his long solo that "brought the dancers to a halt." Hendrix met Jazz musician Miles Davis at the club, and Davis remarked that Hendrix's guitar sounded like a "machine gun." The Turners were performing at the club in 1966 when the Rolling Stones paid a visit and invited them to be the opening act on their 1966 British tour.

In the 1950s, a type of swing dance known as the "Imperial Style" originated at the Club Imperial. Tommy Clements's dance studio, The Tommy Clements School of Dance, was located at the Club Imperial.

In 1959, Edick hosted a television show at the Club Imperial, TV Party, which was broadcast on KTVI-2.

In the early 1970s, Edick closed the nightclub and ran the Club Imperial as a banquet and reception hall. After the nightclub closed, dancers formed the non-profit St. Louis Imperial Dance Club.

Edick died at the age of 86 from congestive heart failure on June 11, 2002.

In August 2017, Robert Vroman bought the building in an auction with the intention of finding a buyer to renovate it. By 2018, no one had offered to buy the building for renovation and Vroman concluded that it was too dilapidated to save. A beauty products company wanted to buy the building and demolish it to build a new structure. In January 2018, The St. Louis Preservation Board unanimously denied a demolition permit for the former Club Imperial.
