= Jimmy Thomas =

American soul singer and songwriter (1939–2022)

- Born: January 20, 1939; Osceola, Arkansas, U.S.
- Died: April 25, 2022 (aged 83) Hammersmith, London, England
- Genres: Soul; R&B
- Occupation: Singer-songwriter
- Years active: 1958–2022
- Labels: Sue; Sonja; Mirwood; Osceola
- Website: osceolarecords.co.uk

Jimmy Thomas (January 20, 1939 – April 25, 2022) was an American soul singer and songwriter. He was best known as a vocalist for Ike Turner. Thomas joined Turner's Kings of Rhythm in 1958, and remained with the band when the Ike & Tina Turner Revue was formed in 1960. He released solo singles on Turner's labels Sue, Sputnik, and Sonja Records. After his departure from Turner, Thomas continued recording as a solo artist, eventually relocating to London. He formed his own label, Osceola Records, in 1979.

== Life and career ==
=== Early life ===
Thomas was born in Osceola, Arkansas on January 20, 1939. Raised by his aunt and uncle, Thomas grew up listening to blues musicians such as Big Maceo, Tampa Red, Walter Davis, and Sonny Boy Williamson. In his teens, Thomas formed his first band called the Rock and Roll Trays. They performed popular R&B and blues tunes in clubs around Osceola. In 1958, Albert King recommended that Thomas travel to East St. Louis and audition for a spot as a vocalist in Ike Turner's band the Kings of Rhythm.

=== Kings of Rhythm ===
By 1956, Ike Turner and his Kings of Rhythm were one of the most popular live attractions in the St. Louis and East St. Louis club scene. In 1958, Turner was looking for a new vocalist following the departure of Clayton Love. Thomas replaced Love and was soon joined by singer Tommy Hodge. Around the time Thomas and Hodge joined the Kings of Rhythm, Turner shifted from his usual blues oriented sound to producing R&B material. That year, Thomas made his recording debut during the group's Cobra Records sessions in Chicago. He was featured on Turner's singles released on Stevens Records in 1959. In St. Louis, Thomas also performed with Benny Sharp, Eugene Neal, and Albert King.

=== Ike and Tina Turner Revue ===
In 1960, Turner wrote "A Fool in Love" for Art Lassiter. When Lassiter failed to show up for the recording session, one of Turner's background vocalists, Little Ann, sang the lead. Little Ann was renamed Tina Turner, and the single was released on Sue Records. Following the success of the single, Turner formed the Ike & Tina Turner Revue which included the Kings of Rhythm and a trio of female vocalists called the Ikettes. In 1961, Thomas and Ikette Wilhelmina Weaver (as Jimmy & Jean) released the single "I Can't Believe" / "I Want Marry You" on Sue. After Ike & Tina had a string of hit records, Turner relocated the band to Los Angeles in 1962. When the hits dried up they began to tour vigorously. Thomas recalled, "We would only be in L.A. three months out of the year, we be touring like nine months." Since they couldn't rely on records, the revue strengthened their live act by added dance routines. Thomas and Tina Turner would change the routines and have dance battles onstage.

In 1962, Thomas released his single "You Can Go"/"Hurry And Come Home" on Sue Records. In between touring, Turner formed multiple record labels to release singles. Thomas released solo singles on Turner's labels Sputnik and Sonja. In 1964, the revue released their first live album, Ike & Tina Turner Revue Live, which features Thomas' rendition of "Feel So Good" by Junior Parker. His rendition of "Down In The Valley" is included on the revue's follow-up live album, Live! The Ike & Tina Turner Show, released in 1965.

=== Solo career ===
While the Ike & Tina Turner Revue were touring the UK with the Rolling Stones in 1966, Thomas befriended producers Denny Cordell and Tony Visconti, who invited him to learn production. Thomas released the single "Where There's a Will (There's a Way)" on Mirwood Records in 1966. After leaving Ike & Tina Turner, he worked local jobs in Los Angeles before relocating to London in 1969. He began producing his own solo records such as the Northern soul classic "The Beautiful Night" released on Parlophone in 1969. In 1973, Thomas wrote and produced a solo LP, Abyss, released on Contempo, a London label owned by John Abbey, founder of Blues and Soul magazine. Thomas formed his own label, Osceola Records, in 1979.

Beginning in the 1970s, Thomas provided background vocals for various acts, including Gary Wright, David Essex, Voyage, Mikael Rickfors, Lloyd Cole & The Commotions, Madness, Miguel Bosé, Blue Mercedes, and Kevin Rowland.

=== Death ===
His death in April 2022 was confirmed online by his friend P. P. Arnold.

Jimmy Thomas was buried alongside his wife Kathleen in Dallington, Northamptonshire, UK.

== Discography ==
=== Albums ===
- 1973: Abyss

==== Ike and Tina Turner ====
- 1964: Ike & Tina Turner Revue Live
- 1965: Live! The Ike & Tina Turner Show
- 2012: Ike Turner Studio Productions: New Orleans and Los Angeles 1963–1965

=== Singles ===
- 1961: Jimmy & Jean – "I Can't Believe" / "I Want Marry You" (Sue 743)
- 1961: "I Must Be Crazy"/"Every Day I Wake Up Crying" (Play Back Record PO-0037A)
- 1962: "You Can Go"/"Hurry And Come Home" (Sue 778)
- 1963: "The Darkest Hour"/"The Little Cheater" (Sputnik 10001)
- 1964: "You've Tasted Anothers Lips"/"I Love Nobody But You" (Sonja 2004)
- 1966: "Where There's A Will"/"Just Trying To Please You" (Mirwood 5522)
- 1969: "The Beautiful Night"/"Above A Whisper" (Parlophone R 5773)
- 1970: "(We Ain't Here Looking For) No Trouble"/"Springtime" (Spark SRL 1035)
- 1971: "White Dove"/"You Don't Have To Say Goodbye" (Sire 45-4121)
- 1973: "All God's Children"/"The Weak-End Is Mine" (Contempo C 8)
- 1975: "Beautiful Night"/"I Can't Live My Life Without You" (20th Century Records BTC 1002)
- 1981: "Hang Right On In There"/"Driving Wheel" (Osceola Records OSC 2)
- 1982: "Standing Alone In A Crowd"/"Mister Are You Famous" (Cricket LBW 002)
- 2002: "We Got Togetherness"/"Secret Doors To Secret Places" (Smoke City SMC 9001)

==== Features ====
- 1959: "Jack Rabbit"/"In Your Eyes Baby" (Stevens 104) with Icky Renrut (alias for Ike Turner)
- 1959: "Hey – Hey"/"Ho – Ho" (Stevens 107) with Icky Renrut (alias for Ike Turner)
- 1980: "Just A Matter Of Time" (Laser LAS 34) with Zen

=== Backing vocal credits ===
- 1971: Street Singer – Mick Softley
- 1971: Footprint – Gary Wright
- 1972: Queues – Vigrass & Osborne
- 1973: Rock On – David Essex
- 1973: Now Hear This – Hanson
- 1976: Thunder into Our Hearts – Jabula
- 1978: Midnight Ride – Barbara Pennington
- 1981: One Step Higher – Voyage
- 1983: Blue Fun – Mikael Rickfors
- 1985: Easy Pieces – Lloyd Cole & The Commotions
- 1985: Mad Not Mad – Madness
- 1986: Salamandra – Miguel Bosé
- 1987: Face To Face – Barclay James Harvest
- 1988: Rich And Famous – Blue Mercedes
- 1988: When The Night Begins – Ellert
- 1999: My Beauty – Kevin Rowland
