= Tommy Bankhead =

American blues band member (1931–2000)

Tommy Bankhead (October 24, 1931 – December 16, 2000) was an American Delta blues guitarist and singer who played with Howlin' Wolf, Sonny Boy Williamson I, Elmore James (his cousin), Joe Willie Wilkins, Robert Nighthawk, and Joe Hill Louis. He sometimes played the bass guitar and harmonica. He released a few albums under his own name. In his later years, he toured as Tommy Bankhead and the Blues Eldoradoes.

== Life and career ==
Bankhead was born in Lake Cormorant, Mississippi on October 24, 1931. He moved to St. Louis, Missouri, in 1949. He formed his own bands, the Landrockers then the Blues Eldorados, and performed around clubs in the city. Bankhead was a fixture in St. Louis blues for over fifty years, playing with musicians such as Little Milton, Oliver Sain, Ike Turner, Henry Townsend, and Albert King. He also worked as a deputy sheriff and a security guard at times.

Bankhead died in St. Louis of respiratory failure due to emphysema on December 16, 2000. The Killer Blues Headstone Project placed the headstone for Tommy Bankhead at Laurel Cemetery in St. Louis.

== Discography ==
=== Albums ===
- 1983: Tommy Bankhead And The Blues Eldorados (Deep Morgan)
- 2000: Message To St. Louis (Fedora)
- 2001: Please Mr. Forman (Blue Sky)
- 2002: Please Accept My Love (Fedora)
