= Loma Records =

American subsidiary record label of Warner Bros

- Parent company: Warner Music Group
- Founded: 1964
- Founder: Mike Maitland
- Defunct: 1968
- Status: Defunct
- Distributor: Warner Bros. Records
- Genre: Soul, R&B
- Country of origin: United States

Loma Records was an American subsidiary record label of Warner Bros. Records managed by Bob Krasnow, and later by Russ Regan. Its name was derived from Eloma, a cleared copyright Warner owned.

== History ==
In March 1964, Warner Bros. president Mike Maitland announced the formation of Loma Records. Former promotional man and record producer Bob Krasnow was named the manager of the new label. Maitland explained the purpose of Loma was "an attempt to broaden singles coverage. There's so much product available through outside source, that we can afford to release it on Warner Bros., Reprise and now Loma." The first releases on the label were purchased masters.

R&B duo Ike & Tina Turner were one of the first signings to the label. Their single "Tell Her I'm Not Home" reached the Top 40 on the Billboard R&B chart in 1965. Most of the releases on Loma did not make a big impact on the charts, but in 1967, Linda Jones had two Top 10 R&B hits. Other artists on the roster included the Olympics, J.J. Jackson, Lorraine Ellison, the Mighty Hannibal, and Redd Foxx. Most artists on the label did not make it to LP status until the release of a two-CD set in 1995 called The Best of Loma Records.

Krasnow resigned as the manager of Loma in 1965 and was replaced by Russ Regan. In 1968, Loma's roster and back catalog were absorbed into Warner Bros. In 1995, a compilation of its singles called The Best of Loma Records: The Rise and Fall of a 1960's Soul Label was released.

In 2002, Loma was briefly reactivated for the release of the self-titled CD of the jazz trio Yaya^{3}, which featured drummer Brian Blade, saxophonist Joshua Redman, and keyboardist Sam Yahel.

== Roster ==
- The Olympics
- J.J. Jackson
- Lorraine Ellison
- Ike & Tina Turner
- The Mighty Hannibal
- Linda Jones
- Redd Foxx
- Bobby Freeman
- Lonnie Youngblood
- Bobby Bennett and The Dynamics
- Kell Osbourne
- Bob & Earl
- Roy Redmond
- The Realistics
- The Apollas
- Ben Aiken
- The Enchanters
- Baby Lloyd

== Selected discography ==
=== Albums ===
- 1966: The Both Sides Of Redd Foxx
- 1967: The Ike & Tina Turner Show — Vol. 2
- 1967: Redd Foxx — On The Loose: Recorded Live!
- 1967: Redd Foxx —"Live" Las Vegas!
- 1968: Redd Foxx — Foxx-A-Delic

=== Singles ===
Catalog No.	Release date	US	US R&B	Single (A-side, B-side)	Artist
2005	Oct 1964			"I'm The Lover Man" b/w "The Push Push Push"	Little Jerry Williams
2011	Feb 1965	108	33	"Tell Her I'm Not Home" b/w "I'm Thru With Love"	Ike & Tina Turner
2015	May 1965			"Somebody Needs You" b/w "(I'll Do Anything) Just to Be With You"	Ike & Tina Turner
2016	June 1965			"Soul Jerk (Part 1)" b/w "Soul Jerk (Part 2)"	Bobby Bennett and The Dynamics
2023	Dec 1965			"You Can't Outsmart A Woman" b/w "That's What's Happening"	Kell Osborne
2026	Jan 1966			"Hold On To Your Money" b/w "Don't You Have Feelings"	Little Joe Cook
2070	May 1967	21	4	"Hypnotized" b/w "I Can't Stop Lovin' My Baby"	Linda Jones
2077	Sep 1967	61	8	"What've I Done (To Make You Mad)" b/w "Make Me Surrender (Baby, Baby Please)"	Linda Jones
2080	Oct 1967			"I Got A Good Thing" b/w "Lies"	Bobby Freeman
2085	Dec 1967	93	34	"Give My Love A Try" b/w "I Can't Stand It"	Linda Jones
