= The Sharpees =

American R&B group

- Also known as: Benny Sharp & the Sharpies; Benny Sharp & the Zorros of Rhythm; Benny Sharp & His Orchestra; New Breed
- Origin: St. Louis, Missouri, U.S.
- Genres: Soul, R&B
- Label: One-derful
- Past members: Benny Sharp; Stacy Johnson; Herbert Reeves; Horise O'Toole; Vernon Guy

The Sharpees were an American R&B group based in St. Louis. The group originated from a band led by guitarist and bandleader Benny Sharp.

== History ==
The Sharpees were named after guitarist Benny Sharp. Sharp (1930 – 2019) was from Tupelo, Mississippi. He relocated to St. Louis in 1947 and formed his own band called Benny Sharp & the Zorros of Rhythm. At some point, the rest of the band consisted of "Bell Boy" Carter on drums, "Butter Cup" on saxophone, Mike Crowder on bass guitar, and Oliver Thomas on piano. In the 1950s, he earned the regarded as the next best bandleader behind Ike Turner in the St. Louis area. Sharp recruited Stacy Johnson (1945 – 2017) who was singing with the Arabians, Johnson's friend Vernon Guy (1945 – 1998) who sang with the Cool Sounds, and singer Horise O'Toole (1943 – c. 1965) from the Originals. An early incarnation of the band was called the New Breed. "Bell Boy" Carter did some singing with the group as well. They filled a void left by Ike & Tina Turner who relocated to Los Angeles in 1962. The band worked seven days a week and were not paid very much. Johnson recalled, "we didn't make a lot of money...but it was like a family thing." They released the single, "My Baby Has Gone" /" St. Louis Sunset Twist," on Chicago's Mel-O Records featuring Little Miss Jessie who went on to become an Ikette. For a brief period, Ikette Robbie Montgomery also sang with the group.

In 1962, Guy and Johnson left the group to join Ike & Tina Turner. Sharp brought in Herbert Reeves (1947 – 1972) as a vocalist. By late 1964, Guy had left the Turners. He along with Reeves and O'Toole formed the Sharpees. The group was managed by Mack McKinney and also included horn player Eddie Silvers. In 1965, A&R man Mack McKinney signed them to George Leaner's One-derful Records based in Chicago. They recorded their first single "Do the 45" at Oliver Sain's studio in St. Louis. The single sold well locally, particularly in Chicago. It reached No. 40 on the Cash Box R&B chart and No. 117 on Billboard's Bubbling Under The Hot 100. The groups 1960’s recording ‘Go On And Laugh’ with Herbert Reeves on lead vocal, has (belatedly) become a massive hit on the UK Northern Soul scene.

During the group's first tour that year, O'Toole succumbed to tuberculosis. He was replaced by former member Stacy Johnson, who had since left Ike & Tina Turner. The group went to Oner-derful's Chicago studio to record their next single, "Tired of Being Lonely," which became their biggest hit. The record reached several local charts and in February 1966, it reached No. 90 on the Cash Box Top 100 Singles. Now a nationally known act, the Sharpees toured the chitlin' circuit, and played at major theaters such as the Howard Theater in Washington D.C., the Apollo Theater in New York City, and the Regal Theater in Chicago on the same bill as Smokey Robinson & The Miracles and Stevie Wonder. In 1967, while they were touring with the Drifters they were given erroneous directions to the next gig. Guy and Johnson believe it was intentional because the Sharpees were a threat. Financial disputes caused the group to split up for a period of time.

Although, the group did not chart again they recorded sporadically. In 1969, the Sharpees teamed up with Benny Sharp for the single "Music (I Like It)," written by Sharp and Stacy Johnson, released on One-derful's sublabel Midas Records as Benny Sharp & the Sharpies. The Sharpees continued to perform around St. Louis even after Herbert Reeves was shot and killed in 1972, in retaliation for beating up a guy. In 1978, Sharp quit professional music and focused on religion, becoming an elder at the Refuge Temple in East St. Louis. Johnson continued to perform with Guy and Gwin Massey. In the mid 1980s, Guy and Johnson formed a newly reformed Sharpies which included Guy's nephew Paul Grady, but it was short-lived.

== Discography ==
=== Singles ===
- 1965: "Do The 45" / "Make Up Your Mind" (One-derful 4835) — reached No. 40 on the Cash Box R&B chart and No. 117 on Billboard's Bubbling Under The Hot 100
- 1965: "Tired Of Being Lonely" / "Just To Please You" (One-derful 4839) — reached No. 90 on the Cash Box Top 100
- 1966: "I've Got A Secret" / "Make Up Your Mind" (One-derful 4843) — reached No. 135 on Billboard's Bubbling Under The Hot 100
- 1966: "The Sock" / "My Girl Jean" (One-derful 4845)
- 1967: "Music (I Like It) (Part 1)" / "Music (I Like It) (Part 2)" (Midas 303) — Benny Sharp & The Sharpies
- 2014: "Take Me To Your Leader" / "Darkness Of The Night" (Secret Stash SSR-2003) — previously unreleased One-derful recordings
- 2016: "Go On And Laugh" / "Get It Together" (Secret Stash SSR-2005) — previously unreleased One-derful recordings

=== Album appearances ===
- 1967: The Marvlus Sound of R&B & Soul (President Records)
- 1998: One-Derful, Mar-V-Lus, Northern Soul (30 Rare Dancers From 60's Chicago) (Goldmine Soul Supply)
- 1998: Windy City Soul (Charly Records)
- 2005: Northern Soul: The Solid Gold Collection (Union Square Music)
- 2014: The One-Derful! Collection: One-Derful Records (Secret Stash)
