= Live! The Ike & Tina Turner Show =

1965 live album by Ike & Tina Turner

Live album by Ike & Tina Turner
- Released: January 1965
- Recorded: 1964
- Venues: Skyliner Ballroom (Fort Worth, Texas), Lovall's Ballroom (Dallas, Texas)
- Genre: Rhythm and blues
- Label: Warner Bros.
- Producer: Robert A. "Bumps" Blackwell

Ike & Tina Turner chronology
Ike & Tina Turner Revue Live (1964)	Live! The Ike & Tina Turner Show (1965)	The Greatest Hits of Ike & Tina Turner (1965)

Singles from Live! The Ike & Tina Turner Show
- 1. "Something's Got a Hold of Me" Released: 1966

Live! The Ike & Tina Turner Show is a live album by Ike & Tina Turner, released on Warner Bros. Records in 1965. In 1967, The Ike & Tina Turner Show – Vol. 2, consisting of different recordings from the same shows was released on Loma Records.

== Recording and release ==
Since their inception as Ike & Tina Turner in 1960, the duo had been signed to Sue Records. After four years with Sue, they signed with Kent Records. Known for their live performances, their first live album, Ike & Tina Turner Revue Live, charted on Cash Box's Top Albums chart in January 1965. However, their Kent deal failed to produce any hits, so they signed with Loma Records.

Live! The Ike & Tina Turner Show was released on Loma's parent label, Warner Bros. Records. It was recorded live at the Skyliner Ballroom (Fort Worth, Texas) and the Lovall's Ballroom (Dallas, Texas) in 1964. The album features performances by Ikettes Venetta Fields and Jessie Smith, and vocalist Jimmy Thomas. Released in January 1965, the album was Ike & Tina Turner's first album to reach the Billboard charts, peaking at No. 126 on Billboard Top LPs and No. 8 on Hot R&B LPs.

Ike & Tina Turner's cover of "Something's Got a Hold on Me" by Etta James was released as a single in Norway retitled "Something's Got a Hold of Me".

== Critical reception ==
Billboard (February 6, 1965): "The husband and wife team have hit with a few pop and r&b hits in the past. Their hits have always been exciting. Here they go the same route with a pounding, driving, wailing sound. Chorus and big brass, plus hubby, give Tina's wailing great support."

Cash Box (February 20, 1965):

The hearty rhythm and blues sound of Ike and Tina Turner should sell up a storm among their fans on this new set from Warner Brothers. The 'live' taping was made at two separate shows, and exhibits all the drive and verve that has made the pair popular for many years. Guesting on the set are Jimmy Thomas, Vanetta Fields and Jessie Smith. Great soul sounds include: 'Something's Got a Hold on Me', 'You Are My Sunshine', and 'Twist and Shout'. There should be no trouble in marketing this platter in r&b areas, and it could well grab some pop exposure.

Professional ratings
Review scores
Source	Rating
AllMusic	4/5 stars
Record Mirror	4/5 stars

Reviewing the compilation Live! The Ike & Tina Turner Show (Volume I & II), Bruce Eder of AllMusic wrote:

Not only is the sound superb and the performance of the band spot-on, but Tina Turner is in exceptionally good voice. The range of material—from R&B standards like 'Hi Heel Sneakers' (done here as 'Tight Pants') to country-pop songs such as 'I Can't Stop Loving You'—is not only astounding, but a brilliant showcase for the duo and their band.

== Reissues ==
In 1969, Warner Bros. released Ike & Tina Turner's Greatest Hits, which contains songs from Live! The Ike & Tina Turner Show and The Ike & Tina Turner Show – Vol. 2.

Live! The Ike & Tina Turner Show was reissued in 1970 as On Stage by Valiant Records in the UK. It was also reissued in 1971 as Something's Got a Hold on Me by Harmony Records with three tracks removed.

In 2000, Live! The Ike & Tina Turner Show was reissued by One Way Records on compilation CD Live! The Ike & Tina Turner Show (Volume I & II). In 2006, Live! The Ike & Tina Turner Show (Volume I & II) was reissued on CD by DBK Works.

== Track listing ==
All songs lead vocal by Tina Tuner except where noted.

Side A
No.	Title	Writer(s)	Length
1.	"Finger Poppin'"	Ike Turner	2:25
2.	"Down in the Valley" (Jimmy Thomas)		2:35
3.	"Good Times"	Sam Cooke	2:45
4.	"You Are My Sunshine" (Ike & Tina Turner)	Charles Mitchell, Jimmie Davis	2:15
5.	"Good Time Tonight (Having a Good Time)" (Vanetta Fields)	Smokey McAllister	2:45
6.	"Twist and Shout"	Bert Berns, Phil Medley	3:45

Side B
No.	Title	Writer(s)	Length
1.	"Something's Got a Hold on Me"	Etta James, Leroy Kirkland, Pearl Woods	3:16
2.	"I Know (You Don't Want Me No More)" (Tina Turner & Vanetta Fields)	Barbara George	3:15
3.	"High Heel Sneakers (Tight Pants)"	Robert Higginbotham	3:08
4.	"My Man, He's a Lovin' Man" (Jessie Smith)	James Bennett, Johnnie Mae Matthews	2:50
5.	"I Can't Stop Loving You"	Don Gibson	3:35
6.	"Tell the Truth"	Ray Charles	2:35

== Chart performance ==
Chart (1965)	Peak position
US Billboard Hot R&B LPs	8
US Billboard Top LPs	126
US Cash Box Looking Ahead Albums	103
US Record World LP's Coming Up	108

== The Ike & Tina Turner Show – Vol. 2 ==
The Ike & Tina Turner Show – Vol. 2

Live album by Ike & Tina Turner
- Released: January 1967
- Recorded: 1964
- Venues: Skyliner Ballroom (Fort Worth, Texas), Lovall's Ballroom (Dallas, Texas)
- Label: Loma Records
- Producer: Robert A. "Bumps" Blackwell

Ike & Tina Turner chronology
River Deep – Mountain High (1966)	The Ike & Tina Turner Show – Vol. 2 (1967)	So Fine (1968)

The Ike & Tina Turner Show – Vol. 2 is the follow-up album to Live! The Ike & Tina Turner Show. Released by Loma Records in January 1967, the album was recorded at the same concerts as its predecessor. In 1969, the album was reissued as Ooh Poo Pah Doo by Harmony Records and received a 4 star rating from Billboard.

=== Critical reception ===
Professional ratings
Review scores
Source	Rating
Billboard	4/4 stars

Cash Box (February 4, 1967):

"The Ike And Tina Turner Show (Vol. 2)" is a rousing, wailing package that might easily establish itself as a big sales item in R&B circles. Among the numbers on the set are "Shake A Tail Feather", "You Must Believe Me", "Somebody (Somewhere) Needs You", and "Keep On A Pushin'". This one could really happen for Ike and Tina Turner.

Billboard (February 11, 1967): "Proved successes, Ike and Tina Turner whip up a live show package of tunes here that could be a chart winner. Songs include 'It's All Over,' 'A Fool for You,' and 'Shake a Tail Feather.' Real Soul.

=== Track listing ===
All songs sang lead by Tina Tuner except where noted.

Side A
No.	Title	Writer(s)	Length
1.	"Shake a Tail Feather" (Tina Turner & the Ikettes)	Otha Hayes, Verlie Rice, Andre Williams	3:03
2.	"You Must Believe in Me" (Tina Turner & the Ikettes)	Curtis Mayfield	2:55
3.	"Ooh Poo Pah Doo"	Jessie Hill	3:25
4.	"Early in the Mornin'"	Dallas Bartley, Leo Hickman, Louis Jordan	2:15
5.	"All I Can Do Is Cry"	Berry Gordy Jr., Gwendolyn Gordy, Roquel Davis	5:30

Side B
No.	Title	Writer(s)	Length
1.	"Somebody (Somewhere) Needs You" (Tina Turner & the Ikettes)	Frank Wilson	2:35
2.	"Keep On a Pushin'" (Tina Turner & the Ikettes)	Curtis Mayfield	2:33
3.	"It's All Over"	Ike Turner	3:15
4.	"You're No Good" (Tina Turner & the Ikettes)	Clint Ballard Jr.	2:55
5.	"A Fool for You"	Ray Charles	5:15
