= Big Bad Smitty =

American singer (1940–2002)

John Henry Smith, better known as Big Bad Smitty (February 11, 1940 – April 3, 2002) was an American blues guitar player and singer. Born in Vicksburg, Mississippi, United States, he started learning guitar at the age of ten. He would play his older brother Nelson's guitar when nobody was around.

When he was in his 20s he worked as a truck driver. Johnny Vincent of Ace Records had recorded him and two of his songs, "Smokestack Lightnin'" and "How Many More Years" appeared on the Genuine Mississippi Blues anthology on the Ace label in 1970.

He recorded the Mean Disposition album in 1991, which was released on the Black Magic label in Europe and the GENES label in the United States. He recorded three albums and appeared at European blues festivals, performing for large crowds. In 1993, Smitty was affected by a stroke.

He died in Jackson, Mississippi on April 3, 2002, as a result of diabetes. His funeral was held on April 13 at the Alpha Omega Baptist Church in Jackson, Mississippi.

A benefit concert was held for the family of Big Bad Smitty at BB's in St. Louis.

In 2025 the Killer Blues Headstone Project placed the headstone for John Henry Smith at Autumn Woods Cemetery in Jackson, Mississippi.

== Releases ==
- Mean Disposition (1991)
