= Clayton Love =

American pianist (1927–2010)

- Born: November 16, 1927; Mattson, Mississippi, U.S.
- Died: February 28, 2010 (aged 82) St. Louis, Missouri, U.S.
- Occupations: Singer, musician, bandleader
- Instrument: Piano
- Labels: Trumpet, Aladdin, Federal, Bobbin, Groove
- Formerly of: Kings of Rhythm

Clayton D. Love Jr. (November 16, 1927 – February 28, 2010) was an American blues pianist, who led his own band, the Shufflers, in the early 1950s. He was later a vocalist in Ike Turner's band, the Kings of Rhythm.

== Biography ==
Love was born in Mattson, Mississippi, and grew up in Clarksdale. While in high school, he studied trombone under Consuella Carter. He was also taught band theory and techniques by Dr. E. G. Mason. At the age of sixteen, he lied about his age to enlist in the US Navy during World War II in 1944. He was sent to Camp Shoemaker in Dublin, California, the Philippines, and Guam where he developed his piano skills.

After his discharge he studied as a pre-med at Alcorn Agricultural and Mechanical College near Vicksburg. He began performing in Vicksburg clubs with his band, the Shufflers, before graduating in 1949. His cousin, bandleader Earl Reed, recommended him to the owner of Trumpet Records, Lillian McMurry, and he first recorded for the label in 1951. The next year he began recording for the Aladdin label, with Raymond Hill's band, and over the following years also recorded for the Modern and Groove labels.

In the mid-1950s he moved to St. Louis and joined Ike Turner's Kings of Rhythm, singing lead vocals on the tracks "Do You Mean It," "She Made My Blood Run Cold," and "The Big Question," released on Federal Records. He also recorded under his own name for the local Bobbin record label, backed by a band led by bass player Roosevelt Marks. Love later played on his own and for the sharpies, then he went back to college. He received a master's degree from Saint Louis University in 1972, then taught elementary school in the St. Louis public school system. He later became an administrator at Vashon High School.

Love continued to perform during the blues revival scene of the 1980s and early 1990s. In 1986 and 1987, Love toured Europe with former members of the Kings of Rhythm, Jimmy Hinds, Billy Gayles, Erskine Oglesby, Stacy Johnson, Oliver Sain and former Ikette Robbie Montgomery, as part of the St. Louis Kings of Rhythm. The St. Louis Kings of Rhythm were officially appointed ambassadors for the City of St. Louis by Mayor Vincent Schoemehl in 1987.

In 1991, he recorded an album, Rockin' Eighty-Eights, with fellow piano players Johnnie Johnson and Jimmy Vaughn.

Love suffered a stroke on Thanksgiving of 2009, followed by a heart attack on Christmas. He died in hospice care on February 28, 2010, after having been ill for some years with arthritis and dementia. He was survived by his wife Joyce Love; son Greyling Love; daughters Cheryl Love, Joann Johnson, Gail Love and Mia Love; sister Mildred Chavers; and several grandchildren and great-grandchildren.

== Discography ==
=== Albums ===
- 1980: Come On Home Blues: From The Carousel Club St. Louis Missouri (Red Lightnin')
- 1991: Rockin' Eighty-Eights (Modern Blues Recordings)

=== Singles ===
- 1951: "Shufflin' With Love" / "Susie" (Trumpet 138) – Clayton Love and his Shufflers
- 1952: "Chained to Your Love" / "Where I Want to Be" (Aladdin 3148) – Clayton Love with Ray Hill and his Orchestra
- 1954: "Wicked Little Baby" / "Why Don't You Believe In Me" (Modern 929) – Clayton Love
- 1956: "Bye Bye Baby" / "Mary Lou" (Groove 0162) – Clayton Love Orchestra
- 1957: "Do You Mean It" / "She Made My Blood Run Cold" (Federal 12297) – Ike Turner and his Kings of Rhythm
- 1957: The Big Question" (Federal 12304) – Ike Turner and his Kings of Rhythm
- 1957: "You've Changed My Love" (Federal 12307) – Ike Turner and his Kings of Rhythm
- 1958: "Limited Love" / "Unlimited Love" (Bobbin 102) – Roosevelt Marks Orchestra With Clayton Love
- 1959: "Bye Bye, Baby" / "Mistreated" (Bobbin 108) – Roosevelt Marks Orchestra With Clayton Love
