= Kent Records =

American record label

- Founded: 1958
- Founder: Bihari brothers
- Country of origin: United States
- Location: Los Angeles

Kent Records was a Los Angeles–based record label, launched in 1958 by the Bihari brothers. It was a subsidiary of Crown Records Corporation. Kent was a follow-up to Modern Records, which ceased operations in 1958. The label reissued Modern's singles, including recordings by B.B. King. By 1964, Kent had signed acts such as Ike & Tina Turner and released new material. Other acts signed to the label included Z.Z. Hill, Johnny Otis, and Lowell Fulson. Modern Records was revived in 1964 with successful singles from the Ikettes.

Initially, Kent issued only singles, but issued albums from 1964 until the early 1970s. Kent was later bought by Ace Records, England, which uses the label name to release Motown and Northern Soul music.

Currently, ACE Records in the UK and P-VINE hold the rights to Kent Records.

== Selected Discography ==
=== Albums ===
- 1964: B.B. King, Rock Me Baby...14 Great Hits (compilation)
- 1964: B.B. King, Let Me Love You
- 1964: Ike & Tina Turner Revue Live
- 1965: Live! B.B. King on Stage
- 1965: Lowell Fulson, Soul
- 1965: Z.Z. Hill, The Soul Stirring Z.Z. Hill
- 1966: Ike & Tina Turner, The Soul of Ike & Tina
- 1967: Lowell Fulson, Tramp
- 1967: B.B. King, The Jungle
- 1967: Smokey Hogg, Original Folk Blues
- 1967: Z.Z. Hill, A Whole Lot of Soul
- 1967: B.B. King, Boss of the Blues (compilation)
- 1967: Lowell Fulson, Now!
- 1968: B.B. King, From the Beginning (compilation)
- 1968: The Johnny Otis Show featuring Mighty Mouth Evans & Shuggie Otis, Cold Shot!
- 1970: Ike & Tina, Festival of Live Performances
- 1970: Preston Love's Omaha Bar-B-Q
- 1970: Big Joe Turner, Turns on the Blues
- 1970: Various Artists – Rock and Roll Festival, Volume 1
- 1970: Neil Merryweather, John Richardson And Boers
- 1970: B.B. King, Turn on to B.B. King (compilation)
- 1970: Guitar Slim Green featuring Johnny and Shuggie Otis, Stone Down Blues
- 1971: The Greatest Hits of B.B. King, Volume 1 (compilation)
- 1971: The Great Roy Milton, Roots Of Rock, Vol. 1 (compilation)
- 1971: Z.Z. Hill's Greatest Hits: Dues Paid in Full (compilation)
- 1973: B.B. King, The Original Sweet Sixteen (compilation)

=== Singles ===
Catalog No.	Release date	US	US R&B	Single (A-side, B-side)	Artist
315	Oct 1958		16	"You've Been An Angel"	B.B. King
315	Oct 1958		9	"Please Accept My Love"	B.B. King
330	Dec 1959		2	"Sweet Sixteen, Pt. 1" b/w "Sweet Sixteen, Pt. 2"	B.B. King
345	1960			"Roll With Me Henry" b/w "Good Rockin' Daddy" [reissues]	Etta James
346	Jul 1960			"Good Man Gone Bad"	B.B. King
346	Jul 1960		8	"Partin' Time"	B.B. King
378	Apr 1962			"Drifting" b/w "Love You Baby"	Bobby "Blue" Bland, Ike Turner and His Orchestra
393	May 1964	34	12	"Rock Me Baby" b/w "I Can't Lose"	B.B. King
394	Apr 1964			"Dust My Blues (I Believe)" b/w "Happy Home"	Elmore James and The Broom Dusters
396	Aug 1964	107		"You're Gonna Miss Me"	B.B. King
396	Aug 1964	110	15	"Let Me Love You"	B.B. King
402	Oct 1964	95		"I Can't Believe What You Say (For Seeing What You Do)" b/w "My Baby Now"	Ike & Tina Turner
409	Nov 1964			"Please, Please, Please" b/w "Am I A Fool In Love"	Ike & Tina Turner
424	1965			"Before Day (Big Mama's Blues)" b/w "Me and My Chauffeur"	Big Mama Thornton
431	Nov 1965		11	"Black Nights" b/w "Little Angel"	Lowell Fulson
456	Dec 1966	52	5	"Tramp" b/w "Pico"	Lowell Fulson
462	Feb 1967	94	17	"The Jungle" b/w "Long Gone Baby"	B.B. King
463	Mar 1967	91	20	"Make a Little Love" b/w "I'm Sinking"	Lowell Fulson
474	Aug 1967	97	38	"I'm A Drifter" b/w "Hobo Meetin'"	Lowell Fulson
501	Dec 1968			"Merry Christmas Baby" b/w "3 O'Clock Blues"	Charles Brown
506	Feb 1969		29	"Country Girl" b/w "Bye Bye Baby (Until We Meet Again)"	The Johnny Otis Show
512	May 1969			"Love Ain't Nothin'" b/w "10 - 20 - 25 - 30"	Big Joe Turner
4514	Jul 1970			"Please, Please, Please - Pt. 1" b/w "Please, Please, Please - Pt. 2"	Ike & Tina Turner
4520	1970			"You Must Live It" b/w "Are You Ready"	Merryweather
4522	Apr 1970			"Shop Around" b/w "Lucille"	Momma And Pappa Rock'n Family (with Neil Merryweather)
4538	Jan 1971			"The Hunter" b/w "Long Handled Shovel"	Pacific Gas & Electric
4547	May 1971	86	30	"I Need Someone (To Love Me)" b/w "Oh Darling"	Z.Z. Hill

== See also ==
- List of record labels
- Kent Records artists
