= Oliver Sain =

American saxophonist and songwriter (1932–2003)

- Born: Oliver Sain Jr. March 1, 1932; Dundee, Mississippi, U.S.
- Died: October 28, 2003 (aged 71) St Louis, Missouri, U.S.
- Genres: R&B, blues, disco, jazz
- Occupations: Saxophonist, bandleader, songwriter, record producer
- Years active: 1949–2003
- Formerly of: Kings of Rhythm

Oliver Sain Jr. (March 1, 1932 – October 28, 2003) was an American saxophonist, songwriter, bandleader, drummer and record producer, who was an important figure in the development of rhythm and blues music, notably in St Louis, Missouri.

== Biography ==
He was born in Dundee, Mississippi, the grandson of Dan Sane, the guitarist in Frank Stokes' Memphis blues act the Beale Street Sheiks. (The spelling discrepancy was the result of a birth certificate error.) He played trumpet and drums as a child. In 1949, he moved to Greenville, Mississippi, to join his stepfather, pianist Willie Love, as a drummer in a band fronted by Sonny Boy Williamson, soon leaving to join Howlin’ Wolf where he acted as a drummer intermittently for the following decade. After returning from the United States Army draft, serving in the Korean War, he returned to Greenville, and took up the saxophone to rejoin Love in Little Milton's backing band.

Sain moved to Chicago in 1955, sometimes sitting in with Howlin' Wolf's band and becoming acquainted with the owners of Chess Records. In 1959, he was invited by Little Milton to join him for club engagements in East St Louis, and over time became Little Milton's musical director, as well as performing occasionally with Ike Turner's Kings of Rhythm. He recruited Fontella Bass as the Little Milton band's keyboard player, only later discovering her singing talents.

After a few years, Sain left Little Milton's band and installed Fontella Bass and Bobby McClure as co-lead singers in his Oliver Sain Soul Revue. The band made its first recordings in 1964, and the following year Sain wrote and produced Bass and McClure's number 5 R&B chart hit, "Don't Mess Up a Good Thing" recorded at the Chess studios in Chicago and released on the subsidiary Checker label. The song was later covered by Gregg Allman of the Allman Brothers Band, on his solo album Laid Back. After Bass left Sain's band for a solo career, she was replaced by Barbara Carr, who continued to sing with Sain until 1972.

He set up his own recording studio, Archway, in St Louis in 1965, and recorded and produced artists such as the Montclairs and Julius Hemphill, developing "a distinctively full, dynamic sound that would come to help define the St. Louis soul aesthetic." He released his first album, Main Man, in 1972, followed by Bus Stop in 1974. The track "Booty Bumpin' (The Double Bump)" from the latter album was issued as a single, and reached number 78 in the R&B chart. "Party Hearty", taken from his 1975 album Blue Max, reached number 16 on the R&B chart, and its flip side, "She's a Disco Queen", bubbled under the Hot 100. Sain's recordings, including "Bus Stop'", also became successful in British clubs (though it did not reach the UK singles chart), as a result of which he toured in the UK. His final R&B chart entry in the US came with "Feel Like Dancin'" in 1977.

Sain released two further albums, So Good (In the Morning) (1981) and Fused Jazz (1983), but increasingly concentrated on his work as a producer as well as live performances. In 1982, he produced Larry Davis' album Funny Stuff, which won a W. C. Handy Award. In 1987, he composed and produced Johnnie Johnson's debut album Blue Hand Johnnie. In 1986 and 1987, Sain toured Europe with former Kings of Rhythm members Clayton Love, Billy Gayles, Stacy Johnson and Robbie Montgomery (one of The Ikettes) as part of the St. Louis Kings of Rhythm. They were officially appointed as ambassadors for the City of St. Louis by Mayor Vincent Schoemehl. Sain continued to perform and to undertake studio work despite being diagnosed with bladder cancer in the mid-1990s, and is credited with discovering local singer Kim Massie.

Sain died on October 28, 2003, from bone cancer, which had metastasized from his bladder.

== Accolades ==
In 2019, Sain was inducted into the St. Louis Classic Rock Hall of Fame.
