= List of songs written by Ike Turner =

American songwriter, musician and bandleader Ike Turner released his first composition, "Rocket 88" in 1951. The single was credited to Jackie Brenston and his Delta Cats, who were actually Ike Turner and his Kings of Rhythm. The single reached number one on the Billboard R&B chart. It is known for the distinction of being considered the first rock and roll song. The song was inducted into the Blues Hall of Fame in 1991, and the Rock and Roll Hall of Fame Singles in 2018.

Between 1951 and 1955, Turner became a talent scout, session musician and production assistant for Sam Philips at Sun Records and the Bihari brothers at Modern Records. Turner, unaware of songwriter's royalties, also wrote new material, which the Bihari brothers copyrighted under their own name. Turner estimated he "wrote 78 hit records for the Biharis."

Turner's 1958 penned tune "Box Top" featured his vocalist Litte Ann who he later renamed Tina Turner. In 1960, Turner signed to Sue Records and formed the Ike & Tina Turner Revue. He wrote most of their early hits including "A Fool In Love," "I Idolize You," and "Poor Fool."

In 1961, Turner wrote the hit "I'm Blue (The Gong-Gong Song)" for the Ikettes which Billboard ranked #63 on their list of 100 Greatest Girl Group Songs of All Time.

Between 1963 and 1964, Turner formed the labels Sputnik, Sonja, Sony, Prann, Teena, and Innis which he released records from various artists he produced and wrote compositions for. Many songs Turner wrote were recorded multiple times by different vocalists in the Ike & Tina Turner Revue. The list below only includes the original version of songs released.

== Songs ==
=== 1950s ===
Song	Year	Label & Catalog No.	Artist(s)	Writer(s)
"Rocket 88"	1951	Chess 1458	Jackie Brenston and his Delta Cats (uncredited)	Jackie Brenstron (uncredited)
"Come Back Where You Belong"	1951	Chess 1458	Jackie Brenston and his Delta Cats (uncredited)	Jackie Brenstron (uncredited)
"Heartbroken and Worried"	1951	Chess 1459	Ike Turner and his Kings of Rhythm	Ike Turner
"I'm Lonesome Baby"	1951	Chess 1459	Ike Turner and his Kings of Rhythm	Ike Turner
"In My Real Gone Rocket"	1951	Chess 1469	Jackie Brenston and his Delta Cats (uncredited)	Jackie Brenstron (uncredited)
"Independent Woman"	1951	Chess 1472	Jackie Brenston and his Delta Cats (uncredited)	Jackie Brenstron (uncredited)
"You're Drivin' Me Insane"	1952	RPM 356	Ike Turner with Ben Burton & His Orchestra	Ike Turner
"Trouble and Heartaches"	1952	RPM 356	Ike Turner with Ben Burton & His Orchestra	Ike Turner
"Everybody's Talking"	1952	Modern 880	Mary Sue (Bonnie Turner)	Ike Turner Marion Louis Lee (Bonnie Turner)
"Love Is A Gamble"	1952	Modern 880	Mary Sue (Bonnie Turner)	Ike Turner Marion Louis Lee (Bonnie Turner)
"My Heart Belongs To You"	1952	RPM 362	Bonnie and Ike Turner with Orchestral Acc.	Ike Turner
"Looking For My Baby"	1952	RPM 362	Bonnie and Ike Turner with Orchestral Acc.	Ike Turner
"Way Down In The Congo"	1953	Sun (unissued)/Charly LP 30103	Bonnie Turner & Raymond Hill	Ike Turner
"Old Brother Jack"	1953	Sun (unissued)/Charly LP 30103	Bonnie Turner & Raymond Hill	Ike Turner
"Love Is A Gamble"	1953	Sun (unissued)/Charly LP 30103	Bonnie Turner & Raymond Hill	Ike Turner
"The Way You Used To Treat Me"	1954	RPM 409	Lover Boy (alias for Ike Turner)	Ike Turner
"Love Is Scarce"	1954	RPM 409	Lover Boy (alias for Ike Turner)	Ike Turner
"Nobody Wants Me"	1954	Crown LP 5367	Lover Boy (alias for Ike Turner)	Ike Turner
"Why Did You Leave Me"	1954	Ace LP CHD 244	Lover Boy (alias for Ike Turner)	Ike Turner
"Nobody Seems To Want Me"	1954	Ace LP CHD 244	Lover Boy (alias for Ike Turner)	Ike Turner
"Night Howler"	1954	Flair 1038	Billy Gale and His Orchestra	Ike Turner
"My Heart In Your Hands"	1954	Flair 1038	Billy Gale and His Orchestra	Ike Turner
"Cuban Get Away (Bayou Rock)"	1954	Flair 1059	Ike Turner & His Orchestra	Ike Turner Joe Josea
"Canton, Mississippi Breakdown"	1954	Kent LP 9901	Elmore James (Ike Turner uncredited)	Elmore James (Ike Turner uncredited)
"Peg Leg Woman"	1955	Vita 123	Willie King with Ike Turner's Band	Ike Turner
"Mistreating Me"	1955	Vita 123	Willie King with Ike Turner's Band	Ike Turner
"Big John"	1955	RPM 448	Richard Berry	Ike Turner
"I'm Tore Up"	1956	Federal 12265	Billy Gale with Ike Turner's Rhythm Rocker's	Ike Turner Ralph bass
"If I Never Had Known You"	1956	Federal 12265	Billy Gale with Ike Turner's Rhythm Rocker's	Ike Turner
"Take Your Fine Frame Home"	1956	Federal 12272	Billy Gale with Ike Turner's Rhythm Rocker's	Ike Turner Leon Golden Ralph Bass
"Do Right Baby"	1956	Federal 12282	Billy Gale with Ike Turner's Kings of Rhythm	Ike Turner
"No Coming Back"	1956	Federal 12282	Billy Gale with Ike Turner's Kings of Rhythm	Ike Turner
"What Can It Be"	1956	Federal 12283	Jackie Brenston with Ike Turner's Kings of Rhythm	Ike Turner
"Just One More Time"	1956	Federal 12287	Billy Gale with Ike Turner's Kings of Rhythm	Ike Turner Ralph Bass
"Sad As A Man Can Be"	1956	Federal 12287	Billy Gale with Ike Turner's Kings of Rhythm	Ike Turner
"Much Later"	1956	Federal 12291	Jackie Brenston with Ike Turner's Kings of Rhythm	Ike Turner
"The Mistreater"	1956	Federal 12291	Jackie Brenston with Ike Turner's Kings of Rhythm	Ike Turner
"Do You Mean It"	1957	Federal 12297	Ike Turner & His Orchestra	Ike Turner
"She Made My Blood Run Cold"	1957	Federal 12297	Ike Turner & His Orchestra	Ike Turner
"The Big Question"	1957	Federal 12304	Ike Turner & His Orchestra	Ike Turner
"Rock-A-Bucket"	1957	Federal 12304	Ike Turner & His Orchestra	Ike Turner
"You've Changed My Love"	1957	Federal 12307	Ike Turner & His Orchestra	Ike Turner
"Trail Blazer"	1957	Federal 12307	Ike Turner & His Orchestra	Ike Turner
"Boxtop"	1958	Tune Town 501	Ike Turner, Carlson Oliver & Little Ann (Tina Turner)	Ike Turner
"Chalypso Love Cry"	1958	Tune Town 501	Ike Turner Orchestra	Ike Turner
"This Is The End"	1959	Artistic 1503	Buddy Guy and his Band	Ike Turner
"(I Know) You Don't Love Me"	1959	Artistic 1504	Ike Turner's Kings Of Rhythm	Ike Turner
"Down And Out"	1959	Artistic 1504	Ike Turner's Kings Of Rhythm	Ike Turner
"Walking Down The Aisle"	1959	Cobra 5033	Ike Turner's Kings Of Rhythm	Ike Turner
"Box Top"	1959	Cobra 5033	Ike Turner's Kings Of Rhythm	Ike Turner
"Jack Rabbit"	1959	Stevens 104	Icky Renrut (alias for Ike Turner)	Icky Renrut (alias for Ike Turner)
"In Your Eyes Baby"	1959	Stevens 104	Icky Renrut (alias for Ike Turner)	Icky Renrut (alias for Ike Turner)
"Hey-Hey"	1959	Stevens 107	Icky Renrut (alias for Ike Turner)	Icky Renrut (alias for Ike Turner)
"Ho-Ho"	1959	Stevens 107	Icky Renrut (alias for Ike Turner)	Icky Renrut (alias for Ike Turner)
"My Love"	1959	Sue 722	Ike Turner's Kings Of Rhythm	Ike Turner
"That's All I Need"	1959	Sue 722	Ike Turner's Kings Of Rhythm	Ike Turner

=== 1960s ===
Song	Year	Label & Catalog No.	Artist(s)	Writer(s)
"A Fool In Love"	1960	Sue 730	Ike & Tina Turner	Ike Turner
"The Way You Love Me"	1960	Sue 730	Ike & Tina Turner	Ike Turner
"A Fol Too Long"	1960	Sue 734	Ike & Tina Turner	Ike Turner
"You're My Baby"	1960	Sue 734	Ike & Tina Turner	Ike Turner
"I Idolize You"	1960	Sue 735	Ike & Tina Turner	Ike Turner
"Letter From Tina"	1960	Sue 735	Ike & Tina Turner	Ike Turner
"Trouble Up The Road"	1960	Sue 736	Jackie Brenston with Ike Turner Orchestra	Ike Turner
"You Ain't The One"	1960	Sue 736	Jackie Brenston with Ike Turner Orchestra	Ike Turner
"I'm Jealous"	1961	Sue 740	Ike & Tina Turner	Ike Turner Jane Bussong
"My Man Rockhead"	1961	Sue 742	Elosie Carter	Ike Turner
"I Need You"	1961	Sue 742	Elosie Carter	Ike Turner
"I Can't Believe"	1961	Sue 743	Jimmy & Jean with Ike Turner Orchestra	Ike Turner
"I Want To Marry You"	1961	Sue 743	Jimmy & Jean with Ike Turner Orchestra	Ike Turner
"If"	1961	Sue LP 2001	Ike & Tina Turnes	Ike Turner
"You Can't Love Two"	1961	Sue LP 2001	Ike & Tina Turnes	Ike Turner
"Sleepless"	1961	Sue LP 2001	Ike & Tina Turnes	Ike Turner
"Chances Are"	1961	Sue LP 2001	Ike & Tina Turnes	Ike Turner
"The Way You Love Me "	1961	Sue LP 2001	Ike & Tina Turnes	Ike Turner
"Won't You Forgive Me"	1961	Sue 749	Ike & Tina Turnes	Ike Turner
"Poor Fool"	1961	Sue 753	Ike & Tina Turnes	Ike Turner
"You Can't Blame Me"	1961	Sue 753	Ike & Tina Turnes	Ike Turner
"I'm Blue (The Gong-Gong Song)"	1961	Atco 6212	The Ikettes	Ike Turner
"Find My Baby"	1961	Atco 6212	The Ikettes	Ike Turner
"He Gave Me Everything"	1962	Willow 45-23004	Mickey & Sylvia	Ike Turner
"Tra La La La La"	1962	Sue 757	Ike & Tina Turner	Ike Turner
"Puppy Love"	1962	Sue 757	Ike & Tina Turner	Ike Turner
"Prancing"	1962	Sue 760	Ike & Tina Turner's Kings of Rhythm	Ike Turner
"The Gulley"	1962	Sue LP 2003	Ike & Tina Turner's Kings of Rhythm	Ike Turner
"Twistaroo"	1962	Sue LP 2003	Ike & Tina Turner's Kings of Rhythm	Ike Turner
"Trackdown Twist"	1962	Sue LP 2003	Ike & Tina Turner's Kings of Rhythm	Ike Turner
"Potato Mash"	1962	Sue LP 2003	Ike & Tina Turner's Kings of Rhythm	Ike Turner
"Doublemint"	1962	Sue LP 2003	Ike & Tina Turner's Kings of Rhythm	Ike Turner
"The Rooster"	1962	Sue LP 2003	Ike & Tina Turner's Kings of Rhythm	Ike Turner
"Katanga "	1962	Sue LP 2003	Ike & Tina Turner's Kings of Rhythm	Ike Turner
"The Groove"	1962	Sue LP 2003	Ike & Tina Turner's Kings of Rhythm	Ike Turner
"Going Home"	1962	Sue LP 2003	Ike & Tina Turner's Kings of Rhythm	Ike Turner
"Give Me Your Love"	1962	Bobbin 132	Delores Johnson	Ike Turner
"Gotta Find My Baby"	1962	Bobbin 132	Delores Johnson	Ike Turner
"Troubles On My Mind"	1962	Atco 45-6223	The Ikettes	Ike Turner
"Come On And Truck"	1962	Atco 45-6223	The Ikettes	Ike Turner
"You Should'a Treated Me Right"	1962	Sue 765	Ike & Tina Turner	Ike Turner
"Heavenly Love"	1962	Atco 45-6232	The Ikettes	Ike Turner
"Zizzy Zee Zum Zum"	1962	Atco 45-6232	The Ikettes	Ike Turner
"Tina's Dilemma"	1962	Sue 768	Ike & Tina Turner	Ike Turner
"The Argument"	1962	Sue 772	Ike & Tina Turner	Ike Turner
"Mind In A Whirl"	1962	Sue 772	Ike & Tina Turner	Ike Turner
"I Had A Dream The Other Night"	1962	Atco 45-6243	The Ikettes	Ike Turner
"I Do Love You"	1962	Atco 45-6243	The Ikettes	Ike Turner
"Worried And Hurtin' Inside"	1962	Sue 774	Ike & Tina Turner	Ike Turner
"Please Don't Hurt Me"	1962	Sue 774	Ike & Tina Turner	Ike Turner
"You Can Go"	1962	Sue 778	Jimmy Thomas	Miller, Williams, Yount, Turner
"Hurry And Come Home"	1962	Sue 778	Jimmy Thomas	Ike Turner
"I Made A Promise Up Above "	1963	Sue LP 2005	Ike & Tina Turner	Ike Turner
"Desire"	1963	Sue LP 2005	Ike & Tina Turner	Ike Turner
"Those Ways"	1963	Sue LP 2005	Ike & Tina Turner	Ike Turner
"Mama Tell Him"	1963	Sue LP 2005	Ike & Tina Turner	Ike Turner
"Pretend"	1963	Sue LP 2005	Ike & Tina Turner	Ike Turner
"Forever Mine"	1963	Sue LP 2005	Ike & Tina Turner	Ike Turner
"No Amending"	1963	Sue LP 2005	Ike & Tina Turner	Ike Turner
"Love Letters"	1963	Sue LP 2005	Ike & Tina Turner	Ike Turner
"My Everything To Me"	1963	Sue LP 2005	Ike & Tina Turner	Ike Turner
"Wake Up"	1963	Sue 784	Ike & Tina Turner	Ike Turner
"Don't Play Me Cheap"	1963	Sue 784	Ike & Tina Turner	Ike Turner
"The Bad Man"	1963	Sony 111	Bobby John	Ike Turner
"I'm Leaving You"	1963	Sony 112	Venetta Fields	Ike Turner
"Remove My Doubts"	1963	Sony 113	Stacy Johnson	Ike Turner
"Don't Believe 'Em"	1963	Sony 113	Stacy Johnson	Ike Turner
"What's That You've Got"	1963	Sony 114	Ernest Lane	Ike Turner
"Need My Help"	1963	Sony 114	Ernest Lane	Ike Turner
"Crazy In Love"	1963	Teena 1701	Robbie Montgomery and The Ike-Ettes	Ike Turner
"Pee Wee"	1963	Teena 1701	Robbie Montgomery and The Ike-Ettes	Ike Turner
"Prisoner In Love"	1963	Teena 1702	The Ikettes	Ike Turner
"Those Words"	1963	Teena 1702	The Ikettes	Ike Turner
"You've Got Me (Just Where You Want Me)"	1963	Teena 1703	Vernon Guy	Ike Turner
"They Ain't Lovin' Ya"	1963	Teena 1703	Vernon Guy	Ike Turner
"The Darkest Hour"	1963	Sputnik 10001	Jimmy Thomas	Ike Turner
"The Little Cheater"	1963	Sputnik 10001	Jimmy Thomas	Ike Turner
"Gonna Find Me A Substitute"	1963	Sue LP 2007	Ike & Tina Turner	Ike Turner
"Mojo Queen"	1963	Sue LP 2007	Ike & Tina Turner	Ike Turner
"Kinda Strange"	1963	Sue LP 2007	Ike & Tina Turner	Ike Turner
"Why Should I"	1963	Sue LP 2007	Ike & Tina Turner	Ike Turner
"Tinaroo"	1963	Sue LP 2007	Ike & Tina Turner	Ike Turner
"I’m Gonna Cut You Loose"	1963	Sue LP 2007	Ike & Tina Turner	Ike Turner
"I’m Fallin In Love"	1963	Sue LP 2007	Ike & Tina Turner	Ike Turner
"Foolish"	1963	Sue LP 2007	Ike & Tina Turner	Ike Turner
"This Man’s Crazy"	1963	Sue LP 2007	Ike & Tina Turner	Ike Turner
"Love Me Or Leave Me"	1963	Teena 1704	Flora Williams	Ike Turner
"I'll Wait For You"	1963	Teena 1704	Flora Williams	Ike Turner
"If I Can't Be First"	1963	Sonja 2001	Ike & Tina Turner	Ike Turner
"I'm Going Back Home"	1963	Sonja 2001	Ike & Tina Turner	Ike Turner
"Cott'n-Pick'n"	1963	Prann 5002	The Turnabouts	Ike Turner
"Gettin 'away"	1963	Prann 5002	The Turnabouts	Ike Turner
"Spilled Tears"	1963	Prann 5004	Jerry Wilson	Ike Turner
"Doin 'The Thing"	1963	Prann 5004	Jerry Wilson	Ike Turner
"The Hunter And The Rabbit"	1963	Sonja 2002	Vernon & Stacy	Ike Turner
"My Life Time Love"	1963	Sonja 2002	Vernon & Stacy	Ike Turner
"Blue With A Broken Heart"	1963	Sonja 2003	Flora Williams	Ike Turner
"I Love Nobody But You"	1964	Sonja 2004	Jimmy Thomas with Ike & Tina Revue	Ike Turner
"No Puedes Extrañar"	1964	Innis 3001	Gloria Garcia with Ike & Tina Revue	Ike Turner
"You Can't Have Your Cake And Eat It Too"	1964	Innis 3002	Ike & Dee Dee Johnson	Ike Turner
"You Can't Miss Nothing That You Never Had"	1964	Sonja 2005	Ike & Tina Turner	Ike Turner
"God Gave Me You"	1964	Sonja 2005	Ike & Tina Turner	Ike Turner
"Anything - To Make It With You"	1964	Sonja 2007	Vernon Guy	Ike Turner
"Too Many Ties That Bind"	1964	Sonja 5000	Tina Turner	Ike Turner
"We Need An Understanding"	1964	Sonja 5000	Tina Turner	Ike Turner
"Getting Nasty"	1964	Sonja 5001	Nasty Minds (alias for Ike Turner & The Kings of Rhythm	Ike Turner
"Nutting up"	1964	Sonja 5001	Nasty Minds (alias for Ike Turner & The Kings of Rhythm	Ike Turner
"A Fool For A Fool"	1964	Warner Bros. 5433	Ike & Tina Turner	Ike Turner
"It's All Over"	1964	Warner Bros. 5461	Ike & Tina Turner	Ike Turner
"Finger Poppin"	1964	Warner Bros. 5461	Ike & Tina Turner	Ike Turner
"I Can't Believe What You Say (For Seeing What You Do)"	1964	Kent 45x402	Ike & Tina Turner	Ike Turner
"My Baby Now"	1964	Kent 45x402	Ike & Tina Turner	Ike Turner
"Am I A Fool In Love"	1964	Kent K 409X45	Ike & Tina Turner	Ike Turner
"Chicken Shack"	1964	Kent K 409X45	Ike & Tina Turner	Ike Turner
"Camel Walk"	1964	Modern 1002	The Ikettes	Ike Turner
"Nobody Loves Me"	1964	Modern 1002	The Ikettes	Ike Turner
"You're A Jive Playboy"	1964	Sonja 5002	Ike & Tina Turner	Ike Turner
"Don't Believe Him"	1964	Modern 1001	Stacy Johnson	Ike Turner
"Peaches "N" Cream"	1965	Modern 45x1005	The Ikettes	Ike Turner Steve Venet
"The Biggest Players'	1965	Modern 45x1005	The Ikettes	Ike Turner
"I'm Thru With Love"	1965	Loma 2011	Ike & Tina Turner	Ike Turner
"(I'll Do Anything) Just To Be With You"	1965	Loma 2015	Ike & Tina Turner	Ike Turner
"I Know You Don't Love Me"	1965	Royal American 105	Ike Turner	Ike Turner
"I'm On Your Trail"	1965	Royal American 105	Ike Turner	Ike Turner
"How Come"	1965	Modern 45x1008	The Ikettes	Ike Turner
"Good Bye, So Long"	1965	Modern 45x1007	Ike & Tina Turner	Ike Turner
"Hurt Is All You Gave Me"	1965	Modern 45x1007	Ike & Tina Turner	Ike Turner
"I Don't Need"	1965	Modern 45x1012	Ike & Tina Turner	Ike Turner
"Gonna Have Fun"	1965	Modern 45x1012	Ike & Tina Turner	Ike Turner
"Two Is A Couple"	1965	Sue 45-135	Ike & Tina Turner	Ike Turner
"Tin Top House"	1965	Sue 45-135	Ike & Tina Turner	Ike Turner
"The New Breed PT. 1"	1965	Sue 138	Ike Turner and his Kings of Rhythm	Ike Turner
"The New Breed PT. 2"	1965	Sue 138	Ike Turner and his Kings of Rhythm	Ike Turner
"Can't Chance A Break Up"	1965	Sue 139	Ike & Tina Turner	Ike Turner
"Stagger Lee And Billy"	1965	Sue 139	Ike & Tina Turner	Ike Turner
"(Never More) Lonely For You"	1966	Modern 45xM 1015	The Ikettes	Ike Turner
"Anything You Wasn't Born With"	1966	Tangerine 45-TRC-963	Ike & Tina Turner	Ike Turner Tina Turner
"Beauty Is Just Skin Deep"	1966	Tangerine 45-TRC-963	Ike & Tina Turner	Ike Turner Tina Turner
"Dust My Broom"	1966	Tangerine 45-TRC-967	Ike & Tina Turner	Ike Turner Tina Turner
"I'm Hooked"	1966	Tangerine 45-TRC-967	Ike & Tina Turner	Ike Turner Tina Turner
"Not That I Recall"	1966	Modern 45xM 1024	The Ikettes	Ike Turner
"What'cha Gonna Do (When I Leave You"	1966	Phi-Dan 5009	The Ikettes	Ike Turner
"Down, Down"	1966	Phi-Dan 5009	The Ikettes	Ike Turner
"Such A Fool For You"	1966	London SHU 8298	Ike & Tina Turner	Ike Turner
"Make 'Em Wait"	1966	London SHU 8298	Ike & Tina Turner	Ike Turner
"Dear John"	1966	Sue 146	Ike & Tina Turner	Ike Turner
"I Made A Promise Up Above"	1966	Sue 146	Ike & Tina Turner	Ike Turner
"Don't Lie To Me (You Know I Know)"	1966	Innis 6666	Ike & Tina Turner	Ike Turner
"Five Long Years"	c. 1966	Cenco LP 104	Ike & Tina Turner	Ike Turner
"Get It - Get It"	1967	Cenco 112	Ike & Tina Turner	Ike Turner
"You Weren't Ready (For My Love)"	1967	Cenco 112	Ike & Tina Turner	Ike Turner
"I Better Get Ta' Steppen"	1967	Innis 6668	Ike & Tina Turner	Ike Turner Charles Harris
"I Wish My Dream Would Come True"	1967	Kent K 45X457	Ike & Tina Turner	Ike Turner
"Flee Flee Fla'	1967	Kent K 45X457	Ike & Tina Turner	Ike Turner
"So Blue Over You"	1968	Pompeii 45-6667	Ike & Tina and The Ikettes	Ike Turner
"We Need An Understanding"	1968	Pompeii 45-6675	Ike & Tina Turner	Ike Turner Johnny Northern
"Mean Old World "	1969	Blue Thumb LP BTS5	Ike & Tina Turner	Ike Turner
"Grumbling"	1969	Blue Thumb BLU 101	Ike & Tina Turner	Ike Turner
"Thinking Black"	1969	Pompeii SD-6003	Ike Turner & The Kings of Rhythm	Ike Turner
"Black Beauty"	1969	Pompeii SD-6003	Ike Turner & The Kings of Rhythm	Ike Turner
"Ghetto Funk"	1969	Pompeii SD-6003	Ike Turner & The Kings of Rhythm	Ike Turner
"Scotty Souling"	1969	Pompeii SD-6003	Ike Turner & The Kings of Rhythm	Ike Turner
"Freedom Sound"	1969	Pompeii SD-6003	Ike Turner & The Kings of Rhythm	Ike Turner
"Bold Soul Sister"	1969	Blue Thumb BLU 104	Ike & Tina Turner	Ike Turner
"I Wanna Jump"	1969	Minit 32077	Ike & Tina Turner	Ike Turner
"Treating Us (Women) Funky"	1969	Minit 32077	Ike & Tina Turner	Ike Turner
"Shuffle"	1969	Blue Thumb BTS 12	Earl Hooker	Bob Krasnow Earl Hooker Ike Turner
"Catfish Blues"	1969	Blue Thumb BTS 12	Earl Hooker	Bob Krasnow Earl Hooker Ike Turner
"Boogie, Don't Blot!"	1969	Blue Thumb BTS 12	Earl Hooker	Bob Krasnow Ike Turner
"The Mood"	1969	Blue Thumb BTS 12	Earl Hooker	Earl Hooker Ike Turner
"Funky Blues"	1969	Blue Thumb BTS 12	Earl Hooker	Ike Turner

=== 1970s ===
Song	Year	Label & Catalog No.	Artist(s)	Writer(s)
"Contact High"	1970	Liberty 56177	Ike & Tina Turner and The Ikettes	Ike Turner
"It Ain't Right (Lovin' To Be Lovin')"	1970	Liberty LST-7637	Ike & Tina Turner and The Ikettes	Ike Turner
"Unlucky Creature"	1970	Liberty LST-7637	Ike & Tina Turner and The Ikettes	Ike Turner
"Young And Dumb"	1970	Liberty LST-7637	Ike & Tina Turner and The Ikettes	Ike Turner
"Keep On Walking (Don't Look Back)"	1970	Liberty LST-7637	Ike & Tina Turner and The Ikettes	Ike Turner
"Why Can’t We Be Happy"	1970	Liberty LST-7637	Ike & Tina Turner and The Ikettes	Ike Turner
"Doin' It"	1970	Liberty LST-7637	Ike & Tina Turner and The Ikettes	Ike Turner
"Workin' Together"	1970	Liberty 56207	Ike & Tina Turner	Eki Renrut (alias for Ike Turner)
"The Way You Love Me"	1970	Liberty 56207	Ike & Tina Turner	Ike Turner
"You Can Have It"	1970	Liberty LST-7650	Ike & Tina Turner	Ike Turner
"Game Of Love"	1970	Liberty LST-7650	Ike & Tina Turner	Eki Renrut (alias for Ike Turner)
"Soul To Soul"	1971	Atlantic PR-A-167	Ike & Tina Turner	Jackie Clark Ike Turner Anna Bullock
"Sweet Flustrations"	1971	United Artists UAS 5530	Ike & Tina Turner	Leon Ware Ike Turner Philip Reese
"What You Don’t See (Is Better Yet)"	1971	United Artists UAS 5530	Ike & Tina Turner	Ike Turner Tina Turner Leon Ware Calvin Lane
"Nuff Said"	1971	United Artists UAS 5530	Ike & Tina Turner	Calvin Lane Philip Reese Ike Turner
"Nuff Said (Part 2)"	1971	United Artists UAS 5530	Ike & Tina Turner	Calvin Lane Philip Reese Ike Turner
"Tell The Truth"	1971	United Artists UAS 5530	Ike & Tina Turner	Leon Ware Ike Turner
"Can’t You Hear Me Callin'"	1971	United Artists UAS 5530	Ike & Tina Turner	Leon Ware Ike Turner
"Pick Me Up (Take Me Where Your Home Is)"	1971	United Artists UAS 5530	Ike & Tina Turner	Leon Ware Ike Turner Tina Turner Alline Bullock
"Moving Into Hip Style (A Trip Child)"	1971	United Artists UAS 5530	Ike & Tina Turner	Ike Turner Tina Turner Leon Ware
"I Love Baby"	1971	United Artists UAS 5530	Ike & Tina Turner	Ike Turner Calvin Lane Philip Reese
"Na Na"	1971	United Artists 50865	Ike Turner	Ike Turner
"Right On"	1972	United Artists 50900	Ike Turner	Ike Turner
"Tacks In My Shoes"	1972	United Artists 50900	Ike Turner	Ike Turner
"Think"	1972	United Artists UAS 5576	Ike Turner	Ike Turner
"If You Love Me Like You Say"	1972	United Artists UAS 5576	Ike Turner	Ike Turner
"Don't Believe Her"	1973	United Artists UAS 5660	Ike & Tina Turner	Ike Turner
"These Dreams"	1973	United Artists UA LA087-F	Ike Turner	Ike Turner
"That’s How Much I Love You"	1973	United Artists UA LA087-F	Ike Turner	Ike Turner
"One Nite Stand"	1973	United Artists UA LA087-F	Ike Turner	Ike Turner
"Don't Hold Your Breath"	1973	United Artists UA LA087-F	Ike Turner	Ike Turner
"(You Can't Have) The City"	1973	United Artists UA LA087-F	Ike Turner	Ike Turner
"Flockin' With You"	1973	United Artists UA LA087-F	Ike Turner	Ike Turner
"Take A Walk With Me "	1973	United Artists UA LA087-F	Ike Turner	Ike Turner
"You Won't Let Me Go"	1973	United Artists UA LA087-F	Ike Turner	Ike Turner
"Later For You Baby"	1973	United Artists UA LA087-F	Ike Turner	Ike Turner
"Rats"	1973	United Artists UA LA087-F	Ike Turner	Ike Turner
"I Love The Way You Love"	1973	United Artists UA LA087-F	Ike Turner	Ike Turner
"Make Me Over"	1973	United Artists UA LA180-F	Ike & Tina Turner	Ike Turner
"Get It Out Of Your Mind "	1973	United Artists UA LA180-F	Ike & Tina Turner	Ike Turner
"Baby, Get It On"	1975	United Artists UA-LA495-G	Tina Turner	Ike Turner
"Bootsey Whitelaw"	1975	United Artists UA-LA495-G	Tina Turner	Ike Turner
"Pick Me Tonight"	1975	United Artists UA-LA495-G	Tina Turner	Ike Turner
"Rockin' And Rollin'"	1975	United Artists UA-LA495-G	Tina Turner	Ike Turner
"Just Want Your Love Sometime "	1978	United Artists UA-LA917-H	Ike & Tina Turner	Ike Turner
"It’s My Time Now"	1978	United Artists UA-LA917-H	Ike & Tina Turner	Ike Turner

=== 1980s ===
Song	Year	Label & Catalog No.	Album	Artist(s)	Writer(s)
"Party Vibes"	1980	Fantasy F-9597	The Edge	Ike Turner featuring Tina Turner and Home Grown Funk	Ike Turner
"Lum Dum"	1980	Fantasy F-9597	The Edge	Ike Turner featuring Tina Turner and Home Grown Funk	Ike Turner
"No Other Woman"	1980	Fantasy F-9597	The Edge	Ike Turner featuring Tina Turner and Home Grown Funk	Ike Turner
"I Can't Believe"	1980	Fantasy F-9597	The Edge	Ike Turner featuring Tina Turner and Home Grown Funk	Ike Turner
"I Don't Want Nobody"	1980	Fantasy F-9597	The Edge	Ike Turner featuring Tina Turner and Home Grown Funk	Ike Turner
"Golden Empire"	1985	Striped Horse PRi 5005	Golden Empire	Ike & Tina Turner	Ike Turner
"I'm Looking For My Mind"	1985	Striped Horse PRi 5005	Golden Empire	Ike & Tina Turner	Ike Turner
"Too Much Man For One Woman"	1985	Striped Horse PRi 5005	Golden Empire	Ike & Tina Turner	Ike Turner
"Push"	1985	Striped Horse PRi 5005	Golden Empire	Ike & Tina Turner	Ike Turner
"Tina's Prayer"	1985	Striped Horse PRi 5005	Golden Empire	Ike & Tina Turner	Ike Turner
"Chicken"	1985	Striped Horse PRi 5005	Golden Empire	Ike & Tina Turner	Ike Turner
"If You Want It"	1985	Striped Horse PRi 5005	Golden Empire	Ike & Tina Turner	Ike Turner
"Let's Get It On"	1985	Striped Horse PRi 5005	Golden Empire	Ike & Tina Turner	Ike Turner
"You're Up To Something"	1985	Striped Horse PRi 5005	Golden Empire	Ike & Tina Turner	Ike Turner
"Jesus"	1985	Striped Horse PRi 5005	Golden Empire	Ike & Tina Turner	Ike Turner

=== 2000s ===
Song	Year	Label & Catalog No.	Album	Artist(s)	Writer(s)
"Tore Up"	2001	Ikon Records CBHCD2005	Here And Now	Ike Turner & The Kings Of Rhythm	Ike Turner & The Kings Of Rhythm
"Baby's Got It"	2001	Ikon Records CBHCD2005	Here And Now	Ike Turner & The Kings Of Rhythm	Ike Turner & The Kings Of Rhythm
"You Can't Winnum' All"	2001	Ikon Records CBHCD2005	Here And Now	Ike Turner & The Kings Of Rhythm	Ike Turner & The Kings Of Rhythm
"Ike's Theme"	2001	Ikon Records CBHCD2005	Here And Now	Ike Turner & The Kings Of Rhythm	Ike Turner & The Kings Of Rhythm
"Catfish Blues"	2001	Ikon Records CBHCD2005	Here And Now	Ike Turner & The Kings Of Rhythm	Ike Turner & The Kings Of Rhythm
"Gave You What You Wanted"	2001	Ikon Records CBHCD2005	Here And Now	Ike Turner & The Kings Of Rhythm	Ike Turner & The Kings Of Rhythm
"I Need A-Nuddin'"	2001	Ikon Records CBHCD2005	Here And Now	Ike Turner & The Kings Of Rhythm	Ike Turner & The Kings Of Rhythm
"Swanee River Boogie"	2001	Ikon Records CBHCD2005	Here And Now	Ike Turner & The Kings Of Rhythm	Ike Turner & The Kings Of Rhythm
"Feelin' Low Down"	2001	Ikon Records CBHCD2005	Here And Now	Ike Turner & The Kings Of Rhythm	Ike Turner & The Kings Of Rhythm
"Cold Day In Hell"	2001	Ikon Records CBHCD2005	Here And Now	Ike Turner & The Kings Of Rhythm	Ike Turner & The Kings Of Rhythm
"I'll Be Anyway You Want Me To Be"	2004	Funky Delicacies DEL CD 0045	His Woman, Her Man	Ike & Tina Turner	Ike Turner
"Can't Find My Mind"	2004	Funky Delicacies DEL CD 0045	His Woman, Her Man	Ike & Tina Turner	Ike Turner
"He Makes Me Holler"	2004	Funky Delicacies DEL CD 0045	His Woman, Her Man	Ike & Tina Turner	Ike Turner
"It's Groovier Across The Line"	2004	Funky Delicacies DEL CD 0045	His Woman, Her Man	Ike & Tina Turner	Chip Taylor Ted Daryll Ike Turner
"Brain Game"	2004	Funky Delicacies DEL CD 0045	His Woman, Her Man	Ike & Tina Turner	Ike Turner
"I Woke Up This Morning"	2004	Funky Delicacies DEL CD 0045	His Woman, Her Man	Ike & Tina Turner	Ike Turner
"Baby Makes Me Feel Good"	2004	Funky Delicacies DEL CD 0045	His Woman, Her Man	Ike & Tina Turner	Ike Turner
"He's Mine"	2004	Funky Delicacies DEL CD 0045	His Woman, Her Man	Ike & Tina Turner	Ike Turner
"You Ain't Enough For Two"	2004	Funky Delicacies DEL CD 0045	His Woman, Her Man	Ike & Tina Turner	Ike Turner
"Don't Believe Nothing"	2004	Funky Delicacies DEL CD 0045	His Woman, Her Man	Ike & Tina Turner	Ike Turner
"Gimme Back My Wig"	2006	Zoho Roots ZM 200611	Risin' With The Blues	Ike Turner	Ike Turner
"Tease Me"	2006	Zoho Roots ZM 200611	Risin' With The Blues	Ike Turner	Ike Turner
"Jazzy Fuzzy"	2006	Zoho Roots ZM 200611	Risin' With The Blues	Ike Turner	Ike Turner Lenny Rankins
"Jesus Loves Me"	2006	Zoho Roots ZM 200611	Risin' With The Blues	Ike Turner	Ike Turner
"Rockin' Blues"	2006	Zoho Roots ZM 200611	Risin' With The Blues	Ike Turner	Ike Turner
"Big Fat Mama"	2006	Zoho Roots ZM 200611	Risin' With The Blues	Ike Turner	Ike Turner
"Bi Polar"	2006	Zoho Roots ZM 200611	Risin' With The Blues	Ike Turner	Ike Turner
