= (G)Old & New =

- Linda Shuford-Williams, Debbie Wilson, and Linda Sims pictured on the cover

Studio album by The Ikettes
- Released: January 1974
- Recorded: June 1973
- Studio: Bolic Sound (Inglewood, California)
- Genre: R&B, soul, funk rock
- Label: United Artists
- Producer: Ike & Tina Turner and Jackie Clark for I&TT Productions Inc.

The Ikettes chronology
Come Together (1970)	(G)Old & New (1974)	Nice 'N' Rough: The Later Greater Hits of Ike & Tina & The Ikettes (1984)

(G)Old & New is a studio album by American girl group the Ikettes, released on United Artists in 1974. The Ikettes were backing vocalists for the Ike & Tina Turner Revue. (G)Old & New is their second and final studio album, containing new songs and different version of previously released tracks such as their hit "I'm Blue (The Gong-Gong Song)" which featured Tina Turner singing background vocals.

== Recording and release ==
(G)Old & New was recorded at Ike & Tina Turner's studio, Bolic Sound, in June 1973. The album was made due to popular demand, via requests to United Artists for an Ikettes album. The album features new compositions and new versions of old songs. The first hit single by the Ikettes "I'm Blue (The Gong-Gong Song)," was released in 1961. It reached No. 19 on the Billboard Hot 100 and No. 3 on the R&B chart. They released two more charting singles in 1965, "Peaches 'N' Cream" (Pop No. 36, R&B No. 28) and "I'm So Thankful" (Pop No. 74, R&B No. 12).

For the album, the Ikettes recorded two songs by the Supremes, soul/funk infused renditions of "Someday We'll Be Together" and "Come See About Me." There are also high energy funk rock covers of Billy Preston's "Will It Go Round In Circles" and the Doobie Brothers' "Listen to the Music." As well as songs by Joe Tex and The Crystals.

At the time of the album's release in January 1974, the Ikettes composed of Charlotte Lewis, Linda Sims, and Debbie Wilson. However, Linda Shuford-Williams is pictured on the cover instead of Lewis.

== Critical reception ==
Professional ratings
Review scores
Source	Rating
Allmusic	4/5 stars

Reviewing the album, Cash Box noted that "each cut has the fresh, bouncy rhythm that become an Ikette trademark, especially 'Listen To The Music,' 'Camel Walk,' and 'Peaches and Cream.'"

Billboard (January 26, 1974): "Returning to the recording spotlight after a trio of big 1962-65 hits, the Ikettes deliver a strong uptempo soul collection for their first album as UA's first female group. Lots of characteristic Ikette energy, in a set of oldies combined with new material."

Reviewing (G)Old & New for AllMusic, Andrew Hamilton wrote:

With more push, the Ikettes would be mentioned with the greatest female vocal groups. Their lineup changed constantly, but talent always replaced talent, and they never lost their assertive, attacking sound. "Peaches & Cream," an explosive slab of pop/soul, is aggressive and gritty. "Camel Walk" has a rolling beat and exudes soul; its chorus includes a sexy, funky count from one to 11. The easy, rhythmic "I'm So Thankful" reigns as their most relaxed hit, it's similar to the Supremes' "Where Did Our Love Go."

== Track listing ==
Side A
No.	Title	Writer(s)	Length
1.	"Someday We'll Be Together"	Johnny Bristol, Jackey Beavers, Harvey Fuqua	3:11
2.	"Will It Go Round In Circles"	Billy Preston, Bruce Fisher	3:28
3.	"Listen To The Music"	Tom Johnston	2:58
4.	"I Gotcha"	Joe Tex	3:13
5.	"Peaches 'N' Cream"	Steve Venet, Tommy Boyce	2:30

Side B
No.	Title	Writer(s)	Length
1.	"Come See About Me"	Holland-Dozier-Holland	2:54
2.	"Da Doo Ron Ron"	Phil Spector, Jeff Barry, Ellie Greenwich	2:32
3.	"Camel Walk"	Ike Turner	2:26
4.	"I'm So Thankful"	Frank Wilson, Marc Gordon	2:55
5.	"I'm Blue"	Ike Turner	3:48
