= Carlena Williams =

American vocalist

- Also known as: Carlena Weaver; Carlene Williams
- Born: Flora Williams; February 25, 1942
- Origin: Buffalo, New York, U.S.
- Died: November 13, 2013 (aged 71)
- Occupation: Singer
- Labels: Teena; Sonja; Audel; Venice; Broadcast
- Formerly of: The Ikettes; The Blackberries

Carlena Williams (February 25, 1942 – November 13, 2013) was an American vocalist. Early in her career, she recorded under her name, Flora Williams, as an Ikette in the Ike & Tina Turner Revue. In the 1960s she released a few singles as Carlena Weaver. She later toured with rock group Pink Floyd as a backing vocalist. Williams sang with various artists, including The Carpenters, Bonnie Raitt, Van Morrison, Etta James, David Gilmour, and Humble Pie. Williams was a member of Sunshine, Donna Summer's backing vocal group in the 1970s.

== Life and career ==
Born on February 25, 1942, Flora Williams spent her childhood in North Carolina. She began singing in church at the age of 13, and during high school she sang in the vocal group called the Delvettes. After graduation she relocated to Buffalo, New York. In Buffalo, she sang at the nightclub the Shalimar Club where she opened for headliners.

Williams sang in the Corinthian Gospel Singers with Venetta Fields who became an Ikette in the Ike & Tina Turner Revue. Williams joined the revue in the early 1960s. She released a few singles written and produced by Ike Turner on his labels Teena Records and Sonja Records.

After her tenure as an Ikette, she returned to Buffalo, and later toured with the Avengers which included two other vocalists Hank Mullen and Moe Jones. She released a single under the name Carlena Weaver on the homegrown Audel label in 1967. Some time after, she released another single on Mo Do Records, owned by William Nunn (father of R&B singer Bobby Nunn).

Williams paired up with Venetta Fields as The Blackberries, which had been the name of a group Fields formed with singer Clydie King. In 1973, they were working with Humble Pie when Pink Floyd guitarist David Gilmour convinced them to sing with Pink Floyd. Fields sang on their Dark Side of the Moon Tour and Williams was on their 1974 French Summer Tour. Williams and Fields also provided vocals for Pink Floyd's album Wish You Were Here (1975).

In 1975, Williams released a solo single on Venice Records. Through the latter part of the decade she sang backing vocals for various artists, including Roy Buchanan, The Carpenters, Bonnie Raitt, Van Morrison, and Donna Summer. She also contributed vocals to David Gilmour's first solo album David Gilmour (1978). In 1984, she recorded for Broadcast Records located in North Carolina.

Williams released her self-published autobiography, A Promise Is A Promise, in 2006. She died on November 13, 2013.

== Discography ==
=== Singles ===
==== Flora Williams ====
- 1963: "Love Me Or Leave Me" / "I'll Wait For You" (Teena 1704)
- 1963: "Blue With A Broken Heart "/ "Mind In A Whirl" (Sonja 2003)

==== Carlena Weaver ====
- 1967: "Jealousy" / "Heart Break" (Audel 363)
- 1968/1969: "Smile A Rainbow" / "Happy Mood" (Mo Do 105)

==== Carlena Williams ====
- 1975: "Hey Radio" / "I Won't Be Completely Happy" (Venice 001)
- 1984: "(When I'm) Touching You" / "When You're Near" (Broadcast 10705)

=== Album appearances ===
- 1992: The Ikettes – Fine Fine Fine (Kent Records)
- 2007: The Ikettes – Can't Sit Down... 'Cos It Feels So Good: The Complete Modern Recordings (Kent Soul)
- 2007: The Ikettes – Soul The Hits (Modern Records)
- 2012: A Woman Needs A Man To Love: Lady Soul 1965-1991 (P-Vine Records)

=== Backing vocal credits ===
- 1974: Etta James – Come A Little Closer
- 1974: Humble Pie – Thunderbox
- 1974: Roy Buchanan – In The Beginning
- 1974: Richard "Dimples" Fields – Spoiled Rotten!
- 1974: Love – Reel-To-Real
- 1975: Country Joe McDonald – Paradise With An Ocean View
- 1975: Pink Floyd – Wish You Were Here
- 1975: The Righteous Brothers – The Sons Of Mrs. Righteous
- 1976: Steve Marriott – Marriott
- 1976: Dianne Brooks – Back Stairs Of My Life
- 1977: Donna Summer – Once Upon A Time
- 1977: Bonnie Raitt – Sweet Forgiveness
- 1977: Van Morrison – A Period Of Transition
- 1977: The Carpenters – Passage
- 1978: David Gilmour – David Gilmour
- 1978: Paul Jabara – Keeping Time
- 1978: Donna Summer – Live And More
- 1979: Brooklyn Dreams – Sleepless Nights

== Books ==
- 2006: A Promise Is A Promise (ISBN 978-1425908768)
