= The Mirettes =

Vocal trio

- Origin: Los Angeles, California, U.S.
- Genres: Soul, R&B
- Occupation: girl group
- Years active: 1966–1971
- Labels: Mirwood Records; Revue Records; Uni Records; Minit Records; Zea Records
- Past members: Robbie Montgomery; Venetta Fields; Jessie Smith; Pat Powdrill

The Mirettes were a female vocal trio composed of former members of the Ikettes in the Ike & Tina Turner Revue.

== History ==
Robbie Montgomery, Venetta Fields and Jessie Smith were the first official incarnation of the Ikettes, a backing trio for Ike & Tina Turner. In 1965, the Ikettes had a top 40 pop hit with "Peaches 'N' Cream" and a top 20 R&B hit with "I'm So Thankful" on Modern Records. As their popularity grew, Ike Turner sent a different set of Ikettes on the road with "The Dick Clark Caravan of Stars" and kept Montgomery, Smith, and Fields on tour with his revue which caused much annoyance to the trio. They also were not receiving the extra money from their hits, so they left the revue in late 1965.

After trying unsuccessfully to continue using the name the Ikettes under management of Tina Turner's sister, Alline Bullock, they signed to Mirwood Records and changed their name to the Mirettes in 1966. After their two singles on the label did not chart, they signed to Revue Records where they had some success. Their first single, "In the Midnight Hour" reached No. 45 on the Billboard Hot 100 and No. 18 on the R&B chart. Their next two singles made little impression, as did a single on Minit Records in 1968 entitled "Help Wanted." In June 1968, they performed at the Soul-In show held by the Chicago chapter of the National Association of Television and Radio Announcers (NATRA).

A transfer to Uni Records in 1969 was more fruitful for them, but the songs were not big hits. That same year they sang on The Lost Man soundtrack produced by Quincy Jones. In 1970, they signed to the independent label, Zea Records, and released "Ain't My Stuff Good Enough". Venetta Fields left the group and was replaced by former Ikette Pat Powdrill before they broke up in 1971.

== Discography ==
=== Studio albums ===
Title	Details
In The Midnight Hour	Released: 1968 Label: Revue Records Catalog Number: RS – 7205
Whirlpool	Released: 1969 Label: Uni Records Catalog Number: 73062

=== Vocal credits ===
- 1969: The Lost Man (The Original Soundtrack Album)

=== Other appearances ===
- 1970: A Little Shot Of Rhythm & Blues (Rhapsody Records)
- 2006: The Mirwood Soul Story Volume 2 (Kent dance)
- 2010: Northern Soul Of Revue (Soul World)
- 2016: Quincy Jones – The Cinema Of Quincy Jones (Decca Records)
- 2017: Mirwood Northern Soul (Kent Dance)

=== Singles ===
Single (A-side, B-side)	Release date	Label & Cat #	Peak chart position		Album
Single (A-side, B-side)	Release date	Label & Cat #	US Hot 100	US R&B	Album
"He's All Right With Me" b/w "Your Kind Ain't No Good"	Apr 1966	Mirwood – 5514	—	—	Non-album tracks
"Now That I Found You, Baby" b/w "He's All Right With Me"	Mar 1967	Mirwood – 5531	—	—	Non-album tracks
"In The Midnight Hour" b/w "To Love Somebody"	Nov 1967	Revue – 11004	45	18	In The Midnight Hour
"Help Wanted" b/w "John's Big Chance" by Huggy's Ork	May 1968	Minit – 32045	—	—	Non-album track
"The Real Thing" b/w "Take Me For A Little While"	May 1968	Revue – 11017	—	—	In The Midnight Hour
"I'm A Whole New Thing" b/w "First Love"	Nov 1968	Revue – 11029	—	—	In The Midnight Hour
"Stand By Your Man" b/w "If Everybody'd Help Somebody"	Feb 1969	Uni – 55110	—	—	Whirlpool
"Heart Full Of Gladness" b/w "Ain't You Trying To Cross Over"	Apr 1969	Uni – 55126	—	—	Whirlpool
"Whirlpool" b/w "Ain't You Trying To Cross Over"	Jul 1969	Uni – 55147	—	—	Whirlpool
"Sweet Soul Sister" b/w "Rap, Run It Down"	Sep 1969	Uni – 55161	—	—	The Lost Man
"Ain't My Stuff Good Enough" b/w "The Time And The Season"	1970	Zea – ZEA 50002	—	—	Non-album tracks
"—" denotes a recording that did not chart.
