= Vera Hamilton =

- Also known as: Vera Hamilton-Clyburn
- Born: July 17, 1945; Eatonton, Georgia, U.S.
- Died: August 31, 2013 (aged 68); Long Beach, California, U.S.
- Genres: Soul; R&B
- Occupation: Singer
- Labels: Epic
- Formerly of: The Ikettes; Ike & Tina Turner; Johnny Otis

Vera Hamilton (July 17, 1945 – August 31, 2013) was an American soul singer. Best known as an Ikette in The Ike & Tina Turner Revue, she also performed as an Otisette with Johnny Otis and recorded as a solo artist.

== Life and career ==
Hamilton was born in Eatonton, Georgia on July 17, 1945. She was an Ikette during Ike & Tina Turner's commercial peak in the early 1970s. As an Ikette, Hamilton appeared on various television shows such as The Tonight Show Starring Johnny Carson, The Andy Williams Show, and Beat-Club. They were featured in the Isley Brothers concert film It's Your Thing (1970) and had a cameo in the Miloš Forman film Taking Off (1971). The revue toured internationally and performed at the Independence Day concert in Accra, Ghana, which was released as the documentary film Soul to Soul (1971).

In 1972, Hamilton released a single on Epic Records produced by Johnny Otis. She also sang as an Otisette with The Johnny Otis Show. Hamilton performed maintained a sisterhood with Alesia Butler and Teresa Butler. When Ike Turner formed a new revue in the 1990s, Hamilton rejoined him to perform as a lead vocalist.

Hamilton died in Long Beach, California on August 31, 2013.

== Discography ==
=== Singles ===
- 1972: "But I Ain't No More (G.S.T.S.K.D.T.S.)" / "Heavy, Heavy Hangs (Over My Heart)" (Epic 5-10875)

=== Album appearances ===
- 2000: Various – I'm A Good Woman (Funk Classics From Sassy Soul Sisters) (Harmless)
- 2000: Various – A Fusion Soul Classics Collection (Universal Music)
- 2001: Johnny Otis & Friends – Watts Funky (BGP Records)
- 2003: Various – Funk Soul Sisters (BGP Records)

=== Backing vocal credits ===
- 1971: Ike & Tina Turner – What You Hear Is What You Get (Live at Carnegie Hall) (United Artists)
- 1971: Ike & Tina Turner – Live in Paris (Olympia 1971) (United Artists)
- 1976: Bo Diddley – Where It All Began (Bellaphon)
- 1981: Johnny Otis and Shuggie Otis – The New Johnny Otis Show with Shuggie Otis (Alligator)
