= Where It All Began =

Where It All Began may refer to:

- Where It All Began (Bo Diddley album), 1972
- Where It All Began (Matthew Morrison album)
- Where It All Began (Dan + Shay album)
