= Esther Jones (singer) =

American singer (1945–2006)

- Jones in 1969

Background information
- Birth name: Esther Faye Bills
- Also known as: Ester Jones; Esther Burton; Ester Bills
- Born: February 2, 1945; El Paso, Texas, U.S.
- Died: December 8, 2006 (aged 61); Midland, Texas, U.S.
- Genres: Soul, R&B, funk
- Occupation(s): Singer choreographer

Esther Faye Bills (February 2, 1945 – December 8, 2006) was an American soul singer and choreographer, best known as the "longest-lasting Ikette" in the Ike & Tina Turner Revue. In the 1980s, she was the lead vocalist in the band Formula 5.

== Life and career ==
Jones was born on February 2, 1945, in El Paso, Texas, to Luchie and Carrie Bills. Growing up in Midland, she sang in church, played percussion and won competitions as a twirler. After she graduated from Carver High School in 1964, she joined a group called the B-29ers and Arty Tolliver as a vocalist.

In 1968, Jones auditioned to become an Ikette and was hired on the spot. While most Ikettes did not last long, Jones was one of the constant members until the end of the Ike & Tina Turner Revue in 1976. At one point, she had briefly quit when Ike Turner fined her $15 for being late onstage. Due to her experience and leadership, Jones trained the other Ikettes and was referred to as "Motha" Ikette. During her tenure as an Ikette she was responsible for most of the choreography. Tina Turner described her as "the hardest worker and toughest dancer". As an Ikette with Ike & Tina Turner, Jones opened for the Rolling Stones on their 1969 American tour. They were featured in the Isley Brothers concert film It's Your Thing (1970) and had a cameo in the Miloš Forman film Taking Off (1971). The revue toured the world and performed at the Independence Day concert in Accra, Ghana, which was released as the film Soul to Soul (1971). They also appeared on various television shows such as The Hollywood Palace, The Ed Sullivan Show, The Andy Williams Show, and Soul Train.

While she was an Ikette, Jones lived in Los Angeles with her husband, while their three children lived in Texas with her grandparents.

In 1983, Jones released the single "Love Hour" with drummer-singer Tony Davis as Tony & Davis. Jones fronted the soul funk band Formula 5 in the 1980s. She released two albums, Determination (1985) and On The Rise (1986), with the band on Malaco Records. In 1985, Jones performed at the San Francisco Blues Festival.

Jones moved back to Midland, Texas, shortly after she had a stroke in 1992. She also suffered from multiple myeloma. At the age of 60, she became a member of the West Texas Aphasia Center, which helps stroke victims learn to communicate. On December 8, 2006, Jones died at the age of 61 at the Hospice of Midland. She was survived by her sons Blake Burton and Robert Bills.

== Discography ==
Jones was credited as both Ester Jones and Esther Jones.

=== Singles ===
==== Tony and Esther ====
- 1983: "Love Hour" (Tyshawn TS 7777)

==== Formula 5 ====
- 1985: "Cleaning House" (Malaco MAL 1218)
- 1985: "Part Time Lover, Full Time Fool" (Malaco MAL 2114)

=== Albums ===
==== Ike and Tina Turner ====
- 1971: What You Hear Is What You Get - Live at Carnegie Hall
- 1971: Live in Paris – Olympia 1971

==== Formula 5 ====
- 1985: Determination (Malaco Records)
- 1986: On The Rise (Malaco Records)

=== Backing vocal credits ===
- 1972: Gayle McCormick – Flesh & Blood (Decca Records)
