= Basin Street West =

Basin Street West was a nightclub owned by Jack Yanoff in San Francisco located in the North Beach neighborhood at on 401 Broadway. It opened as a Jazz club in 1964, then integrated soul and rock acts before its closure in 1973.

== History ==
Jack Yanoff opened the Basin Street West as a jazz club in 1964. The first performers were Latin jazz pianist Eddie Cano and pianist Hampton Hawes. Comedians also performed at the club. The only surviving video footage of Lenny Bruce performing in a nightclub was recorded at Basin Street West in August 1965.

By 1967, Yanoff was booking rock acts like Jefferson Airplane. Soul acts such as Otis Redding and Smokey Robinson & The Miracles also performed at the club. R&B duo Ike & Tina Turner recorded a live album there in 1969.

After Basin Street West closed in 1973, it was replaced by a Korean restaurant.

== Notable performers ==
- The Miles Davis Quintet
- Dizzy Gillespie
- Jefferson Airplane
- The Ike & Tina Turner
- Otis Redding
- Little Richard
- Smokey Robinson & The Miracles
- Rudy Ray Moore
- Martha Reeves & The Vandellas
- Ray Charles
- The Fifth Dimension
- Four Tops
- Sam & Dave
- Buddy Rich
- El Chicano
- Joe Simon
- Lenny Bruce
- Sly Stone
- Mongo Santamaria
- Armando Peraza
- Kenny Rogers and the First Edition

== Live albums ==
- 1964: Essential O'Day – Anita O'Day
- 1966: Woody's Winners – Woody Herman
- 1967: Woody Live: East and West – Woody Herman and His Swingin' Herd
- 1967: Dancing In the Street – Ramsey Lewis
- 1969: In Person – Ike & Tina Turner & The Ikettes
- 1971: Tears of Joy – Don Ellis
- 1971: For All We Know – Charlie Byrd

== See also ==
- Basin Street East
