= The Ikettes =

American backing vocalists for the Ike & Tina Turner Revue

- The Ikettes in 1968. Left to right: Ann Thomas, Paulette Parker, Pat Powdrill, Jean Brown.

Background information
- Genres: R&B, soul, pop
- Occupations: Backing vocalists, girl group
- Years active: 1960–1976; 1988–2000s
- Labels: Atco; Teena; Sony; Sonja; Innis; Phi-Dan; Modern; Pompeii; Liberty; United Artists
- Past members: Robbie Montgomery; Eloise Hester; Jo Armstead; Jessie Smith; Venetta Fields; Pat Arnold (a.k.a. P.P. Arnold); Juanita Hixson; Gloria Scott; Maxine Smith; Pat Powdrill; Ann Thomas; Rose Smith; Shelly Clark; Paulette Parker (a.k.a. Maxayn Lewis); Ester Jones; Claudia Lennear; Edna Richardson; Stonye Figueroa; Linda Shuford-Williams; Alesia Butler; Yolanda Goodwin; Jeanette Bazzell Turner; Randi Love (a.k.a. Michelle Love); Audrey Madison Turner; See members section for others

The Ikettes were a female backing vocal group for R&B duo Ike & Tina Turner, performing primarily as a trio, though occasionally expanding to a quartet. The group originated in 1960 when Ike Turner recruited members of Art Lassiter's backing trio, the Artettes—Robbie Montgomery, Frances Hodges, and Sandra Hardin—to record "A Fool in Love" with Tina Turner after Lassiter failed to appear for a scheduled session. Following the success of the single, Turner formed the Ike & Tina Turner Revue and assembled a new backing group, soon known as the Ikettes.

Although initially conceived as support vocalists, the Ikettes achieved success as recording artists in their own right, scoring hits in the 1960s such as "I'm Blue (The Gong-Gong Song)" and "Peaches 'N' Cream". In 2017, Billboard ranked "I'm Blue (The Gong-Gong Song)" No. 63 on its list of 100 Greatest Girl Group Songs of All Time.

The group's lineup changed frequently over the years, with notable members including Joshie "Jo" Armstead, Pat "P. P." Arnold, Shelly Clark, Paulette Parker (Maxayn Lewis), Claudia Lennear, Pat Powdrill, Ester Jones, Venetta Fields, Lejeune "Edna" Richardson, and Marcy Thomas (Lyrica Garrett). One of the most recognized later lineups featured Robbie Montgomery, Venetta Fields, and Jessie Smith, who subsequently formed the Mirettes.

The Ikettes became known for their dynamic stage presence, characterized by coordinated dance routines, minidresses, and a high-energy performance style that complemented Tina Turner's lead vocals.

== History ==
When R&B singer Art Lassiter failed to appear for a recording session in early 1960, bandleader Ike Turner enlisted his backing group, the Artettes—Robbie Montgomery, Frances Hodges, and Sandra Harding—to record "A Fool in Love" with his vocalist Little Ann (later Tina Turner). Following the single's success, Turner formed the Ike & Tina Turner Revue and assembled a new backing trio: Delores Johnson, Eloise Hester, and Jo Armstead, as Montgomery was pregnant and unable to tour. The group recorded "I'm Blue (The Gong-Gong Song)" in 1961, which was released on Atco Records, and reached No. 3 on the Billboard R&B chart and No. 19 on the Hot 100.

Montgomery later returned and, with Jessie Smith—recruited from Benny Sharp and the Zorros of Rhythm—and Venetta Fields, a gospel singer from Buffalo, New York, formed the first official incarnation of the Ikettes. The revue toured extensively on the Chitlin' Circuit in the segregated South, with occasional performances at major venues such as the Apollo Theater in New York, Howard Theater in Washington, D.C., and Uptown Theater in Philadelphia.

In 1962, Turner moved the group to his Teena label, releasing "Crazy in Love" and "Prisoner in Love" (later retitled "No Bail in This Jail" to avoid confusion with a song by James Brown). During this period, singer Bonnie Bramlett briefly joined as the first white Ikette. Bramlett recalled that she was an Ikette for three days when she was 17. She put on a dark wig to cover her blonde hair and used Man Tan to darken her skin.

In 1964, the Ikettes released "Here's Your Heart" on Innis Records and "What'cha Gonna Do (When I Leave You)" on Phi-Dan Records in 1966, though neither achieved national success. Between 1964 and 1966, they issued several singles on Modern Records, including "The Camel Walk" (1964) and the hits "Peaches 'N' Cream" (1965) and "I'm So Thankful"(1965). As "Peaches 'N' Cream" gained popularity, Ike Turner sent a separate lineup—Janice Singleton, Diane Rutherford, and Marquentta Tinsley—on tour with the Dick Clark Caravan of Stars, while Robbie Montgomery, Jessie Smith, and Venetta Fields remained with the revue. The trio later left to form the Mirettes, prompting Turner to recruit new Ikettes, including Pat Arnold, Gloria Scott, and Maxine Smith. The group's first album, Soul the Hits, was released in 1966. That same year, Tina Turner recorded the Phil Spector-produced single "River Deep – Mountain High," on which the Blossoms, rather than the Ikettes, provided backing vocals. Following the song's success in Europe, Ike & Tina Turner were invited to tour with the Rolling Stones during their British tour. The Ikettes on that tour were Rose Smith, Pat Arnold, and Ann Thomas. In late 1966, Shelly Clark was an Ikette until she was injured in a bus accident involving the revue in Wichita, Kansas. During this period, the Ikettes' lineup shifted frequently, with members including Pat Powdrill, Jean Brown, Paulette Parker, and Juanita Hixson in 1967.

In 1968, the single "So Fine," released on Pompeii Records and credited to Ike & Tina Turner & the Ikettes, reached No. 50 on the R&B chart. A new lineup featuring Edna Richardson, Claudia Lennear, and Ester Jones emerged that year. Subsequent releases on Minit Records and its parent label Liberty Records in 1969–1970 included covers such as "Come Together" by the Beatles and "I Want to Take You Higher" by Sly & the Family Stone. The group continued touring the country, including the Rolling Stones' American tour in 1969. The Ikettes on that tour were Pat Powdrill, Ester Jones, Claudia Lennear. The Ikettes gained further exposure on television appearances on programs such as Playboy After Dark, The Ed Sullivan Show, The Andy Williams Show, and The Tonight Show Starring Johnny Carson.

In 1971, Liberty Records was absorbed into United Artists Records, and the Ikettes released their first single for the label,"Got What It Takes (To Get What I Want)." Their final known single, "Two Timin', Double Dealin'" followed in 1972. That year, the Ikettes appeared on Soul Train in April 1972 and also provided backing vocals on Gayle McCormick's album Flesh & Blood (1972). In October, Tina Turner and the Ikettes performed at the Star-Spangled Women for McGovern–Shriver concert at Madison Square Garden.

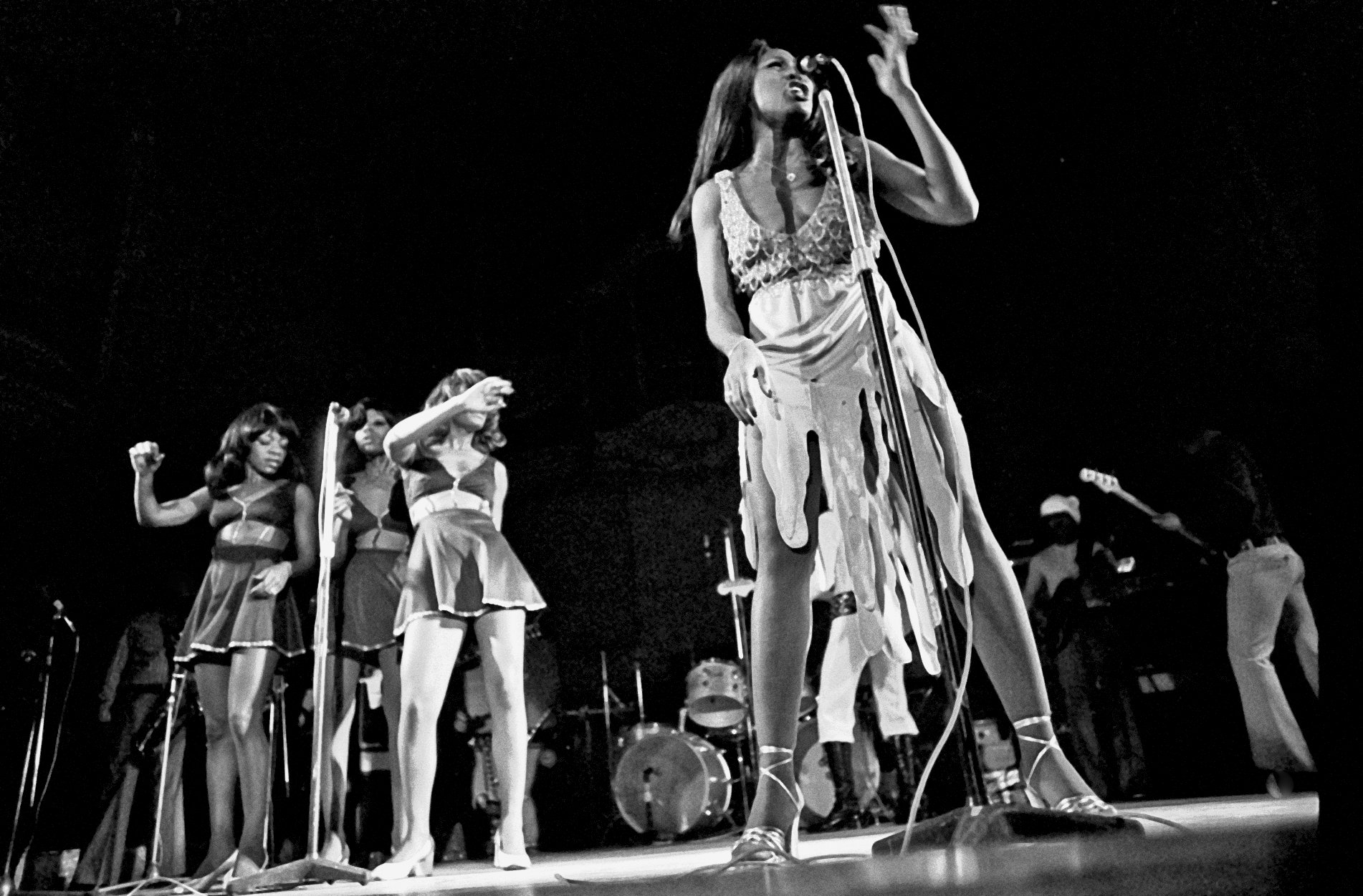
Tina Turner and the Ikettes (Ester Jones, Gail Stevens, and Edna LeJeune Richardson) performing in Hamburg, 1972

Lineup changes continued into 1973, including the temporary departure of Ester Jones. Despite frequent turnover, Jones—nicknamed "Motha" Ikette—was the group's longest-serving member and played a key role as rehearsal leader and choreographer. That year, various lineups appeared on television and international programs, including The Midnight Special and Hits à Gogo. Members Linda Sims and Debbie Wilson, along with Tina Turner, also contributed backing vocals to Frank Zappa's albums Over-Nite Sensation (1973) and Apostrophe (') (1974), recorded at the Turners' Bolic Sound studio in Inglewood.

The Ikettes became known for their tightly synchronized choreography and distinctive stage style. Tina Turner emphasized their visual presentation, stating in Esquire: "They represent me, and in my act they gotta look outta sight at all times. There's simply no room for sloppiness and unprofessionalism."

The Ikettes’ final album, (G)Old & New, was released in 1974.That year, Edna Richardson, Stonye Figueroa, and Linda Sims appeared on Don Kirshner's Rock Concert. They were soon replaced by Ester Jones, Yolanda Goodwin, and Marcy Thomas, who comprised the group's primary lineup for much of 1974. By 1975, a lineup featuring Edna Richardson, Yolanda Goodwin, and Ester Jones was in place, and they continued performing until the Ike & Tina Turner Revue disbanded in 1976.

In 1988, Ike Turner attempted an ill-fated return to the stage with Marcy Thomas, Bonnie Johnson, and Jeanette Bazzell as his Ikettes. He was arrested on drug charges the following year. After serving 18-months in prison he managed to rehabilitate his cocaine addiction and he revived his career in the 1990s. Turner formed new sets of Ikettes, which included Jeanette Bazzell, Nina Hill, Randi Love, a.k.a. Michelle Love, Stonye Figueroa, Vera Hamilton, and Audrey Madison.

== Post-Ikette careers ==
- Jo Armstead – Pursued a solo career before forming the songwriting/production team Ashford, Simpson & Armstead with Nickolas Ashford and Valerie Simpson.
- P. P. Arnold – Left after the 1966 UK tour with the Rolling Stones; achieved solo success in the UK with hits including "The First Cut Is The Deepest" and "Angel of the Morning."
- Jeanette Bazzell (Turner) – Married to Ike Turner from 1995 to 2000. Continued performing and later worked as a real estate broker.
- Bonnie Bramlett – Co-founded the duo Delaney & Bonnie (1967–1972), known for "Never Ending Song of Love" and "Only You Know and I Know."
- Shelly Clark – Founded member of Honey Cone, which had a No. 1 hit with "Want Ads" (1971). She is married to Earth, Wind & Fire bassist Verdine White.
- Venetta Fields – Founded the Mirettes, and became a prominent backing vocalist as a member of the Blackberries, working with Humble Pie, Pink Floyd, Steely Dan, Barbra Streisand, the Rolling Stones, and appearing in the film A Star Is Born (1976); later continued her career in Australia.
- Ester Jones – Later performed with the band Formula 5; died in 2006 at age 61.
- Claudia Lennear – Released the album Phew! (1973), worked with Joe Cocker and Humble Pie, and later became a teacher; featured in 20 Feet from Stardom (2013).
- Audrey Madison (Turner) – Married to Ike Turner from 2006 to 2007. Appeared on The X Factor (2011) and published the memoir Love Had Everything to Do with It (2016).
- Robbie Montgomery – Sang backing vocals for several artists such as Dr. John, Debbie Reynolds, Joe Cocker, and Stevie Wonder before becoming a restaurateur and star of Welcome to Sweetie Pie's; released an EP in 2018.
- Paulette Parker (Maxayn Lewis) – Formed the band Maxayn and toured with artists such as Donna Summer and Rufus.
- Edna Richardson (née Woods) – Appeared in Truck Turner (1974) and later worked as a dancer for Tina Turner during her solo career under the name LeJeune Richardson.
- Janice Singleton (Hughes) – Formed a trio called the Secrets; later toured and recorded with artists including Joe Cocker, Boz Scaggs, Bobby Womack, and Dionne Warwick.
- Marcy Thomas (Lyrica Garrett) – Continued performing and later appeared on Love & Hip Hop: Hollywood with her daughter Lyrica Anderson.
- Margaret "Ann" Thomas – Had a daughter with Ike Turner in 1969. Returned to the Ike & Tina Turner Revue in a wardrobe role after leaving as a performer. She was later married to Turner from 1981 to 1990.

== Members ==
=== 1960s–1970s ===
- Shirley Alexander, a.k.a. Shirley Butler (1969–70)
- Jo Armstead (1960–c.1962)
- P.P. Arnold (1965–1966)
- Mary Bennett (April–July 1978)
- Bonnie Bramlett (c. 1963–1964), first white member
- Mary "Jean Brown" Standard (1967–1968, 1970–1972; died January 23, 2023)
- Alesia "Sugar" Butler (1973)
- Judy Cheeks (1975)
- Shelly Clark (1966), later a member of Honey Cone
- Venetta Fields (c. 1962–1965)
- Stonye Figueroa, a.k.a. Barbara Cook (1969–70; 1974)
- Yolanda Goodwin (1974–1976)
- Martha Graham (c. 1968)
- Vera Hamilton (1970–1971; died August 31, 2013)
- Eloise Hester a.k.a. Eloise Carter (1960–1962)
- Juanita Hixson (1964–?)
- Frances Hodges (1960)
- Sandra Harding (1960)
- Brenda Holloway
- Patrice Holloway
- Delores "Dee Dee" Johnson (c. 1961–1962)
- Elyana Armstrong (1962)
- Johnnie B. Johnson-Day (early 1960s)
- Ester Jones, a.k.a. Esther Burton & Ester Bills (1968–1976; died in 2006) "longest-lasting Ikette"
- Claudia Lennear, a.k.a. Joy Lennear (1968–1970)
- Charlotte Lewis
- Kathi McDonald (c. 1969)
- Robbie Montgomery (1960–1965)
- Paulette Parker, a.k.a. Maxayn Lewis (c. 1966–1968)
- Pat Powdrill (c. 1967– 1970; died April 11, 1996)
- Vermettya Royster
- Edna "LeJeune" Richardson, a.k.a. Edna Woods (1968–1969; 1971–1976)
- Diane Rutherford-Swann (c. 1964–1966)
- Gloria Scott (c. 1965)
- Linda Shuford-Williams, a.k.a. Linda Jones (1972–1974)
- Linda Sims
- Janice Singleton (1965)
- Jessie Smith (c. 1961–1965)
- Maxine Smith (1965)
- Rose Smith (c. 1966)
- Jackie Stanton
- Gail Stevens (1972)
- The Stovall Sisters (1967)
- (Margaret) Ann Thomas (1966–1968), "non-singing Ikette"
- Marcy Thomas, a.k.a. Lyrica Garrett (1974–1975)
- Marquentta Tinsley (c. 1964–?)
- Adrienne Williams
- Carlena "Flora" Williams (c. 1963–64)
- Debbie Wilson

=== 1980s–2000s ===
- Jeanette Bazzell Turner (1988–2000)
- Bonnie Johnson (1988)
- Marcy Thomas, a.k.a. Lyrica Garrett (1988)
- Vera Hamilton (mid-1990s)
- Stonye Figueroa, a.k.a. Barbara Cook (1998)
- Randi Love, a.k.a. Michelle Love (mid 1990s–early 2000s)
- Audrey Madison Turner (1993–early 2000s)

== Discography ==
=== Albums ===
Title	Album details	Peak chart positions		Notes
Title	Album details	US Top 200	US R&B	Notes
Fine Fine Fine	Released: September 1965; Label: Stateside Records; Catalog Number: SE 1033	—	—	EP released in the UK
Soul The Hits	Released: 1966; Label: Modern Records; Catalog Number: MST 102	—	—	Reissued on CD in 2007
In Person	Released: June 1969; Label: Minit Records; Catalog Number: LP 24018	142	19	Credited to Ike & Tina Turner and The Ikettes; Recorded at Basin Street West in San Francisco
Come Together	Released: May 1970; Label: Liberty Records; Catalog Number: LST-7637	130	13	Credited to Ike & Tina Turner and The Ikettes
(G)Old & New	Released: 1974; Label: United Artists Records; Catalog Number: UA-LA190-F	—	—	
"—" denotes a recording that did not chart.

=== Compilations ===
- 1987: Fine Fine Fine (Kent Records)
- 2007: Can't Sit Down... 'Cos It Feels So Good: The Complete Modern Recordings (Kent Records)

=== Singles ===
The Ikettes had 3 songs chart on the Billboard Hot 100 and 3 songs on the Billboard Hot R&B which include 1 top 10 hit. They have also charted on records with Ike & Tina Turner.

Single (A-side, B-side)	Release date	Label & Cat No.	Peak positions		Album	Notes
Single (A-side, B-side)	Release date	Label & Cat No.	US Hot 100	US R&B	Album	Notes
"I'm Blue (The Gong-Gong Song)" b/w "Find My Baby"	Nov 1961	Atco – 45-6212	19	3	Non-album tracks	No. 63 on Billboard's list of 100 Greatest Girl Group Songs of All Time
"Troubles on My Mind" b/w "Come On and Truck"	Apr 1962	Atco – 45-6223	—	—	Non-album tracks	
"Heavenly Love" b/w "Zizzy Zee Zum Zum"	Jul 1962	Atco – 45-6232	—	—	Non-album tracks	
"I Had a Dream the Other Night" b/w "I Do Love You"	Nov 1962	Atco – 45-6243	—	—	Non-album tracks	
"Crazy in Love" b/w Pee Wee	Feb 1963	Teena – 1701	—	—	Non-album tracks	Credited as Robbie Montgomery and the Ikettes
"No Bail in This Jail (Prisoner In Love)" b/w "Those Words"	Apr 1963	Teena – 1702	126*	—	Non-album tracks	Teena was Ike Turner's label named after Tina Turner
"You're Still My Baby" b/w "I'm Leaving You"	Apr 1963	Sony – 112	—	—	Non-album tracks	Credited to Venetta Fields; Sony was Ike Turner's label
"Blue with a Broken Heart" b/w "Mind In A Whirl"	ca. 1963	Sonja – 2003	—	—	Non-album tracks	Credited to Flora Williams; Sonja was Ike Turner's label
"Here's Your Heart" "Here's Your Heart (Instrumental)"	Jan 1964	Innis – 3000	—	—	Non-album tracks	Innis was Ike Turner's label
"Camel Walk" b/w "Nobody Loves Me"	Dec 1964	Modern – 1003	107*	—	Soul The Hits	
"Peaches 'N' Cream" b/w "The Biggest Players"	Feb 1965	Modern – 45x1005	36	28	Soul The Hits	
"(He's Gonna Be) Fine, Fine, Fine" b/w "How Come"	May 1965	Modern – 45x1008	125*	—	Soul The Hits	
"I'm So Thankful" b/w "Don't Feel Sorry for Me"	Jul 1965	Modern – 45x1011	74	12	Soul The Hits	
"(Never More) Lonely for You" b/w "Sally Go Round the Roses"	Jan 1966	Modern – 45xM 1015	122*	—	Soul The Hits	
"Not That I Recall" b/w "Da Doo Ron Ron"	Jul 1966	Modern – 45xM 1024	—	—	Soul The Hits	
"What'cha Gonna Do (When I Leave You)" b/w "Down, Down"	Aug 1966	Phi-Dan – 5009	—	—	Non-album tracks	Phi-Dan was a subsidiary label of Phil Spector Productions; Pat Arnold (P.P. Arnold) sang lead; Lead vocals by Rose Smith on "Down, Down"
"So Fine" b/w "So Blue Over You"	Mar 1968	Pompeii – 45-6667	117*	50	So Fine	"So Fine" is credited to Ike & Tina Turner and The Ikettes; B-side is on the album Cussin', Cryin' & Carryin' On
"Make 'Em Wait" b/w "Beauty Is Just Skin Deep"	Nov 1968	Pompeii – 45-66683	—	—	Cussin', Cryin' & Carryin' On	Cussin', Cryin' & Carryin' On is an Ike & Tina Turner album; Billboard Review (November 16, 1968)
"Come Together" b/w "Honky Tonk Women"	Jan 1970	Minit – 32087	57	21	Come Together	Credited to Ike & Tina Turner and The Ikettes
"I Want to Take You Higher" b/w "Contact High"	May 1970	Liberty – 56177	34	25	Come Together	Credited to Ike & Tina Turner and The Ikettes
"Got What It Takes (To Get What I Want)" b/w "If You Take A Close Look"	Dec 1971	United Artists – 50866	—	—	Non-album tracks	
"I'm Just Not Ready for Love" b/w "Two Timin' Double Dealin'"	Dec 1972	United Artists – 51103	—	—	Non-album tracks	
*single did not chart on the main chart but was on the Bubbling Under Top LP's. "—" denotes a recording that did not chart.

== Filmography/Selected TV appearances ==
Title	Airdate/Year	Ikettes
Shindig!	April 21, 1965	Robbie Montgomery, Venetta Fields, Jessie Smith
Hollywood A Go-Go	April 24, 1965	Robbie Montgomery, Venetta Fields, Jessie Smith
American Bandstand	May 1, 1965	Robbie Montgomery, Venetta Fields, Jessie Smith
The Big T.N.T. Show	1966 (filmed November 29, 1965)	Pat Arnold (P.P. Arnold), Gloria Scott, and Maxine Smith
Studio Uno	March 26, 1966	Robbie Montgomery, Venetta Fields, Jessie Smith
Goodbye Again	August 18, 1968 (filmed Apr 1968)	Pat Powdrill, Ann Thomas, Jean Brown, Paulette Parker (Maxayn Lewis)
The Hollywood Palace	December 7, 1968	Ester Jones, Edna Richardson, Claudia Lennear
Andy's Love Concert	Marc. 19, 1969	Ester Jones, Edna Richardson, Claudia Lennear
The Smothers Brothers Comedy Hour	April 13, 1969	Ester Jones, Edna Richardson, Claudia Lennear
It's Your Thing	1970	Ester Jones, Jean Brown, Vera Hamilton
Playboy After Dark	February 3, 1970 (filmed December 3, 1969)	Pat Powdrill, Ester Jones, Claudia Lennear
The Ed Sullivan Show	Jan 11. 1970	Claudia Lennear, Ester Jones, Stonye Figueroa
The Tonight Show Starring Johnny Carson	July 9, 1970	Ester Jones, Vera Hamilton, Jean Brown
Johnny Cash Presents the Everly Brothers	August 5, 1970	Ester Jones, Jean Brown, unknown
The Andy Williams Show	September 26, 1970	Ester Jones, Vera Hamilton, Jean Brown
The Tonight Show Starring Johnny Carson	November 25, 1970	Ester Jones, Vera Hamilton, Jean Brown
Taking Off	1971	Ester Jones, Vera Hamilton, Jean Brown
Soul to Soul	1971	Ester Jones, Vera Hamilton, Jean Brown
Beat-Club	February 27, 1971	Ester Jones, Vera Hamilton, Jean Brown
The Pearl Bailey Show	March 27, 1971	Ester Jones, Vera Hamilton, Jean Brown
Good Vibrations from Central Park	Aug, 19, 1971	Ester Jones, Jean Brown, Edna Richardson
Rollin' on the River	February 10, 1972	Ester Jones, Jean Brown, Edna Richardson
Soul Train	April 22, 1972	Ester Jones, Jean Brown, Edna Richardson
The Tonight Show Starring Johnny Carson	May 4, 1972	Ester Jones, Jean Brown, Edna Richardson
The Tonight Show Starring Johnny Carson	October 4, 1972	Ester Jones, Gail Stevens, Edna Richardson
The Dick Cavett Show	October 10, 1972	Ester Jones, Gail Stevens, Edna Richardson
Top à Régine	November 11, 1972	Ester Jones, Gail Stevens, Edna Richardson
The Midnight Special	February 3, 1973	Linda Sims, Linda Shuford-Williams, Alesia Butler
The Burns and Schreiber Comedy Hour	June 22, 1973	Alesia Butler, unknown, unknown
In Concert	August 3, 1973	Linda Sims, Linda Shuford-Williams, Debbie Wilson
The Midnight Special	November 10, 1973	Edna Richardson, Linda Sims, Charlotte Lewis
In Concert	December 14, 1973	Linda Sims, Charlotte Lewis, Debbie Wilson
Hits à Gogo	December 14, 1973	Linda Sims, Charlotte Lewis, Debbie Wilson
The Midnight Special	February 9, 1974	Linda Sims, Charlotte Lewis, Debbie Wilson
Don Kirshner's Rock Concert	March 16, 1974	Linda Sims, Stonye Figueroa, Edna Richardson
Musikladen	November 14, 1974	Ester Jones, Marcy Thomas (Lyrica Garrett), Yolanda Goodwin
Soul Train	January 18, 1975	Ester Jones, Marcy Thomas (Lyrica Garrett), Yolanda Goodwin
The Midnight Special	March 8, 1975	Ester Jones, Marcy Thomas (Lyrica Garrett), Edna Richardson
Cher	April 27, 1975	Ester Jones, Edna Richardson, Yolanda Goodwin
Cher	October 12, 1975	Ester Jones, Edna Richardson, Yolanda Goodwin
Van Dyke and Company	October 30, 1975	Ester Jones, Marcy Thomas (Lyrica Garrett), Edna Richardson
Poiret est à vous	1975	Ester Jones, Edna Richardson, Judy Cheeks
Don Kirshner's Rock Concert	March 12, 1976	Ester Jones, Edna Richardson, Yolanda Goodwin
Ike & Tina on the Road: 1971–72	2012	Ester Jones, Jean Brown, Edna Richardson

== Bibliography ==
- Turner, Tina; Loder, Kurt (1986). I, Tina: My Life Story. Avon Books. ISBN 978-0-380-70097-4.
