= In Person (Ike & Tina Turner album) =

Live album by Ike & Tina Turner and The Ikettes
- Released: June 1969
- Recorded: 1969
- Venue: Basin Street West (San Francisco, CA)
- Genre: Soul
- Label: Minit Records
- Producer: Ike Turner

Ike & Tina Turner chronology
Outta Season (1969)	In Person (1969)	Cussin', Cryin' & Carryin' On (1969)

The Ikettes chronology
Soul the Hits (1966)	In Person (1969)	Come Together (1970)

Singles from In Person
- 1. "Respect" Released: 1970

In Person is a live album by Ike & Tina Turner and their backing vocalists the Ikettes. It was released on Minit Records in 1969.

== Recording and release ==
In Person was recorded at Basin Street West in San Francisco. The album peaked at No. 142 on the Billboard 200 chart and No. 19 on the R&B albums chart. An edited version of "Respect" was released by Liberty Records as a single in France in 1970.

== Critical reception ==
The album received positive reviews. Record World magazine chose the album as a Pick of the Week: "Ike and Tina Turner and the Ikettes 'In Person' is always an electrifying experience and the package at hand proves it."

Professional ratings
Review scores
Source	Rating
Allmusic	2.5/5 stars

Billboard (June 14, 1969):

Currently enjoying a deserved revival on the charts, Ike and Tina Turner, pus the Ikettes and the Kings of Rhythm, team up for a live performance at Basin Street West. Tina Turner's dynamic soul style re-energizes "Everyday People," "Son of a Preacher Man," "Respect," and "Funky Street" as the revue features hit soul tunes and that in-person flavor.

== Track listing ==
Side A
No.	Title	Writer(s)	Length
1.	"Everyday People" (The Ikettes)	Sly Stone	3:14
2.	"Gimme Some Loving"/"Sweet Soul Music" (Medley by Ike & Tina Turner)	Steve Winwood, Muff Winwood, Otis Redding, Arthur Conley, Sam Cooke	2:56
3.	"Son of a Preacher Man" (Ike & Tina Turner)	John Hurley, Ronnie Wilkins	3:00
4.	"I Heard It Through the Grapevine" (Ike & Tina Turner)	Norman Whitfield, Barrett Strong	3:25
5.	"Respect" (Ike & Tina Turner)	Otis Redding	8:31

Side B
No.	Title	Writer(s)	Length
1.	"There Was a Time"/"African Boo's" (Medley by the Ikettes)	James Brown, Buddy Hobgood, Ike Turner	4:07
2.	"Funky Street" (Ike & Tina Turner)	Arthur Conley, Earl Simms	2:13
3.	"A Fool in Love" (The Ikettes)	Ike Turner	3:04
4.	"The Summit"/"All I Could Do Was Cry"/"Please, Please, Please"/"Baby I Love You" (Medley by Ike & Tina Turner)	Ike Turner, Billy Davis, Berry Gordy, Gwen Gordy, James Brown, Johnny Terry, Ronny Shanon	12:22
5.	"Goodbye, So Long" (Ike & Tina Turner)	Ike Turner	3:13

== Charts ==
Chart (1969)	Peak position
US Billboard Top LP's	142
US Billboard Soul LP's	19
US Cash Box Top 100 Albums 101–140	106
US Record World LP's Coming Up	105
