= Pat Powdrill =

- Powdrill c. 1966.

Background information
- Born: January 21, 1948; Birmingham, Alabama, U.S.
- Died: April 11, 1996 (aged 48) Los Angeles, California, U.S.
- Genres: R&B, Soul
- Occupation: Singer-songwriter
- Labels: Reprise, Downey, Forward
- Formerly of: The Ikettes

Pat Powdrill (January 21, 1948 – April 11, 1996) was an American soul singer and songwriter. Powdrill was best known for being a member of the Ikettes in the 1960s. She began her career as a solo artist recording for Reprise Records and Downey Records. She later performed as backing vocalist for various artists.

== Life and career ==
Powdrill was born in Birmingham, Alabama. Her family moved to Los Angeles when she was 8 years old.

At 15 years old, Powdrill signed to Frank Sinatra's Reprise Records in 1963. She was produced by Jimmy Bowen; arranged by Jack Nitzsche and David Gates. In total, there were three singles on the label between 1963 and 1964, but none of them charted. During this period her mother chaperoned her while she opened for Johnny Otis, Esther Phillips, and Dinah Washington in San Francisco.

While still under contract to Reprise, Powdrill met independent record producer Nick Risi through her mother who worked with his father at the same company. She would attend practice sessions of other artists at Record City, owned by Risi's friend Jim Thomas. After her Reprise contract ended, she recorded some masters for Nick Risi and Jim Thomas, resulting in two singles released on Downey Records between 1966 and 1967. Her song "Do It" is popular in the northern soul scene. Her second single on the label, "Together Forever," was co-written by Barry White and released as Pat Powdrill & the Powerdrills. The Powerdrills were session singers that included Pete Parker and Jim Thomas.

Around late 1967, Powdrill became an Ikette in the Ike & Tina Turner Revue. In April 1968, they toured the United Kingdom and they were the opening act for the Rolling Stones on the 1969 American Tour. As an ikette between 1967 and 1970, Powdrill made TV appearances on Goodbye Again and Playboy After Dark. Turner wrote in his autobiography, Takin' Back My Name, that one night while they were gambling during an engagement in Las Vegas, Powdrill left with her winnings and returned to Los Angeles.

In 1969, Powdrill's manager Nick Risi negotiated a deal with Forward Records, a division of Transcontinental Entertainment Corporation. Risi and Bob Summers were reported to be the producers for her Forward session for Sidewalk Productions. However, no records by Powdrill were released on the label, and Risi moved to the UK. She briefly replaced former Ikette Venetta Fields in the Mirettes before the group broke up in the early 1970s.

Through the 1970s and into the 1980s, Powdrill was a backing vocalist. She worked with various artists, including Dr. John, Wilton Felder, Diana Ross, the Brothers Johnson, and Tracy Nelson.

In 1976, Powdrill was an uncredited vocalist on the hit song "Uptown Festival" by Shalamar which was produced by Simon Soussan and recorded at Ike & Tina Turner's Bolic Sound studio. "He told us this was a demo, for his home use. Simon Soussan took the track to Soul Train Records and made a bank. Patty Powdrill got nothing," she said. She co-wrote the song "If It Wasn't For My Baby" on Martha Reeves' 1980 album Gotta Keep Moving.

Powdrill lived in Los Angeles for the remaining years of her life. She died on April 11, 1996.

== Discography ==
=== Singles ===
- 1963: "I Only Came To Dance With You" / "Fell By The Wayside" (Reprise R-20 166)
- 1963: "I Forgot More Than You'll Ever Know" / "Happy Anniversary" (Reprise R-20 204)
- 1964: "Breaking Point" / "Luckiest Girl In Town" (Reprise 0286)
- 1966: "I Can't Hear You" / "Do It" (Downey D-139)
- 1967: "Together Forever" / "They Are The Lonely" (Downey D-141)

=== Album appearances ===
- 2008: Northern Soul's Classiest Rarities 3 (Kent Dance)
- 2011: The Downey Story: Landlocked (Ace Records)
- 2015: Girl Zone! (Ace Records)
- 2019: Would She Do That For You?! Girl Group Sounds USA 1964–68 (Ace Records)

=== Backing vocal credits ===
- 1973: Sharon Cash – Sharon Cash
- 1974: Tracy Nelson – Tracy Nelson
- 1974: Michael Murphey – Michael Murphey
- 1975: El Coco – Brazil
- 1975: El Coco – Mondo Disc
- 1976: El Coco – Let's Get It Together
- 1980: Wilton Felder – Inherit The Wind
