= I'm So Thankful =

1965 song by The Ikettes

Single by The Ikettes

from the album Soul The Hits
- B-side: "Don't Feel Sorry For Me"
- Released: August 1965
- Genre: Soul, Pop
- Length: 2:40
- Label: Modern Records
- Songwriters: Marc Gordon, Frank Wilson

The Ikettes singles chronology
"(He's Gonna Be) Fine, Fine, Fine" (1965)	"I'm So Thankful" (1965)	"(Never More) Lonely For You" (1966)

"I'm So Thankful" is a song written by Marc Gordon and Frank Wilson, and released by The Ikettes on Modern Records in 1965. It was the fourth single from The Ikettes' debut album Soul The Hits, and became their second R&B hit of the year following "Peaches 'N' Cream."

== Critical reception ==
The record was chosen as Cash Box's (August 7, 1965) Pick of the Week:

The Iketters are a cinch to create a tremendous sales-stir with this in both the pop and r&b markets. The top lid here, "I'm So Thankful" a slow-shufflin' romantic ode about a love-sick gal who is on cloud nine since she met the fella of her dreams. Undercut, "Don’t Feel Sorry Me," is a hard-driving blues twister about a jilted lass who claims happy that her romance went kaput.

== Chart performance ==
Chart (1965)	Peak position
US Billboard Hot 100	74
US Billboard R&B Singles	12
US Cash Box Top 100	70
US Cash Box Top 50 R&B	16
US Record World 100 Top Pops	60
US Record World Top 40 R&B	7
