= Come Together (Ike & Tina Turner album) =

Studio album by Ike & Tina Turner and the Ikettes
- Released: April 1970
- Label: Liberty Records
- Producer: Ike Turner

Ike & Tina Turner chronology
Ike & Tina Turner's Festival of Live Performances (1970)	Come Together (1970)	Workin' Together (1970)

The Ikettes chronology
In Person (1969)	Come Together (1970)	(G)Old & New (1974)

Singles from Come Together
- 1. "Come Together" Released: December 1969; 2. "I Want to Take You Higher" Released: May 1970

Come Together is a studio album by Ike & Tina Turner and their backing vocalists the Ikettes, released on Liberty Records in April 1970.

== Content and release ==
The album combines rock and soul elements. Following Ike & Tina Turner's tour with the Rolling Stones in November 1969, the duo began incorporating rock songs into their repertoire. Due to the receptive public response to their live performances, a studio version of the Beatles' "Come Together" was released on Minit Records in December 1969. It peaked at No. 57 on the Billboard Hot 100 and No. 21 on the Billboard Soul Singles chart. Due to the success of the single, they were promoted to Minit's parent label, the more mainstream Liberty Records. Their second single, "I Want to Take You Higher" by Sly and the Family Stone was released in May 1970. It peaked at No. 34 on the Billboard Hot 100 and No. 25 on the Billboard Soul Singles chart.

The track "Evil Man" was originally recorded as "Evil Woman" by the band Crow, more famously remembered for the version Black Sabbath released in January 1970. Ike & Tina Turner's recording is gender-swapped, describing a man rather than a woman.

The album peaked at No. 13 on the Billboard Soul LP's chart and at No. 130 on the Top LP's chart.

== Critical reception ==
Professional ratings
Review scores
Source	Rating
Allmusic	3/5 stars
Christgau's Record Guide	A−
Tom Hull – on the Web	A−

The album received positive reviews.

Cash Box (April 18, 1970):

The powerhouse duo have a particularly solid entry with this rocking package which includes their recent chart single, "Honky Tonk Women." Things really get moving on the Beatles song "Come Together" and the Sly favorite "I Want To Take You Higher." The soulful and sexy voice of Tina is heard to full advantage. A couple of top notch entertainers, Ike and Tina just keep on driving. Watch for this LP on the charts.

The Philadelphia Inquirer (May 3, 1970): "Very rarely does a record generate the kind of excitement you find on the new LP, which as usual, emphasizes the smoldering vocals of Tina Turner, with Ike and the other review members taking their customary roles as slick backdrops for the singer."

== Reissues ==
Come Together was digitally remastered and released by BGO records on the compilation CD Come Together/Nuff Said in 2010.

== Track listing ==
All tracks written by Ike Turner, except where noted.

Side A
No.	Title	Writer(s)	Length
1.	"It Ain't Right (Lovin' to Be Lovin')"		2:34
2.	"Too Much Woman (For a Henpecked Man)"		2:31
3.	"Unlucky Creature"		2:25
4.	"Young and Dumb"		2:50
5.	"Honky Tonk Women"	Mick Jagger, Keith Richards	3:30
6.	"Come Together"	John Lennon, Paul McCartney	3:37

Side B
No.	Title	Writer(s)	Length
1.	"Why Can't We Be Happy"		3:49
2.	"Contact High"		2:16
3.	"Keep On Walkin' (Don't Look Back)"		2:07
4.	"I Want to Take You Higher"	Sylvester Stewart	2:51
5.	"Evil Man"	Larry Weiss	3:25
6.	"Doin' It"		2:41

== Chart performance ==
Chart (1970)	Peak position
US Billboard Top LP's	130
US Billboard Soul LP's	13
US Cash Box Top 100	64
US Record World 100 Top LP's	75
