= I Idolize You =

Single by Ike & Tina Turner

from the album The Soul of Ike & Tina Turner
- B-side: "Letter from Tina"
- Released: November 1960
- Recorded: 1960
- Length: 2:35
- Label: Sue Records
- Songwriter: Ike Turner
- Producer: Ike Turner

Ike & Tina Turner singles chronology
"A Fool Too Long" (1960)	"I Idolize You" (1960)	"I'm Jealous" (1961)

"I Idolize You" is a song written and produced by Ike Turner. It was released by Ike & Tina Turner in 1960 as the second single from their debut album The Soul of Ike & Tina Turner.

== Overview ==
After years with male front-men backing his Kings of Rhythm band, Ike Turner had finally found success after his vocalist Tina Turner recorded "A Fool in Love". The song made Tina Turner a rising R&B star, and Ike Turner had his biggest hit as a songwriter since "Rocket 88" nearly a decade before. After Sue Records signed the act to their label, the duo had a string hits and toured constantly when they weren't recording.

Ike Turner wrote and produced "I Idolize You" which shares some similarities to "A Fool in Love" down from the doo-wop backing vocals by The Ikettes in contrast to Tina's raspy, growling belt to even the piano melody. Released in November 1960, the song was their second hit single. It peaked at No. 5 on the Billboard R&B chart and crossed over to the Billboard Hot 100 at No. 82.

This song would be one of several songs Ike & Tina Turner would re-record over the years. The duo recorded an updated version of "I Idolize You" in 1966 for their album River Deep - Mountain High. It was released as a B-side single on Philles Records in 1967.

== Critical reception ==
The record was selected for Cash Box magazine's Pick of the Week and Billboard's Spotlight Winner of the Week.

Cash Box (November 1, 1960):

Team's follow-up to their big pop-r&b dual-mart'er, "A Fool In Love," can also come thru in winning style. Tune, "I Idolize You," is set to an enticing middle beat rhythm and wailed with conviction by Tina. Ike's ork and vocal group supply the tantalizing background sounds. A slow shuffle rhythm sets the pace for Tina's infectious reading on the lower lid.

Billboard (November 14, 1960):

"Letter From Tina" is a showmanly item featuring a good teen-slanted lyric and strong narration by Tina. Flip spotlights an exuberant thrushing stint by the gal on an emotion-packed tune with catchy Latin tempo. "Letter" has a slight edge.

== Track listing ==
1960
No.	Title	Writer(s)	Length
1.	"I Idolize You"	Ike Turner	2:35
2.	"Letter from Tina"	Ike Turner	2:35

1967
No.	Title	Writer(s)	Length
1.	"A Love Like Yours (Don't Come Knocking Every Day)"	Holland–Dozier–Holland	2:52
2.	"I Idolize You"	Ike Turner	3:30

== Chart performance ==
=== Weekly charts ===
Chart (1960–1961)	Peak position
US Billboard Hot 100	82
US Billboard Hot R&B Sides	5
US Cash Box Top 100	49
US Cash Box Top 50 R&B	4

=== Year-end charts ===
Chart (1961)	Rank
US Cash Box Top 50 R&B Records	48

== Credits ==
- Lead vocal by Tina Turner
- Background vocals by The Ikettes
- Instrumentation by Ike Turner and The Kings of Rhythm
- Written and produced by Ike Turner
