= Revue Records =

Defunct American record label

- Parent company: MCA Records
- Founded: 1967
- Defunct: 1970
- Distributor: Uni Records
- Location: Hollywood, California, U.S.

Revue Records was an American subsidiary record label of MCA. Revue was operated by the same management team that ran Universal City (UNI) Records. Revue was created in 1967 to exclusively cater to the R&B market. The label primarily released singles, but from 1968 until its dissolution, albums were released. In 1971, MCA merged Uni Records and other subsidiaries to become MCA Records.

== Roster ==
The label initially bought master recordings to release, but artist who recorded for the label include:

- Garland Green
- The Mirettes
- Jack Montgomery
- The Chi-Lites
- Marvin L. Sims
- Darrow Fletcher
- Alder Ray
- The Sunlovers
- Lee Charles
- Tony Borders
- Marvin Holmes & The Uptights
- Third Avenue Blues Band
- Mike & The Censations
- David T. Walker
- Eddie & Ernie
- Joyce Hopson
- Charles Lamont

== Discography ==
=== Albums ===
Catalog No.	Released	Title	Artist
RS 7201	1968	House on Elm Street	Harold Johnson Sextet
RS 7202	1968	To Soul with Love	Stu Gardner
RS 7203	1968	Can You Dig It...Live	Ural Thomas
RS 7204	1968	Everybody Loves a Winner	Harold Johnson Sextet
RS 7205	1968	In the Midnight Hour	The Mirettes
RS 7206	1969	Jazz + Soul	Willie Bovain
RS 7207	1969	The Sidewalk	David T. Walker
RS 7208			
RS 7209			
RS 7210	1969	A Midsummer's Day Dream	Mark Eric
RS 7211	1970	Going Up!	David T. Walker
RS 7212	1970	Wide Open	Harold Johnson
RS 7213	1970	Fantastic	3rd Avenue Blues Band
