= Sunshine (American band) =

American female disco band

Sunshine was a disco group and the backing vocalist for singer Donna Summer. The members included Carlena Williams and Summer's sisters Linda Gaines (now Lotman), Dara Bernard, and Mary Ellen Bernard. Their 1978 number one Billboard Disco hit "Take It to the Zoo" charted as "Last Dance / After Dark / Thank God It's Friday / Take It to the Zoo" by Donna Summer. The song was featured on the "Thank God It's Friday" film and soundtrack, was co-written by Summer (with Bruce Sudano and Joe "Bean" Esposito), who also sings background on the track.

The planned album, "Sunshine Watching Daddy Dance", was pulled at the last minute. Mary Ellen Bernard continued to perform with Summer until her sister's death on May 17, 2012. Linda Gaines Lotman, Mary Ellen Bernard, Dara Bernard and Jenette Yancey, sang "We've Come This Far By Faith" at Summer's funeral at Christ Presbyterian Church in Nashville.

Dara Bernard, who also toured with Summer, is now living in Atlanta, Georgia.

== See also ==
- List of artists who reached number one on the US Dance chart
- List of number-one dance hits (United States)
