= Jeanette Bazzell Turner =

American musician

- Born: Jeanette Bazzell c. 1962; St. Louis, Missouri, U.S.
- Other names: Jeanette Turner
- Occupation(s): Singer, realtor, writer
- Spouse: Ike Turner (m. 1995; div. 2000)

Jeanette Bazzell Turner is an American writer, singer-songwriter, recording artist, partner with Ike Turner Revue, C-YA Record Co., Eki Publishing Co. and known for her collaborations with her then-husband musician Ike Turner. Bazzell began her career in a St. Louis rock 'n' roll band, then progressed to a musical review. She was later the lead singer for the San Diego–based blues and rock band Backwater Blues.

== Life and career ==
Jeanette Bazzell is a native of St. Louis. Bazzell began her career as a lead singer for the rock 'n roll band Exodus. Bazzell sang with the director of entertainment for the Playboy Club in St. Louis, Missouri. She then joined the Joe Bozzi Revue before heading the Steve Marino Review. Bazzell sang with musician Ike Turner Jr. and provided vocals to his album Hard Labor in the 1980s. In 1988, he brought Bazzell to California to get a record deal and introduced her to his father Ike Turner. Her romance with Ike Turner began "about a month" after they met. She became Turner's vocalist as an Ikette.

"Ike doesn't get any recognition because of all the negative things [shown] in that movie and in his relationship with Tina … I went through things with Ike, too, but there's a time to forgive and to let go. To strip him from having the opportunity to get recognition in an area where he was entitled to deserve it, it's so wrong to me."

— Jeanette Bazzell Turner (2019)

Bazzell stood by Turner's side through a difficult period in his life. In 1990, he was convicted of drug charges and sentenced to four years in prison in 1990. In 1993, the biopic What’s Love Got To Do With It was released which dramatized Turner's volatile relationship with his ex-wife and former singing partner Tina Turner. In 2019, she told Palm Spring Life that the movie "assassinated Ike's career. But more than that, it broke his heart. It hurt him … because he helped a lot of big artists make it." After the film, Turner reformed his band as the Ike Turner Revue and their performances received positive reviews.

Bazzell and Turner became engaged in 1993. On July 4, 1995, they married in a private ceremony at Circus Circus Hotel & Resort, and their reception followed at the Las Vegas Hilton. This was Bazzell's first and only marriage; she became Turner's 13th wife. The couple lived together in San Diego and later in San Marcos. They appeared on various American talk shows, including The Arsenio Hall Show, Geraldo, and The Roseanne Barr Show.

Bazzell and Turner divorced in 2000, but they later rekindled their friendship. When Turner won a Grammy Award in 2007, Bazzell said, "That was huge for me. He taught me a lot—especially about the business." When Turner died on December 12, 2007, his death was announced to the press by Bazzell. According to the medical examiner, he died from "cocaine toxicity with other significant conditions, such as hypertensive cardiovascular disease and pulmonary emphysema." In 2012, Bazzell attended a keynote address by guitarist Wayne Kramer and told the room that Turner didn't die from a cocaine overdose. She later confided to journalist Dave Good that Turner died from "that psychotropic drug Seroquel … it blew his heart up." Turner was administered the drug by his caregiver to treat his bipolar disorder. She revealed his autopsy report said he had three broken ribs; She believes he was murdered.

Bazzell continues to perform and she also works in real estate. In 2006, she performed at the 5th Annual One Colorado Summer Music Festival. She performs various genres of music. Bazzell participated in the World Championship of Performing Arts and won five gold medals in country, rock 'n' roll, rap, gospel and blues.

== Discography ==
=== Vocal credits ===
- 1987: Hard Labor – Ike Turner Jr
- 1996: My Bluescountry – Ike Turner
- 1996: Without Love… I Have Nothing – Ike Turner
