= Soul the Hits =

Soul The Hits
- Jessie Smith, Robbie Montgomery, and Venetta Fields pictured on the cover

Studio album by The Ikettes
- Released: January 23, 1966
- Genre: R&B, soul, pop
- Label: Modern Records

The Ikettes chronology
Soul The Hits (1966)	In Person (1969)

Singles from So Fine
- 1. "Camel Walk" Released: December 1964; 2. "Peaches 'N' Cream" Released: February 1965; 3. "(He's Gonna Be) Fine, Fine, Fine" Released: May 1965; 4. "I'm So Thankful" Released: July 1965; 5. "(Never More) Lonely For You" Released: January 1966; 6. "Not That I Recall" Released: July 1966

Soul The Hits is the debut album by American girl group the Ikettes, released on Modern Records in 1966.

== Background ==
In 1960, Ike Turner wrote "A Fool in Love" for singer Art Lassiter. When Lassiter failed to show up for the recording session at Technisonic Studios, Turner had Lassiter's backup singers, the Artettes (Robbie Montgomery, Frances Hodges, and Sandra Harding) accompany Tina Turner on the recording. After the single became a hit, Ike Turner formed the Ike & Tina Turner Revue which included a trio of backing vocalist called the Ikettes. The first set of Ikettes to tour with the Revue were different from the trio on the recording. Hodges and Harding remained with Lassiter, and Montgomery was pregnant and unable to tour. Montgomery joined the Revue shortly after having her baby. The lineup went through many changes, but by 1964, the consistent set of Ikettes were Robbie Montgomery, Jessie Smith and Venetta Fields who are pictured on the cover of Soul The Hits.

== Singles ==
The album contains six previously released singles. The first single "Camel Walk" reached No. 107 on Billboard's Bubbling Under The Hot 100. Their second single, "Peaches 'N' Cream" became the biggest hit for the Ikettes since "I'm Blue (The Gong-Gong Song)" in 1961. It peaked at No. 36 on the Billboard Hot 100 and No. 28 on the R&B chart. The follow-up "(He's Gonna Be) Fine, Fine, Fine" reached No. 125 on Bubbling Under The Hot 100. The next single, "I'm So Thankful," was an R&B hit (No. 74 Pop, No. 12 R&B). "(Never More) Lonely For You" reached No. 122 on Bubbling Under The Hot 100. By the time the last single, "Not That I Recall," was released in 1966, Montgomery, Smith, and Fields had left the Revue to form The Mirettes.

== Reissues ==
In 2007, Soul The Hits was reissued on CD with 17 additional tracks by P-Vine Records (catalog no. PCD-93060).

== Track listing ==
Side A
No.	Title	Writer(s)	Producer	Length
1.	"I'm So Thankful"	Marc Gordon, Frank Wilson	Marc Gordon, Frank Wilson
2.	"Da Do Ron Ron"	Phil Spector, Ellie Greenwich, Jeff Barry
3.	"Camel Walk"	Ike Turner	Ike Turner
4.	"Can't Sit Down"	Frank Wilson
5.	"Lonely For You"	Ike Turner	Ike Turner
6.	"Not That I Recall"	Ike Turner	Ike Turner

Side B
No.	Title	Writer(s)	Producer	Length
1.	"Peaches 'N' Cream"	Steve Venet, Tommy Boyce	Steve Venet
2.	"Sally Go Round the Roses"	Lona Stevens, Zelma Sanders
3.	"Don't Feel Sorry For Me"	Jimmy Beasley	Marc Gordon, Frank Wilson
4.	"He's Gonna Be Fine"	Steve Venet, Tommy Boyce, Toni Wine	Ike Turner, Steve Venet
5.	"Nobody Loves Me"	Ike Turner	Ike Turner
6.	"It's Been So Long"	Ike Turner	Ike Turner
