= Sony Records =

Defunct American record label

- Founded: 1963
- Founder: Ike & Tina Turner
- Status: Defunct
- Distributor: CIRCA distributing firm
- Genre: R&B
- Country of origin: United States
- Location: Los Angeles, California

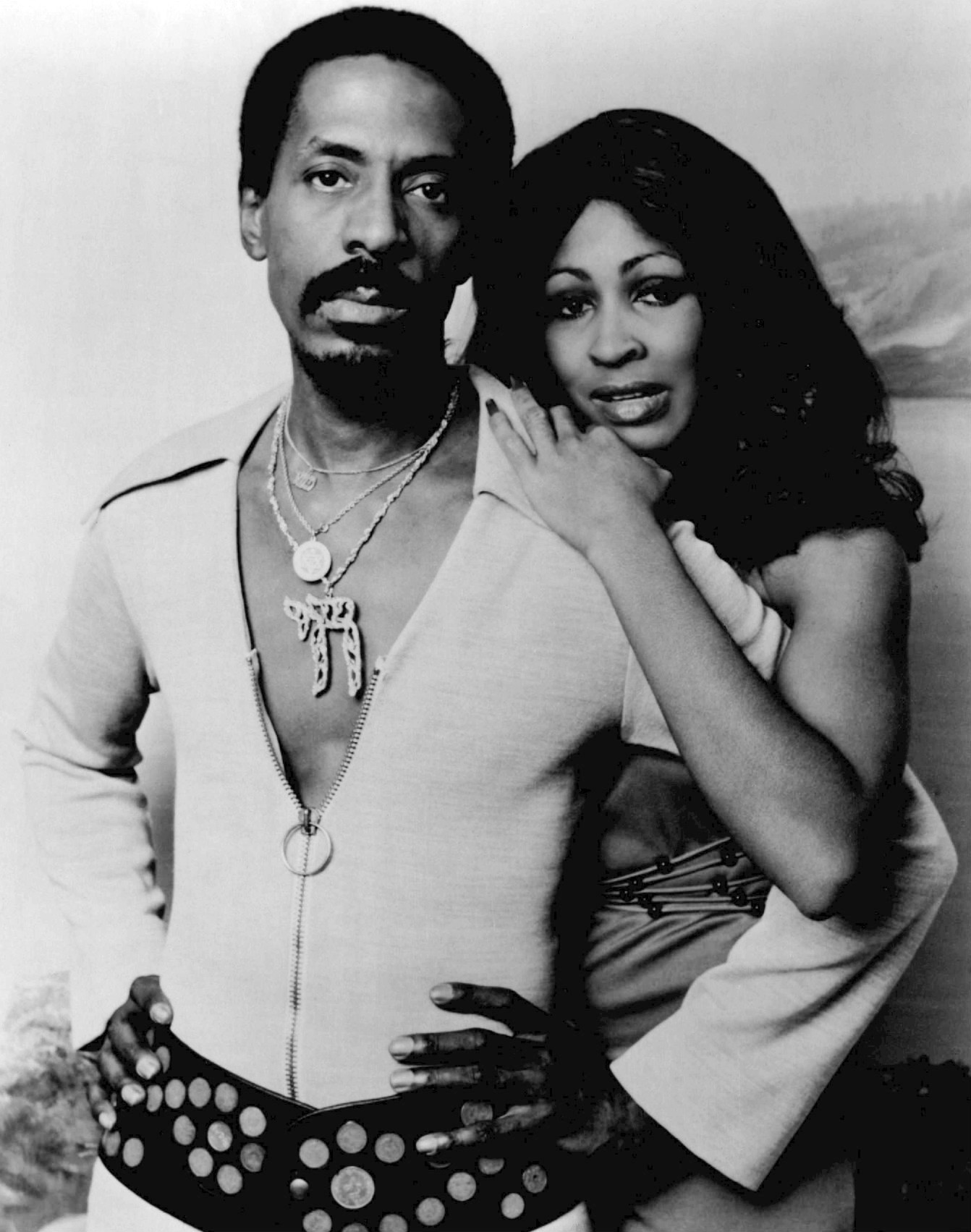
Ike and Tina Turner on the Midnight Special on Feb. 9 1974.

Sony Records was a record label founded by R&B duo Ike & Tina Turner in 1963. It was not affiliated with Sony Group Corporation.

Ike Turner produced singles by members of the Kings of Rhythm and the Ikettes on Sony Records. Records on the label were distributed by CIRCA distributing firm. CIRCA (Consolidated International Record Company of America) was formed in 1962 to operate as a releasing company for independent labels by working with various distributors around the US. After Venetta Fields released "You're Still My Baby" on Sony Records, Ike later changed the name to Sonja Records.

== Ike & Tina Turner ==
Ike &Tina Turner met in 1956 before Tina had changed her name from Anna Mae Bullock with the help of Ike to get her career started. The duo started to perform as the Ike Turner Revue. By 1962, they got married in Tijuana, Mexico. Ike had two children from a previous marriage, Ike Jr. and Michael, while Tina had one son, Craig, with Ike's bandmate Raymond Hill. While Ike and Tina both adopted each other's children, they did have one child together which was Ronnie. In total, the couple had four children.

Even though Ike and Tina Turner had a successful career together, their personal relationship was abusive. After years of enduring abuse, infidelity and dealing with Ike's drug addiction and cocaine possession, Tina divorced him in 1978. During their marriage, Tina attempted suicide because of the abuse from Ike. Tina went on to have a successful solo career winning four Grammys for her solo album "Private Dancer," which also sold over 20 million copies. From 1989 to 1991, Ike was in prison for cocaine possession. In 1991, Ike and Tina Turner were inducted into the Rock and Roll Hall of Fame. After he got out of prison, Ike's career went on and he won a Grammy in 2007 for his album "Risin' with the Blues."

In 2007, Ike died of a drug overdose in his home in San Marcos, California at the age of 76. Tina went on to live in Küsnacht, Switzerland, where she later died in 2023 due to long term illness.

== Discography ==
Catalog No.	Release date	Single (A-side, B-side)	Writer	Artist
111	Feb 1963	A: "Lonely Soldier"	Curtis Mayfield	Bobby John
111	Feb 1963	B: "The Bad Man"	Ike Turner	Bobby John
112	Apr 1963	A: "You're Still My Baby"	Chuck Willis	Venetta Fields
112	Apr 1963	B: "I'm Leaving You"	Ike Turner	Venetta Fields
113	1963	A: "Remove My Doubts"	Ike Turner	Stacy Johnson
113	1963	B: "Don't Believe 'Em"	Ike Turner	Stacy Johnson
114	1963	A: "What's That You've Got"	Ike Turner	Ernest Lane
114	1963	B: "Need My Help"	Ike Turner	Ernest Lane

== See also ==
- Sonja Records
- Innis Records
- Teena Records
- Prann Records
- List of record labels
