= Teena Records =

Record label

- Founded: 1963
- Founder: Ike & Tina Turner
- Status: Defunct
- Distributor: CIRCA distributing firm
- Genre: R&B, pop
- Country of origin: United States
- Location: Los Angeles, California

Teena Records was a record label founded by R&B duo Ike & Tina Turner in 1963. Ike Turner named the label after his wife Tina Turner. Records on Teena were distributed by CIRCA distributing firm. CIRCA (Consolidated International Record Company of America) was formed in 1962 to operate as a releasing company for independent labels by working with various distributors around the US.

While the Ike & Tina Turner Revue were constantly on the road performing, Ike Turner found time to record the artist in his band. Turner used this label to release singles by vocalist within the Revue, notably the Ikettes. He wrote and produced all the songs on the label. The second single, "Prisoner in Love" by the Ikettes, was changed to "No Bail in This Jail" in order to avoid confusion with "Prisoner of Love" by James Brown. "No Bail In This Jail (Prisoner In Love)" reached #126 on Billboard's Bubbling Under The Hot 100.

== Discography ==
Catalog No.	Release date	US	Single (A-side, B-side)	Artist
1701	Feb 1963		"Crazy In Love" b/w Pee Wee	Robbie Montgomery and The Ike-Ettes
1702	Apr 1963	126	"No Bail In This Jail (Prisoner In Love)" b/w "Those Words"	The Ikettes
1703	May 1963		"You've Got Me (Just Where You Want Me)" b/w "They Ain't Lovin' Ya"	Vernon Guy
1704	1963		"Love Me Or Leave Me" b/w "I'll Wait For You"	Flora Williams

== See also ==
- Sonja Records
- Innis Records
- Sony Records
- Prann Records
- List of record labels
