= Innis Records =

1964 record label by Ike Turner

- Parent company: Pompeii Music Corp.
- Founded: 1964
- Founder: Ike Turner
- Status: Defunct
- Genre: R&B, pop
- Location: Los Angeles California

Innis Records was a record label founded by musician Ike Turner in 1964. The label released singles from members within the Ike & Tina Turner Revue such as the Ikettes, and other acts Turner was producing. Turner hired George Grenier to handle his business affairs. The label was acquired by Pompeii Music Corp. in 1968.

== Discography ==
Catalog No.	Release date	US	US R&B	Single (A-side, B-side)	Artist
3000	Jan 1964			"Here's Your Heart" b/w "Here's Your Heart (Sing Along Without The Ikettes)"	The Ikettes
3001	Jan 1964			"No Puedes Extrañar (Lo Que Nunca Has Tenido)" b/w "Koonkie Cookie"	Gloria Garcia with Ike & Tina Revue
3002	Feb 1964			"You Can't Have Your Cake And Eat It Too" b/w "The Drag"	Ike & Dee Dee Johnson
6666	1966			"Betcha Can't Kiss Me (Just One Time Baby)" b/w "Don't Lie To Me (You Know I Know)"	Ike & Tina Turner
6668	1967			"I Better Get Ta' Steppen" b/w "Poor Sam"	Ike & Tina Turner
6667	Mar 1968	117	50	"So Fine" b/w "So Blue Over You"	Ike & Tina Turner and the Ikettes

== See also ==
- Pompeii Records
- Sonja Records
- Teena Records
- Sony Records
- Prann Records
- List of record labels
