= Prann Records =

Music record label

- Founded: 1963
- Founder: Ike Turner
- Status: Defunct
- Distributor: CIRCA distributing firm
- Genre: R&B
- Country of origin: United States
- Location: Los Angeles, California

Prann Records was a record label founded by musician Ike Turner in 1963. Turner used this label to release singles by artist he was producing outside of the Ike & Tina Turner Revue. Records on Prann were distributed by CIRCA distributing firm. CIRCA (Consolidated International Record Company of America) was formed in 1962 to operate as a releasing company for independent labels by working with various distributors around the US.

== Artists ==
Singer-songwriter George Jackson released his first single on Prann Jackson started writing songs while in his teens, and in 1963 introduced himself to Ike Turner at a concert. Turner took him to Cosimo Matassa's studios in New Orleans to record for Prann. Singer Fontella Bass recorded for Prann early in her career when she was a member of Oliver Sain's band. Turner also recorded for Prann under his alias Little Bones.

== Discography ==
Catalog No.	Release date	Single (A-side, B-side)	Writer	Artist
5001	Feb 1963	A: "What I Say"	Ray Charles	Little Bones
5001	Feb 1963	B: "Ya Ya"	Lee Dorsey, Morgan Robinson	Little Bones
5002	Apr 1963	A: "Cott'n Pickin'"	Ike Turner	The Turnabouts
5002	Apr 1963	B: "Gettin' Away"	Ike Turner	The Turnabouts
5003	1963	A: "Won't Nobody Cha-Cha With Me"	George Jackson	George Jackson and The Vanlon
5003	1963	B: "Who Was That Guy"	George Jackson	George Jackson and The Vanlon
5004	May 1963	A: "Doin' The Thing"	Ike Turner	Jerry Wilson
5004	May 1963	B: "Spilled Tears"	Ike Turner	Jerry Wilson
5005	Jun 1963	A: "I Love The Man"	Oliver Sain	Fontella Bass
5005	Jun 1963	B: "My Good Loving"	Oliver Sain	Fontella Bass
5006	1963	A: "Going To The River"		Little Bones
5006	1963	B: "I Know"		Little Bones

== See also ==
- Sonja Records
- Innis Records
- Teena Records
- Sony Records
- List of record labels
