= Where It All Began (Bo Diddley album) =

Studio album by Bo Diddley
- Released: May 1972
- Recorded: 1972
- Studio: Eldorado Recording Studios, Burbank, CA, Aragon Recording Studios, Vancouver, B.C. and Soundview Environmental Studios, Kings Park, NY
- Genre: Rock and roll; blues; soul
- Length: 34:52
- Label: Chess; CH 50016
- Producer: Johnny Otis, Pete Welding

Bo Diddley chronology
| Another Dimension (1971) | Where It All Began (1972) | The London Bo Diddley Sessions (1973) |

Singles from Where It All Began
- 1. "Infatuation" Released: 1972; 2. "Bo Diddley-Itis" Released: 1972

Where It All Began is the 16th studio album by American rock and roll musician Bo Diddley, released by the Chess label in May 1972. The album was produced by Johnny Otis and Pete Welding. "Infatuation" and "Bo Diddley-Itis" were both released as singles, with each other as the flip sides.

== Reception ==
Professional ratings
Review scores
| Source | Rating |
|---|---|
| AllMusic | 3/5 stars |
| Billboard | (unrated) |

AllMusic awarded the album 3 out of 5 stars with reviewer Bruce Eder stating "Johnny Otis and Pete Welding produced this surprisingly successful soul effort by Bo, which succeeded in reshaping his sound ... Unfortunately, none of this mattered to the people who still cared about Bo Diddley -- they wanted the beat and the old sound ... He gave them his classics in concert, but not on this album. And it all came so late in the day: not only in terms of Bo's identification as anything but an oldies act, but as part of the history of Chess Records (now subsumed into the GRT corporate operation, the Chess imprint having no meaning or significance), that Where It All Began vanished from sight, leaving scarcely a trace or a ripple on the charts.".

== Track listing ==
All compositions by Ellas McDaniel except where noted.

=== Side one ===
1. "I've Had It Hard" – 3:13
2. "Woman" (Ellas McDaniel, Kay McDaniel) – 3:06
3. "Look at Grandma" (Cornelia Redmond, Kay McDaniel) – 3:31
4. "A Good Thing" (Oliver Sain) – 2:37
5. "Bad Trip" (Redmond, Kay McDaniel) – 6:00

=== Side two ===
1. "Hey, Jerome" (Cornelia Redmond, Ellas McDaniel) – 3:08
2. "Infatuation" (Ellas McDaniel, Kay McDaniel) – 3:43
3. "Take It All Off" (Eva Darby) – 3:20
4. "Bo Diddley-Itis" – 5:40

== Personnel ==
- Bo Diddley – vocals, guitar
- Dave Archuletta – organ
- Tom Thompson, Shuggie Otis (track 8) – guitar
- Richard Davis, Terry Gottlieb (tracks 4 & 7) – bass
- Ed O'Donnell, Johnny Otis (track 1) – drums
- Gloria Scott – background vocals
- Vera Hamilton – background vocals
- Connie Redmond – background vocals, lead vocal on "A Good Thing"
- Harriette Reynolds – background vocals

=== Technical ===
- Johnny Otis, Pete Welding – producers
- Esmond Edwards – executive producer
- John Cevetello – engineer
- Doug Johnson – cover art
- David Krieger – art direction
- Jim Marshal – liner photography
- Susan Mitchell - liner art
