= Phi-Dan Records =

Phi-Dan
- Parent company: Phil Spector Productions
- Founded: 1965
- Founder: Phil Spector
- Defunct: 1966
- Status: Defunct
- Genre: Pop, R&B
- Country of origin: United States
- Location: Los Angeles, California

Phi-Dan was an American subsidiary record label of Phil Spector Productions formed in 1965 by producer Phil Spector.

== History ==
By 1965, Phil Spector had achieved great success with his label Philles. He produced chart topping singles such as "He's A Rebel" and "You've Lost That Lovin' Feelin'". Phi-Dan was partly created to keep promoter Danny Davis occupied. "He wanted to give me a piece of the action because I didn't have a piece of the Philles action," Davis said. The label name is a hybrid of Spector and Davis' first names. Spector also wanted to capitalize on Davis winning the industry's Promotional Man of the Year award in 1964 and 1965.

== Releases ==
A handful of singles were released on Phi-Dan by artist including Betty Willis, the Lovelites, and the Ikettes. According to Davis, the records on Phi-Dan consisted of "permutations of the various backing groups he was using in Hollywood". Unlike Philles recordings, none of the releases on Phi-Dan were produced by Spector himself.

The single "Home of the Brave" by Bonnie & The Treasures peaked at No. 77 on the Billboard Hot 100 in 1965.

== Discography ==
Catalog #	Release date	Single (A-side, B-side)	Writer(s)	Producer(s)	Artist
5000	2/1965	"Kiss Me Now (Don't Kiss Me Later)" b/w "We're Not Old Enough"	Marty Cooper, Bobby Susser	Marty Cooper, Bobby Susser, Silberstein	Florence DeVore
5001	3/1965	"Act Naturally" b/w "Soul"	Buck Owens	Leon Russell	Betty Willis
5005	7/1965	"Home of the Brave" b/w "Our Song"	Barry Mann, Cynthia Weil	Jerry Riopell	Bonnie & The Treasures
5006	10/1965	"Yesterday" b/w "Traffic Jam"	John Lennon, Paul McCartney	Atlas Artists Productions	Al De Lory
5007	11/1965	"Seven Million People" b/w "You Can't Grow Peaches On A Cherry Tree"	H. Greenfield, H. Miller		George McCannon, III
5008	1/1966	"(When) I Get Scared" b/w "Malady"	Doc Pomus, Pete Andreoli, Vini Poncia	Peter Anders, Vini Poncia	The Lovelites
5009	8/1966	"What'cha Gonna Do (When I Leave You)" b/w "Down, Down"	Ike Turner	Ike Turner	The Ikettes
5010	9/1966	"Lovers Wonderland" b/w "Sugar Plum Blues"	Gil Garfield, Perry Botkin Jr, Johnny Cole	Botkin-Garfield Productions	Sugar Plums
