= The Blackberries =

American female vocal trio

- The Blackberries, circa 1973. Left to right: Billie Barnum, Venetta Fields, Clydie King

Background information
- Occupations: Singers; songwriters
- Years active: 1969-1979
- Labels: Mowest; A&M Records
- Past members: Clydie King; Venetta Fields; Sherlie Matthews; Merry Clayton; Patrice Holloway; Billie Barnum; Carlena Williams

The Blackberries were an American female vocal trio. Originally comprising Venetta Fields, Sherlie Matthews, and Clydie King—each an in-demand session singer—the group first sang together in 1969 and released their first credited single with Pacific Gas & Electric in 1970. They were subsequently assembled as a formal group at the suggestion of Steve Marriott of Humble Pie. The lineup later changed, with Matthews replaced by Billie Barnum, and continued to evolve throughout the decade. The Blackberries performed and recorded with a range of artists, including Humble Pie, Pink Floyd, Ringo Starr, and the Supremes, and released recordings on labels such as Motown's West Coast subsidiary Mowest and A&M Records.

== History ==
In 1969, singers Venetta Fields, Sherlie Matthews and Clydie King were in high demand as backing vocalists. Fields was previously an Ikette in The Ike & Tina Turner Revue. King was previously a Raelette, backing Ray Charles. Matthews was a singer-songwriter at Mirwood Records and Motown Records. They joined forces and created the Blackberries, which Matthews named after Motown founder Berry Gordy. The Los Angeles Times felt the name was "an undignified one for a group of Black women."

Their single "Somebody Up There" (MW 5020F) was intended to be released on Mowest in June 1972, but was unavailable until Hip-O Select issued a compilation album The Complete Motown Singles, Volume 12A: 1972 in 2013. In 1971, the DJ Tom Clay hired them in Los Angeles to record for his hit spoken word record "What the World Needs Now Is Love/Abraham, Martin, and John".

In 1972, Steve Marriott of Humble Pie asked Fields to find two other vocalists for an album session. Fields chose King and Matthews, who she had already recorded with as the Blackberries. They recorded an unreleased Blackberries album with Humble Pie as the backing band. Their single "Twist And Shout" was released on A&M Records in 1973. The Blackberries also provided backing vocals to the Humble Pie album Eat It (1973). When Marriott asked them to tour with Humble Pie, Matthews declined due to personal commitments. Matthews chose Billie Barnum as her replacement, and the Blackberries toured with Humble Pie in 1973.

Guitarist David Gilmour of Pink Floyd was friends with Humble Pie drummer Jerry Shirley. Gilmour asked Shirley if the Pink Floyd could hire the Blackberries for two European concert dates; Marriott reluctantly agreed. The Blackberries consisting of Billie Barnum, Venetta Fields and Clydie King toured with Pink Floyd on the Dark Side of the Moon Tour in October 1973. By 1974, the Blackberries were Venetta Fields, Billie Barnum, and Carlena Williams. They appeared on Humble Pie's 1974 album Thunderbox. That year, Pink Floyd's manager invited them to tour with the band. Fields and Williams toured with Pink Floyd on their 1974 French Summer Tour and British Winter Tour later that year. The duo also sang backing vocals on Pink Floyd's 1975 album Wish You Were Here and performed on their North American Tour promoting the album.

Fields and King acted as the Oreos, Barbra Streisand's backing singers in the musical film A Star Is Born (1976), and sang on the accompanying soundtrack A Star Is Born.

== Discography ==
=== Singles ===
- 1970: Pacific Gas & Electric with The Blackberries – "Are You Ready?" (Columbia 4-45158)
- 1973: "Twist And Shout" / "Don't Change On Me" (A&M 1442)
- 1974: "Yesterday's Music" / "Life Is Full Of Joy" (A&M 1630-S)

=== Album appearances ===
- 1974: Super Soul (Disc-o-Tek) (A&M Records)
- 2010: A Cellarful Of Motown! Volume 4 (Motown Records / Universal Records)
- 2013:The Complete Motown Singles | Vol. 12A: 1972 (Hip-O Select)

=== Backing vocal credits ===
- 1969: Diana Ross & the Supremes - "No Matter What Sign You Are"
- 1970: Fever Tree – For Sale
- 1970: Clydie King – Direct Me
- 1970: Pacific Gas & Electric – Are You Ready?
- 1970: The Supremes - Right On
- 1971: Larry Murray – Sweet Country Suite
- 1971: Ronnie Milsap – Ronnie Milsap
- 1971: Crabby Appleton – Rotten To The Core!
- 1971: PG&E – PG&E
- 1971: Tom Clay – "What the World Needs Now Is Love/Abraham, Martin and John"
- 1971: Rita Coolidge – Rita Coolidge
- 1971: Joel Scott Hill, John Barbata and Chris Ethridge – L.A. Getaway
- 1971: Hoyt Axton – Joy to the World
- 1972: Arlo Guthrie – Hobo's Lullaby
- 1972: Captain Beefheart and The Magic Band – Clear Spot
- 1972: Martha Reeves and the Vandellas - Black Magic
- 1972: Nolan Porter – Nolan
- 1973: Pink Floyd - The Dark Side of the Moon
- 1973: Humble Pie – Eat It
- 1973: Sammy Johns – Sammy Johns
- 1973: Sherman Hayes – Catman
- 1973: Diane Kolby – Diane Kolby
- 1974: Ringo Starr – Goodnight Vienna
- 1974: Humble Pie – Thunderbox
- 1974: Tim Buckley – Look at the Fool
- 1975: Pink Floyd – Wish You Were Here
- 1977: Steely Dan – Aja
