= Peaches 'N' Cream (The Ikettes song) =

Single by The Ikettes

from the album Soul The Hits
- B-side: "The Biggest Players"
- Released: February 1965
- Genre: Pop, Soul
- Length: 2:15
- Label: Modern Records
- Songwriters: Steve Venet and Tommy Boyce
- Producer: Steve Venet

The Ikettes singles chronology
"Camel Walk" (1964)	"Peaches 'N' Cream" (1965)	"(He's Gonna Be) Fine, Fine, Fine" (1965)

"Peaches 'N' Cream" is a song written by Steve Venet and Tommy Boyce, originally released by The Ikettes on Modern Records in 1965. It became the first Billboard Top 40 single for The Ikettes since their debut "I'm Blue (The Gong-Gong Song)" in 1961.

== Overview ==
"Peaches 'N' Cream" is the second single from the Ikettes debut album Soul The Hits. Unlike their previous releases which were written and produced by Ike Turner, "Peaches 'N' Cream" was written by Steve Venet and Tommy Boyce; produced by Venet. The record was released on the newly revived Modern Records in February 1965. The single peaked at No. 36 on the Billboard Hot 100 and No. 28 on the R&B chart. It was the best-selling R&B record for Modern in 1965. By the time the album was released in 1966, the Ikettes (Robbie Montgomery, Venetta Fields, and Jessie Smith) had left the Ike & Tina Turner Revue and became The Mirettes.

== Critical reception ==
Professional ratings
Review scores
Source	Rating
Record World	4/4 stars

Cash Box (March 13, 1965):

Looks as if the Ikettes will have no trouble in reaching the charts with this latest Modern entry called "Peaches 'N' Cream." The side is a rollicking, hard-driving pop-r&b handclapper about a lucky lass who hooks up with the right guy. The flip, "The Biggest Players," is a low-down, shufflin' affair which details the rules of the romance-game. Also merits a close look.

Montreal DJ Ruby Jane described "Peaches 'N' Cream" on WeFunk Radio as "a boisterous romp of a '60s R&B tune about the joys and perils of young love... It could be called schoolyard soul, with girls in pigtails chanting it as they play Double Dutch. The harmonica playfully echoes the line peaches and cream, and the throaty ah, ah, ah at the top of the chorus is delivered with a raucous enthusiasm that shouts at you to get on the dance floor. This is one of those girl-group anthems that’s fun and rowdy and fills you with sweet, sweet joy."

== Chart performance ==
Chart (1965)	Peak position
CAN RPM	11
US Billboard Hot 100	36
US Billboard Hot R&B Singles	28
US Cash Box Top 100	52
US Cash Box Top 50 R&B	7
US Record World 100 Top Pops	34
US Record World Top 40 R&B	10
