= Sonja Records =

Los Angeles-based record label

- Founded: 1963
- Founder: Ike Turner
- Status: Defunct
- Distributors: Superior Record Sales Co. (New York); Schwartz Brothers, Inc. (Washington); California Records (Los Angeles); Concord Record Sales (Cleveland); All State (Chicago)
- Genre: Soul, R&B, pop
- Country of origin: United States
- Location: Los Angeles, California

Sonja Records was a Los Angeles-based record label founded by musician Ike Turner in 1963. Turner set up the label to release singles from the Ike & Tina Turner Revue, which included his then wife, R&B singer Tina Turner, as well as other artists he was producing. Tina Turner's first record as a solo artist was released on Sonja Records in 1964.

While Sonja Records may not have achieved the same level of commercial success as some major record labels of the time, it played a role in Ike Turner's career and allowed him to release his music independently. Ike Turner is also known for his work with Tina Turner and their iconic performances as a duo, but their biggest hits together came later when they were signed to different record labels.

In the Northeast, Sonja was distributed by Superior Record Sales Company, Inc. in New York, and Schwartz Brothers Inc. in the Washington, Baltimore and Philadelphia markets. In the Midwest, Concord Record Sales in Cleveland and All State Record Distributing Company in Chicago. On the West Coast, California Records in Los Angeles.

== Discography ==
Catalog No.	Release date	US R&B	Single (A-side, B-side)	Writer(s)	Artist
2001	Sep 1963		A: "If I Can't Be The First"	Ike Turner	Ike & Tina Turner
2001	Sep 1963		B: "I'm Going Back Home"	Ike Turner	Ike & Tina Turner
2002	1963		A: "The Hunter And The Rabbit'	Ike Turner	Vernon & Stacy
2002	1963		B: "My Life Time Love"	Ike Turner	Vernon & Stacy
2003	1963		A: "Blue With A Broken Heart"	Ike Turner	Flora Williams
2003	1963		B: "Mind In A Whirl"	Fred Cober, Ike Turner	Flora Williams
2004	1964		A: "You've Tasted Anothers Lips"	Jimmy Thomas	Jimmy Thomas
2004	1964		B: "I Love Nobody But You"	Ike Turner	Jimmy Thomas
2005	Feb 1964	29	A: "You Can't Miss Nothing That You Never Had"	Ike Turner	Ike & Tina Turner
2005	Feb 1964	29	B: "God Gave Me You"	Ike Turner	Ike & Tina Turner
2005	Feb 1964		A: "Poor Little Fool"	Oliver Sain	Fontella Bass
2005	Feb 1964		B: "This Would Make Me Happy"	Oliver Sain	Fontella Bass
2007	1964		A: "Anything - To Make It With You"	Ike Turner	Vernon Guy
2007	1964		B: "Walking Down The Isle"	Ike Turner	Vernon Guy
5000	1964		A: "Too Many Ties That Bind"	Ike Turner	Tina Turner
5000	1964		B: "We Need An Understanding"	Ike Turner	Tina Turner
5001	1964		A: "Getting Nasty"	Ike Turner	Nasty Minds
5001	1964		B: "Nutting Up"	Ike Turner	Nasty Minds
5002	1964		A: "Strange"	Billy Preston	Ike & Tina Turner
5002	1964		B. "You're A Jive Playboy"	Ike Turner	Ike & Tina Turner

== See also ==
- Innis Records
- Teena Records
- Sony Records
- Prann Records
- List of record labels
