= It's Your Thing (film) =

- Directed by: Mike Gargiulo
- Produced by: Betty Sperber
- Distributed by: Medford Films
- Release date: August 21, 1970
- Running time: 2 hrs

It's your Thing is an independently filmed 1970 concert film funded by The Isley Brothers. The film was directed by Mike Gargiulo and the production was supervised by Betty Sperber.

== Concert ==
The concert was filmed at Yankee Stadium in the Bronx, New York on June 21, 1969. It was recorded and subsequently released as a live album titled Live at Yankee Stadium on T-Neck Records in October 1969. Ike & Tina Turner who are featured in the film are not included on the live album because they did not participate in the original concert. Their segment was filmed separately in 1970 and added to the film.

=== List of performers ===
- The Isley Brothers
- Patty Austin
- Five Stairsteps and Cubie
- The Edwin Hawkins Singers
- Jackie "Moms" Mabley
- Clara Ward Singers
- Judy White
- The Young Gents
- The Brooklyn Bridge
- The Winstons
- Ike & Tina Turner

== Release ==
It's your Thing was released by Medford Films in theaters in Chicago, New York and Los Angeles on August 21, 1970. Mayor John V. Lindsay of New York attended a special preview of the film a day before its release. Proceeds from the New York premiere went to the Mayor's Commission on Youth and Physical Fitness.

The film has not been released on home video. The UCLA Film & Television Archive has a non-circulating "research and student center" copy of this film on VHS and 35 mm reels.
