= I'm Blue (The Gong-Gong Song) =

Single by The Ikettes
- B-side: "Find My Baby"
- Released: November 1961
- Recorded: 1961
- Genre: R&B, Soul
- Length: 2:33
- Label: Atco
- Songwriter: Ike Turner
- Producer: Ike & Tina Turner

The Ikettes singles chronology
"I'm Blue (The Gong-Gong Song)" (1961)	"Troubles On My Mind" (1962)

"I'm Blue (The Gong-Gong Song)" is a song written by Ike Turner and recorded by Ike & Tina Turner's backing trio The Ikettes in 1961. In 2017, Billboard ranked the song No. 63 on their list of 100 Greatest Girl Group Songs of All Time.

== Overview ==
Like most of the Ike & Tina Turner Revue's music during this time, it was recorded while the group was on the road. By 1961, the formerly known Artettes had been singing as a backing trio with Ike & Tina for over a year, having been involved since the hit, "A Fool in Love". To bide time in the studio, Ike Turner wrote a song custom-made for the girl group.

Tina Turner herself was involved in the recording, helping to arrange the vocals and could be heard singing along in the background. Ike Turner credited the song's production to him and Tina. Since Ike & Tina recorded for Sue Records, Ike Turner decided to distribute the record to another company, agreeing to sign an advance to Atlantic Records' Atco subsidiary in late 1961 for the song.

Released in November 1961, the song became a national hit reaching No. 19 on the Billboard Hot 100 and No. 3 on the R&B chart. "I'm Blue (The Gong-Gong Song)" was the fifth hit single associated with the Ike & Tina Turner Revue and the first of three charting singles for the original Ikettes between 1962 and 1965.

== Later versions and samples ==
The song would later be recorded by:

- The Spencer Davis Group
- The Newbeats on their debut album Bread & Butter
- Sylvie Vartan (called "Gong Gong" and recorded in French)
- The Shangri-Las
- The Sweet Inspirations
- Decades later, the song, in its Sweet Inspirations version, would famously be sampled by Salt-n-Pepa on their 1993 hit, "Shoop". Upon hearing of the news of his song being sampled, Ike Turner re-recorded the song with Joe Louis Walker that same year.

== In popular culture ==
- "I'm Blue (The Gong-Gong Song)" is featured on the soundtrack of the 1988 film Hairspray
- The song also appears in Kill Bill Volume 1, where it is performed by The 5.6.7.8's.

== Chart performance ==
=== Weekly charts ===
Chart (1962)	Peak position
US Billboard Hot 100	19
US Billboard Hot R&B Sides	3
US Billboard Honor Roll of Hits	19
US Cash Box Top 100	16
US Cash Box Top 50 R&B	4

=== Year-end charts ===
Chart (1962)	Rank
US Billboard Hot 100 singles	94

== Personnel ==
- Lead vocal by Delores Johnson
- Background vocals by Joshie Armstead, Eloise Hester and Tina Turner
- Instrumentation by Ike Turner (piano) and The Kings of Rhythm
- Written by Ike Turner
- Produced by Ike Turner and Tina Turner (listed as "A I-&-T-T Production")
