= Modern Records =

American record label (1945–1969)

- Parent company: Ace Records (UK)
- Founded: 1945
- Defunct: 1969
- Status: Defunct
- Genre: Jazz, blues, rhythm and blues, rock
- Country of origin: U.S.
- Location: Los Angeles, California

Modern Records (Modern Music Records before 1947) was an American record company and label formed in 1945 in Los Angeles by the Bihari brothers. Modern's artists included Hadda Brooks, Etta James, Joe Houston, Little Richard, Ike & Tina Turner and John Lee Hooker. The label released some of the most influential blues and R&B records of the 1940s and 1950s.

== History ==
In the beginning, Modern bought master recordings from other small labels, as with the purchase of 32 unreleased Gold Star Records master recordings by Lightnin' Hopkins and Lil' Son Jackson for $2,500 from Bill Quinn in 1951. The Biharis also often used pseudonyms to give themselves writing credit on songs. Saul Bihari, for example, (whose middle name was Samuel) used the name Sam Ling as a songwriting pseudonym. Having started as an R&B label, Modern was later one of the few R&B labels to routinely cover rhythm and blues hits on other labels, apparently in an attempt to broaden their appeal and reach the popular market.

In 1958, the Bihari brothers formed Kent Records and stopped issuing records on Modern. In 1964, the Modern imprint was revived and the Ikettes released a few successful singles in 1965, but the company went bankrupt a few years later and ceased operations. The catalog went with the management into Kent Records. This back catalog was eventually licensed to the UK label Ace Records in the 1980s and later sold outright during the 1990s.

Currently, Ace Records of the U.K, Universal Of the U.S., and P-VINE hold the rights to Modern/Kent.

Yuletide Records was a daughter record label of Modern, specialized only in Christmas music.

== Management and staff ==
- Saul, Jules and Joe Bihari were the main people who ran the label. Their older brother Lester was only there sporadically.
- Ike Turner was a talent scout and session musician for Modern Records in the 1950s. Artists Turner discovered for Modern include Bobby "Blue" Bland, Howlin' Wolf, and Rosco Gordon. According to B.B. King and Joe Bihari, Turner introduced King to the Bihari brothers which led to his RPM releases.
- Tony Hilder was an A&R man for Modern Records in the late 1950s. Later he went on to form his own labels, first CT Records and later owner and president of Impact Records.
- Austin McCoy was an artist, session musician and recording session director with Modern Records. He left Modern in late 1950 to take up an A&R post with Mercury Records at their Beverly Hills office.

== Albums ==
- Modern Music: The First Year – 1945 (Ace CDTOP 1339, 2012)

The following albums were released in mono with catalogue numbers "M-70nn" and in stereo with catalogue numbers "MST-8nn":

- –00 Era of Tommy Dorsey
- –01 Era of Benny Goodman
- –02 Era of Charlie Barnet
- –03 Era of Glenn Miller
- –04 Era of Woody Herman
- –05 Era of the Big Bands
- –06 Dixieland
- –07 Polka Party Time
- –08 Honky Tonk Piano
- –09 The Strauss Waltzes
- –10 Day Dreams
- –11 Organ Gems
- –12 Cha Cha Cha
- –13 Sing-A-Long
- –14 Rock and Roll Party
- –15 The Heart of Spain
- –16 Oldies and Goodies
- –17 Progressive Percussion
- –18 Hawaiian Holiday
- –19 Era of Hank Williams
- –20 Tradewinds to Hawaii
- –21 Dynamic Percussion
- –22 Mambo Cha Cha Cha
- –23 The Fabulous Ink Spots

== Selected singles ==
Catalog No.	Release date	US	US R&B	Single (A-side, B-side)	Artist
624	Oct 1948	—	1	"Blues After Hours" b/w "I'm Still In Love With You"	Pee Wee Crayton
627	Nov 1948	—	1	"Boogie Chillen" b/w "Sally May"	John Lee Hooker
704	Oct 1949	—	5	"Little School Girl" b/w Suitcase Blues"	Smokey Hogg
714	Oct 1949	—	6	"Crawlin' King Snake" b/w "Drifting from Door to Door"	John Lee Hooker
835	Sep 1951	—	1	"I'm in the Mood" b/w "How Can You Do It"	John Lee Hooker
848	Dec 1951	—	—	"Crying All Night Long" b/w "Dry Up Baby"	Robert Bland
857	Feb 1952	—	7	"The Wind Is Blowin" b/w "Would My Baby Make A Change"	Jimmy Witherspoon
860	Mar 1952	—	—	"Ramblin' On My Mind" b/w "Just An Army Boy"	Boyd Gilmore
864	Apr 1952	—	—	"Bad Women Bad Whiskey" b/w "You're My Angel"	Little Junior Parker and the Blue Flames
947	Jan 1955	—	1	"The Wallflower" b/w "Hold Me, Squeeze Me"	Etta James and "The Peaches"
961	Jun 1955	—	—	"Mary Lou" b/w "Don't Think I Will"	Young Jessie, Maxwell Davis & Orchestra
962	Aug 1955	—	6	"Good Rockin' Daddy" b/w "Crazy Feeling"	Etta James, Maxwell Davis & Orchestra
1002	Sep 1956	—	—	"Hit, Git And Split" b/w "Don't Happen No More"	Young Jessie
1005	Oct 1956	—	7	"Goodnight My Love (Pleasant Dreams)" b/w "I Want You With Me Xmas"	Jessie Belvin
1022	Jun 1957	—	—	"By The Light Of The Silvery Moon" b/w "Come What May"	Etta James
1027	Nov 1957	—	—	"Just To Say Hello" b/w "My Satellite"	Jesse Belvin
1003	Dec 1964	107	—	"Camel Walk" b/w "Nobody Loves Me"	The Ikettes
1005	Feb 1965	36	28	"Peaches 'N' Cream" b/w "The Biggest Players"	The Ikettes
1007	May 1965	107	32	"Good Bye, So Long" b/w "Hurt Is All You Gave Me"	Ike & Tina Turner
1011	Jul 1965	74	12	"I'm So Thankful" b/w "Don't Feel Sorry For Me"	The Ikettes
1012	Aug 1965	134	—	"I Don't Need" b/w "Gonna Have Fun"	Ike & Tina Turner
1015	Jan 1966	122	—	"(Never More) Lonely For You" b/w "Sally Go Round the Roses"	The Ikettes
1030	1967	—	—	"Bring It Back Home To Me" b/w "Slippin' And Slidin'"	Little Richard

== Subsidiaries ==
- Kent Records
- Crown Records
- Flair Records
- Meteor Records
- RPM Records
- Yuletide Records (Christmas music)
