= The Collected Recordings: Sixties to Nineties =

Compilation album by Tina Turner
- Released: November 15, 1994
- Recorded: 1960–1993
- Genre: Pop; rock; soul; R&B
- Length: 194:48
- Label: Capitol

Tina Turner chronology
What's Love Got to Do with It (1993)	The Collected Recordings: Sixties to Nineties (1994)	Wildest Dreams (1996)

Professional ratings
Review scores
Source	Rating
AllMusic	3/5 stars

The Collected Recordings: Sixties to Nineties is a 16-bit digitally remastered three-disc compilation album by American singer Tina Turner. The 48-track compilation was released in the United States on November 15, 1994, by Capitol Records.

== Overview ==
The set collects recordings from Turner's—at the time—30-year-long career, starting with her 1960 debut single with Ike & Tina Turner, "A Fool in Love", and concluding with 1993's "I Don't Wanna Fight" from the soundtrack to the biographical film What's Love Got to Do with It.

=== Disc one ===
Disc one focuses on Turner's career with the Ike & Tina Turner Revue featuring a selection of their singles and best-known cover versions such as "It's Gonna Work Out Fine", "I Idolize You", "River Deep - Mountain High", "Bold Soul Sister", "Nutbush City Limits", Otis Redding's "I've Been Loving You Too Long", Sly & the Family Stone's "I Want to Take You Higher", The Beatles' "Come Together", Creedence Clearwater Revival's "Proud Mary" and The Rolling Stones "Honky Tonk Women".

=== Disc two ===
Disc two opens with Turner's first solo single "Acid Queen" from the film version of The Who's rock opera Tommy followed by one of the last recordings she made with her former husband, her cover version of Led Zeppelin's "Whole Lotta Love" taken from the Acid Queen album in 1975. The disc continues with two of the songs Turner recorded with the B.E.F. (British Electric Foundation) in the early 1980s that became the starting point of her comeback, "Ball of Confusion" and "A Change Is Gonna Come" - both tracks however are remixes dating from 1991, live tracks like Prince's "Let's Pretend We're Married", Robert Palmer's "Addicted to Love" and ZZ Top's "Legs", her subsequent duets with Bryan Adams, Eric Clapton and Rod Stewart, single B-sides such as "When I Was Young" and "Don't Turn Around" coupled with a few rarities like "Johnny and Mary" from the 1982 soundtrack Summer Lovers and the 1983 demo recording "Games".

=== Disc three ===
Disc three comprises fifteen of Turner's greatest hits following her comeback with the 1984 Private Dancer album, among them "Let's Stay Together", "What's Love Got to Do with It", "Typical Male", "What You Get Is What You See" "The Best" and "Steamy Windows".

=== Omissions ===
Notable omissions from the Collected Recordings track list are, among others, tracks from Turner's solo albums, Tina Turns the Country On! (1974), Rough (1978) and Love Explosion (1979), recorded for United Artists/EMI. The single "One of the Living" from the Mad Max: Beyond Thunderdome soundtrack is also missing.

== Track listing ==
Disc one – Ike & Tina Turner hits
No.	Title	Writer(s)	Original album	Length
1.	"A Fool in Love"	Ike Turner	The Soul of Ike & Tina Turner (1961)	2:53
2.	"It's Gonna Work Out Fine"	Rose Marie McCoy; Sylvia McKinney	Dynamite! (1962)	3:03
3.	"I Idolize You"	Ike Turner	The Soul of Ike & Tina Turner (1961)	2:52
4.	"Poor Fool"	Ike Turner	Dynamite! (1962)	2:33
5.	"A Letter from Tina"	Ike Turner	The Soul of Ike & Tina Turner (1961)	2:34
6.	"Finger Poppin'"	Ike Turner	Live! The Ike & Tina Turner Show (1965)	2:47
7.	"River Deep – Mountain High"	Phil Spector; Jeff Barry; Ellie Greenwich	River Deep – Mountain High (1966)	3:39
8.	"Crazy 'Bout You Baby"	Sonny Boy Williamson (Note: Credited as W. Williamson)	Outta Season (1969)	3:26
9.	"I've Been Loving You Too Long"	Otis Redding; Jerry Butler	Outta Season (1969)	3:54
10.	"Bold Soul Sister"	Ike Turner; Tina Turner	The Hunter (1969)	2:36
11.	"I Want to Take You Higher"	Sly Stone	Come Together (1970)	2:54
12.	"Come Together"	John Lennon; Paul McCartney	Come Together (1970)	3:42
13.	"Honky Tonk Women"	Mick Jagger; Keith Richards	Come Together (1970)	3:10
14.	"Proud Mary"	John Fogerty	Workin' Together (1970)	4:59
15.	"Nutbush City Limits"	Tina Turner	Nutbush City Limits (1973)	3:00
16.	"Sexy Ida" (Part I)	Tina Turner	Sweet Rhode Island Red (1974)	2:30
17.	"Sexy Ida" (Part II)	Tina Turner	Sweet Rhode Island Red (1974)	3:01
18.	"It Ain't Right (Lovin' to Be Lovin')"	Ike Turner	Come Together (1970)	2:36
Total length:				57:09

Disc two – Rarities
No.	Title	Writer(s)	Original album	Length
1.	"Acid Queen" (Soundtrack version)	Pete Townshend	Tommy OST (1975)	3:48
2.	"Whole Lotta Love"	Robert Plant; Jimmy Page; John Bonham; John Paul Jones; Willie Dixon (Note: Dixon not credited on this release)	Acid Queen (1975)	4:43
3.	"Ball of Confusion (That's What the World Is Today)" (B.E.F. featuring Tina Turner) (1991 remix)	Norman Whitfield; Barrett Strong	Music of Quality and Distinction, Volume One (1982)	4:11
4.	"A Change Is Gonna Come" (B.E.F. featuring Tina Turner)	Sam Cooke	Music of Quality and Distinction, Volume Two (1991)	4:45
5.	"Johnny and Mary"	Robert Palmer	Summer Lovers OST (1982)	4:11
6.	"Games" (1983 demo recording)	Andrea Farber; Vince Melamed	Previously unreleased	4:16
7.	"When I Was Young"	Eric Burdon; Vic Briggs; John Weider; Barry Jenkins; Danny McCulloch (Note: Weider, Jenkins and McCulloch not credited on this release)	"Better Be Good to Me" single (1984)	3:12
8.	"Total Control"	Martha Davis; Jeff Jourard	We Are the World (1985)	6:28
9.	"Let's Pretend We're Married" (Live, Chicago 1984)	Prince	"I Can't Stand the Rain" single (1985)	4:16
10.	"It's Only Love" (Bryan Adams with Tina Turner)	Bryan Adams; Jim Vallance	Reckless (1984)	3:15
11.	"Don't Turn Around"	Diane Warren; Albert Hammond	"Typical Male" single (1986)	4:17
12.	"Legs" (Live, San Bernardino 1993)	Billy Gibbons; Dusty Hill; Frank Beard	Previously unreleased	4:59
13.	"Addicted to Love" (Live, London 1986)	Robert Palmer	Tina Live in Europe (1988)	5:24
14.	"Tearing Us Apart" (Eric Clapton and Tina Turner)	Eric Clapton; Greg Phillinganes	August (1986)	4:17
15.	"It Takes Two" (Rod Stewart and Tina Turner)	Sylvia Moy; William Stevenson	Vagabond Heart (1991)	4:12
Total length:				66:14

Disc three – Solo hits
No.	Title	Writer(s)	Original album	Length
1.	"Let's Stay Together"	Al Green; Willie Mitchell; Al Jackson Jr.	Private Dancer (1984)	5:17
2.	"What's Love Got to Do with It"	Terry Britten; Graham Lyle	Private Dancer (1984)	3:46
3.	"Better Be Good to Me"	Holly Knight; Nicky Chinn; Mike Chapman	Private Dancer (1984)	5:10
4.	"Private Dancer"	Mark Knopfler	Private Dancer (1984)	7:11
5.	"I Can't Stand the Rain"	Ann Peebles; Don Bryant; Bernard Miller	Private Dancer (1984)	3:43
6.	"Help!"	John Lennon; Paul McCartney	Private Dancer (1984)	4:30
7.	"We Don't Need Another Hero (Thunderdome)" (7" edit)	Terry Britten; Graham Lyle	Mad Max Beyond Thunderdome OST (1985)	4:15
8.	"Typical Male"	Terry Britten; Graham Lyle	Break Every Rule (1986)	4:15
9.	"What You Get Is What You See"	Terry Britten; Graham Lyle	Break Every Rule (1986)	4:27
10.	"Paradise Is Here"	Paul Brady	Break Every Rule (1986)	5:29
11.	"Back Where You Started"	Bryan Adams; Jim Vallance	Break Every Rule (1986)	4:27
12.	"The Best"	Mike Chapman; Holly Knight	Foreign Affair (1989)	5:29
13.	"Steamy Windows"	Tony Joe White	Foreign Affair (1989)	4:04
14.	"Foreign Affair"	Tony Joe White	Foreign Affair (1989)	4:28
15.	"I Don't Wanna Fight"	Steve DuBerry; Lulu; Billy Lawrie	What's Love Got to Do with It (1993)	6:05
Total length:				71:25

== Personnel ==
- Carter – executive producer
- Roger Davies – executive producer
- John Owen – boxset coordination
- Jeremy Hammond – boxset coordination
- Larry Walsh – digital remastered
- Larry Grein – liner notes
