= What's Love Got to Do with It (1993 film) =

1993 film by Brian Gibson

- Theatrical release poster
- Directed by: Brian Gibson
- Screenplay by: Kate Lanier
- Story by: Howard Ashman (uncredited)
- Based on: I, Tina by Tina Turner with Kurt Loder
- Produced by: Doug Chapin; Barry Krost
- Starring: Angela Bassett; Laurence Fishburne
- Cinematography: Jamie Anderson
- Edited by: Stuart Pappé
- Music by: Stanley Clarke
- Production company: Touchstone Pictures
- Distributed by: Buena Vista Pictures Distribution
- Release dates: June 6, 1993 (Los Angeles); June 25, 1993 (United States)
- Running time: 118 minutes
- Country: United States
- Language: English
- Budget: $15 million
- Box office: $61 million

What's Love Got to Do with It is a 1993 American biographical film based on the life of singer-songwriter Tina Turner. Directed by Brian Gibson and written by Kate Lanier from an uncredited story draft by the late Howard Ashman, based on Tina's 1986 autobiography I, Tina, it stars Angela Bassett as Tina and Laurence Fishburne as her abusive husband Ike Turner.

What's Love Got to Do with It premiered in Los Angeles on June 6, 1993, and was theatrically released by Touchstone Pictures on June 25, 1993. Although the Turners disapproved of its inaccuracies, the film was critically and commercially successful, grossing $61 million on a $15 million budget. For their performances, Bassett and Fishburne received nominations at the 66th Academy Awards for Best Actress and Best Actor. Bassett also won the Golden Globe Award for Best Actress – Motion Picture Comedy or Musical.

== Plot ==
Raised in Nutbush, Tennessee in the early 1950s, Anna Mae Bullock returns home from church one day to see her mother Zelma leaving and taking her elder sister Alline with her. She is distraught over this and is consoled by her grandmother Georgeanna. Six years later, a teenage Anna Mae relocates to St. Louis, where she reunites with her mother and Alline. While in St. Louis, Alline takes Anna to a nightclub at East St. Louis, where she sees bandleader Ike Turner perform with his band Kings of Rhythm. After nights of seeing women in the crowd coming onstage to sing with Ike, Anna finally gets her chance to perform for Ike and impresses him so much that he offers to mentor her and produce her music.

As the first frontwoman of Kings of Rhythm, along with the formation of a backing girl group (later known as the Ikettes), Anna develops a local popularity at the St. Louis club scene. The two record a hit song, "A Fool in Love" and develop a romance. Anna becomes pregnant with their son and learns, while in the hospital, that her name has changed to Tina Turner after the radio station announces the name "Ike & Tina Turner" following the playing of "A Fool in Love". The couple drives to Tijuana to get married and soon after the Ike & Tina Turner Revue becomes a national sensation and relocates to Los Angeles. Upon learning that Ike & Tina have moved to Los Angeles, Ike's ex-girlfriend Lorraine Taylor makes an unexpected visit to their new home and drops off their two sons, which further complicates matters at home.

One day while at home, Tina voices her opinion that Ike's music "all sounds the same", which leads to Ike beating her in front of their sons. Following a performance on a teen rock and roll show in 1966, Tina is offered a solo deal with Phil Spector for the song, "River Deep – Mountain High". Following the release of the song, the duo open for the Rolling Stones in London and find success with their recording of "Proud Mary", which transforms the Revue from a national R&B phenomenon to an international sensation. Over time, crowds begin clamoring more to Tina than Ike, which causes further tension as Ike discovers cocaine.

During one recording session of the song, "Nutbush City Limits" in 1973, an addicted Ike violently rapes Tina in their home recording studio for not singing the song to his satisfaction, blaming her for the duo's issues in following their previous hits. Feeling hopeless, Tina attempts suicide by consuming a whole bottle of sleeping pills before a show and is rushed to a hospital where she recovers. Tina eventually visits a friend, a former Ikette, who convinces her to practice Buddhism and the chant Nam-Myoho-Renge-Kyo which leads Tina to acquire a newfound strength. Then, in 1976, while en route to a show in Dallas, a fed-up Tina begins to annoy Ike and they get into a physical altercation in a limousine on their way to a hotel. Upon their arrival, Ike falls asleep and Tina flees, running across a freeway to the Ramada Inn where she finds refuge. Tina later files for divorce and in the final matter, she agrees to give up everything except her stage name.

In 1980, Tina begins rebuilding her career at the cabaret circuit and invites a young impresario named Roger Davies to see her perform so he could manage her and help her realize her dreams as a rock star. Impressed that she could still perform, Davies agrees to manage her. Still, the presence of Ike threatens to derail her chances. Turning to her Buddhist faith, she prepares for a show at the Ritz Theatre in 1983 where Ike confronts her in her dressing room armed with a gun. Undeterred, Tina verbally silences him and leaves the dressing room where she dazzles the audience at the Ritz with her new hit single, "What's Love Got to Do with It", where she eventually realizes her dream of being a rock superstar.

== Cast ==
- Angela Bassett as Tina Turner, born Anna Mae Bullock
  - Rae'Ven Larrymore Kelly as young Anna Mae
- Cora Lee Day as Grandma Georgiana
- Khandi Alexander as Darlene
- Laurence Fishburne as Ike Turner
- Jenifer Lewis as Zelma Bullock, Tina's mother
- Phyllis Yvonne Stickney as Alline Bullock
- Penny Johnson Jerald as Lorraine Taylor
- Vanessa Bell Calloway as Jackie
- Chi McBride as Fross
- Sherman Augustus as Reggie
- Terrence Riggins as Spider
- Bo Kane as Dick Clark
- Terrence Evans as Bus Driver
- Rob LaBelle as Phil Spector
- James Reyne as Roger Davies
- Richard T. Jones as Ike Turner Jr.
- Shavar Ross as Michael Turner
- Damon Hines as Ronnie Turner
- Suli McCullough as Craig Turner
- Elijah B. Saleem as teenage Ike Turner Jr.

== Production ==
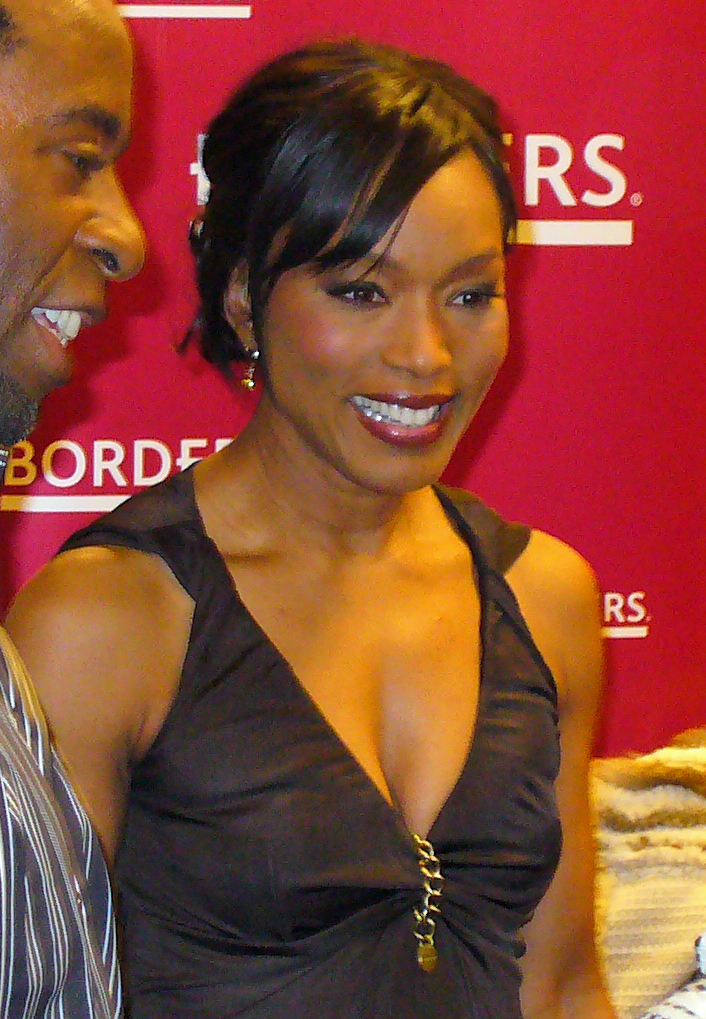
Angela Bassett portrayed the American singer-songwriter Tina Turner in the film.

Taylor Hackford was originally slated to direct; however, Hackford would later be replaced by Mario Van Peebles, who also wanted to play Ike Turner. Van Peebles left the project to direct Posse (1993). Touchstone Pictures offered the film to Brian Gibson, who was about to direct The Thing Called Love (1993) for Paramount Pictures. Gibson choose to helm the Touchstone project due to a more profitable pay-or-play deal which Paramount failed to match.

Halle Berry, Robin Givens, Pam Grier, Whitney Houston, Janet Jackson and Vanessa L. Williams were all considered for the lead role. Houston was actually offered the role, but had to decline due to imminent maternity. Jenifer Lewis also originally auditioned to play Turner but was cast instead as Turner's mother, despite being only a year older than Bassett.

Angela Bassett auditioned in October 1992 and was chosen only a month before production began in December. During that time, she had to learn not only how to talk like Turner but to dance and move like her. She would have been willing to try to do the singing as well, but "not in the time we had," she said. "I did think about it for a second, though." Instead, she lipsynced to soundtracks recorded by Turner and Fishburne. Bassett worked with Turner, but only "a little bit". Turner helped most with the re-creations of her famed dance routines. She also re-recorded new versions of all the songs used in the film.

Laurence Fishburne was offered the role of Ike five times and turned it down each time. "It was pretty one-sided," said Fishburne, who turned down the project based on the script he first read. Ike, Fishburne added, was "obviously the villain of the piece, but there was no explanation as to why he behaved the way he behaved - why she was with him for 16 to 20 years, what made her stay." The writers made some changes and though Ike is still shown as a pretty despicable sort, the film offers at least some insight into him - most notably, a scene in which Ike recalls watching, at age 6, his father's death from wounds suffered in a fight over a woman. The changes helped persuade Fishburne to do the role, but he says that Bassett's casting as Tina "was the deciding factor."

Fishburne did not have Ike around to help model his performance as much as he would have liked. He met him once during production. "He was not particularly welcome on this project," Fishburne says. The actor's only meeting was a brief introduction when Ike showed up at the Turners' former home in View Park during a location shoot. Ike signed some autographs and showed Fishburne his walk. "It was nice to meet him," says Fishburne. "Regardless of his actions, he was so much a part of Tina's life. The movie is about him just as much as her. It's unfortunate that he wasn't welcomed, that both of them weren't around more." Director Gibson had no contact with Ike. "I never spoke to him," says Gibson. "I was not allowed to. Disney felt that it would not be a good idea."

Screenwriter Kate Lanier omitted much of the brutality Turner said she endured in her book. Her character was also sanitized; most notably, her relationship with saxophonist Raymond Hill and the birth of their son was excluded from the film. Lanier admitted that Tina Turner was not happy with certain aspects of the film because some parts were fictionalized. Tina Turner tried to talk to the Disney filmmakers about the script. In 1993, she told Vanity Fair that they saw "a deep need" to make a film about "a woman who was a victim to a con man. How weak! How shallow! How dare you think that was what I was? I was in control every minute there. I was there because I wanted to be, because I had promised." She added, "O.K. so if I was a victim, fine. Maybe I was a victim for a short while. But give me credit for thinking the whole time I was there. See, I do have pride."

Ike and Tina Turner's biological son Ronnie would also made a cameo in the film, despite being estranged from Tina and not receiving financial support from her by 1986.

== Historical accuracy ==
Although the film was adapted from Tina Turner's autobiography I, Tina, elements of the script were "fictionalized for dramatic purposes".

- Ike did not sing or play guitar on the record "Rocket 88" as depicted in the film. He wrote the song and played piano on the record. His saxophonist Jackie Brenston was the vocalist. The record was released under the alias Jackie Brenston and his Delta Cats who were actually Ike's band the Kings of Rhythm.
- The song Anna Mae first performs onstage with Ike, "You Know I Love You", was actually a slower B.B. King blues ballad; Ike played piano on King's record. When Anna Mae sang the song, Ike played the organ, not the guitar as depicted in the film. Tina recorded a blues rock rendition of the song for the film's soundtrack.
- Anna Mae and Ike did not have sex the night his live-in girlfriend Lorraine Taylor shot herself as depicted. In reality, when Anna Mae was pregnant in 1958, Lorraine pulled a gun on her before shooting herself because she believed that Anna Mae and Ike were having an affair. However, Anna Mae and Ike were platonic friends until 1960 when she went to sleep in his bed after a musician threatened to come into her room.
- The first song Anna Mae is portrayed recording, "Tina's Wish", is actually a 1973 track titled "Make Me Over" from the album Nutbush City Limits. In reality, the first song she recorded is "Boxtop" in 1958.
- A theater marquee is shown for a 1960 show starring Otis Redding, Martha and the Vandellas, and Ike & Tina Turner. In reality, Martha and the Vandellas were known as The Del-Phis until 1961, and Otis Redding did not release his first solo single until 1962.
- In the film, Anna Mae learns of her name change to Tina Turner after her song is played on a radio in the hospital where she had given birth. In reality, Ike & Tina Turner's debut single "A Fool In Love" was released in August 1960, months before she gave birth to their son.
- In real life, Ike did not call her Anna Mae, he called her either Ann or "Bo" (short for her surname Bullock). Even after she received the stage name Tina Turner, family and friends still called her Ann.
- The film implies that Tina's eldest child, Craig Raymond (born Raymond Craig in 1958), is Ike's biological son. In reality, his biological father was saxophonist Raymond Hill and Ike later adopted him. Tina and Ike have one biological child, Ronald "Ronnie" Renelle, born in 1960.
- The film depicts Ike and his entourage sneaking Tina out of the hospital after she gave birth to get married. In reality, Ike was not present for the birth of their son Ronnie. Tina wrote in her book that a few days after she checked herself out of the hospital, she discovered that the woman Ike hired to replace her while she recuperated was a sex worker using her stage name Tina Turner to get clients. She confronted the woman and after they got into a fight, Tina performed a show that night. Ike wrote in his book Takin' Back My Name that he was unaware the woman was a sex worker. He was out of town to attend a court hearing in St. Louis when Tina gave birth in Los Angeles. They married in 1962, two years after the birth of their son.
- Lorraine Taylor, the mother of Ike's sons Ike Junior and Michael, did not drop them off at his home with Tina as depicted in the film. In reality, Ike went to St. Louis and brought his sons to Los Angeles after Lorraine informed him she was going to leave them there. Tina also brought her son Craig to live with them.
- In a scene dated 1968, Ike and Tina open for the Rolling Stones performing "Proud Mary". In reality, Ike and Tina did not perform "Proud Mary" until after it was released by Creedence Clearwater Revival in 1969. The Rolling Stones did not have any concerts in 1968; Ike and Tina opened for them on their 1966 British Tour and 1969 American Tour.
- Jackie and Fross are both fictional characters. Jackie represents an amalgamation of Ikettes and associates of Tina, one of whom was Ike's friend Valerie Bishop who introduced Tina to Buddhism in 1973.
- The infamous "eat the cake Anna Mae" scene was an exaggerated reenactment of an incident that occurred during the early years of the revue. Tina recalled that when they stopped to order food, someone brought her a pound cake while they were sitting in a car. Although Tina said she did not order it, Ike ordered her to eat all of it while he watched.
- The scene where Tina was raped during the recording of "Nutbush City Limits" was exaggerated from what she stated in her book. Tina claimed that sometimes after Ike would hit her, he then would have sex with her. Ike maintained that he never raped Tina. "Nutbush City Limits" was recorded at their Bolic Sound recording studio, not at home as depicted in the film.
- The film depicts Tina's suicide attempt in 1974 when it actually occurred six years prior in 1968.
- Ike did not tell Tina "if you don't make it, I'll kill you" as depicted in the ambulance scene. Tina stated in her book that after her suicide attempt she joked with a friend that she was so afraid of Ike, he probably threatened her which is why she survived. She was unconscious and did not know what he actually said. Ike stated in his book that he scolded Tina as his way of motivating her to fight for her life.
- During the time Tina is planning her comeback in the early 1980s, a reenactment of an interview features Tina rehearsing her song "I Might Have Been Queen". The song would be recorded for her 1984 comeback album, Private Dancer.
- The incident in the Ritz Theatre where Ike fails to scare Tina with his pistol is fabricated. Allegedly, Ike made threats to hire a hitman, so Tina carried a pistol, but he did not threaten her in person with a gun as depicted.
- Before performing "What's Love Got to Do with It" at the Ritz in 1983, the emcee announces that it was her "first solo appearance", but she first performed there in 1981. Her 1983 performance there occurred before the recording of "What's Love Got to Do with It" and led to Capitol Records signing a contract with her.
- A title card at the end states that Tina's first solo album won four Grammy Awards, implying it was Private Dancer. In reality that album was her fifth solo album. Her first two solo albums (Tina Turns the Country On! and Acid Queen) were released while she was still with Ike, and two (Rough and Love Explosion) were released after.

== Reception ==
=== Critical reception ===
What's Love Got to Do with It received widespread critical acclaim. On the review aggregator website Rotten Tomatoes, the film has an approval rating of 97% based on 59 reviews, with an average rating of 7.6/10. The site's consensus is: "With a fascinating real-life story and powerhouse performances from Angela Bassett and Laurence Fishburne, What's Love Got to Do with It is a can't miss biopic." Metacritic, which assigns a weighted average to critics' reviews, gave the film an average score of 76 out of 100 based on 26 critics, indicating "generally favorable reviews". Audiences polled by CinemaScore gave the film an average grade of "A" on an A+ to F scale.

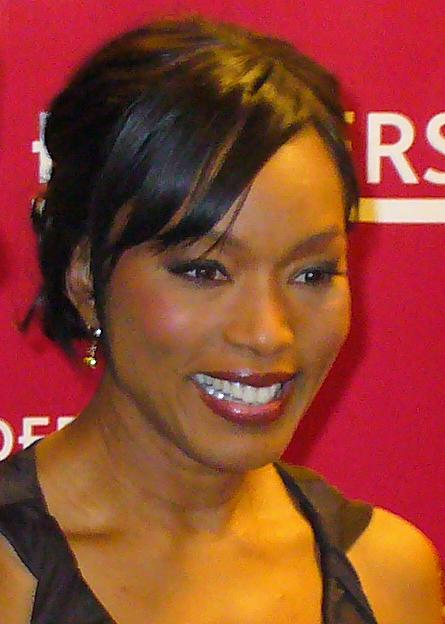
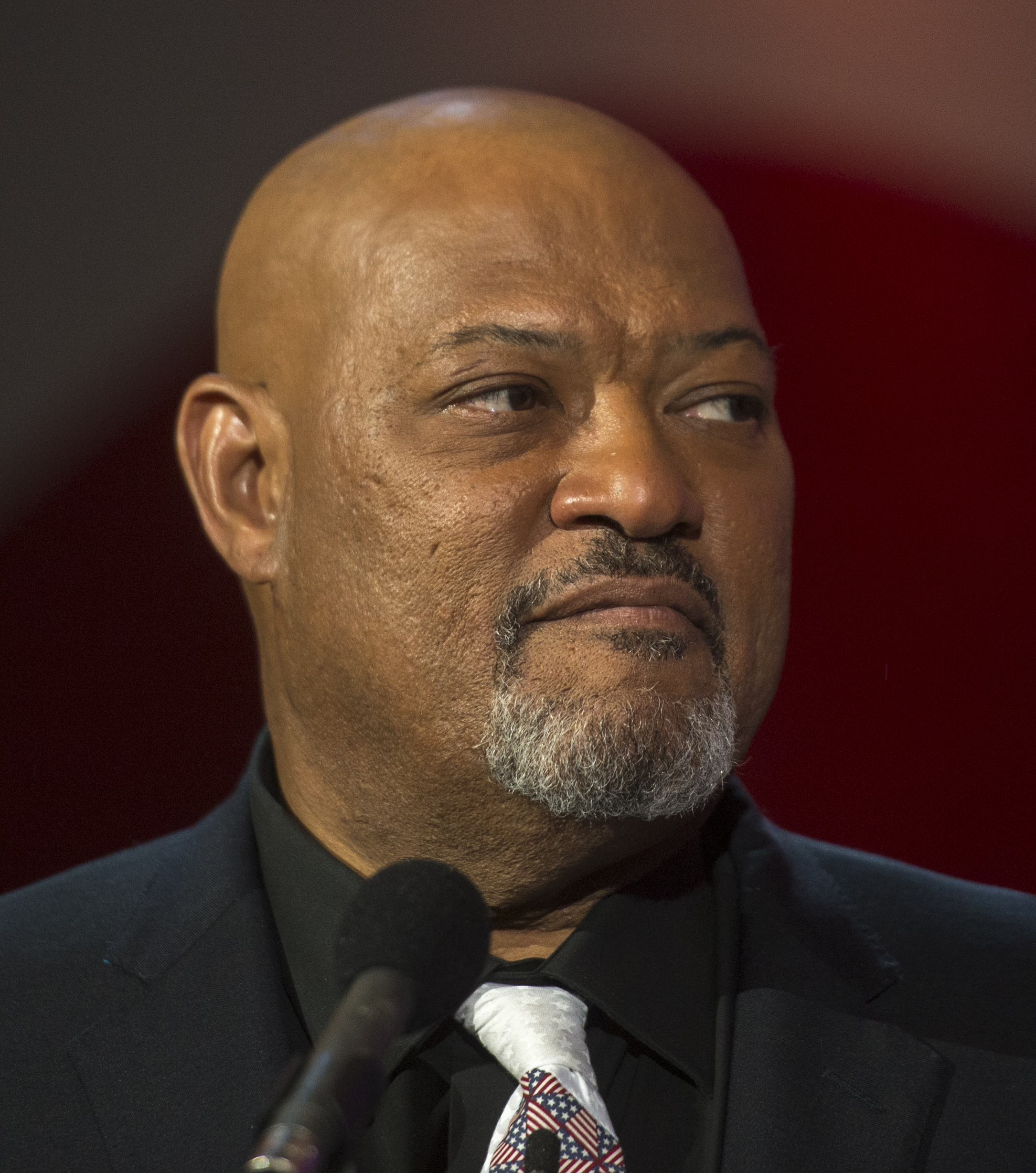
The performances of Angela Bassett and Laurence Fishburne garnered widespread critical acclaim, earning them Academy Award nominations for Best Actress and Best Actor respectively.

Janet Maslin of The New York Times wrote: "The brilliant, mercurial portrayal of Ike Turner by Laurence Fishburne, formerly known as Larry, is what elevates What's Love Got to Do With It beyond the realm of run-of-the-mill biography." Gene Siskel of the Chicago Tribune gave it a score of four out of four, calling it, "A powerful, joyful, raw, energetically acted bio-pic detailing the joys and pain of the on- and offstage lives of blues rockers Ike and Tina Turner."

=== Responses by Tina and Ike ===
Tina Turner stated she wished the film had not portrayed her as a "victim". In 2018, Turner told Oprah Winfrey that she had only recently watched the film. She said, "I watched a little bit of it, but I didn't finish it because that was not how things went. Oprah, I didn't realize they would change the details so much." Despite her disapproval of elements of the film, Turner heavily praised Bassett's portrayal of her. When Bassett was named one of Time's 100 most influential people in 2023, Turner wrote of Bassett's portrayal of her in What's Love Got to Do With It: "Angela, the first time we met, you didn't look, sound, or move like me—that came later after you worked so hard to make it happen. But even then, I could see that the young woman standing before me had strength, determination, and big, big dreams, just like me. 'She's perfect,' I said, and I was right. You never mimicked me. Instead, you reached deep into your soul, found your inner Tina, and showed her to the world."

Ike Turner said that the film and Tina Turner's book are "filled with lies". In his autobiography, Takin' Back My Name, he said Fishburne did "a fantastic job, though the job he did isn't really me". He also stated he was upset about the rape scene, which he claimed was fabricated and "was the lowest thing they could have ever done". He added that the film damaged his reputation.

=== Box office ===
The film grossed $40.1 million in the United States and Canada and $20.5 million internationally for a worldwide total of $60.6 million.

=== Awards ===
Award	Category	Nominee(s)	Result
Academy Awards	Best Actor	Laurence Fishburne	Nominated
Academy Awards	Best Actress	Angela Bassett	Nominated
American Choreography Awards	Outstanding Achievement in Feature Film	Michael Peters	Won (Note: Tied with Otis Sallid for Swing Kids.)
Artios Awards	Best Casting for Feature Film – Drama	Reuben Cannon	Nominated
Brit Awards	Best Soundtrack/Cast Recording	What's Love Got to Do with It	Nominated
Chicago Film Critics Association Awards	Best Actor	Laurence Fishburne	Nominated
Chicago Film Critics Association Awards	Best Actress	Angela Bassett	Nominated
Dallas–Fort Worth Film Critics Association Awards	Best Actress	Angela Bassett	Nominated
Golden Globe Awards	Best Actress in a Motion Picture – Musical or Comedy	Angela Bassett	Won
Grammy Awards	Best Female Pop Vocal Performance	"I Don't Wanna Fight" – Tina Turner	Nominated
Grammy Awards	Best Song Written Specifically for a Motion Picture or for Television	"I Don't Wanna Fight" – Steve DuBerry, Lulu Lawrie & Billy Lawrie (songwriters)	Nominated
MTV Movie Awards	Best Female Performance	Angela Bassett	Nominated
NAACP Image Awards	Outstanding Actor in a Motion Picture	Laurence Fishburne	Nominated
NAACP Image Awards	Outstanding Actress in a Motion Picture	Angela Bassett	Won
NAACP Image Awards	Outstanding Supporting Actress in a Motion Picture	Vanessa Bell Calloway	Nominated
NAACP Image Awards	Outstanding Supporting Actress in a Motion Picture	Jenifer Lewis	Nominated
Young Artist Awards	Best Youth Actress Co-Starring in a Motion Picture – Drama	Rae'Ven Larrymore Kelly	Nominated

=== American Film Institute ===
The film is recognized by American Film Institute in these lists:

- 2006: AFI's 100 Years...100 Cheers – #85

=== Top lists ===
- Ranked #1 on Favorite Movie of the Year in 1994 by Ebony Readers' Poll
- Ranked #2 on Top 9 Subjects of a Music Bio-Pic by Entertainment Weekly
- Ranked #8 on Top 10 Best Rock Biopics by Rolling Stone Readers' Poll
- Ranked #9 on The Best Black Movies of the Last 30 Years By Complex
