= Ike & Tina Turner's Festival of Live Performances =

Live album by Ike & Tina Turner
- Released: January 1970
- Recorded: c. 1964–1965
- Label: Kent Records

Ike & Tina Turner chronology
The Hunter (1969)	Ike & Tina Turner's Festival of Live Performances (1970)	Come Together (1970)

Ike & Tina Turner's Festival of Live Performances is a live album released by Kent Records in January 1970. It was recorded during their stint at Kent in the mid-1960s.

== Background ==
At the time of the recording Ike & Tina Turner were touring vigorously on the Chitlin Circuit. They already had a string of hits by 1962, and simultaneously they were establishing themselves as "one of the most potent live acts on the R&B circuit." They released various live albums in the 1960s which did better on the charts than their studio albums. Opening for the Rolling Stones on their 1969 American tour helped sell the duo to a major market. After they achieved mainstream success, Kent Records, one of the many labels they recorded for in the 1960s released Ike & Tina Turner's Festival of Live Performances in 1970.

== Critical reception ==
Professional ratings
Review scores
Source	Rating
Allmusic	4.5/5 stars

Billboard (February 21, 1970):

The husband-wife soul duo of Ike & Tina Turner are everyday these days, especially on the charts where their incredible brand of pop-soul excitement has finally been realized after years as also-rans. Their live performances at the Fillmore and Madison Square Garden did the trick, but Kent presents the team as they were when 'live' meant clubs and smaller audiences of devoted fans.

Record World (February 28, 1970): "After paying their dues, and it was a large amount, Ike and Tina are finally full-fledged members of the hot artist organization. All these sides were recorded live and some will say that's the only way to enjoy the sizzling duo and their Ikettes."

Ron Wynn at AllMusic stated that "they were still a hungry, eager, galvanizing band then, and even performed with energy and fire on mundane filler."

== Reissues ==
The album was reissued in France by Disques Festival on the double vinyl The Great Album Of Ike And Tina Turner in 1974.

Ike & Tina Turner's Festival of Live Performances was reissued on CD by RockBeat Records in 2011 with two additional tracks.

== Track listing ==
Side A
No.	Title	Writer(s)	Length
1.	"A Fool in Love"	Ike Turner	2:29
2.	"He's Mine"	Ike Turner	3:45
3.	"Stop the Wedding"/"Please, Please, Please"	Freddy Johnson, Leroy Kirkland, Peal Woods/James Brown, Johnny Terry	8:33
4.	"If I Can't Be First"	Ike Turner	2:29

Side B
No.	Title	Writer(s)	Length
1.	"My Man"	James Bennett, Johnnie Mae Matthews	3:32
2.	"You Don't Love Me No More"	Barbara George	3:23
3.	"It's Gonna Work Out Fine"	Sylvia McKinney, Rose Marie McCoy	2:32
4.	"The Way You Love Me"	Ike Turner	1:47
5.	"I Can't Stop Loving You"	Ike Turner	3:30
6.	"You Should Have Treated Me Right"	Ike Turner	3:21
