= Acid Queen =

Studio album by Tina Turner
- Released: August 1975
- Recorded: 1975
- Studio: Bolic Sound, Inglewood, California
- Genre: Rock; soul
- Length: 35:29
- Label: United Artists; EMI
- Producer: Denny Diante; Spencer Proffer

Tina Turner chronology
Tina Turns the Country On! (1974)	Acid Queen (1975)	Rough (1978)

Alternative covers
- 2005 re-release cover art

Singles from Acid Queen
- 1. "Baby, Get It On" Released: April 1975; 2. "Whole Lotta Love" Released: 1975; 3. "Acid Queen" Released: 1976; 4. "Under My Thumb" Released: 1977

Professional ratings
Review scores
Source	Rating
AllMusic	3/5 stars
Christgau's Record Guide	B

Acid Queen is the second solo studio album by Tina Turner. It was released in 1975 on the EMI label in the UK and on United Artists in the US. Although it is a Tina Turner solo album, the first single, "Baby, Get It On", was a duet with Ike Turner, her musical partner and husband at the time. Acid Queen was her last solo album before their separation and her departure from Ike & Tina Turner Revue.

== Background and songs ==
The Acid Queen album was inspired by Tina Turner's role as the Acid Queen in Ken Russell's film version of The Who's classic rock opera Tommy, which also featured Elton John, Eric Clapton, Jack Nicholson, Ann-Margret, and starred Roger Daltrey.

Side A of the album consists of rock covers. In addition to a re-recorded version of the title track, it also contained the Rolling Stones' "Under My Thumb" and "Let's Spend the Night Together", The Who's "I Can See for Miles" and Led Zeppelin's "Whole Lotta Love". Turner recorded two different versions of "Acid Queen", one for the Tommy soundtrack produced by The Who and the other for her album produced by Denny Diante and Spencer Proffer.

Side B was written and produced mainly by Ike Turner. It includes Ike & Tina Turner's last single together, the disco-influenced "Baby, Get It On" (No. 88 Pop, No. 31 R&B). Other singles include "Whole Lotta Love" (No. 61 R&B) released in 1975, and "Acid Queen" released in the UK in 1976. The track "Under My Thumb" was released as a single in Australia to promote Turner's tour, reaching No. 80 in 1977.

== Release and reissues ==
Acid Queen was released in August 1975, peaking at No. 155 on the Billboard 200 and No. 39 on the R&B albums chart. It has since been re-issued on both vinyl and CD with a series of different cover pictures by both EMI Music and its Dutch midprice subsidiary Disky Communications. The first release of the album on CD included three "bonus" tracks taken from the 1969 Ike & Tina Turner albums The Hunter and Outta Season. In November 2023, the album was made available on streaming services and as a digital download, marking its first release in any digital format.

The album was re-issued on LP and CD on November 15, 2024.

== Critical reception ==
Billboard gave the album a positive review, noting the "strong production from Denny Diante, Spencer Proffer (and Ike on side two)....Ms. Turner's gruff vocals are perfect for the raucous British material she has chosen, while side two, though soul oriented, should also reach the pop fans with its strong Sid Sharp string arrangements." By contrast, Dave Marsh of Rolling Stone criticized the album. He stated, "The primary flaw in the rock-classics side of Acid Queen rests not with the singer but with her producers, Denny Diante and Spencer Proffer. The arrangements here are the opposite of what seems sensible," adding that the "material also seems ill-chosen."

Reviewing Acid Queen in Christgau's Record Guide: Rock Albums of the Seventies (1981), Robert Christgau said: "Her rock myth reconfirmed cinematically, Tina quickly turns out two from the Who (only fair), two from the Stones (who else?), and one from Led Zep ('Whole Lotta Love,' brilliant, I trust R. Plant has his big twelve-inch in a sling at this very moment). With bass lines lifted whole from the originals the singing almost doesn't matter. And what rocks most mythically? I. Turner's cleverly entitled 'Baby—Get It On.'"

Reviewing the album for AllMusic, Rob Theakston wrote: "Acid Queen is thus an immensely enjoyable affair from start to finish. Her version of Led Zep's 'Whole Lotta Love' takes the dynamics of the original and turns them upside down to deliver an affair that is on par with some of Isaac Hayes' finest moments.

== Track listing ==
Side A
No.	Title	Writer(s)	Length
1.	"Under My Thumb"	Mick Jagger; Keith Richards	3:22
2.	"Let's Spend the Night Together"	Jagger; Richards	2:54
3.	"Acid Queen"	Pete Townshend	3:01
4.	"I Can See for Miles"	Townshend	2:53
5.	"Whole Lotta Love"	John Bonham; Willie Dixon; John Paul Jones; Jimmy Page; Robert Plant	5:24

Side B
No.	Title	Writer(s)	Length
6.	"Baby, Get It On" (Ike & Tina Turner)	Ike Turner	5:34
7.	"Bootsey Whitelaw"	Turner	5:06
8.	"Pick Me Tonight"	Turner	3:13
9.	"Rockin' and Rollin'"	Turner	4:02

1991 CD release bonus tracks
No.	Title	Writer(s)	Length
10.	"I Know" (Ike & Tina Turner)	Barbara George	3:22
11.	"Crazy 'Bout You Baby" (Ike & Tina Turner)	Sonny Boy Williamson II	3:26
12.	"I've Been Loving You Too Long" (Ike & Tina Turner)	Otis Redding; Jerry Butler	3:55

== Personnel ==
- Tina Turner – lead vocals
- Ike Turner – co-lead vocals on "Baby Get It On", producer (Side B), arranger
- Ed Greene – drums
- Henry Davis – bass guitar
- Ray Parker Jr. – guitar
- Spencer Proffer – guitar, producer (tracks: A1–A5, B1–B4), arranger
- Jerry Peters, Clarence McDonald – keyboards
- Jeffrey Marmelzat – keyboards, arranger
- Joe Clayton – congas
- Alan Lindgren – ARP, synthesizer, string ensemble
- Jimmie Haskell – ARP, synthesizer, orchestration, producer (tracks: B2–B4), string and horn arrangements
- The Sid Sharp Strings – strings
- Tom Scott – saxophone, flute
- Plas Johnson, Bill Perkins – saxophone
- Lew McCreary – trombone
- Tony Terran, Charles Findley – trumpet
- Julia Tillman Waters, Kim Carnes, Maxine Willard Waters – backing vocals
- Denny Diante – producer (tracks A1–A5, B1–B4), arranger, percussion
- Ron Malo – recording, mixing

== Chart performance ==
Chart performance for Acid Queen
Chart (1975)	Peak position
Australian Albums (Kent Music Report)	75
US Billboard Top LPs & Tape	155
US Billboard Soul LPs	39
US Cash Box Top Albums 101–200	119
US Record World Albums 101–150	139
