= Bold Soul Sister =

Single by Ike & Tina Turner

from the album The Hunter
- A-side: "I Know"
- Released: October 1969
- Genre: Soul, R&B, funk rock
- Label: Blue Thumb
- Songwriters: Ike Turner, Tina Turner (uncredited)
- Producers: Bob Krasnow and Friends

Ike & Tina Turner singles chronology
"River Deep – Mountain High" (1969 reissue)	"Bold Soul Sister" (1969)	"I Wanna Jump" (1969)

"Bold Soul Sister" is a song by R&B duo Ike & Tina Turner from the album The Hunter. The song features electric blues guitarist Albert Collins. It was released as the B-side to the single "I Know" in October 1969.

== Recording and release ==
In 1969, Ike Turner recruited Albert Collins to add his blues guitar work on The Hunter album. Collins recalled, "I did 'Bold Soul Sister' for him and I did The Hunter album with Tina. Ike was playing piano." Collins is not credited on the album because he was signed to Imperial Records and Ike wanted to avoid litigation. Collins stated: "He just paid me for the session, did it in about six hours. Tina already had the material. I just went right on and played in the studio, no overdubbing at all. It was just a straight session. I took the main guitar work all the way through and Ike took the piano."

"Bold Soul Sister" was released as the B-side to the single "I Know," a cover song by Barbara George. It was the second single from the album, and was expected to do well on the charts, but it didn't reach the Billboard Hot 100 chart, peaking at No. 126 on Bubbling Under The Hot 100. Ike and Tina had previously performed "I Know" in their concerts, and released a version on the album Live!The Ike & Tina Turner Show (1965). They later released different versions on the albums Sweet Rhode Island Red (1974) and Golden Empire (1985).

In contrast to the A-side, "Bold Soul Sister" entered the charts in December 1969. Ike and Tina promoted it on The Ed Sullivan Show in January 1970 which propelled the single to No. 59 on the Hot 100 and No. 22 on the R&B chart.

== Critical reception ==
The single, particularly the A-side "I Know," received positive reviews.

Billboard (October 4, 1969): "The dynamic duo had a chart winner with 'The Hunter' and 'I've Been Loving You Too Long,' and this blockbuster updating of the Barbara George hit will surpass both of those hits on both the soul and Hot 100 charts."

== Track listing ==
No.	Title	Writer(s)	Length
1.	"I Know"	Barbara George	2:30
2.	"Bold Soul Sister"	Ike Turner, Tina Turner (uncredited)	2:35

== Chart performance ==
Chart (1970)	Peak position
US Billboard Hot 100	59
US Billboard Soul Singles	22
US Cash Box Top 100	74
US Cash Box R&B Top 50	16
US Record World 100 Top Pops	54
US Record World Top 50 R&B	13
