= Cussin', Cryin' & Carryin' On =

Studio album by Ike & Tina Turner
- Released: July 1969
- Genre: R&B; soul; funk rock
- Label: Pompeii Records
- Producer: Ike Turner

Ike & Tina Turner chronology
In Person (1969)	Cussin', Cryin' & Carryin' On (1969)	River Deep – Mountain High (1969 reissue)

Singles from Cussin', Cryin' & Carryin' On
- 1. "Make 'Em Wait" Released: November 1968; 2. "You Got What You Wanted" Released: November 1968; 3. "Cussin', Cryin' & Carryin' On" Released: June 1969; 4. "Poor Little Fool" Released: November 1969

Cussin', Cryin' & Carryin' On is a studio album by R&B duo Ike & Tina Turner. It was released on Pompeii Records in 1969.

== Recording and release ==
The album contains a few songs from previously released albums in addition to songs from the Ikettes. Two tracks are from Ike Turner's instrumental album A Black Man's Soul. The track "I Better Get Ta Steppin'" was a previous single included on the 1968 album So Fine. The song "Poor Little Fool" by Fontella Bass was originally released as a single in 1964 on Turner's Sonja label. He played guitar on the track and Tina Turner provided vocals.

The first single, "Make 'Em Wait" by the Ikettes, was released in November 1968. That same month, "You Got What You Wanted" was released. It is credited to Tina Turner with Ike Turner & The Kings of Rhythm. They performed this song on The Hollywood Palace in December 1968. The third single, "Cussin', Cryin' & Carryin' On," was released in June 1969. "Poor Little Fool" was reissued as a single on the Pompeii's subsidiary label Vesuvius in November 1969.

== Critical reception ==
Professional ratings
Review scores
Source	Rating
Allmusic	3.5/5 stars

The album received positive reviews.

Record World (August 2, 1969): "Titled after their recent single click for this label, the dynamite duo are together as ever on this collection of soul tunes the way only these two can do them. Ike contributes material like 'So Blue Over You,' 'I'm Fed Up' and 'Make 'Em Wait,' and it all moves."

Billboard (August 2, 1969):

Ike & Tina Turner, enjoying competitive sales from the many labels with rights to their recordings, add some Pompeii product to the sweepstakes and bid for a solid position on the charts. By far the best of the lot, Pompeii's contribution features the dynamic singing and instrumental soul duo in a committed r&b performance that sparkles with fine production from Ike Turner. Tina is powerful and persuasive in the title tune, plus "Poor Little Fool" and "You Got What You Wanted."

== Reissues ==
Cussin', Cryin' & Carryin' On was reissued by Bellaphon Records in Germany.

Most of the album (excluding tracks by the Ikettes) with additional tracks from So Fine and Ike's instrumental album A Black Man's Soul were reissued on a CD titled Cussin', Cryin' & Carryin' On by Starburst in 1998. It was also reissued by Synergie OMP in 2006.

The album is included in the box set The Complete Pompeii Recordings released from Goldenlane Records in 2016.

== Track listing ==
Side A
No.	Title	Writer(s)	Length
1.	"Cussin', Cryin' & Carryin' On"	Wayne Carson Thompson	2:39
2.	"Poor Little Fool" (Lead vocals by Fontella Bass & Tina Turner)	Oliver Sain	2:47
3.	"So Blue Over You" (Lead vocals by the Ikettes)	Ike Turner	2:32
4.	"Nothing You Can Do Boy (To Change My Way)"	Ike Turner	2:27
5.	"I'm Fed Up"	Ike Turner	2:14
6.	"You Got What You Wanted"	Wayne Carson Thompson	2:25

Side B
No.	Title	Writer(s)	Length
1.	"Make 'Em Wait" (Lead vocals by the Ikettes)	Ike Turner	2:18
2.	"Beauty Is Just Skin Deep" (Lead vocals by the Ikettes)	Steve Venet, Toni Wine	2:14
3.	"Thinking Black" (Instrumental)	Ike Turner	2:40
4.	"Black Beauty" (Instrumental)	Ike Turner	2:30
5.	"I Better Get Ta Steppin'"	Charles Harris	2:50
