= The Hunter (Ike & Tina Turner album) =

Studio album by Ike & Tina Turner
- Released: October 1969
- Genre: Blues rock
- Label: Blue Thumb
- Producer: Bob Krasnow (with a lot of help from my friends)

Ike & Tina Turner chronology
River Deep – Mountain High (1969 reissue)	The Hunter (1969)	Ike & Tina Turner's Festival of Live Performances (1970)

Singles from The Hunter
- 1. "The Hunter" Released: June 1969; 2. "I Know" Released: October 1969; 3. "You Don't Love Me (Yes I Know)" Released: 1971

The Hunter is a studio album by Ike & Tina Turner released on Blue Thumb Records in 1969.

== Recording and release ==
The Hunter is one of their most blues-oriented albums which came during the blues revival period of the late 1960s. The title track is an Albert King song, and the album was recorded with electric blues guitarist Albert Collins. Collins played on the track "Bold Soul Sister." Collins was not credited on the album to avoid a possible conflict of interest lawsuit because he was signed to Imperial Records.

"The Hunter" was the lead single, released in June 1969. It reached No. 37 in the Billboard R&B Singles chart and No. 93 in the Billboard Hot 100 chart. The second single "I Know" missed the Hot 100 chart at No. 126. However, the B-side "Bold Soul Sister" charted at No. 59 on the Hot 100 and No. 22 on the R&B chart. The album peaked at No. 176 in the Billboard Top LPs and No. 49 on the Billboard R&B albums chart. In 1971, after Ike and Tina had left the Blue thumb label a third single "You Don't Love Me (Yes I Know)" was released in France.

== Critical reception ==
Professional ratings
Review scores
Source	Rating
Allmusic	3/5 stars

Record World (October 18, 1969): "The latest Ike and Tina Turner album is here and it contains Tina's version of the Barbara George oldie, 'I Know.' As usual, plenty of driving blues in the grooves. Tina lets herself go to pieces and crowds will love it."

Cash Box (October 18, 1969):

Ike & Tina Turner had a noisemaker with their single, "The Hunter," and a 6 minute, 30 second version of the song leads off this powerhouse album, which should hit the Top 100 Albums. The two soul singers really sock it to the listener on this one, and they should reap a reward equal to their talents. "The Hunter" is an album to stock.

Billboard (October 18, 1969):

Blue Thumb's Outta Season LP brought the much-recorded duo high and heavy on the charts, and their latest, featuring "I Know," should outrace all competitors for the Ike & Tina Turner laurels. Bob Krasnow's strong production sets the stage for this raucous rock 'n' blues session, as Tina rips up the vocals and Ike provides the rhythm.

== Awards and nominations ==
The Hunter earned Tina Turner her first solo Grammy nomination for Best R&B Vocal Performance, Female at the 12th Annual Grammy Awards.

== Reissues ==
The Hunter was reissued on CD by Universal Music in 2018.

== Track listing ==
Side A
No.	Title	Writer(s)	Length
1.	"The Hunter"	Booker T. Jones, Carl Wells, Donald Dunn, Steve Cropper, Al Jackson, Jr.	6:33
2.	"You Don't Love Me (Yes I Know)"	Willie Cobbs	2:54
3.	"You Got Me Running"	Jimmy Reed	2:59
4.	"Bold Soul Sister"	Ike Turner, Tina Turner	2:36

Side B
No.	Title	Writer(s)	Length
1.	"I Smell Trouble"	Don Robey	3:44
2.	"The Things I Used to Do"	Eddie "Guitar Slim" Jones	3:14
3.	"Early in the Morning"	Traditional; arranged by Ike Turner and Bob Krasnow	3:01
4.	"You're Still My Baby"	Chuck Willis	2:47
5.	"I Know"	Barbara George	2:31

== Chart performance ==
Chart (1969–70)	Peak position
US Billboard Top LPs	176
US Billboard Soul LPs	49
