= The Acid Queen =

1976 single by the Who

Song by the Who

from the album Tommy
- Released: 23 May 1969
- Length: 3:34
- Label: Polydor
- Songwriter: Pete Townshend
- Producer: Kit Lambert

"The Acid Queen" is a song written by Pete Townshend and is the ninth song on the Who's rock opera album Tommy. Townshend also sings the lead vocal. The song tells the attempts of Tommy's parents to try to cure him. They leave him with an eccentric Romani, a self-proclaimed "Acid Queen", who feeds Tommy various hallucinogenic drugs and performs sexually in an attempt to free him from isolation.

Several notable singers have performed the song including Merry Clayton, Patti LaBelle, Bette Midler and Tina Turner.

== Background ==
"The Acid Queen" is often grouped with the album's next track, "Underture", a lengthy instrumental which deals with Tommy's hallucinations and his experience with acid. The one cover song on Tommy, "Eyesight to the Blind", may have been included to introduce the character of the acid queen. Tommy's parents take Tommy to the Acid Queen to see if her "lascivious attentions" can cure Tommy of his ills. However, she is unsuccessful in awakening him.

Pete Townshend used Tommy's blindness to represent our "...blindness to reality". The Acid Queen symbolized mindless self-indulgence, and attempted to use drugs to cure Tommy's ailments: deafness, muteness and blindness." Townshend has also said that "The song's not just about acid: it's the whole drug thing, the drink thing, the sex thing wrapped into one big ball. It's about how you get it laid on you that if you haven't fucked forty birds, taken sixty trips, drunk fourteen pints or whatever...society – people – force it on you. She represents this force."

Who biographer John Atkins describes the song as "a distinctive and fully matured song in which Pete's vocals give a fine sense of urgency, suggesting that a sexual as well as drug initiation is being offered by the character. Chris Charlesworth calls it "one of the best songs on Tommy".

== Personnel ==
The Who

- Pete Townshend – lead vocals, acoustic guitar, electric guitar, electric piano
- John Entwistle – bass guitar
- Keith Moon – drums

== Tina Turner version ==
"Acid Queen"
- 1978 German picture sleeve

Single by Tina Turner

from the album Acid Queen
- B-side: "Let's Spend The Night Together"
- Released: January 1976 (UK); 1978 (Germany)
- Studio: Bolic Sound (Inglewood, California)
- Genre: Soul
- Length: 3:01
- Label: United Artists, EMI
- Songwriter: Pete Townshend
- Producers: Denny Diante, Spencer Proffer

Tina Turner singles chronology
"Whole Lotta Love" (1975)	"Acid Queen" (1976)	"Under My Thumb" (1977)

"Acid Queen" is the third single released from the Tina Turner album of the same name, following "Baby, Get It On" and "Whole Lotta Love". The single was released in the UK in January 1976. The record was produced by Denny Diante and Spencer Proffer. "Acid Queen" was Turner's last single before her departure from the Ike & Tina Turner Revue in 1976.

A different recording of the song is also included on the soundtrack album to the 1975 film Tommy in which Turner stars as the Acid Queen. The original soundtrack version of the song has been featured in the Tina Turner compilation albums The Collected Recordings - Sixties to Nineties (1994), Tina! (2008) and The Platinum Collection (2009). It has also been included in some Ike & Tina Turner compilations, including Proud Mary: The Best of Ike & Tina Turner (1991).

The song was also featured on Turner's 50th Anniversary Tour in 2008 with added elements of "Won't Get Fooled Again" and was included on the DVD of the live album Tina Live.

=== Track listing ===
1. "Acid Queen" – 3:01
2. "Let's Spend the Night Together" – 2:58

=== Official versions ===
- Original soundtrack version – 3:50
- Album version – 3:01

== References in other media ==
Bob Dylan's song "Murder Most Foul"—released in March 2020, but recorded at an unknown, earlier date—references both "The Acid Queen" and "Tommy Can You Hear Me?"
