= So Fine (Johnny Otis song) =

1958 single by The Fiestas

Single by The Fiestas
- B-side: "Last Night I Dreamed"
- Released: November 1958
- Genre: Doo-wop
- Length: 2:24
- Label: Old Town
- Songwriter: Johnny Otis

The Fiestas singles chronology
"So Fine" (1958)	"I'm Your Slave" (1959)

"So Fine" is a song written by Johnny Otis and performed by The Fiestas. It reached No. 3 on the U.S. R&B chart and No. 11 on the U.S. pop chart in 1959.

Jim Gribble is credited as the writer; however, Johnny Otis filed a lawsuit claiming the copyright. The song had been recorded in 1955 by The Sheiks, a group that included Jesse Belvin. Otis' side won the case.

The song was ranked No. 69 on Billboard's Year-End Hot 100 singles of 1959.

== Ike & Tina Turner version ==
Bandleader Ike Turner had been performing "So Fine" with his Kings of Rhythm since 1959. Ike & Tina Turner recorded it for Turner's label Innis Records. Innis was acquired by Pompeii Music Corp. in 1968. The first release from Pompeii Records was "So Fine" by Ike & Tina Turner and the Ikettes in March 1968. The song became the title track for the album So Fine (1968). The single reached No. 50 on the Billboard R&B Singles chart and No. 117 on the Bubbling Under the Hot 100 in 1968.

== Other charting versions ==
- Johnny Rivers released a rendition as a medley with "Searchin'" which reached No. 113 on the U.S. pop chart in 1973.
- The Oak Ridge Boys' take reached No. 22 on the U.S. country chart and No. 76 on the U.S. pop chart in 1982. It was featured on their album Bobbie Sue.

"So Fine"
- Picture sleeve (Netherlands)

Single by Ike & Tina Turner

from the album So Fine
- B-side: "So Blue Over You"
- Released: March 1968
- Genre: R&B
- Label: Innis/Pompeii/London
- Songwriter: Johnny Otis
- Producer: Ike Turner

Ike & Tina Turner singles chronology
"A Love Like Yours (Don't Come Knocking Everyday)" (1967)	"So Fine" (1968)	"We Need an Understanding" (1968)

== Other versions ==
- The Hollywood Argyles - as the B-side to their 1960 single "Hully Gully".
- Maurice Williams and the Zodiacs - on their 1961 album Stay.
- The Ventures - on their 1963 album Let's Go!
- The Premiers - as a single in 1964, but it did not chart. It was produced by Eddie Davis.
- The Believers - as a single in 1965, but it did not chart. It was produced by Joe South.
- The Everly Brothers - on their 1965 album Rock'n Soul.
- Paul Revere and The Raiders - as a single in 1966, but it did not chart.
- Dale and Grace - as the B-side to their 1967 single "It Keeps Right On A-Hurtin'".
- The Newbeats - as the B-side to their 1967 single "Top Secret". It was produced by Wesley Rose.
- Stone Poneys - as a single in 1968, but it did not chart.
- Amen Corner - as a single in 1969, but it did not chart.
- Elvin Bishop Group - as a single in 1970, but it did not chart. It was produced by David Rubinson.
- Loggins and Messina - on their 1975 album So Fine.
