= Pompeii Records =

American record company

- Parent company: Pompeii Music Corp.
- Founded: March 1968
- Founder: Joe Perry, Pat Morgan
- Defunct: 1970s
- Distributors: Atco Records, London Records
- Country of origin: United States
- Location: Dallas, Texas

Pompeii Records was an American record label based in Dallas. It was formed in 1968 by Joe Perry, president, and Pat Morgan, chairman of the board. Distributed by Atco Records in the US and by London Records internationally, the company is noted for its Ike & Tina Turner releases in the late 1960s.

== Overview ==
Joe Perry formerly of Big State Distributors formed a partnership with Pat Morgan and launched Pompeii Music Corp. which included two labels, Pompeii Records and Innis Records. Innis was founded by Ike Turner and he had already released a handful of singles by various artists.

The first release from Pompeii was the single "So Fine" by Ike & Tina Turner in March 1968.

Pompeii was distributed by Atco Records, and imprint of Atlantic Records, in the United States, and London Records internationally.

Pat Morgan, a former nightclub owner, was also a producer at Pompeii and eventually became the president. In 1969, he merged the company with the publicly owned corporation Computer System Management, and Pompeii was renamed CSM-Pompeii. The subsidiary labels Vesuvius and Turtle Creek were also added. Turtle Creek was formed to handle country artists.

The company owned their own pressing plant, Reco-Press of Dallas, which printed all of the Pompeii labels as well as others.

== Roster ==
Acts signed to Pompeii included:

- Ike & Tina Turner
- The Ikettes
- Don "Jake" Jacoby
- Les Watson & the Panthers
- LeRoy Horne
- Salt & Pepper
- Wild Turkey
- Fontella Bass
- Dale McBride
- Jimmy Taylor
- Delores Johnson
- Scotty McKay

== Selected discography ==
=== Albums ===
- 1968: Ike & Tina Turner – So Fine
- 1969: Ike Turner – A Black Man's Soul
- 1969: Ike & Tina Turner – Cussin', Cryin' & Carryin' On
- 1970: Caleb Brooks – And Now ... Caleb Brooks

=== Singles ===
Catalog No.	Release date	US	US R&B	Single (A-side, B-side)	Artist
6667	Mar 1968	117	50	"So Fine" b/w "So Blue Over You"	Ike & Tina Turner and the Ikettes
6670	May 1968			"Theme From Elvira Madigan" b/w "The Eyes Of Love"	Don "Jake" Jacoby
66675	Aug 1968			"We Need an Understanding" b/w "It Sho Ain't Me"	Ike & Tina Turner
66681	Sep 1968			"Country Boy" b/w "Born To Love You"	Dale McBride
66682	Nov 1968			"You Got What You Wanted" b/w "Too Hot To Hold"	Tina Turner with Ike Turner & The Kings Of Rhythm
66692	Apr 1969			"Salty Water Man" b/w "Truely True"	Scott McKay
66700	Jun 1969			"Cussin', Cryin' & Carryin' On" b/w "Shake A Tail Feather"	Ike & Tina Turner
7002	Aug 1970			"On The Road To Love" b/w "Get Your Own"	Paul Kirk
7001	April 1971			"Window Of My Mind" b/w "It's You"	Lainie Kazan
