= Kurt Loder =

American journalist, film critic, author, and television personality (born 1945)

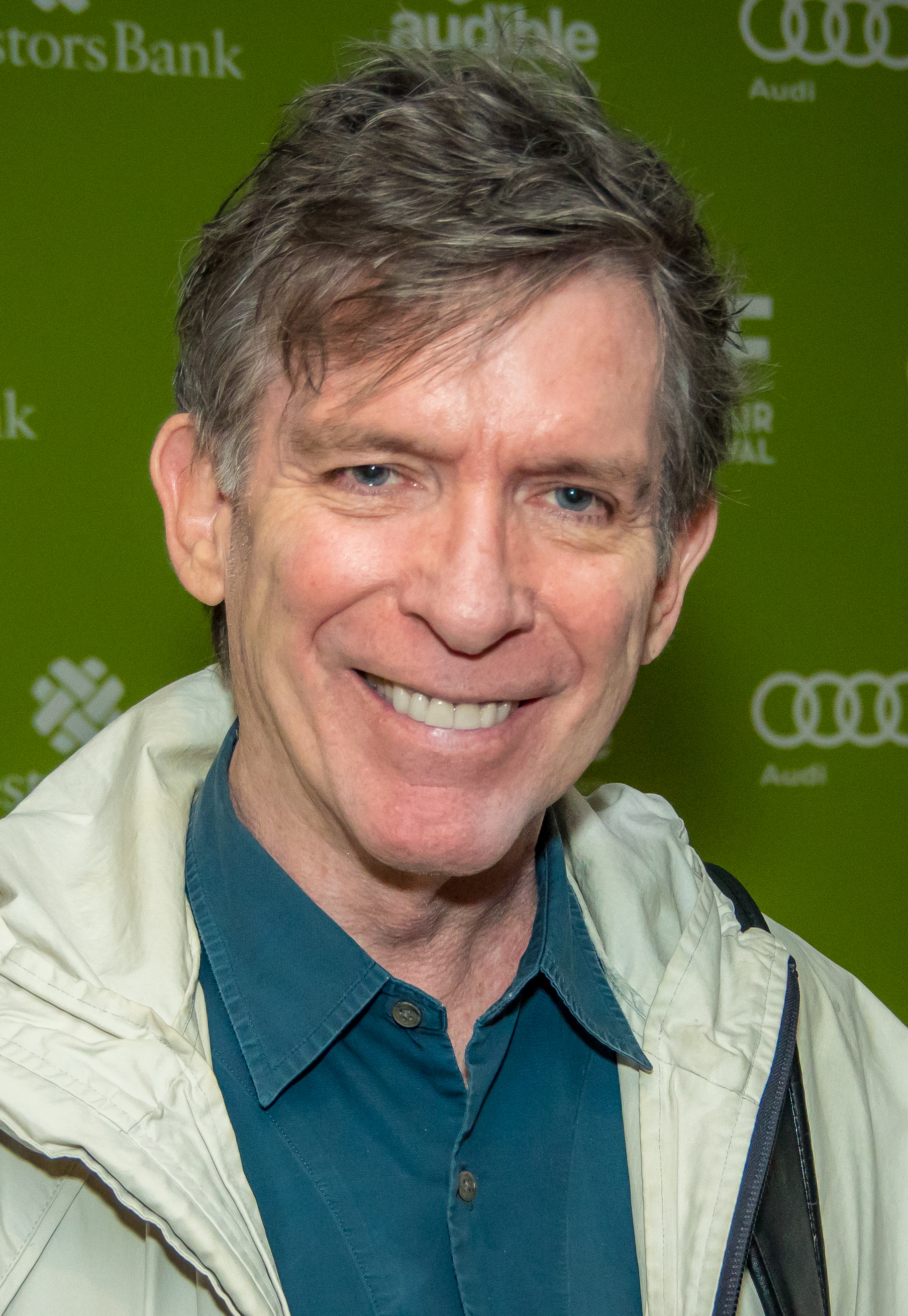
- Loder at the 2015 Montclair Film Festival
- Born: May 5, 1945 (age 81); Miami, Florida, U.S.
- Occupations: Journalist; film critic; author; columnist; television personality
- Years active: 1972–present
- Known for: Anchor and correspondent for MTV News; Host of The Week in Rock; Writer and editor at Rolling Stone; Co-author of I, Tina

Kurt Loder (born May 5, 1945) is an American journalist, film critic, author, columnist and television personality. He spent nine years as a writer and editor at Rolling Stone, during a tenure that Reason later described as “legendary.” While at the magazine, he co-authored singer Tina Turner's 1986 autobiography, I, Tina.

Loder later became one of the most recognizable figures associated with MTV News. Beginning in the late 1980s, he wrote and hosted the weekly music-news program The Week in Rock and worked as an MTV News anchor, correspondent and interviewer. He remained an on-air presence at the network through the 1990s and into the 2000s and also wrote movie reviews for MTV.com.

He has contributed to publications including Reason, Esquire, Details, New York and Time. He has also appeared as himself in films and television programs. In 2016, he began hosting the SiriusXM interview program True Stories.

== Early life ==
Loder was born in Miami, Florida. He lived in Peru during part of his childhood before his family settled in Ocean City, New Jersey. His father worked for an airline.

Loder graduated from Ocean City High School in 1963. He subsequently attended Oklahoma City University and Temple University for a total of approximately two years, which he later said he “just hated.”

=== United States Army service ===
After leaving college, Loder joined the United States Army and served for three years. He was stationed in Bavaria, then part of West Germany, and later joked that he had spent his enlistment defending the United States in Bavarian beer halls, primarily from hostile drunkards.

Loder attended an Army journalism school, which he has described as his only formal journalism education. In different accounts, he has recalled the course as lasting approximately four weeks or two months.

He worked for an Army newspaper while stationed in Europe. Loder later recalled that his first writing assignments came through the newspaper and that the work taught him to report, compose articles and meet publication deadlines.

Loder summarized his formal journalism training by saying:

My entire journalism background is four weeks. ... That's it. Nothing else. You can learn journalism in four weeks. It's not an overcomplicated thing. It's very simple.

After completing his Army service, Loder remained in Europe for several years. He worked in journalism that he later characterized as “scandal sheet” or “yellow journalism.”

== Career ==
=== Early journalism ===
Loder has said that he “just fell into” journalism rather than deliberately pursuing it through college or a conventional professional training program.

He returned to New Jersey at the end of 1972 and worked for a local newspaper. He later joined an Ocean City-based magazine operated by the sister of writer Gay Talese.

In the summer of 1976, Loder left Ocean City to work for Good Times, a free rock-music weekly published on Long Island. He earned approximately $200 a week.

At Good Times, Loder met fellow “music geek” David Fricke, who would also become a prominent music journalist. Loder later recalled:

The two of us began driving into Manhattan virtually every night to wallow in the flourishing punk rock scene at CBGB's, Max's, etc. This was, fortunately, cool with the wives. I mean, we'd still be sitting upright at four in the morning through fist fights, mass nod-outs, and sets by bands with names like Blinding Headache, played to audiences of three people, of which we'd be two-thirds. I don't think I can quite convey how great those days were.

Fricke similarly recalled meeting Loder at Good Times near the end of 1977, living across the street from him and regularly accompanying him to clubs in New York City.

=== Circus ===
Loder and Fricke joined Circus in 1978. Loder became one of the magazine's editors. He later described its staff atmosphere as enjoyable and relaxed but regarded the publication itself as a second- or third-tier music magazine.

The magazine concentrated heavily on commercially successful pop, hard rock and heavy metal. Loder later described its editorial priorities:

Whatever was said to be “happening” in commercial pop music was ... on the cover of Circus. Disco? Run with it. Shirtless teen popsters? Put 'em on the cover ... a, shall we say, ardent enthusiasm for pix of nubile youths. Metal, of course, was really the mag's meat.

He also said that “it was a foregone conclusion that writing of any technical ambition about new acts of any real excitement or interest would make it in the mag only by the sheerest accident.”

Despite his criticism of the magazine's editorial direction, the position allowed him to write regularly about popular music and helped establish him within the New York music press.

=== Rolling Stone ===
While working at Circus, Loder received a tryout assignment from Rolling Stone. His first assignment for the magazine was an article about the country-rock band Poco. After completing the piece, he joined the magazine in May 1979.

Loder remained at Rolling Stone for nine years, working as an editor, critic and feature writer. Rock Critics Archives later called him one of the magazine's most talented and prolific feature writers. His work included album reviews, artist profiles, interviews and reports about the music business.

Among the musicians and cultural figures Loder interviewed or profiled were David Bowie, Bob Dylan, Mick Jagger, Iggy Pop, Prince, U2, The Ramones, Laurie Anderson, Andy Warhol and Tina Turner.

In 1984, Loder interviewed Turner during the commercial resurgence surrounding her album Private Dancer. The article led to a longer collaboration in which Loder conducted extensive interviews with Turner and people connected to her life and career. He co-authored her autobiography, I, Tina: My Life Story, published in 1986.

The book described Turner's childhood, her musical partnership and marriage to Ike Turner, the abuse she experienced during the relationship and her later emergence as a successful solo artist. It became a bestseller and served as the basis for the 1993 biographical film What's Love Got to Do with It, starring Angela Bassett and Laurence Fishburne.

The American Film Institute's production history states that producers later considered hiring Loder to rewrite the film but that he declined because he did not feel equipped to reshape the story into the more upbeat treatment they wanted. Kate Lanier received sole screenplay credit.

In 1990, Loder published Bat Chain Puller: Rock and Roll in the Age of Celebrity, a collection of his interviews, profiles and criticism.

=== MTV News ===
MTV News began as a formal programming operation in 1987 with The Week in Rock, a weekly news program hosted by Loder. MTV recruited him from print journalism to join its news department as an interviewer, correspondent and host.

Although the program began in 1987, Loder has described himself as arriving at MTV in 1988, when his regular work at the network was underway. He later recalled:

When I got to MTV in 1988 it was a wonderful period. Everything was booming so you could do all this stuff and there were no rules about what this operation should be like. You made it up as you went along. There was no end to what you could do.

Loder wrote and hosted The Week in Rock, which summarized major developments in music, entertainment and popular culture. The program became the flagship of MTV's news operation. Loder also delivered shorter news reports between the network's regular programming and worked as an anchor, interviewer and correspondent on documentaries and special reports.

As MTV News expanded, Loder covered both entertainment stories and subjects beyond record releases and celebrity promotion. The division produced reporting about politics, censorship, substance abuse, public health, religious movements, racism and youth culture. Loder also participated in MTV initiatives including Rock Against Drugs and Rock the Vote.

He interviewed or reported on musicians including Madonna, Michael Jackson, Prince, Axl Rose, Nirvana, Tupac Shakur, the Rolling Stones, Bruce Springsteen and Johnny Cash. He covered the MTV Video Music Awards and frequently conducted interviews during the network's pre-show and backstage broadcasts.

One widely replayed incident occurred during the 1995 Video Music Awards, when Courtney Love interrupted Loder's live interview with Madonna by throwing objects toward the interview platform. Loder invited Love to join the conversation.

On April 8, 1994, Loder interrupted MTV's regular programming to announce that Nirvana singer Kurt Cobain had been found dead at his Seattle home. He anchored the network's continuing coverage and read information from police reports during the first hours after the discovery. The broadcast became one of the best-known moments in MTV News history. MTV News subsequently increased the frequency of its programming.

Loder later hosted MTV News 1515, a weekly program about music, entertainment and popular culture, and anchored MTV News Presents specials.

The Week in Rock remained on the air for approximately a decade. Loder continued working as an MTV News anchor and correspondent after the weekly program ended. An archived MTV biography still identified him as a correspondent in 2003.

In 2004, Loder began writing weekly movie reviews for MTV.com. He continued making on-air appearances during the middle of the decade, including MTV Video Music Awards coverage, but his television role gradually diminished. By 2010, The New Yorker described him as a former MTV News anchor. No single widely publicized final broadcast or formal departure date marked the end of his regular MTV work.

When MTV News was closed in 2023, Loder reflected on the division's development and its role in treating music and youth culture as legitimate news subjects.

=== Film criticism and later work ===
Loder increasingly concentrated on film criticism during the 2000s. In addition to his MTV.com reviews, he wrote about movies for Reason and Creators Syndicate.

He has said that he prefers the description “movie reviewer” to “film critic,” reserving the latter term for writers with a more scholarly approach to cinema.

In 2011, St. Martin's Press published The Good, the Bad and the Godawful: 21st-Century Movie Reviews. The book collected more than 200 reviews originally written for MTV.com and Reason.

In 2016, Loder began hosting True Stories on the SiriusXM music-talk channel Volume. The monthly program featured extended interviews with musicians, filmmakers and other entertainment figures. Billy Gibbons of ZZ Top appeared on its debut episode.

Loder has appeared as himself in television series including Kenan & Kel, Duckman, Saturday Night Live, Girlfriends, Portlandia and “That '90s Show,” an episode of The Simpsons. He was parodied in the South Park episode “Timmy 2000.”

He has also appeared in films including The Adventures of Ford Fairlane, Airheads, Belly, Pups, Book of Shadows: Blair Witch 2 and Pauly Shore Is Dead.

== Personal views ==
=== Politics ===
Loder identifies as a libertarian and has summarized his political outlook as “free love and free markets.”

Loder opposed President George H. W. Bush in the 1992 United States presidential election. He later said he believed that MTV News had played a small role in Bush's defeat by encouraging political engagement among younger viewers.

He has criticized government surveillance and regulatory policies associated with former New York City mayor Michael Bloomberg, whom he called “a scary guy.”

Loder has attributed some of his political outlook to his childhood on the Jersey Shore:

I grew up on the Jersey Shore on a little barrier island. The Atlantic Ocean was on one side, the bay was on the other. Everyone there hunted and fished and clammed and got crabs out of the bay. And one day my brother told me someone had come down from the Bureau of Petty Harassment or something and they measured the temperature of the water and had decided it was a little too warm and a certain type of bacteria might incubate in it and there was a chance that might harm the clams. And so from now on, no one was supposed to take clams out of the bay anymore. Which everyone ignored. And no one died. That was before the government got tenacious about this stuff. So I thought that was pretty stupid right there.

In 1989, Skid Row singer Sebastian Bach was photographed wearing a T-shirt bearing the anti-gay slogan “AIDS Kills Fags Dead,” a variation on an advertising slogan for Raid insecticide. Loder criticized Bach, writing, “In the land of homophobia, if Axl Rose owns the restaurant and Public Enemy are the diners, we have a new busboy.”

Bach called Loder's characterization “complete bullshit.” He said that he had used the shirt to dry himself off without initially reading its message, stated that he opposed the slogan and later issued several public apologies.

Loder was highly critical of Michael Moore's 2007 documentary Sicko, describing the film as “heavily doctored.” He argued that the documentary presented a misleading account of government-managed healthcare systems, writing, “When governments attempt to regulate the balance between a limited supply of healthcare and an unlimited demand for it they're inevitably forced to ration treatment.”

=== Media and journalism ===
Loder has defined news as “anything that's interesting.” He has criticized the concept of New Journalism, arguing that it has sometimes been used as a rhetorical shield for lazy or insufficiently factual reporting.

He has said that technological change and the expansion of available media have fragmented American culture to the point that no single musical or cinematic success can unite a mass audience in the way that acts such as The Beatles once did.

Loder strongly supports copyright protections for writers, musicians and other creators. Although generally supportive of digital and new media, he once joked about the size and influence of MTV's corporate ownership: “MTV is part of Viacom, which controls Paramount, and so on and so forth. It's the evil empire.”

Loder has argued that journalists should maintain professional distance from the people they cover:

You shouldn't make friends. It's not a good thing to be friends with people you're covering. There's just no point in doing it. It's tempting, but they're not going to consider you their friend anyway. They just know that you're somebody that can do something for them. So you shouldn't really flatter yourself that they want to be your buddy. They don't. ... They want you for some reason or other, and you just have to fend that off all the time. And you can't really cover people critically that you're friends with. How would that work? That would be bad. So you always have to keep that in mind.

== Bibliography ==
- Turner, Tina; Loder, Kurt (1986). I, Tina: My Life Story. William Morrow and Company. ISBN 9780688059491.
- Loder, Kurt (1990). Bat Chain Puller: Rock and Roll in the Age of Celebrity. St. Martin's Press. ISBN 9780312045883.
- Loder, Kurt (2011). The Good, the Bad and the Godawful: 21st-Century Movie Reviews. Thomas Dunne Books. ISBN 9780312641351.
