= I, Tina =

1986 autobiography by Tina Turner

- Cover of the first edition
- Author: Tina Turner
- Language: English
- Publisher: William Morrow and Company
- Publication date: September 1, 1986
- Publication place: United States
- Media type: Print (Paperback)
- Pages: 207

I, Tina: My Life Story is a 1986 autobiography by Tina Turner, co-written by MTV news correspondent and music critic Kurt Loder. It was published by William Morrow and Company, and was reissued by Dey Street Books in 2010.

== Content ==
The book details Tina Turner's story from her childhood in Nutbush, Tennessee, to her initial rise to fame in St. Louis under the leadership of blues musician Ike Turner which became an abusive marriage, leading up to her resurgence in the 1980s.

=== Contributors ===
The book contains passages from many of Turner's family, friends and associates, including:

- Joe Bihari
- Bonnie Bramlett
- Alline Bullock
- Zelma Bullock (Tina's mother)
- Roger Davies
- Venetta Fields
- Rhonda Graam (Ike & Tina's road manager)
- Bob Gruen
- Raymond Hill
- Bob Krasnow
- Clayton Love
- Robbie Montgomery
- Juggy Murray
- Harry Taylor (Tina's first love)
- Craig Turner (Tina's son with Raymond Hill)
- Ike Turner
- Ike Turner Jr. (Tina's adopted son)
- Ronnie Turner (Tina's son with Ike Turner)
- Gene Washington (Kings of Rhythm drummer / boyfriend of Tina's sister Alline)

== Reception ==
The book became a worldwide best-seller when it was released and led to the 1993 film adaptation What's Love Got to Do with It, starring Angela Bassett as Turner; for her acclaimed performance as the singer, Bassett was nominated for an Academy Award for Best Actress.

In 1999, Ike Turner released his own autobiography, Takin' Back My Name, which in part is a rebuttal of the image presented of him in Tina's book and the film.
