= Takin' Back My Name =

1999 autobiography by Ike Turner

Takin' Back My Name: The Confessions of Ike Turner
- Author: Ike Turner; Nigel Cawthorne
- Language: English
- Genre: Autobiography
- Publisher: Virgin Books
- Publication date: May 28, 1999
- Publication place: United Kingdom
- Media type: Print (Paperback)
- Pages: 256
- ISBN: 9781852278502
- OCLC: 43321298

Takin' Back My Name: The Confessions of Ike Turner is a 1999 autobiography by American musician Ike Turner with British writer Nigel Cawthorne.

== Overview ==
After Ike Turner's ex-wife Tina Turner revealed that his violent behavior and infidelity drove her to attempt suicide in her 1986 autobiography, I, Tina: My Life Story (dramatized in the 1993 film What's Love Got to Do with It), he became a social pariah whose personal life overshadowed his musical contributions. In Takin' Back My Name, Turner tells his story from his childhood through the pinnacle of his career with the Ike & Tina Turner Revue, his cocaine-fueled downfall, and his career revival in the 1990s.

== Narrative ==
Takin' Back My Name begins with an introduction by musician Little Richard who emphasizes Ike Turner's influence as a rock 'n' roll pioneer. Turner then recounts his life woven with inner thoughts and newfound perspectives.

Izear Luster Turner, better known as "Ike Turner," was born in Clarksdale, Mississippi. Early in his musical career, he worked for the Los Angeles–based Bihari brothers as an A&R man at Modern Records, scouting the Delta blues scene in search of artists to record. With his own band the Kings of Rhythm, Turner recorded "Rocket 88," a distorted-guitar ode to the Oldsmobile 88, which is credited as being the first rock ‘n’ roll record, at Sam Phillips’ Memphis recording studio in 1951. Instead of Turner's name on the record, his saxophonist (and vocalist on the track) Jackie Brenston was credited. He then worked as a talent scout and session musician at Sun Records.

In 1954, Turner relocated his band to East St. Louis, Illinois. There he met Ann Bullock who joined his band. He called her "Little Ann" and he eventually created her stage name Tina Turner. He formed the Ike & Tina Turner Revue in 1960 which was followed by a string of hit records and relentless touring in the 1960s. At the peak of their commercial success in the early 1970s, they toured internationally and had their own recording studio, Bolic Sound, which became Turner's playground, rife with explicit tales of sex and cocaine use. By the mid 1970s, the Turners' relationship was deteriorating, and after a physical altercation in 1976, they divorced in 1978.

In 1986, after making a success of her comeback, Tina Turner released her autobiography I, Tina, which was filled with recounts of spousal abuse. At the time, Turner was on a downward spiral, which ended with an 18-month stint in prison for drug possession. After his release in the early 1990s, Tina's book was adapted into the film What’s Love Got To Do With It. Laurence Fishburne's menacing portrayal of Turner in the film and the alleged fabrications in the script further damaged Turner's reputation. Despite this, Turner reformed a new Revue, and after a long absence from the stage he resumed performing.

== Critical reception ==
Reviewing the book for The Guardian, Caroline Sullivan wrote: "Takin' Back My Name is one of the few celebrity memoirs unbelaboured by excuses for bad behaviour. Admirably, Turner refuses to blame anyone but himself for a life of excess that began at the age of six when he was seduced by a certain Miss Boozie in Clarksdale."

Glyn Brown wrote for The Independent: "In it, he comes over as an egotist just doing the best he can in difficult circumstances and, though you wonder if it's maybe 100 per cent unreliable, Ike's an old man now, and he deserves a break. Problem is, Ike doesn't really help himself."
