= River Deep – Mountain High (album) =

Studio album by Ike & Tina Turner
- Released: September 1966
- Recorded: March 1966
- Studio: Gold Star, Los Angeles
- Length: 37:06
- Label: London (UK); A&M (US)
- Producer: Ike Turner, Phil Spector

Ike & Tina Turner chronology
The Soul of Ike & Tina (1966)	River Deep – Mountain High (1966)	So Fine (1968)

Ike & Tina Turner chronology
Cussin', Cryin' & Carryin' On (1969)	River Deep – Mountain High (1969 reissue)	The Hunter (1969)

Singles from River Deep – Mountain High
- 1. "River Deep – Mountain High" Released: 1966; 2. "A Love Like Yours (Don't Come Knocking Everyday)" Released: 1966; 3. "I'll Never Need More Than This" Released: 1967; 4. "River Deep – Mountain High" Released: 1969 (reissue); 5. "A Love Like Yours (Don't Come Knocking Everyday)" Released: 1970 (reissue)

River Deep – Mountain High is a studio album by Ike & Tina Turner. It was originally released by London Records in the UK in 1966, and later A&M Records in the US in 1969. In 2017, Pitchfork ranked it at No. 40 on their list of the 200 Best Albums of the 1960s.

== Background and recording ==
After watching Ike & Tina Turner perform in a club on the Sunset Strip, producer Phil Spector invited them to perform on The Big T.N.T Show in 1965. Spector wanted to produce for Tina Turner and sign the duo to his Philles label. He negotiated a deal with Ike Turner for creative control over his sessions with Tina Turner, but Ike & Tina Turner were still signed to Loma Records, a subsidiary of Warner Bros. Records. Spector negotiated a deal with their manager Bob Krasnow, also head of Loma, offering $20,000 to have them released from their contract. Spector signed Ike & Tina Turner and the Ikettes to his label in April 1966.

By the time Ike & Tina Turner signed to Philles, the album had already been recorded at Gold Star Studios in March 1966. Phil Spector produced six songs using his wall of sound technique, including the title track, which was the first of three singles. Ike Turner produced the remaining tracks which are mostly re-recordings of Ike & Tina Turner's earlier hits. The Ikettes, which included P.P. Arnold, provided backing vocals on the Turner-produced side of the album.

The first single "River Deep – Mountain High" was released in May 1966 and peaked at No. 88 on Billboard Hot 100. The single was a hit in Europe, reaching No. 3 in the UK and No. 1 in Spain. The second single, "I'll Never Need More Than This", was not included on the original album. It missed the Billboard Hot 100, peaking at No. 115 on Bubbling Under the Hot 100. It reached No. 64 in the UK. Tina Turner promoted the single on American Bandstand in 1967. The third single, "A Love Like Yours (Don't Come Knocking Everyday)", reached No. 16 in the UK.

== Releases ==
=== 1966 ===
River Deep – Mountain High was intended to be released on Phil Spector's Philles label as LP-4011 in the US, but it was shelved when the single "River Deep – Mountain High" did not do well on the charts. Only a few copies of LP-4011 were pressed, the covers were never printed, before it was canceled by Philles. However, the single was successful in England. By popular demand, Spector released the album in the UK with liner notes written by Decca's promotion man Tony Hall. Hall included a quote from Spector stating, "We can only assume that England is more appreciative of talent and exciting music than the U.S." Actor Dennis Hopper shot the cover of the album. The album peaked at No. 27 in the UK.

In September 1966, Ike & Tina Turner embarked on a UK Tour with the Rolling Stones to support the album.

=== 1969 ===
The album was eventually released in the United States when it was reissued by A&M Records in 1969. The reissue has a slightly different track listing. It substitutes "You're So Fine" with "I'll Never Need More Than This," which was released as a non-album track in 1967. Upon its release in the US, the album reached No. 102 on the Billboard 200 and No. 28 on the R&B Albums chart.

== Critical reception ==
Professional ratings
Review scores
Source	Rating
AllMusic	3.5/5 stars
Rolling Stone	neutral
Tom Hull – on the Web	A−
The Village Voice	A−

The album received positive reviews.

The Journal (October 8, 1966):

It's a pity that Spector and the Turners have parted company, for this album confirms that Tina's deep and throaty vocals are a perfect foil for his symphonie backing. The Spector-style treatment of standards like "Save the Last Dance For Me" and "Every Day I Have To Cry" is really worth hearing since it blends with wild, rhythmic blues style of the Turners with his rich, enormous sound creations. The other seven tracks show the Turners unadorned and in their best fettle.

Billboard (September 13, 1969):

"River Deep-Mountain High" is one of Phil Spector's best compositions, and Ike & Tina Turner sing the original 1966 version, since revived by Eric Burdon, Deep Purple and others. A hit album in England, A&M and Phil Spector add this 'historic recording' to the Ike & Tina Turner sweepstakes. With the hits "A Fool in Love," "I Idolize You" and "It's Gonna Work Out Fine," this one looks like a big winner.

== Reissues ==
The album was reissued on CD by A&M in 1987. It has since been reissued on CD by various labels, most recently Universal Music in 2018.

== Track listing ==
Original version (1966)
No.	Title	Writer(s)	Producer	Length
1.	"River Deep – Mountain High"	Jeff Barry, Ellie Greenwich, Phil Spector	Phil Spector	3:38
2.	"I Idolize You"	Ike Turner	Ike Turner	3:46
3.	"A Love Like Yours (Don't Come Knocking Everyday)"	Holland–Dozier–Holland	Phil Spector	3:05
4.	"A Fool in Love"	Ike Turner	Ike Turner	3:13
5.	"Make 'Em Wait"	Ike Turner	Ike Turner	2:22
6.	"Hold On Baby"	Jeff Barry, Ellie Greenwich, Phil Spector	Phil Spector	2:59
7.	"Save the Last Dance for Me"	Doc Pomus, Mort Shuman	Phil Spector	3:02
8.	"Oh Baby!"	Kent Harris	Ike Turner	2:46
9.	"Every Day I Have to Cry"	Arthur Alexander	Phil Spector	2:40
10.	"Such a Fool for You"	Ike Turner	Ike Turner	2:48
11.	"It's Gonna Work Out Fine"	J. Michael Lee, Joe Seneca	Ike Turner	3:14
12.	"You're So Fine"	Lance Finney, Willie Schofield, Bob West	Ike Turner	3:14

Reissue version (1969)
No.	Title	Writer(s)	Producer	Length
1.	"River Deep – Mountain High"	Jeff Barry, Ellie Greenwich, Phil Spector	Phil Spector	3:38
2.	"I Idolize You"	Ike Turner	Ike Turner	3:46
3.	"A Love Like Yours (Don't Come Knocking Everyday)"	Holland–Dozier–Holland	Phil Spector	3:05
4.	"A Fool in Love"	Ike Turner	Ike Turner	3:13
5.	"Make 'Em Wait"	Ike Turner	Ike Turner	2:22
6.	"Hold On Baby"	Jeff Barry, Ellie Greenwich, Phil Spector	Phil Spector	2:59
7.	"I'll Never Need More Than This"	Jeff Barry, Ellie Greenwich, Phil Spector	Phil Spector	3:33
8.	"Save the Last Dance for Me"	Doc Pomus, Mort Shuman	Phil Spector	3:02
9.	"Oh Baby!"	Kent Harris	Ike Turner	2:46
10.	"Every Day I Have to Cry"	Arthur Alexander	Phil Spector	2:40
11.	"Such a Fool for You"	Ike Turner	Ike Turner	2:48
12.	"It's Gonna Work Out Fine"	J. Michael Lee, Joe Seneca	Ike Turner	3:14

== Personnel ==
Credits adapted from liner notes.

- Tina Turner – vocals
- John Ewing, Barney Kessel, Don Peake – guitar
- Jimmy Bond – string bass
- Robert Gerstlauer – guitar, baritone sax
- Carol Kaye, Ray Pohlman, Lyle Ritz – Fender bass
- Harold Battiste, Larry Knechtel, Ike Turner, Michael Rubini – piano
- Jim Gordon, Earl Palmer – drums
- Frank Capp, Gene Estes – percussion
- Roy Caton, Oliver Mitchell – trumpet
- John Ewing, Lew McCreary – trombone
- Plas Johnson, Jim Horn, Jim Migliori – tenor sax
- Jim Horn – baritone sax
- The Ikettes, Ike Turner – backing vocals
- Darlene Love, Fanita James, Jean King, Gracia Nitzsche, Clydie King – backing vocals on "River Deep – Mountain High"
- Glen Campbell – guitar, backing vocals on "River Deep – Mountain High"
- Leon Russell – keyboards, backing vocals on "River Deep – Mountain High"
- Phil Spector – producer, tracks 1,3,6,7,8, and 10 (reissue version)
- Ike Turner – producer, tracks 2,4,5,9,11, and 12 (reissue version)
- Jack Nitzsche, Gene Page, Perry Botkin Jr. – arrangers
- Larry Levine – engineer
- Dennis Hopper – photography

== Charts ==
Chart performance for River Deep – Mountain High
Chart	Year	Peak position
Australia (Go-Set)	1970	29
UK Albums (OCC)	1966	27
US Billboard Top LP's	1969	102
US Billboard Soul LP's	1969	28
US Cash Box Top 100 Albums 101–140	1969	119
US Record World 100 Top LP's	1969	87
