= Baby, Get It On =

- German picture sleeve

Single by Ike & Tina Turner

from the album Acid Queen
- B-side: "Baby, Get It On (Disco Version)"
- Released: April 1975
- Recorded: November 1974
- Studio: Bolic Sound (Inglewood, CA), Dierks Studio (Stommeln, Germany)
- Genre: R&B, funk rock
- Length: 3:10
- Label: United Artists Records
- Songwriter: Ike Turner
- Producers: Ike Turner, Denny Diante, Spencer Proffer

Ike & Tina Turner singles chronology
"Sexy Ida" (1974)	"Baby, Get It On" (1975)	"Party Vibes" (1980)

"Baby, Get It On" is song written by Ike Turner and Tina Turner, and released by R&B duo Ike & Tina Turner on United Artist Records in 1975. The song was the lead single from Tina Turner's solo album Acid Queen. It is noted for being the last chart entry for Ike & Tina Turner before their separation.

== Recording and release ==
"Baby, Get It On" is a rare Ike & Tina Turner single that features lead vocals from Ike Turner. It was recorded at the Turners' Bolic Sound studio and Dieter Dierks Studios in Stommeln, Germany during Ike & Tina Turner's European tour in November 1974. The song was produced by Ike Turner, Denny Diante, and Spencer Proffer. It was released in April 1975 as the first single from Tina Turner's second solo album Acid Queen. Ike & Tina Turner promoted the record on several shows including Cher, The Midnight Special, and Don Kirshner's Rock Concert. The single peaked at No. 88 on the Billboard Hot 100 and No. 31 on the R&B chart. It was a top 40 R&B hit on other US R&B charts and a top 10 hit in the Netherlands.

== Critical reception ==
Previewing the single, Tom Moulton wrote in Billboard (March 8, 1975): "Ike and Tina Turner's forthcoming single 'Baby, Baby Get It On' (UA) has all the excitement and sound of the Rolling Stones' 'Funky Rock 'n' Roll.' The duo could have a big disco winner on its hands with this one."

Cash Box (May 10, 1975):

Ike and Tina strike out hard with their most powerful commercial AM cut in quite some time. Particularly important for Tina, riding high as she is currently following her "Acid Queen" role in "Tommy". This tune is a super rocker, with driving rhythm, screamin’ vocals by Tina and the man. Fine break with some funky piano, guitar and vocal interplay between this super duo. What a way to break out into the top ten for one of America's fave ensembles.

== Chart performance ==
=== Weekly charts ===
Chart (1975)	Peak position
US Billboard Hot 100	88
US Billboard Hot Soul Singles	31
US Cash Box Top 100	70
US Cash Box Top 100 R&B	35
US Record World Singles	64
US Record World R&B Singles	34
Belgium (Ultratop 50 Flanders)	20
Netherlands (Single Top 100)	9
UK Singles Chart	53

=== Year-end charts ===
Chart (1975)	Rank
Netherlands (Single Top 100)	79
