= Rough (album) =

Studio album by Tina Turner
- Released: September 1978
- Recorded: 1977
- Studio: Conway, Hollywood, California
- Genre: Blues; rock; disco
- Length: 41:15
- Label: United Artists; EMI
- Producer: Bob Monaco

Tina Turner chronology
Acid Queen (1975)	Rough (1978)	Love Explosion (1979)

Singles from Rough
- 1. "Viva La Money" Released: 1978; 2. "Root, Toot Undisputable Rock 'n Roller" Released: 1979; 3. "Sometimes When We Touch" Released: 1979; 4. "Fruits of the Night" Released: 1979

Professional ratings
Review scores
Source	Rating
AllMusic	3/5 stars

Rough is the third solo studio album by Tina Turner, released in September 1978 on the EMI label in the UK, Ariola Records in West Germany, and United Artists Records in the United States. This is Turner's first solo album released after her divorce from husband Ike Turner in 1978. Her first two solo albums, Tina Turns the Country On! (1974) and Acid Queen (1975), were released while she was still a member of the Ike & Tina Turner Revue. Although Rough received positive critical reception, it was not a commercial success.

== Songs ==
Rough is made up of mostly blues and disco cover songs with a rock influence. Just like the preceding Acid Queen, the album was an indication that Turner wanted to take her music into a rock-oriented direction.

The opening track, "Fruits of the Night", was co-written by Giorgio Moroder's longtime collaborator Pete Bellotte. Turner recorded a cover of Bob Seger's "Fire Down Below" for the album. It also includes Turner's first cover version of Elton John's "The Bitch Is Back", which she re-recorded in 1991 for the tribute album Two Rooms: Celebrating the Songs of Elton John & Bernie Taupin.

"Viva La Money" was the only single released in the United States. Three additional singles were released in Europe: "Root Toot, Undisputable Rock & Roller", "Sometimes When We Touch", and "Fruits of the Night". None of the singles had chart success.

== Critical reception ==
Billboard reviewed the album as an "adventurous variety of old and new material", adding that Turner's "delivery has lost none of its snap and crackle".

Cash Box wrote that "she rocks rough and randy enough to make her pop and soul competitors quiver in their lizard skin tennis shoes. Turner mixes the intensity of the gospel choir with the promised pleasures of the turned-down bed to great effect."

Record World noted, "Turner's sassy vocals are always something to behold and her newest lp is certainly no exception."

Joel Vance of Stereo Review wrote that "one hearing of 'The Bitch Is Back', 'Night Time Is the Right Time', 'Fire Down Below', or 'Root, Toot Undisputable Rock 'n Roller' will convince you that if Tina temporarily abdicated as the queen of steamy soul, she has now reclaimed her throne with a sweet vengeance."

== Reissues ==
The album was re-issued for the first time on CD by EMI in the early 1990s. In November 2023, the album was made available on streaming services and as a digital download, marking its first release in any digital format.

The album was re-issued on LP and CD on November 15, 2024.

== Track listing ==
Side one
No.	Title	Writer(s)	Length
1.	"Fruits of the Night"	Pete Bellotte; Edo Zanki; Vilko Zanki	4:05
2.	"The Bitch Is Back"	Elton John; Bernie Taupin	3:30
3.	"The Woman I'm Supposed to Be"	Cliff Wade	3:10
4.	"Viva La Money"	Allen Toussaint	3:14
5.	"Funny How Time Slips Away"	Willie Nelson	4:08
6.	"Earthquake & Hurricane"	Willie Dixon	2:30

Side two
No.	Title	Writer(s)	Length
7.	"Root, Toot Undisputable Rock 'n' Roller"	Gary Jackson	4:29
8.	"Fire Down Below"	Bob Seger	3:13
9.	"Sometimes When We Touch"	Dan Hill; Barry Mann	3:54
10.	"A Woman in a Man's World"	Hal David; Archie Jordan	2:41
11.	"Night Time Is the Right Time"	Leroy Carr	6:21

== Personnel ==
- Rick Kellis – horn, saxophone, strings, horn arrangements
- Ken Moore – piano, background vocals
- Airto Moreira – percussion
- Dennis Belfield – bass guitar
- Michael Boddicker – synthesizer
- Peter Bunetta, Ed Greene – drums
- Al Ciner – acoustic guitar
- Denise Echols – background vocals
- Venetta Fields – background vocals
- Billy Haynes – bass guitar
- Maxayn Lewis – background vocals
- Deborah Lindsey – background vocals
- Lenny Macaluso – electric guitar
- Bill Oz – harmonica
- Mary Russell – background vocals
- Julia Tillman Waters – background vocals
- Stephanie Spruill – background vocals
- Michael Stephenson – background vocals
- Ron Stockert – synthesizer, clavinet
- Marsha Thacker – background vocals
- Tony Walthers – background vocals
- Jeff "Dino" Deane, Dennis Farias – horn
- William "Smitty" Smith – Hammond organ
- The L.A. Horns – horns
- The Gerald Lee String Company – strings
- Jill Harris – assistant producer
- Claude Mougin – photography

== Charts ==
Chart performance for Rough
Chart (2024)	Peak position
Hungarian Physical Albums (MAHASZ)	33
