= So Fine (Ike & Tina Turner album) =

Studio album by Ike & Tina Turner
- Released: July 1968
- Genre: Soul
- Length: 26:11
- Label: Pompeii
- Producer: Ike Turner

Ike & Tina Turner chronology
River Deep – Mountain High (1966)	So Fine (1968)	Outta Season (1969)

Singles from So Fine
- 1. "Betcha Can't Kiss Me (Just One Time Baby)" Released: 1966; 2. "I Better Get ta' Steppen" Released: 1967; 3. "So Fine" Released: March 1968; 4. "We Need an Understanding" Released: August 1968; 5. "Too Hot to Hold" Released: November 1968

So Fine is a studio album by R&B duo Ike & Tina Turner. The album was released on Pompeii Records in July 1968. It is the first of two albums the duo released on the Pompeii label.

== Content and release ==
So Fine was the first album released by Pompeii Records. It features a remake of Ike and Tina's debut single "A Fool in Love". The duo also covered "Shake a Tail Feather" by The Five Du-Tones and "So Fine" by Johnny Otis. Three songs on the album "Bet'cha Can't Kiss Me (Just One Time)", "It Sho Ain't Me", and "Too Hot to Hold" were written by Mack Rice.

Two songs, "Bet'cha Can't Kiss Me (Just One Time)" and "So Fine" had been released on Ike Turner's label Innis Records. Innis was acquired by Pompeii Music Corp. in 1968.

Of the five singles released from the album only "So Fine" charted. Released by Innis in March 1968, it reached No. 50 on the Billboard R&B Singles chart and No. 117 on Bubbling Under The Hot 100 in 1968.

== Critical reception ==
Professional ratings
Review scores
Source	Rating
Allmusic	3.5/5 stars

The album received positive reviews. Music journalist Mike Jahn wrote So Fine is "one of the best soul albums ever made." Dave Donnelly wrote for the Honolulu Star-Bulletin that "the soul-searing pair demonstrate that they are among the raunchiest of the new breed."

Billboard (July 13, 1968): "This exciting fare, for Ike and Tina know how to infuse their soul performances with drive and spirit. In addition to the title song, 'So Fine,' there are 'You're So Fine,' the classic 'Ain't Nobody's Business,' 'We Need an Understanding,' and others. The [background vocals] are by the Ikettes."

Cash Box (July 20, 1968): "Singing with zest and energy, Ike and Tina Turner render a solid set of potent ditties. Among the offerings, in addition to the title tune, are 'Shake a Tail Feather', 'Ain't Nobody's Business', and 'A Fool in Love'. The vital performance turned in by the duo augurs good things to come for this stirring package."

== Reissues ==
So Fine was reissued as Too Hot to Hold by Pickwick/33 Records in 1974. It was also included in the 1974 double album The Great Album Of Ike And Tina Turner released by Disques Festival in France.

So Fine was digitally remastered by Goldenlane Records and included in the 3-CD compilation The Complete Pompeii Recordings (1968–1969) in 2016.

== Track listing ==
Side A
No.	Title	Writer(s)	Length
1.	"Bet'cha Can't Kiss Me (Just One Time)"	Mack Rice	2:51
2.	"Ain't Nobody's Business"	Ike Turner	2:09
3.	"It Sho Ain't Me"	Mack Rice	3:08
4.	"Too Hot to Hold"	Mack Rice	2:20
5.	"A Fool in Love"	Ike Turner	2:49

Side B
No.	Title	Writer(s)	Length
1.	"I Better Get ta Steppin'"	Ike Turner, Charles Harris	2:49
2.	"Shake a Tail Feather"	Otha Hayes, Verlie Rice, Andre Williams	2:15
3.	"So Fine"	Johnny Otis	2:41
4.	"We Need an Understanding"	Ike Turner, Johnny Northern	2:43
5.	"You're So Fine"	Lance Finney, Willie Schofield	2:26
Total length:			26:11
