= Love Explosion =

Studio album by Tina Turner
- Released: November 2, 1979
- Recorded: March 1979
- Studio: Trident Studios (London, UK); CBS Studios (London, UK); Red Bus Studios (London, UK); Power Station Studios (New York, NY)
- Length: 36:05
- Label: United Artists; EMI
- Producer: Alec R. Costandinos

Tina Turner chronology
Rough (1978)	Love Explosion (1979)	Private Dancer (1984)

Singles from Love Explosion
- 1. "Love Explosion" Released: November 1979; 2. "Music Keeps Me Dancin'" Released: November 1979; 3. "Backstabbers" Released: November 9, 1979 (promo)

Professional ratings
Review scores
Source	Rating
AllMusic	2.5/5 stars

Love Explosion is the fourth solo studio album by Tina Turner, released late 1979 by EMI Records in Europe, Ariola Records in West Germany and United Artists Records in the UK. Italy and South Africa followed in early 1980. The album was not released in the United States. It was her second solo album released after she left husband Ike Turner and the Ike & Tina Turner Revue. Love Explosion failed to chart, so Turner lost her recording contract. It was her last album before recording the critically acclaimed Private Dancer in 1984.

== Recording and release ==
Love Explosion was recorded mainly in London (the brass recorded in New York City) and was produced by one of the leading characters in French disco at the time, Alec R. Costandinos, who had written hits for Demis Roussos and worked with bands like Love and Kisses and Cerrone and also appeared on the soundtrack to the 1978 movie Thank God It's Friday. The album features heavy influences of funk and disco.

The track listing includes two soul ballads, "I See Home" and "Just a Little Lovin'", the former originally recorded by Patti LaBelle on her 1978 album Tasty and the latter originally recorded by Dusty Springfield on her 1969 album Dusty in Memphis.

The disco track "Love Explosion" was released as a single in Australia, while "Music Keeps Me Dancin'" was released in Europe. A mid-tempo cover of The O'Jays' 1972 soul classic "Back Stabbers" was released as a promotional single in the UK. Turner performed "Love Explosion" and "Sunset on sunset" on The Midnight Special in 1979. Because the singles and the album failed to chart, United Artists Records and Turner parted ways.

== Reissues ==
After the success of Turner's Private Dancer album, Ariola re-released Love Explosion in September 1984. The album was re-issued on CD by EMI in the early 1990s. In November 2023, the album was made available on streaming services and as a digital download, marking its first release in any digital format.

The album was re-issued on LP and CD on November 15, 2024.

== Track listing ==
Side one
No.	Title	Writer(s)	Length
1.	"Love Explosion"	Lenny Macaluso; Pat Summerson	5:55
2.	"Fool for Your Love"	Leo Sayer; Michael Omartian	3:24
3.	"Sunset on Sunset"	Billy Livsey; David Courtney; Richard Niles	3:35
4.	"Music Keeps Me Dancin'"	Macaluso; Summerson	3:49

Side two
No.	Title	Writer(s)	Length
5.	"I See Home"	Allee Willis; David Lasley	5:19
6.	"Back Stabbers"	Leon Huff; Gene McFadden; John Whitehead	3:34
7.	"Just a Little Lovin'"	Barry Mann; Cynthia Weil	3:12
8.	"You Got What I'm Gonna Get"	Chris Bennett; Molly Ann Leikin	3:08
9.	"On the Radio"	Victor Carstarphen	3:49

== Personnel ==
- Tina Turner – vocals
- Jean-Claude Chavanat – guitar
- Tony Bonfils – bass guitar
- Bernard Arcadio – keyboards
- André Ceccarelli – drums
- Emmanuel "Manu" Roche – percussion
- George Young, Lawrence Feldman, Michael Brecker – tenor saxophone
- Lew Del Gatto – baritone saxophone
- Barry Rogers, David Taylor, Tom Malone, Wayne Andre – trombone
- Alan Rubin, Randy Brecker – trumpet
- George Marge – oboe
- Arthur Simms, Stephanie de Sykes, Stevie Lange, Vicki Brown – background vocals
- The Pat Halling String Ensemble – strings
- Georges Rodi – synthesizer, programming

=== Production ===
- Produced by Alec R. Costandinos
- Engineers: Mike Ross-Trevor, Scott Litt, Geoff Calver, Peter R. Kelsey
- Arranged and conducted by Raymond T. Knehnestky
- Rhythm tracks recorded at Trident Studios (London); Vocals at CBS Studios (London); Strings, Backing Vocals and Synthesizers recorded at Red Bus Studios (London); Brass recorded at Power Station Studios (New York)
- Remixed at Trident Studios, London by Peter R. Kelsey
- "Love Explosion" and "Sunset on Sunset" recorded at Trident Studios, London
- "On the Radio" remixed at Red Bus Studios, London
- Design: RIA Images
- Photography: Claude Mougin

== Charts ==
Chart performance for Love Explosion
Chart (2024)	Peak position
Hungarian Physical Albums (MAHASZ)	32
