= Tina Turns the Country On! =

Studio album by Tina Turner
- Released: September 1974
- Recorded: June 1974
- Studios: Bolic Sound, Inglewood, California
- Genres: Country; folk; soft rock
- Length: 33:49
- Label: United Artists
- Producer: Tom Thacker

Tina Turner chronology
Tina Turns the Country On! (1974)	Acid Queen (1975)

Tina Turns the Country On! is the debut solo studio album by Tina Turner, released in September 1974 on the United Artists Records. Released while Turner was still a member of the Ike & Tina Turner Revue, it was an attempt by her husband, Ike Turner, to expose her to a wider audience. Although the album did not chart, it earned Turner a Grammy Award nomination in the "Best R&B Vocal Performance, Female" category.

== Recording and release ==
Tina Turns the Country On! was recorded at Turner's recording studio, Bolic Sound in Inglewood, California. It was produced by Nashville producer Tom Thacker. The album is made up of mostly covers by various country and folk artists, including Kris Kristofferson, Bob Dylan, Olivia Newton-John, James Taylor and Dolly Parton. The track "Bayou Song" is an original song written for Turner by Peter-John Morse. There were no singles released from the album.

In November 2023, the album was made available on streaming services and as a digital download, marking its first release in any digital format.

The album was re-issued on LP and CD on November 15, 2024.

== Critical reception ==
The album received positive reviews. Cash Box magazine said, "Tina continues to be the performer that has turned on countless thousands." Billboard called it a "fine mix of country, folky and soft rock tunes" and praised Turner's vocal performance, saying that she "molds [her voice] perfectly around each cut" and "proves just as adept an interpreter of other's [sic] material as she is a singer of original songs."

== Awards and nominations ==
The album garnered Turner a Grammy nomination for Best R&B Vocal Performance, Female at the 17th Annual Grammy Awards.

== Track listing ==
Side one
No.	Title	Writer(s)	Length
1.	"Bayou Song"	P.J. Morse	3:22
2.	"Help Me Make It Through the Night"	Kris Kristofferson	2:48
3.	"Tonight I'll Be Staying Here with You"	Bob Dylan	2:58
4.	"If You Love Me (Let Me Know)"	John Rostill	3:00
5.	"He Belongs to Me"	Bob Dylan	3:59

Side two
No.	Title	Writer(s)	Length
1.	"Don't Talk Now"	James Taylor	2:58
2.	"Long Long Time"	Gary White	4:42
3.	"I'm Moving On"	Hank Snow	2:37
4.	"There'll Always Be Music"	Dolly Parton	4:10
5.	"The Love That Lights Our Way"	Fred Karlin; Marsha Karlin	3:15

== Personnel ==
- Tina Turner – vocals, backing vocals
- Clydie King – backing vocals
- Merry Clayton – backing vocals
- Pat Hodges – backing vocals
- Jessie Smith – backing vocals
- Mark Creamer – electric and acoustic guitar
- James Burton – electric guitar
- J. D. Maness – steel guitar
- Glen Hardin – piano
- John Hammond – piano
- Joe Lamano – bass guitar
- Mike Botts – drums
- Tom Scott – saxophone, recorder
- Terrance Lane – percussion, sound effects

Production

- Tom Thacker – producer
- John Horton – engineer
- Mark Creamer – engineer
- Fred Borkgren – engineer
- Steve Waldman – engineer
- D. B. Johnson – engineer
- David Alexander – photography
- Bob Cato – art direction

== Charts ==
Chart performance for Tina Turns the Country On!
Chart (2024)	Peak position
Hungarian Physical Albums (MAHASZ)	34
