= Outta Season =

Studio album by Ike & Tina Turner
- Released: March 1969
- Recorded: 1968
- Genre: Blues; R&B; soul
- Length: 33:00
- Label: Blue Thumb
- Producer: Tina Turner; Bob Krasnow

Ike & Tina Turner chronology
So Fine (1968)	Outta Season (1969)	In Person (1969)

Singles from Outta Season
- 1. "I've Been Loving You Too Long" Released: April 1969; 2. "Crazy 'Bout You Baby" Released: July 1969

Outta Season is a 1969 album by Ike & Tina Turner, released on Blue Thumb Records in the US and Liberty Records in the UK. The album contains their signature live song "I've Been Loving You Too Long."

== Content and release ==
Outta Season is a heavy blues album produced by Tina Turner and Bob Krasnow.

The album contains the track "I Am a Motherless Child," which is based on the spiritual "City Called Heaven". The first single, "I've Been Loving You Too Long," peaked at No. 68 on the Billboard Hot 100 and No. 23 on the Billboard R&B chart in April 1969. The second single "Crazy 'Bout You Baby" was only released in the UK.

== Cover art ==
The art direction was by Tom Wilkes and photography by Barry Feinstein. As a sarcastic statement, Amos and Andy are credited for the design & photography on the album due to the history of the characters being portrayed by white actors wearing blackface in the film Check and Double Check.

The album cover features the Turners (Ike on the front and Tina on the back) in whiteface eating watermelon. Due to the white audiences' interest in blues music in the 1960s, music critic Pete Johnson noted that the Turners are "pictured in whiteface eating big slices of watermelon each winking broadly at any young record buyers who might suspect that black people can't sing the blues."

== Critical reception ==
Professional ratings
Review scores
Source	Rating
Allmusic	2/5 stars

The album received positive reviews.

Music critic Pete Johnson wrote for the Los Angeles Times (March 29, 1969):

Tina is as good a blues interpreter as can be found in the contemporary scene and the material is expertly—if a bit unimaginatively—selected to show off her versatility. Ike Turner's arrangements and guitar playing are consistently good and tasteful. ... "Outta season" is a strong album by some talented people who have been ignored too long.

Cash Box (March 29, 1969):

The 'now' sound is blues, and the blues are now the sound of Ike and Tina Turner. This newly-recorded set features the vet R&B/Pop duo in a more contemporary framework than ever before, with increase emphasis on instrumental happenings. Material includes such blues standards as "Honest I Do," "My Babe," "Rock Me Baby," "Crazy 'Bout You Baby" and "Mean Old World" as well as several Ike or Tina originals and Otis Redding's "I've Been Loving You Too Long."

== Track listing ==
Side A
No.	Title	Writer(s)	Length
1.	"I've Been Loving You Too Long"	Otis Redding, Jerry Butler	3:40
2.	"Mean Old World"	adapted by Ike Turner	2:20
3.	"3 O 'Clock in the Morning Blues"	B.B. King, Jules Taub	2:35
4.	"Five Long Years"	Eddie Boyd	3:20
5.	"Dust My Broom"	adapted by Ike Turner	2:30
6.	"Grumbling (instrumental)"	Ike Turner	2:35
7.	"I Am a Motherless Child"	Tina Turner	3:30

Side B
No.	Title	Writer(s)	Length
1.	"Crazy 'Bout You Baby"	Sonny Boy Williamson	3:25
2.	"Reconsider Baby"	Lowell Fulson	2:40
3.	"Honest I Do"	Ewart Abner, Jimmy Reed	2:20
4.	"Please Love Me"	B.B. King, Jules Taub	2:10
5.	"My Babe"	Willie Dixon	1:50
6.	"Rock Me Baby"	B.B. King, Joe Josea	2:45

== Chart performance ==
Chart (1969)	Peak position
US Billboard Top LPs	91
US Billboard R&B LPs	43
