= Barbara George =

American R&B singer and songwriter

- Born: Barbara Ann Smith; August 16, 1942; New Orleans, Louisiana, U.S.
- Died: August 10, 2006 (aged 63) Chauvin, Louisiana
- Genre: R&B
- Occupations: Singer, Songwriter
- Instrument: Vocals
- Years active: 1961 - 1980s
- Labels: A.F.O. Records, Sue Records

Barbara Ann George (née Smith; August 16, 1942 – August 10, 2006) was an American R&B singer and songwriter.

== Biography ==
Born Barbara Ann Smith at Charity Hospital in New Orleans, Louisiana, United States, she was raised in the 9th ward New Orleans, and began singing in a church choir. She was discovered by singer Jessie Hill, who recommended her to record producer Harold Battiste. Her first record on Battiste's AFO (All For One) record label, the certified gold single "I Know (You Don't Love Me No More)" (composed by her) was issued in late 1961 and topped the R&B chart and made number 3 on the Billboard Hot 100 chart. It was later recorded by many other artists, including Freddie King, Paul Revere & the Raiders (1966), the Merseybeats, Ike and Tina Turner, and Bonnie Raitt (1972).

Her only album, 1961's I Know (You Don't Love Me No More) contains 12 tracks, 11 of which credit George as the writer.

Two subsequent self-penned singles, "You Talk About Love" (on AFO) and "Send For Me (If You Need Some Lovin')" (on Sue Records), reached the Billboard Hot 100 later in 1962, but failed to match the national success of her first hit.

Later recordings such as the 1979 Senator Jones-produced "Take Me Somewhere Tonight", met with more limited success, and George largely retired from the music industry by the early 1980s, with subsequent singles never achieving the success of "I Know". She sang on the Willy DeVille album Victory Mixture (1990).

George had three sons, Tevin, Albert, and Gregory. Tevin trained as a professional boxer and is listed as the United States 1986 winner of the Golden Gloves award, subsequently going on to perform in the Olympic Trials.

George was diagnosed with a liver disease in the mid-1990s. She died from lung infection on August 10, 2006, in Chauvin, Louisiana, where she had spent the last ten years of her life, six days before her 64th birthday.

== Discography ==
=== Albums ===
Year	Title	Record label
1961	I Know (You Don't Love Me No More)	A.F.O.

=== Singles ===
Year	Title	Peak chart positions		Record Label	B-side	Album
Year	Title	US Pop	US R&B	Record Label	B-side	Album
1961	"I Know (You Don't Love Me No More)"	3	1	A.F.O.	"Love (Is Just a Chance You Take)"	I Know (You Don't Love Me No More)
1962	"You Talk About Love"	46	—	A.F.O.	"Whip O Will"	I Know (You Don't Love Me No More)
1962	"If You Think"	114	—	Sue	"If When You’ve Done the Best You Can"	
1962	"Send For Me (If You Need Some Lovin)"	96	—	Sue	"Bless You"	
1962	"The Recipe (For Perfect Fools)"	—	—	Sue	"Try Again"	
1963	"Something's Definitely Wrong"	—	—	Sue	"I Need Something Different"	
1968	"Something You Got"	—	—	Seven B	"Satisfied With Your Love"	
1979	"Take Me Somewhere Tonight"	—	—	Hep' Me	"I Got My Guards Up"	
1980	"Leave Me Alone"	—	—	Hep' Me	"This Is the Weekend"	
