= I Know (You Don't Love Me No More) =

1961 single by Barbara George

Single by Barbara George

from the album I Know (You Don't Love Me No More)
- B-side: "Love (Is Just a Chance You Take)"
- Released: 1961
- Recorded: 1961
- Genre: R&B
- Length: 2:25
- Label: A.F.O.
- Songwriter: Barbara George

Barbara George singles chronology
"I Know (You Don't Love Me No More)" (1961)	"You Talk About Love" (1962)

"I Know (You Don't Love Me No More)" is an R&B song written and recorded by American singer Barbara George, released as her debut single in 1961. It became her signature song and her only major hit in United States, reaching No.1 on the Billboard R&B singles chart and No.3 in the Hot 100. It reached number 3 in New Zealand on the lever hit parade chart. It was later covered by various artists, inducing Fats Domino, Cher, Ike & Tina Turner, and Bonnie Raitt. A Spanish version by Marisela topped Billboard's Latin chart in 1988. The Shirelles borrowed the melody of "I Know" for their 1963 cover of "Everybody Loves A Lover".

== Background ==
Barbara George began singing as a teen in her Baptist church choir and writing her own original songs. Already married by age 16, she later befriended R&B performer Jessie Hill, who wrangled her an audition with saxophonist/arranger Harold Battiste's fledgling AFO label. In June 1961, Battiste organized a split recording session for George and fellow AFO artist Prince La La at producer Cosimo Matassa's J&M Studios. Backed by New Orleans studio performers including cornetist Melvin Lastie, guitarist Roy Montrell, and drummer John Boudreaux, George cut the self-penned "I Know (You Don't Love Me No More)", a vibrant, up-tempo number inspired by the traditional hymn "Just a Closer Walk with Thee". Issued via AFO's national distribution deal with Juggy Murray's Sue Records, "I Know" hit radio and retail in late 1961 and was a national 'crossover' hit, topping the U.S. R&B charts and crossing over to No.3 on Billboard's pop chart.

== Marisela version ==
In 1988, American singer Marisela recorded a cover version of the song for the soundtrack of the film Salsa. The original version recorded by Marisela was sung in English language and included on the film soundtrack, along with songs by Laura Branigan, Tito Puente, Robi Rosa, Wilkins and Grupo Niche. A Spanish language version of the track, produced by Enrique Elizondo, was later included in Marisela's album of the same title, under the title "Ya No". This version became her first No.1 single in the Billboard Hot Latin Tracks chart, temporarily dislodging Franco's "María" for one week from the top of the chart.

== See also ==
- List of number-one R&B singles of 1962 (U.S.)
- List of number-one Billboard Top Latin Songs from the 1980s
