= Proud Mary =

1969 single by Creedence Clearwater Revival

- European picture sleeve

Single by Creedence Clearwater Revival

from the album Bayou Country
- B-side: "Born on the Bayou"
- Released: December 1968 (Note: Sources disagree on the exact release date of "Proud Mary". One book published in 2022 asserts the date as January 9, 1969. This is contradicted by an article in The Plain Dealer dated January 3, 1969, reporting it as a top-20 single for WZAK-FM for the previous day. Billboard reviewed the single in their January 4, 1969, issue. John Fogerty's music publishing company registered "Proud Mary" with the Copyright Office on December 27, 1968; the single release was subsequently advertised in Record World the following day. The official GfK Entertainment charts list the release date as December 30, 1968. Liner notes for the 40th-anniversary reissue of Bayou Country suggest the single was issued just before Christmas 1968.)
- Recorded: 1968
- Studio: RCA (Hollywood, California)
- Genre: Roots rock; swamp rock; Southern rock; folk rock
- Length: 3:07
- Label: Fantasy
- Songwriter: John Fogerty
- Producer: John Fogerty

Creedence Clearwater Revival singles chronology
"I Put a Spell on You" (1968)	"Proud Mary" (1968)	"Bad Moon Rising" (1969)

Music video
- "Proud Mary" (lyric video) on YouTube

"Proud Mary" is a song famously performed by American rock band Creedence Clearwater Revival, written by singer-songwriter John Fogerty. It was released as a single in January 1969 by Fantasy Records and on the band's second studio album, Bayou Country. The song became a major hit in the United States, peaking at No. 2 on the Billboard Hot 100 in March 1969, the first of five singles to peak at No. 2 for the group.

Later that year, R&B singer Solomon Burke released a rendition on Bell Records for his album Proud Mary that reached No. 15 on the Billboard R&B chart.

Another version by R&B duo Ike & Tina Turner for their album Workin' Together, released on Liberty Records in 1971, reached No. 4 on the Billboard Hot 100 and No. 5 on the Billboard R&B chart. They won a Grammy Award for Best R&B Vocal Performance by a Group at the 14th Annual Grammy Awards for their rendition in 1972. After the disbandment of the duo, Tina Turner continued to perform the song during her solo career, and recorded new versions of it for her studio as well as live albums.

== Background and recording ==
In a 1969 interview, John Fogerty said that he wrote it in the two days after he was discharged from the National Guard. In the liner notes for the 2008 expanded reissue of the Creedence Clearwater Revival album Bayou Country, Joel Selvin explained that the songs for the album started when Fogerty was in the National Guard, that the riffs for "Proud Mary", "Born on the Bayou", and "Keep On Chooglin'" were conceived by Fogerty at a concert in the Avalon Ballroom, and "Proud Mary" was arranged from parts of different songs, one of which was about a washerwoman named Mary. The line "Left a good job in the city" was written following Fogerty's discharge from the National Guard, and the line "rollin' on the river" was from a movie by Will Rogers.

The Proud Mary, more formally known as the Mary Elizabeth, was a real ship and was based in Memphis, Tennessee. The Proud Mary traveled along the Mississippi River from 1928 to 1978.

"Proud Mary's" singer, a low-wage earner, leaves what he considers a "good job," which he might define as steady work, even though for long hours under a dictatorial boss. He decides to follow his impulse and imagination and hitches a ride on a riverboat queen, bidding farewell to the city. Only when the boat pulls out does he see the "good side of the city"—which, for him, is one in the distance, far removed from his life. Down by the river and on the boat, the singer finds protection from "the man" and salvation from his working-class pains in the nurturing spirit and generosity of simple people who "are happy to give" even "if you have no money." The river in Fogerty and traditionally in literature and song is a place holding biblical and epical implications. ... Indeed, the river in "Proud Mary" offers not only escape but also rebirth to the singer.

The song is a "seamless mix of black and white roots music." Fogerty explained that he liked Ludwig van Beethoven's Symphony No. 5 and wanted to open a song with a similar intro (descending by a third), implying the way "Proud Mary" opens with the repeated C chord to A chord. Fogerty wanted to evoke male gospel harmonies, as exemplified by groups he was familiar with such as the Swan Silvertones, the Sensational Nightingales, and the Five Blind Boys of Mississippi; especially on the line, "Rollin', rollin', rollin' on the river"; and in the guitar solo he did his "best [imitation of] Steve Cropper." The basic track for "Proud Mary", as with the other songs on the album, was recorded by John Fogerty (lead guitar), Tom Fogerty (rhythm guitar), Stu Cook (bass), and Doug Clifford (drums) at RCA Studios in Hollywood, California, with John overdubbing instruments and all the vocals later.

== Critical reception ==
Billboard described "Proud Mary" as a "driving blues item with a strong beat." Cash Box described it as "a steady moving mid-speed chunk of funk and rhythm that will make itself felt in both pop and underground spots." Cash Box ranked it as the No. 55 single of 1969.

== Chart performance ==
=== Weekly charts ===
Weekly chart performance for "Proud Mary" by Creedence Clearwater Revival
Chart (1969–1970)	Peak position
Australia (Go-Set)	5
Austria (Ö3 Austria Top 40)	1
Belgium (Ultratop 50 Flanders)	7
Belgium (Ultratop 50 Wallonia)	10
Canada Top Singles (RPM)	2
Ireland (IRMA)	13
Netherlands (Dutch Top 40)	11
New Zealand (Listener)	3
Norway (VG-lista)	6
South Africa (Springbok Radio)	1
Sweden	13
Switzerland (Schweizer Hitparade)	4
UK Singles (Official Charts)	8
US Billboard Hot 100	2
US Record World	1
West Germany (GfK)	4
Yugoslavia	1

=== Year-end charts ===
Year-end chart performance for "Proud Mary" by Creedence Clearwater Revival
Chart (1969)	Rank
Australia	25
Canada	56
South Africa	12
US Billboard Hot 100	19

== Certifications ==
Certifications for "Proud Mary" by Creedence Clearwater Revival
Region	Certification	Certified units/sales
New Zealand (RMNZ)	2× Platinum	60,000^{‡}
Spain (Promusicae)	Gold	30,000^{‡}
United Kingdom (BPI)	Silver	200,000^{‡}
United States (RIAA)	2× Platinum	2,000,000^{‡}
^{‡} Sales+streaming figures based on certification alone.

== Solomon Burke version ==
"Proud Mary"

Single by Solomon Burke

from the album Proud Mary
- B-side: "What Am I Living For"
- Released: April 1969
- Recorded: 1969
- Genre: Country soul
- Length: 3:26
- Label: Bell Records; 783
- Songwriter: John Fogerty

In April 1969, Solomon Burke released a cover of Proud Mary on Bell Records. Burke mixed gospel and country music to make the song as a celebration of black consciousness. It was the title track of his 1969 album Proud Mary.

The single was Burke's second release for Bell and was co-produced by singer Tamiko Jones. Jones was being rehabilitated after a bout of polio and was at the time Burke's fiancée and manager. Burke recalled:

We went to Muscle Shoals and recorded Proud Mary, which they didn't like at all. They thought it was stupid to record a song Proud Mary, which was already on the charts. I was explaining to them that it was a very big record, but it's a very white record, a pop record. We will redo the record, open up the doors for it to get on the r&b charts and make the black stations to play the record ... This record was a hit without anybody's help. Proud Mary was only promoted by Tamiko Jones and myself.

On May 24, 1969, Burke performed his version of "Proud Mary" on American Bandstand.

The song returned Burke to the US R&B Top 20, with the single reaching No. 15 on the Billboard R&B chart and No. 45 on the Billboard Hot 100. Burke stated in a 2002 interview: "I was in Vegas for sixteen weeks at the Sands Hotel. I missed this record being a hit, because we weren't there to promote the record, we had no backing. The greatest thing I ever did was tell Ike Turner, 'Hey man, you should get on this record ... I think you and Tina could tear this thing up.'"

Critical reception

The single received positive reviews.

According to Mark Denning, "While that may have seemed like a bald-faced bid for pop radio play, in Burke's hands the song became a bracing tale of life in the Deep South as African-Americans searched for liberation aboard the ship that carried them as slaves and put them to undignified labor serving wealthy whites."

John Fogerty, the song's composer, was impressed by Burke's version of his song: "Two thousand miles away this man had crawled right up inside my head to learn what 'Proud Mary' was all about. Sure, it's great when someone sings your song, but when he understands it, you listen like it was the first time."

Chart performance

Weekly chart performance for "Proud Mary" by Solomon Burke
Chart	Peak position
Canada RPM	45
US Billboard Hot 100	45
US Billboard R&B Singles	15

== The Checkmates Ltd. featuring Sonny Charles version ==
"Proud Mary"

Single by Checkmates, Ltd. featuring Sonny Charles

from the album Love Is All We Have to Give
- B-side: "Do You Love Your Baby"
- Released: September 1969
- Recorded: 1969
- Genre: Soul
- Length: 3:30
- Label: A&M Records; 1130X

Checkmates, Ltd. featuring Sonny Charles singles chronology
"Black Pearl" (1969)	"Proud Mary" (1969)	"I Keep Forgettin'" (1970)

Checkmates, Ltd. recorded a version of "Proud Mary" featuring Sonny Charles, which was arranged by Perry Botkin, Jr. and Dee Barton, and produced by Phil Spector in 1969.

The single was released on A&M Records in September 1969. It reached No. 69 on the US Billboard Hot 100 chart and No. 30 on the U.K. Singles Chart.

Chart performance

Weekly chart performance for "Proud Mary" by Checkmates Ltd.
Chart	Peak position
Canada (RPM)	53
US Billboard Hot 100	69
UK Singles	30

== Ike & Tina Turner version ==
"Proud Mary"
- Picture sleeve (Spain)

Single by Ike & Tina Turner

from the album Workin' Together
- B-side: "Funkier Than a Mosquita's Tweeter" (U.S.); "Honky Tonk Women" (Intl.)
- Released: January 14, 1971
- Recorded: 1970
- Studio: Bolic Sound (Inglewood, California)
- Genre: Funk rock; soul; R&B
- Length: 4:48 (album), 3:15 (7-inch single)
- Label: Liberty Records
- Songwriter: John Fogerty
- Producer: Ike Turner

Ike & Tina Turner singles chronology
"Workin' Together" (1970)	"Proud Mary" (1971)	"Ooh Poo Pah Doo" (1971)

"Proud Mary"

Single by Tina Turner

from the album What's Love Got to Do with It
- B-side: "Disco Inferno"
- Released: November 19, 1993
- Recorded: 1993
- Studio: Record Plant
- Genre: Rock; soul
- Length: 5:27
- Label: Parlophone
- Songwriter: John Fogerty
- Producers: Chris Lord-Alge; Tina Turner; Roger Davies

Tina Turner singles chronology
"Why Must We Wait Until Tonight" (1993)	"Proud Mary" (1993)	"GoldenEye" (1995)

Official audio
- "Proud Mary" on YouTube

In January 1971, Ike & Tina Turner released "Proud Mary" on Liberty Records as the second single from their 1970 album Workin' Together. Their rendition differs greatly from the structure of the original, but is also well-known and became one of Tina Turner's most recognizable signature songs.

According to Tina, Ike was not keen on the original version, but the cover of "Proud Mary" by the Checkmates, Ltd. piqued his interest. Ike and Tina Turner's version was substantially rearranged by Ike Turner and Soko Richardson. The song starts off with a slow, sultry soulful tone in which Tina introduces the song and warns the audience that she and the band are gonna start it off "nice and easy" as "we never do nothing nice and easy" but say they would finish it "nice and rough". After the lyrics are first sung softly by the Turners, the song is then turned into a funk rock vamp with Tina and the Ikettes delivering gospel-influenced vocals.

The single peaked at No. 4 on the Billboard Hot 100 chart on March 27, 1971, two years after the original by Creedence Clearwater Revival was at its peak. It also reached No. 5 on the Billboard R&B chart, and earned the duo a Grammy Award for Best R&B Vocal Performance by a Group at the 14th Annual Grammy Awards in 1972.

Ike and Tina performed a version of the song on Playboy After Dark on December 3, 1969; episode aired on February 3, 1970. They also performed it on The Ed Sullivan Show on January 11, 1970; in the film It's Your Thing (1970); and on a Soul Train episode aired on April 22, 1972. The song became a staple in all of their live shows. Live versions of the song were released on the albums Live at Carnegie Hall (1971) and Live In Paris (1971).

The song continued to be an essential part of Tina's performances as a solo artist. In 1988, a live version was included on the album Tina Live in Europe. In the 1993 biopic What's Love Got to Do with It, the song is performed in a timeline of events in Ike (Laurence Fishburne) and Tina Turner (Angela Bassett)'s career in which the couple are transformed from an opening act for the Rolling Stones to a major headlining act in the 1970s. Tina re-recorded the song for the biopic's 1993 soundtrack album of the same name. This track was released as a promotional single issued to radio stations and DJs. Tina Turner's solo performance was later included on her 2004 greatest hits album All the Best. After contestants Diva Fever's take on the song on series 7 of The X Factor in 2010, it entered the UK Singles Chart at No. 62 and the Scottish Singles Chart at No. 40. Another live version was released in 2009 on the Tina Live album. It was recorded on March 21, 2009, in Arnhem, Netherlands as part of Turner's 50th Anniversary Tour. Tina also performed duets of "Proud Mary" with Beyoncé and Cher.

=== Critical reception ===
The song received positive reviews.

Billboard (January 23, 1971): "The John Fogerty classic gets a powerhouse treatment with the Turner originality and drive to put it back up the Hot 100 and soul charts. Dynamite entry."

Cash Box (January 23, 1971): "Slow intro almost belies the power that grows into this revival of the Creedence monument. R&B sales could build enough momentum to put the side into top forty again."

=== Formats and track listings ===
1971 US 7-inch

1. "Proud Mary" – 3:15
2. "Funkier Than a Mosquito's Tweeter" – 2:40

1993 US 7-inch and cassette single

1. "Proud Mary" (Edit Live Version) – 4:32
2. "The Best" (Live) – 5:22

1993 US CD single

1. "Proud Mary" (Edit Live Version) – 4:32
2. "Proud Mary" (Edit) – 4:10
3. "We Don't Need Another Hero (Thunderdome)" (Live) – 4:55
4. "The Best" (Live) – 5:22

=== Chart performance ===
==== Weekly charts ====
Ike and Tina Turner

Weekly chart performance for "Proud Mary" by Ike & Tina Turner
Chart (1971)	Peak position
Belgium (Ultratop 50 Flanders)	16
Canada Top Singles (RPM)	11
Netherlands (Single Top 100)	5
US Billboard Hot 100	4
US Billboard Soul Singles	5
US Cash Box Top 100	5
US Cash Box Top 60 R&B	4
US Record World Singles	6
US Record World R&B Singles	2
West Germany (GfK)	21

Tina Turner solo version

Weekly chart performance for "Proud Mary" by Tina Turner
Chart (2010–2023)	Peak position
Ireland (IRMA)	93
Scottish Singles Sales (Official Charts)	40
UK Singles (Official Charts)	44

==== Year-end charts ====
Year-end chart performance for "Proud Mary" by Ike & Tina Turner
Chart (1971)	Rank
Belgium (Ultratop 50 Flanders)	96
Netherlands (Single Top 100)	7
US Billboard Hot 100	55
US Cash Box Top 100	56
US Cash Box Top 100 R&B	32

=== Certifications ===
Certifications for "Proud Mary" by Ike & Tina Turner or Tina Turner
Region	Certification	Certified units/sales
New Zealand (RMNZ)	Platinum	30,000^{‡}
United Kingdom (BPI) Solo version	Platinum	600,000^{‡}
United States (RIAA) Duet version	Gold	1,000,000^{^}
^{^} Shipments figures based on certification alone.^{‡} Sales+streaming figures based on certification alone.

== Accolades ==
For their rendition, Ike & Tina Turner won a Grammy Award for Best R&B Vocal Performance by a Group in 1972. Both Creedence Clearwater Revival's and Ike & Tina Turner's versions of the song received Grammy Hall of Fame Awards, in 1998 and 2003, respectively. "Proud Mary" ranked at No. 155 on Rolling Stone's 2004 list of The 500 Greatest Songs of All Time.

== Other versions ==
In 1969, Anthony Armstrong Jones released a version of "Proud Mary" that reached No. 22 on the Billboard Hot Country Singles chart. The song served as the title track of his debut album.

In 1969, the duo Emerson & Waldron (Bill Emerson, Cliff Waldron) released a bluegrass version of the song.

In 1970, the song was recorded by Leonard Nimoy, in his album The New World of Leonard Nimoy.

In 1972, Brush Arbor released a version of "Proud Mary" that reached No. 56 on the Billboard Hot Country Singles chart.

Elvis Presley began incorporating "Proud Mary" into his live shows in 1970. Presley's version is a full-out rocker and is featured in his 1972 concert film Elvis on Tour, and on his live albums On Stage (1970) and As Recorded at Madison Square Garden (1972).

- Mi Banda El Mexicano recorded a version in spanish called «Orgullosa María», for their 1993 album Su Majestad Mi Banda El Mexicano Con Ustedes, similar to the Banda Pachuco recorded «María la Orgullosa», in their debut album Pachuco Bailarín, 1994.

The 2011 soundtrack to Bringing Up Bobby, an American comedy drama film, contained a Ukrainian language version of Proud Mary, performed by actress Milla Jovovich.

Prince performed a sample of "Proud Mary" during his 2007 Super Bowl XLI halftime Show performance.
