= Funkier Than a Mosquito's Tweeter (song) =

"Funkier Than a Mosquita's Tweeter"

Single by Ike & Tina Turner

from the album Workin' Together
- A-side: "Proud Mary"
- Released: January 1971
- Recorded: 1970
- Genre: Funk
- Length: 2:40
- Label: Liberty Records
- Songwriter(s): Alline Bullock
- Producer(s): Ike Turner

Ike & Tina Turner singles chronology
"Workin' Together" (1970)	"Funkier Than a Mosquita's Tweeter" (1971)	"Ooh Poo Pah Doo" (1971)

"Funkier Than a Mosquito's Tweeter" is a song written by Alline Bullock, sister of Tina Turner. It was first released by Ike & Tina Turner on their 1970 album Workin' Together with Tina Turner and the Ikettes on vocals. Mosquita's was the original spelling of Mosquito's, but after jazz singer Nina Simone released her version in 1974, most subsequent releases of the song have used the latter spelling including Ike & Tina Turner reissues.

"Funkier Than a Mosquita's Tweeter" was produced by Ike Turner and released as a B-side single to "Proud Mary" on Liberty Records in January 1971. This song is a scathing assessment of an unidentified man, opening with "you're nothin' but a dirty, dirty old man."

The song was used as the title for Ike & Tina Turner's 2002 compilation album Funkier Than a Mosquito's Tweeter.

== Nina Simone version ==
Nina Simone began performing a rendition of "Funkier Than a Mosquito's Tweeter" in 1971. She recorded her performance at New York's Philharmonic Hall in July 1973. It was released on her 1974 live album, It Is Finished, on RCA Records. Her version differs greatly from the original, using "special rhythmic effects on a variety of African and Eastern instruments." Simone's rendition has since become a classic and the best known version of the song. It is regarded as one of her best vocal performances. "Her voice cracks with exasperation, alluding that the predator she sings about might well be the good ol' US of A," observed Julianne Escobedo Shepherd for Pitchfork. Alex Deley at DJ D-Mac & Associates wrote, "Simone manages to transform the song into something even greater than the original, really digging deep and pulling out the righteous, accusatory essence of the song." A remixed version was released on the 2006 compilation album Remixed & Reimagined.
