= Funkier Than a Mosquito's Tweeter =

Compilation album by Ike & Tina Turner
- Released: July 2, 2002
- Recorded: 1969–1974
- Genre: Funk
- Label: Stateside
- Producer: Ike Turner

Ike & Tina Turner chronology
The Kent Years (2000)	Funkier Than a Mosquito's Tweeter (2002)	His Woman, Her Man: The Ike Turner Diaries (2004)

Professional ratings
Review scores
Source	Rating
AllMusic	4.5/5 stars

Funkier Than a Mosquito's Tweeter is a 2002 compilation album by Ike & Tina Turner released on Stateside Records. The songs were originally recorded from 1969 to 1974 and released on the albums Come Together (1970), Working Together (1970), 'Nuff Said (1971), Feel Good (1972), and Let Me Touch Your Mind (1973).

== Track listing ==
No.	Title	Writer(s)	Length
1.	"Funkier Than a Mosquito's Tweeter"	Alline Bullock	2:36
2.	"What You Don't See (Is Better Yet)"	Calvin Lane, Ike Turner, Tina Turner, Leon Ware	3:16
3.	"I Wanna Jump"	Ike Turner	2:33
4.	"I'm Just Not Ready for Love" (The Ikettes)	Ike Turner	2:15
5.	"Young and Dumb"	Ike Turner	2:52
6.	"The Game of Love"	Eki Renut	2:48
7.	"Whole Lotta Love" (From Tina Turner's solo album Acid Queen)	John Bonham, Willie Dixon, John Paul Jones, Jimmy Page, Robert Plant	4:42
8.	"I Love Baby"	Calvin Lane, Philip Reese, Ike Turner	2:22
9.	"Up on the Roof"	Gerry Goffin, Carole King	2:57
10.	"Too Much Woman (For a Hen Pecked Man)"	Ike Turner	2:35
11.	"Baby, What You Want Me to Do"	Alline Bullock	2:30
12.	"(Long as I Can) Get You When I Want You"	George Jackson, Raymond Moore	2:24
13.	"Bolic"	Tina Turner	2:30
14.	"Tell the Truth"	Ike Turner, Leon Ware	2:54
15.	"The Chopper"	Tina Turner	2:38
16.	"I Want to Take You Higher"	Sylvester Stewart	2:53
17.	"Doin' It"	Ike Turner	2:43
18.	"Can't You Hear Me Calling"	Leon Ware, Ike Turner	2:27
19.	"I Like It"	Tina Turner	1:59
20.	"Popcorn"	Tina Turner	3:09
21.	"Help Him"	Tina Turner	3:43
