= Let Me Touch Your Mind (song) =

- German picture sleeve

Single by Ike & Tina Turner

from the album Let Me Touch Your Mind
- B-side: "Chopper"
- Released: September 1972
- Recorded: June 1972
- Studio: Bolic Sound (Inglewood, California)
- Genre: R&B
- Length: 3:59
- Label: United Artists Records
- Songwriter: Oliver Sain
- Producers: I & TT Productions

Ike & Tina Turner singles chronology
"Feel Good" (1972)	"Let Me Touch Your Mind" (1972)	"Early One Morning" (1973)

"Let Me Touch Your Mind" is a song written by Oliver Sain. It was recorded and released by R&B duo Ike & Tina Turner on United Artists Records in 1972.

== Recording and release ==
"Let Me Touch Your Mind" was written by St. Louis musician Oliver Sain, who occasionally performed with Ike Turner's Kings of Rhythm. The song is a ballad about a plea to get a lover to let down their guard and be open with their feelings. Ike & Tina Turner recorded the track at their studio, Bolic Sound, in June 1972. The record was released in September 1972 as the lead single from their album Let Me Touch Your Mind. They promoted the song on The Tonight Show and The Dick Cavett Show in October 1972. It reached No. 30 on Record World's R&B chart. A live version was released on the album Live! The World of Ike & Tina (1973).

The B-side "Chopper," written by Tina Turner, is from their previous album, Feel Good. It later appeared on the compilation album Funkier Than a Mosquito's Tweeter (2002).

== Critical reception ==
The single received positive reviews.

Record World (September 23, 1972) "Electrifying act slows down for this powerful blues ballad along the lines of 'I've Been Loving You Too Long.' Tina gives another magnificently erotic performance."

Cash Box (September 23, 1972): "Little Anthony intro segues into dynamic blues outing that is certain to grab top 40 attention. Tina Turner is absolutely incredible as she'll make a believer out of anyone."

== Chart performance ==
Chart (1972)	Peak position
US Cash Box R&B Top 60	60
US Record World R&B Singles	30
US Record World Singles 101–150	118
