= Let Your Hair Down (album) =

Studio album by Steve Miller Band
- Released: April 19, 2011
- Recorded: 2008–2009
- Genre: Rock, blues rock
- Length: 30:43
- Label: Sailor/Loud & Proud/Roadrunner/Space Cowboy
- Producer: Steve Miller, Andy Johns

Steve Miller Band chronology
Bingo! (2010)	Let Your Hair Down (2011)

Let Your Hair Down is the seventeenth studio album by the Steve Miller Band, released on April 19, 2011.

Let Your Hair Down was recorded alongside the group's previous album, Bingo!, which was released 10 months earlier. Like Bingo!, this album is a collection of blues and R&B covers, and as of 2026, it is Steve Miller Band's most recent studio album.

Like Bingo, the artwork was designed by StormStudios, with a plethora of visual puns used in the pictures (the cover shows a man with no hair, but a hare sitting on his head, and a small ladder at the side).

Professional ratings
Review scores
Source	Rating
AllMusic	3.5/5 stars

== Track listing ==
No.	Title	Writer(s)	Length
1.	"Snatch It Back and Hold It"	Amos Blakemore, Buddy Guy	3:58
2.	"I Got Love If You Want It"	James H. Moore	2:30
3.	"Just a Little Bit"	Ralph Bass, Columbus Perry, John Thornton, Earl E. Washington	2:55
4.	"Close Together"	Jimmy Reed	2:53
5.	"No More Doggin'"	Rosco Gordon, Jules Taub	2:51
6.	"Pretty Thing"	Willie Dixon	2:56
7.	"Can't Be Satisfied"	Muddy Waters	3:40
8.	"Sweet Home Chicago"	Robert Johnson	2:41
9.	"Love the Life I Live"	Dixon	3:21
10.	"The Walk"	Jimmy McCracklin	2:58

Special edition bonus tracks
No.	Title	Writer(s)	Length
11.	"When Things Go Wrong (It Hurts Me Too)"	Mel London	2:40
12.	"I Ain't Got You"	Calvin Carter	1:45
13.	"Tell Me What's the Reason"	Florence Cadrez	3:09
14.	"Driftin' Blues"	Charles Brown, Eddie Williams, Johnny Moore	3:32

== Personnel ==
- Steve Miller – lead guitar, vocals
- Norton Buffalo – harmonica, vocals
- Kenny Lee Lewis – rhythm guitar, vocals
- Joseph Wooten – Hammond B-3, piano, keyboards, vocals
- Gordy Knudtson – drums
- Billy Peterson – bass guitar, vocals
- Sonny Charles – vocals

Additional personnel

- Michael Carabello – congas, percussion
- Adrian Areas – timbales, percussion

== Charts ==
Chart performance for Let Your Hair Down
Chart (2011)	Peak position
Dutch Albums (Album Top 100)	77
US Billboard 200	180
