= Playboy After Dark =

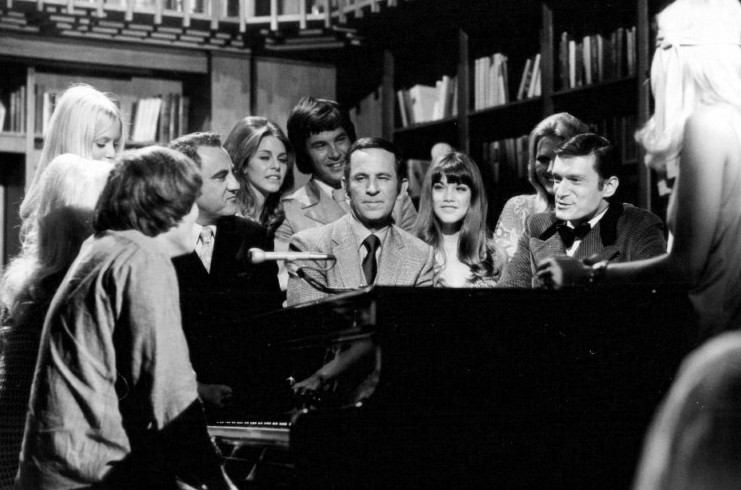
- Comedian Bill Dana, actor Don Adams, Playmate Barbi Benton, and Hugh Hefner. Center back, actress Lindsay Wagner, and scientist Yorick Wilks, 1969.
- Genre: Variety
- Starring: Hugh Hefner
- Opening theme: "Playboy's Theme" by Cy Coleman
- Country of origin: United States
- Original language: English
- No. of seasons: 2
- No. of episodes: 52

Production
- Running time: 48 mins.
- Production company: Playboy Enterprises

Original release
- Network: Syndicated
- Release: January 18, 1969 – August 25, 1970

Playboy After Dark is an American television show hosted by Hugh Hefner. It aired in syndication through Screen Gems from 1969 to 1970 and was taped at CBS Television City in Los Angeles.

== Overview ==
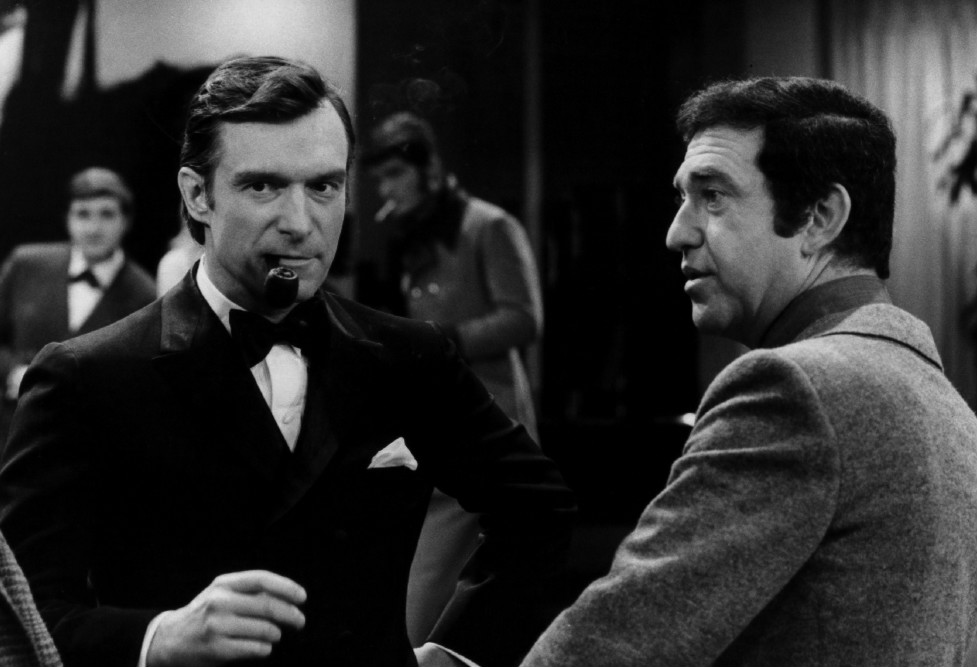
Hugh Hefner and Soupy Sales, 1969.

Playboy After Dark followed much the same style as Hefner's earlier show, Playboy's Penthouse (1959–1960), which had been taped at WBKB-TV in Chicago. The show portrayed a "typical" party at Hefner's place, complete with Playboy Playmates and celebrities, who then chatted with Hefner and performed for the party.

== Season 1 ==
Episode	Original airdate	Guests	Taped
1	January 18, 1969	Rowan & Martin, Stu Gilliam, Cathy Carlson, Paul Hampton, The Clara Ward Singers	October 22, 1968
2	January 31, 1969	Bill Cosby, Bill Medley, Iron Butterfly, Kaye Stevens, The Blossoms, Shel Silverstein, Reverend Malcolm Boyd	August 8, 1968
3	February 2, 1969	Tony Bennett, Steppenwolf, Milt Kamen, Morgana King, George Plimpton, Irwin Corey	August 9, 1968
4	February 7, 1969	Roman Polanski, Sharon Tate, Della Reese, Vic Damone, Don Adams, Bill Dana, Jackie Gayle, The Collectors	July 24, 1968
5	February 15, 1969	Norm Crosby, Rich Little, Otto Preminger, Harry Nilsson, The Pair Extraordinaire, Carol Channing, The Brothers Castro	August 30, 1968
6	February 21, 1969	Tommy Smothers, Buffy St. Marie, Louis Nye, John Stewart, Dr. William Schultz, The Buddy Miles Express	September 29, 1968
7	March 1, 1969	Don Adams, Larry Hankin, David Hemmings, Gayle Hunnicutt, Tommy Smothers, Joan Baez, The Avant-Garde featuring Chuck Woolery	November 11, 1968
8	March 7, 1969	The Checkmates, Bill Cosby, Sammy Davis Jr., Peter Lawford, Jerry Lewis, Leroy Neiman, Anthony Newley	December 19, 1968
9	March 15, 1969	The Checkmates, Gloria Loring, Jimmy Webb, Harry Blackstone Jr., Hendra & Ullett	September 13, 1968
10	March 21, 1969	Melvin Belli, The Checkmates, The Collage, Bill Cosby, Bob Fuller, Kelly Garrett, Shecky Greene, Doug McClure, Don Rickles	November 26, 1968
11	March 22, 1969	Sid Caesar, Elias & Shaw, The Grateful Dead, Brendan Hanlon, Noel Harrison, Sydney Omarr	January 18, 1969
12	March 28, 1969	Pat Collins, Gore Vidal, John Hartford, Three Dog Night, Morgana King	November 10, 1968
13	March 29, 1969	Bob Newhart, O.C. Smith, Bill Cosby, Gary LeMel, The Pickle Brothers, Rod Piazza Group, George Chakos	September 9, 1968
14	April 11, 1969	Bill Cosby, Jackie DeShannon, Jim Brown, Louis Belson, Marty Ingels, Taj Mahal, Jeremy Vernon, Deep Purple	October 16, 1968
15	April 12, 1969	Buddy Rich, James Cotton Blues Band, Joe Williams, Sue Raney, Pat McCormick, Ray Hastings	August 29, 1968
16	April 18, 1969	Shelley Berman, Buddy Miles Express, Lou Rawls, Joanie Sommers, David Steinberg, The Times Square Two	December 10, 1968
17	May 2, 1969	Bill Cosby, Jack Carter, Soupy Sales, Clay Tyson, James Brown, Three Dog Night, Marva Whitney	November 25, 1968
18	May 9, 1969	Pete Seeger, Bill Cosby, Jack E. Leonard, Carmen McRae, Teddy Neely	October 15, 1968
19	May 16, 1969	Canned Heat, Colvin & Wilder, Buddy Greco, Johnny Janis, Shari Lewis, Max Lerner	January 20, 1969
20	May 30, 1969	Pete Barbuti, The Committee, Pat Henry, Sally Marr, Marvin Gaye, The Byrds	September 28, 1968
21	May 31, 1969	Sammy Bow, Bobby Doyle, Billy Eckstine, The Grass Roots, Rich Little, Paul Mazursky, Larry Tucker	December 17, 1968
22	June 28, 1969	Shelley Berman, Pat Morita, The Nitty Gritty Dirt Band, Frankie Randall, Lou Rawls, Second City	December 11, 1968
23	July 19, 1969	Dr. George R. Bach, Michael Caine, Meredith MacRae, Greg Mullavey, Sir Douglas Quintet, Mort Sahl, Sammy Shore, The Clara Ward Singers	January 25, 1969
24	October 10, 1969	Johnny Mathis, Mort Sahl, The Chambers Brothers, Bill Russell, Corbett Monica, Nadia Christen	July 23, 1968
25	November 7, 1969	Joey Bishop, Skiles & Henderson, Steppenwolf, Joe Williams, Joanne Vent	January 26, 1969
26	November 14, 1969	Don Adams, Jackie Gayle, David Hemmings, Gayle Hunnicutt, Brenton Wood, Deep Purple, Lynn Kellogg	October 23, 1968

== Season 2 ==
Episode	Original airdate	Guests	Taped
1	January 27, 1970	Canned Heat, Vic Damone, Dick Shawn, Sonny & Cher, Larry Storch	November 20, 1969
2	February 3, 1970	Ike & Tina Turner Revue, Patty Duke, Doug Kershaw, Louis Nye, Rex Reed	December 3, 1969
3	February 10, 1970	Tony Bennett, George Kirby, Moe Koffman, Mitch Miller, Joe Williams	November 20, 1969
4	February 17, 1970	Don Adams, Fleetwood Mac, Arte Johnson, Tommy Leonetti, Lesley Gore	January 8, 1970
5	February 24, 1970	Cannonball Adderley Quintet, Grand Funk Railroad, Tony Randall, Lou Rawls, Art Metrano	December 3, 1969
6	March 3, 1970	Steve Allen, The Blossoms, Clair & McMahon, O.C. Smith, Nitty Gritty Dirt Band	December 17, 1969
7	March 10, 1970	Don Adams, The Amazing Kreskin, The Checkmates, Bill Dana, Biff Rose, Carla Thomas	November 5, 1969
8	March 17, 1970	Dolores Hall, John Hartford, Mitzi McCall & Charlie Brill, Steppenwolf	December 17, 1969
9	March 24, 1970	Vicki Anderson, James Brown, The Chambers Brothers, Norm Crosby, Jack Jones	January 7, 1970
10	March 31, 1970	Angeline Butler, Bill Cosby, Bill Medley, Scoey Mitchell, Hugh O'Brian, Sweetwater	October 23, 1969
11	April 7, 1970	Sid Caesar, Joe Cocker & The Grease Band, Billy Eckstine, Linda Ronstadt, Mort Sahl	October 22, 1969
12	April 14, 1970	Milton Berle, Barrie Chase, Muscatel, Tony Joe White, Jo Anne Worley	February 18, 1970
13	April 21, 1970	Vic Damone, Noel Harrison, Lloyd Haynes, Marty Ingels, Smokey Robinson & The Miracles, Evie Sands	February 20, 1970
14	April 28, 1970	Johnny Mathis, Modern Jazz Quartet, John Stewart, George Carlin	March 18, 1970
15	May 5, 1970	Alan and Marilyn Bergman, Robert Goulet, Michel Legrand, Shari Lewis, Rich Little, Frankie Randall	March 3, 1970
16	May 12, 1970	Edie Adams, Bill Cosby, Robert Clary, The Grass Roots, Les McCann Ltd., Frankie Randall	March 19, 1970
17	May 19, 1970	Jackie Gayle, R.B. Greaves, The Jet Bunnies, Trini Lopez, Frankie Randall, Sarah Vaughan	March 20, 1970
18	May 26, 1970	The Dillards, John Gary, Carmen McRae	April 1, 1970
19	June 2, 1970	Sonny Charles, Sandy Baron, Lola Falana, Don Ho, Pat Paulson	April 2, 1970
20	June 9, 1970	Country Joe & the Fish, Linda Ronstadt	April 16, 1970
21	July 14, 1970	Pete Barbutti, B.B. King, Mitzi McCall & Charlie Brill, Barbara McNair, Mel Tormé	April 15, 1970
22	July 18, 1970	Rich Little, Fran Jeffries, Buddy Miles Band, Belland & Somerville, Vic Damone	April 29, 1970
24	July 21, 1970	Sammy Davis Jr., Moms Mabley, Bill Medley, Billy Preston	April 20, 1970
25	August 11, 1970	The Cowsills, Nanci Roberts, Marty Allen, Frankie Laine, Sue Raney	May 14, 1970
26	August 25, 1970	Spanky Wilson, Lou Rawls, Bossa Rio, Sandy Baron, Connie Kresk, Sandy Baron and George Carlin	April 30, 1970

== DVD release ==
Two volumes of the best of Playboy After Dark have been released on DVD.
