= Horace Faith =

Jamaican reggae singer

- Born: Horace Smith; Jamaica
- Died: 7 March 2015
- Genres: Reggae
- Occupation: Singer
- Instrument: Vocals
- Years active: 1970s
- Labels: B&C, Trojan, A&M, DJM

Horace Faith (born Horace Smith) was a Jamaican reggae singer. He is best known for his cover of the Checkmates, Ltd. song, "Black Pearl", which reached number 13 on the UK Singles Chart in 1970.

Released by Trojan Records (TR 7790), "Black Pearl" spent ten weeks on the UK Singles Chart in the latter half of 1970, peaking at number 13 in October that year. Coincidentally, the original version of the song by Checkmates, Ltd., peaked at number 13 in the US Billboard Hot 100 in 1969. The track was written by Irwin Levine, Phil Spector and Toni Wine. The B-side of Faith's single was "Help Me Help Myself", which was written by Johnny Arthey and Phil Swern. The single was released in the United States by Bell Records.

"Black Pearl" subsequently appeared on numerous compilation albums.

Faith's later recordings included the self-penned "I Can't Understand It", arranged by Richard Anthony Hewson and produced by Swern.

Faith died on 7 March 2015.

== Discography ==
Year	Title	Record label	UK
1969	"Spinning Wheel"	B&C	—
1970	"Black Pearl"	Trojan	13
1970	"Susie Is Tomorrow"	Trojan	—
1972	"Shame and Scandal in the Family"	A&M	—
1976	"I Can't Understand It"	DJM	—
1978	"Rich Man Poor Man"	Ultra	—
1978	"Looking"	Anansi	—
"—" denotes releases that did not chart.

== See also ==
- List of Jamaicans
