= Love Is All We Have to Give =

Studio album by Checkmates, Ltd.
- Released: 1969
- Genre: Soul
- Length: 38:28
- Label: A&M 4183
- Producer: Phil Spector

Checkmates, Ltd. chronology
Live! At Caesar's Palace (1967)	Love Is All We Have to Give (1969)	Life (1971)

Singles from Love Is All We Have to Give
- 1. "Love Is All I Have to Give"/"Never Should Have Lied" Released: March 1969; 2. "Black Pearl"/"Lazy Susan" Released: April 1969; 3. "Proud Mary"/"Spanish Harlem" Released: September 1969; 4. "I Keep Forgettin'"/"Do You Love Your Baby" Released: 1970

Professional ratings
Review scores
Source	Rating
AllMusic	4/5 stars
The Village Voice	C+

Love Is All We Have to Give is the first studio album by Checkmates, Ltd., released in 1969, and their second overall album after the 1967 live album Live! at Caesar's Palace. Love Is All We Have to Give reached No. 178 on the Billboard Top LPs chart.

The album featured four singles: "Black Pearl", which reached No. 8 on the R&B chart and No. 13 on the Billboard Hot 100, "Proud Mary", which reached No. 69 on the Billboard Hot 100, "Love Is All I Have to Give" which reached No. 65 on the Hot 100, and "I Keep Forgettin'" which did not chart on the pop chart.

== Track listing ==
1. "Proud Mary" (John Fogerty) – 4:30
2. "Spanish Harlem" (Jerry Leiber, Mike Stoller, Phil Spector) – 3:17
3. "Black Pearl" (Phil Spector, Toni Wine, Irwin Levine) – 3:25
4. "I Keep Forgettin'" (Jerry Leiber, Mike Stoller) – 3:03
5. "Love Is All I Have to Give" (Bobby Stevens, Phil Spector) – 4:13
6. The Hair Anthology Suite: "Ain't Got No/I Got Life/Prelude/Theme/Postlude/Let The Sunshine (Overture)/Prelude/Aquarius/Prelude/Theme/Let The Sunshine In/Ain't Got No (Finale)/Prelude/Postlude" (James Rado, Gerome Ragni, Galt MacDermot) – 20:00

== Personnel ==
- Phil Spector - producer
- Perry Botkin Jr. (Tracks 1–5), Dee Barton (Track 1, 2, 4, 6) - arrangements and conductor
- Sonny Charles (Tracks 1–4, 6), Bobby Stevens (Tracks 5–6) - lead vocals
- Harvey Trees - lead guitar
- Bill Van Buskirk - electric bass
- Marvin "Sweet Louie" Smith - drums

== Charts ==
Chart (1969)	Peak position
US Pop	178

Singles

Year	Single	Chart	Position
1969	"Black Pearl"	US Pop	13
1969	"Black Pearl"	US R&B	8
1969	"Black Pearl"	AUS	31
1969	"Love Is All I Have to Give"	AUS	31
1969	"Proud Mary"	US Pop	69
1969	"Proud Mary"	UK	30
