= Bingo! (album) =

Studio album by Steve Miller Band
- Released: June 15, 2010
- Recorded: 2008–2009
- Genres: Rock, blues rock
- Length: 32:04
- Labels: Roadrunner, Loud & Proud
- Producers: Steve Miller, Andy Johns

Steve Miller Band chronology
Wide River (1993)	Bingo! (2010)	Let Your Hair Down (2011)

Bingo! is the sixteenth studio album by the Steve Miller Band. The album was released on June 15, 2010, by Roadrunner Records and Loud & Proud.

The album is the first studio release by the band since 1993's Wide River. It was recorded alongside a second album which was released 10 months later. The album is dedicated in memory of Norton Buffalo, who died on October 30, 2009. The first single, "Hey Yeah", was available to stream online in April 2010 and available to purchase on May 18, 2010.

== Background and production ==
The album was recorded, beginning in 2008, at Skywalker Studios, the studio owned by filmmaker George Lucas and was produced by Miller and Andy Johns.

The album features cover versions of songs by artists such as B.B. King, Lowell Fulson, Jimmy Reed, and Jimmie Vaughan.

Miller said of the album, "This is a party record, man. It's about getting up and getting ready to dance. It's like the fraternity party gigs I used to play in college. I went through and picked all my favorite tunes that I really, really loved. I wanted to make this record forever; it started off as just kind of a goof, and then it got real serious."

Professional ratings
Review scores
Source	Rating
AllMusic	3.5/5 stars
Mojo Radio	(8.7/10)
Rolling Stone	3.5/5 stars

== Track listing ==
No.	Title	Writer(s)	Length
1.	"Hey Yeah"	Paul Henry Ray, Jimmie Vaughan	3:16
2.	"Who's Been Talkin'?"	Chester Burnett	3:03
3.	"Don't Cha Know"	Vaughan	3:12
4.	"Rock Me Baby"	Joe Josea, B.B. King	3:47
5.	"Tramp"	Lowell Fulson, Jimmy McCracklin	3:26
6.	"Sweet Soul Vibe"	Nile Rodgers, Vaughan	3:38
7.	"Come On (Let the Good Times Roll)"	Earl King	2:38
8.	"All Your Love (I Miss Loving)"	Otis Rush	3:11
9.	"You Got Me Dizzy"	Jimmy Reed, Ewart G. Abner Jr.	2:22
10.	"Ooh Poo Pah Doo"	Jessie Hill	3:31

Special edition bonus tracks
No.	Title	Writer(s)	Length
11.	"Ain't That Lovin' You Baby"	Reed	2:22
12.	"Further on Up the Road"	Don D. Robey, Joe M. Veasey	2:34
13.	"Look on Yonder Wall"	Elmore James, Marshall Sehorn	3:08
14.	"Drivin' Wheel"	Roosevelt Sykes	3:38

== Personnel ==
- Steve Miller – lead guitar, vocals
- Norton Buffalo – harmonica, vocals
- Kenny Lee Lewis – rhythm guitar, vocals
- Joseph Wooten – Hammond B-3, piano, keyboards, vocals
- Gordy Knudtson – drums
- Billy Peterson – bass guitar, vocals
- Sonny Charles – vocals

Additional personnel

- Joe Satriani – solos with Steve Miller on "Rock Me Baby" and "Sweet Soul Vibe"
- Michael Carabello – congas, percussion on "All Your Love (I Miss Loving)"
- Adrian Areas – timbales, percussion on "All Your Love (I Miss Loving)"

== Charts ==
Chart performance for Bingo!
Chart (2010)	Peak position
Belgian Albums (Ultratop Flanders)	75
Dutch Albums (Album Top 100)	70
German Albums (Offizielle Top 100)	68
US Billboard 200	37
