= I Keep Forgettin' =

Single by Chuck Jackson

from the album Any Day Now
- B-side: "Who's Gonna Pick Up the Pieces"
- Released: 1962
- Recorded: 1962
- Studio: Bell Sound (New York City)
- Genre: R&B; soul
- Length: 2:43
- Label: Wand; Stateside
- Songwriters: Jerry Leiber; Mike Stoller; Gilbert Garfield
- Producers: Jerry Leiber; Mike Stoller

Chuck Jackson singles chronology
"Come On and Love Me" (1962)	"I Keep Forgettin'" (1962)	"Who's Gonna Pick Up the Pieces" (1962)

"I Keep Forgettin" is a song by Chuck Jackson, written by Jerry Leiber, Mike Stoller, and Gilbert Garfield. It appears on his second studio album Any Day Now. It peaked at No. 55 on the Billboard Top 100 and remained on the chart for 7 weeks. It did not chart on the R&B chart. This single is often cited as one of the most innovative yet least commercial singles written and produced by Leiber-Stoller.

In 1982, Michael McDonald released a song titled "I Keep Forgettin' (Every Time You're Near)". The song's similarity to Jackson's "I Keep Forgettin'" resulted in Leiber and Stoller being given a songwriting credit.

== Track listing and formats ==
- US 7" Vinyl single

A. "I Keep Forgettin'" – 2:43
B. "Who's Gonna Pick Up the Pieces" – 2:47

== Charts ==
Chart (1962)	Peak position
US Billboard Hot 100	55

== Cover versions ==
- The Artwoods recorded a version of the song for their 1966 album Art Gallery.
- Checkmates, Ltd. featuring lead singer Sonny Charles recorded a version for their 1969 album Love Is All We Have to Give produced by Phil Spector. They released it as a single in 1970, but it did not chart.
- Procol Harum recorded a version of the song. It appeared on the album Procol's Ninth, released in 1975 and produced by Leiber/Stoller.
- Roger Chapman recorded a live version for his 1979 album Live in Hamburg.
- Ringo Starr recorded a version of the song for his 1983 album Old Wave.
- David Bowie recorded a version of the song for his 1984 album Tonight.
- Joe Cocker recorded a version of the song for his 2004 album Heart & Soul.
