= Live! at Caesar's Palace =

Live album by Checkmates, Ltd.
- Released: 1967
- Genre: Soul
- Length: 42:11
- Label: Capitol
- Producer: Kelly Gordon

Checkmates, Ltd. chronology
Live! at Caesar's Palace (1967)	Love Is All We Have to Give (1969)

Professional ratings
Review scores
Source	Rating
AllMusic	3/5 stars

Live! at Caesar's Palace is the debut album by Checkmates, Ltd., released in 1967. It reached No. 36 on the U.S. R&B chart.

== Track listing ==
Songs 1-7 are part of a medley:

1. "What'd I Say" (Ray Charles)
2. "Can I Get a Witness" (Brian Holland/Lamont Dozier/Eddie Holland)
3. "Bread and Butter" (Larry Parks, Jay Turnbow)
4. "Little Bitty Pretty One" (Bobby Day)
5. "Rockin' Robin" (Jimmie Thomas)
6. "Everybody Loves a Lover" (Robert Allen/Richard Adler)
7. "Mr. Lee" (The Bobbettes) – 5:45
8. "Sunny" (Bobby Hebb) – 4:44
9. "A Quitter Never Wins" (Willie Hooks) – 3:43
10. "You've Lost That Lovin' Feelin'" (Phil Spector/Barry Mann/Cynthia Weil) – 6:06
11. "Show Me" (Joe Tex) – 3:49
12. "Ebb Tide" (Robert Maxwell/Carl Sigman) – 5:00
13. "Hold On, I'm Comin'" (Isaac Hayes/David Porter) – 5:00
14. "Baby, I Need Your Lovin'" (Holland/Dozier/Holland) – 10:28

== Personnel ==
- Kelly Gordon – producer

== Charts ==
Chart (1967)	Peak position
US R&B	36
