= Live! The World of Ike & Tina =

Live album by Ike & Tina Turner
- Released: September 1973
- Length: 72:30
- Label: United Artists
- Producer: Ike Turner; Jackie Clark; Soko Richardson; Warren Dawson

Ike & Tina Turner chronology
Let Me Touch Your Mind (1973)	Live! The World of Ike & Tina (1973)	Nutbush City Limits (1973)

Singles from Live! The World of Ike & Tina
- 1. "With A Little Help From My Friends" Released: January 1973

Live! The World of Ike & Tina is a live double album released by Ike & Tina Turner on United Artists Records in 1973.

== Recording and release ==
Live! The World of Ike & Tina was recorded in various cities during Ike & Tina Turner's European tour. It was produced by Ike Turner, Jackie Clark, Soko Richardson, and Warren Dawson; mixed by Ike and John Mills.

The album showcases Ike & Tina Turner's forte of covering different genres of music. The songs on the album range from the rock of the Beatles and the Rolling Stones to the R&B of Hank Ballard to the blues of Elmore James. It also contains original compositions by the Turners.

Their rendition of "With a Little Help From My Friends" was released as a single in January 1973.

The album was released in September 1973. It peaked at No. 47 on the Billboard Soul LPs chart and No. 211 on Bubbling Under The Top LPs.

== Critical reception ==
The album received positive reviews.

Record World (September 8, 1973): "The spectacular musical & sexual excitement generated by Ike & Tina explodes from a fabulous double-album recorded scorchingly live throughout Europe. Rough raunchy rockers include 'She Came In Through the Bathroom Window', 'Stand by Me', and 'Honky Tonk Woman'. Dynamite!"

Billboard (September 8, 1973):

The special magic of the Ike and Tina Turner Show always seems to shine through best on their 'live' outings, where crowd response can be heard and the team can make improvisations. Ike and Tina are a highly visual as well as musical act, and their impact is stronger on sets such as this. In this double set, Tina is as strong and lusty voiced as ever. The band is tight and Ike contributes strongly with his vocals and arrangements.

== Awards and nominations ==
The gatefold cover was illustrated by Mike Salisbury which was nominated for a Grammy for Best Album Package at the 16th Annual Grammy Awards.

== Reissues ==
Live! The World of Ike & Tina was digitally remastered and released on CD by BGO Records in 2018.

== Track listing ==
Side A
No.	Title	Writer(s)	Length
1.	"Theme from 'Shaft'"	Isaac Hayes	5:32
2.	"I Gotcha"	Joe Tex	4:05
3.	"Intro to Tina"		1:24
4.	"She Came In Through the Bathroom Window"	Lennon-McCartney	2:17
5.	"You're Still My Baby"	Chuck Willis	3:00
6.	"Don't Fight It"	Steve Cropper, Wilson Pickett	2:40

Side B
No.	Title	Writer(s)	Length
1.	"Annie Had a Baby"	Henry Glover, Lois Mann	3:10
2.	"With a Little Help from My Friends"	Lennon-McCartney	3:17
3.	"Get Back"	Lennon-McCartney	3:07
4.	"Games People Play"	Joe South	3:18
5.	"Honky Tonk Women"	Keith Richards, Mick Jagger	3:09

Side C
No.	Title	Writer(s)	Length
1.	"If You Love Me Like You Say (You Wouldn't Treat Me Like You Do)"	Ike Turner	2:43
2.	"I Can't Turn You Loose"	Otis Redding	3:00
3.	"I Wish It Would Rain"	Norman Whitfield, Barrett Strong, Rodger Penzabene	3:29
4.	"Just One More Day"	Otis Redding, Steve Cropper, McElvoy Robinson	3:35
5.	"Stand by Me"	Ben E. King, Elmo Glick	4:00

Side D
No.	Title	Writer(s)	Length
1.	"Dust My Broom"	Elmore James	3:30
2.	"River Deep, Mountain High"	Phil Spector, Jeff Barry, Ellie Greenwich	2:14
3.	"Let Me Touch Your Mind"	Oliver Sain	4:10
4.	"Chopper"	Tina Turner	3:00
5.	"1-2-3"	John Madara, David White, Len Borisoff	4:40

== Chart performance ==
Chart (1973)	Peak position
US Billboard Bubbling Under Top LPs	211
US Billboard Soul LPs	47
US Cash Box Top 100 Albums 101–175	140
