= Black Smith (album) =

Studio album by Jimmy Smith
- Released: November 1974
- Recorded: 1974
- Genre: Jazz-funk, jazz fusion
- Label: Pride/MGM
- Producer: Jerry Peters, Michael Viner

Jimmy Smith chronology
Paid in Full (1974)	Black Smith (1974)	Jimmy Smith '75 (1975)

Professional ratings
Review scores
Source	Rating
Allmusic	link

Black Smith is a 1974 album by jazz musician Jimmy Smith. It was produced by Jerry Peters and Michael Viner.

== Track listing ==
1. "Hang 'Em High" (Dominique Frontiere) - 6:17
2. "I'm Gonna Love You Just a Little Bit More Baby" (Barry White) - 4:31
3. "Joy" (Johann Sebastian Bach) - 3:30
4. "Ooh Poo Pah Doo" (Jessie Hill) - 3:11
5. "Why Can't We Live Together" (Timmy Thomas) - 5:26
6. "Groovin'" (Eddie Brigati, Felix Cavaliere) - 3:03
7. "Pipeline" (Bob Spickard, Brian Carman) - 7:58
8. "Wildflower" (David Richardson, Doug Edwards) - 6:05
9. "Something You Got" (Chris Kenner) - 4:00
