= Black Pearl (song) =

Single by Checkmates, Ltd.

from the album Love Is All We Have to Give
- B-side: "Lazy Susan"
- Released: April 1969 (US); July 1969 (AUS)
- Genre: Soul
- Length: 3:25
- Label: A&M 1053 (U.S.); A&M 2985 (AUS)
- Songwriters: Phil Spector, Toni Wine, Irwin Levine
- Producer: Phil Spector

Checkmates, Ltd. singles chronology
"Love Is All I Have to Give" (1969)	"Black Pearl" (1969)	"Proud Mary" (1969)

"Black Pearl" is a song written by Phil Spector, Toni Wine, and Irwin Levine, and performed by Sonny Charles and the Checkmates, Ltd. It was inspired by the 1968 Sidney Poitier film For Love of Ivy, about Ivy Moore, a maid who, after nine years of service, leaves to go to secretarial school. The song reached No. 8 on the U.S. R&B chart, No. 13 on the Billboard pop chart, and No. 31 in Australia in 1969. The song was featured on the group's 1969 album, Love Is All We Have to Give.

The song was produced by Phil Spector and arranged by Perry Botkin, Jr. AllMusic described it as "one of the great Phil Spector productions, a phenomenal song with his extraordinary sound."

The single ranked No. 66 on Billboard's Year-End Hot 100 singles of 1969.

== Charts ==
=== Weekly charts ===
Chart (1969)	Peak position
Australia (Go-Set)	23
Australia (Kent Music Report)	31
Canada RPM Top Singles	8
New Zealand (Listener)	5
US Billboard Hot 100	13
US R&B (Billboard)	8
US Cash Box Top 100	10

=== Year-end charts ===
Chart (1969)	Rank
Canada Top Singles (RPM)	74
US Billboard Hot 100	66
US Cash Box Top 100	76

== Other versions ==
- Horace Faith released a version of the song as a single in 1970 which reached No. 13 on the UK Singles Chart.
- New Zealand group Moana and the Moahunters covered the song for their debut album, Tahi. It peaked at No. 2 on the New Zealand music charts in 1991.
