= Early One Morning (Little Richard song) =

1958 blues rock song by Little Richard

Single by Little Richard

from the album The Fabulous Little Richard
- A-side: "She Knows How to Rock"
- Released: November 1958
- Genre: Blues rock, rock n roll
- Length: 2:12
- Label: Specialty Records
- Songwriter: Richard Penniman

Little Richard singles chronology
"Baby Face" (1958)	"Early One Morning" (1958)	"By the Light of the Silvery Moon" (1959)

"Early One Morning"
- German picture sleeve

Single by Ike & Tina Turner

from the album Let Me Touch Your Mind
- A-side: "With a Little Help from My Friends"
- Released: January 1973
- Recorded: July 1972
- Studio: Bolic Sound (Inglewood, CA)
- Genre: Soul, R&B
- Length: 3:38
- Label: United Artists Records
- Songwriters: Roger Whittaker (credited), Richard Penniman (uncredited)
- Producers: Ike Turner, Soko Richardson, Warren Dawson

Ike & Tina Turner singles chronology
"Let Me Touch Your Mind" (1972)	"Early One Morning" (1973)	"Work On Me" (1973)

"Early One Morning" is a blues rock song written by Little Richard. It was originally released on his album The Fabulous Little Richard, and released by Specialty Records as a B-side single to "She Knows How to Rock" in November 1958. The song derives from "Wee Baby Blues" by Big Joe Turner. Turner's version features Ray Charles on piano, and was released as a single on Atlantic Records in 1957.

== Critical reception ==
Billboard (November 17, 1958):

The shoutin' cat is at his best on these sides. "Early One Morning," the great blues standard, is given a wild reading against driving ork support. "She knows," the flip, is a fast blues swinger that is also solidly belted. Both sides are safe bets to score heavily in both pop and r.&b. marts.

== Ike & Tina Turner version ==
Ike & Tina Turner recorded a version of "Early One Morning" for their 1973 album Let Me Touch Your Mind. Their rendition was released by United Artists Records as the B-side to the non-album track "With A Little Help From My Friends." While the A-side didn't chart, "Early One Morning" reached No. 47 on the Billboard R&B chart and No. 60 on the Cash Box R&B chart.

=== Chart performance ===
Chart (1973)	Peak position
US Billboard Soul Singles	47
US Cash Box R&B Top 65	60
US Record World R&B Singles	52

== Other versions ==
- Mo Jo Buford Blues Band released a version as a single in 1977
- The Zombies performed a version which was released on the album Live on The BBC (1985)
