= Workin' Together =

Studio album by Ike & Tina Turner
- Released: November 9, 1970
- Recorded: 1970
- Studio: Bolic Sound (Inglewood, CA)
- Length: 34:23
- Label: Liberty
- Producer: Ike Turner

Ike & Tina Turner chronology
Come Together (1970)	Workin' Together (1970)	Her Man . . . His Woman (1971)

Singles from Workin' Together
- 1. "Workin' Together" Released: October 1970; 2. "Proud Mary" Released: January 14, 1971; 3. "Ooh Poo Pah Doo" Released: April 1971; 4. "Get Back" Released: November 1972

Workin' Together is a studio album released by Ike & Tina Turner on Liberty Records on November 9, 1970. This was their second album with Liberty and their most successful studio album. The album contains their Grammy Award-winning single "Proud Mary."

== Content and release ==
Much like their previous album, Come Together, the album features soul-infused covers of rock songs and renewed versions of previous Ike & Tina songs. The album featured the duo's biggest-selling hit, a funk rock cover of "Proud Mary." The B-side, "Funkier Than a Mosquita's Tweeter", was written by Tina's sister Alline Bullock and later covered by Nina Simone. Several of the songs were written by Ike (including two by "Eki Renrut", which is Ike Turner spelled backward), including "The Way You Love Me", which the Turners had recorded for their debut album, The Soul of Ike & Tina Turner, nearly a decade earlier.

Three singles were released from the album in the US. The title track, "Workin' Together," peaked at No. 41 on the Billboard R&B chart and No. 105 on Bubbling Under The Hot 100. The second single, a cover of "Proud Mary" by Creedence Clearwater Revival, became the duo's biggest hit. It peaked at No. 4 on the Hot 100 chart and reached No. 5 on the R&B chart. It also earned Ike and Tina a Grammy Award for Best R&B Vocal Performance by a Group in 1972. The third single, a cover of "Ooh Poo Pah Doo" by Jessie Hill, peaked at No. 31 on the R&B chart and No. 60 on the Hot 100. A fourth single, a cover of "Get Back" by the Beatles, was released in Germany.

== Critical reception ==
Professional ratings
Review scores
Source	Rating
Allmusic	4.5/5 stars
Christgau's Record Guide	B

The album received positive reviews. Thomas Popson wrote for the Chicago Tribune that Workin' Together is "another fine album from two thoroughly professional entertainers."

Billboard (November 21, 1970):

Nobody works harder than Ike & Tina Turner and workin' together they take top material, rip it up, and resoul "Proud Mary," "Let It Be," "Get Back" and "Ooh Poo Pah Doo" their way. The duo gather a full head of funky, raucous steam, hitting only the heights of energy and excitement on the title romp, plus more of Ike's super rhythm workouts. Can't keep this kind of "up" music down.

San Francisco Examiner (November 29, 1970): "Ike and Tina's latest album ... is a superb example of how they combine rock and soul elements. Probably the most musically balanced record of their career, and one of the best pop discs of the year."

== Awards ==
In 1971, Ike & Tina Turner won the Prix Otis Redding (best R&B album) from the Académie du Jazz for Workin' Together.

== Reissues ==
Workin' Together was digitally remastered and released by BGO records on the compilation CD Workin' Together/Let Me Touch Your Mind in 2011. The album was reissued on vinyl in 2016.

== Track listing ==
All tracks written by Ike Turner, except where noted. Tracks 1 and 6 were credited to "Eki Renrut" (Ike Turner backwards).

No.	Title	Writer(s)	Length
1.	"Workin' Together"		3:35
2.	"(As Long As I Can) Get You When I Want You"	George Jackson, Raymond Moore	2:25
3.	"Get Back"	John Lennon, Paul McCartney	3:05
4.	"The Way You Love Me"		2:37
5.	"You Can Have It"		3:30
6.	"Game of Love"		2:46
7.	"Funkier Than a Mosquita's Tweeter"	Aillene Bullock	2:35
8.	"Ooh Poo Pah Doo"	Jessie Hill	3:36
9.	"Proud Mary"	John Fogerty	4:57
10.	"Goodbye, So Long"		1:57
11.	"Let It Be"	John Lennon, Paul McCartney	3:10
Total length:			34:13

== Personnel ==
- Tina Turner – lead vocals
- Ike Turner – vocals (intro of "Proud Mary"), all instrumentation
- The Ikettes – background vocals
- The Kings of Rhythm – all instrumentation
- Brent Maher – engineer
- Herb Kravitz – photography
- Ron Wolin – art direction

== Charts ==
=== Weekly charts ===
Chart (1971)	Peak position
Canada RPM 100	52
Germany (GfK)	12
US Billboard Top LP's	25
US Billboard Top R&B LP's	3
US Cash Box Top 100 Albums	36
US Record World Albums	26

=== Year-end charts ===
Chart (1971)	Position
German Albums (Offizielle Top 100)	39
