= Alline Bullock =

American songwriter (1936–2010)

- Born: Ruby Alline Bullock; December 1, 1936; Haywood County, Tennessee, U.S.
- Died: September 4, 2010 (aged 73); Valley Village, California, U.S.
- Other names: Aillene Bullock; Ruby Alline Selico
- Occupation: Songwriter
- Relatives: Tina Turner (sister); Eugene Bridges (first cousin once removed)

Ruby Alline Bullock Selico (December 1, 1936 – September 4, 2010) was an American songwriter. Best known as the older sister of singer Tina Turner, Bullock wrote songs for Ike & Tina Turner as well as their band, the Kings of Rhythm (also known as The Family Vibes). Most notably, she wrote "Funkier Than a Mosquita's Tweeter," which was covered by Nina Simone. She also briefly managed the girl group the Ikettes after they left the Ike & Tina Turner Revue.

== Biography ==
Ruby Alline Bullock was born on December 1, 1936, the second child of Zelma Priscilla (née Currie) and first to Floyd Richard Bullock. She had a half-sister, Evelyn Juanita Currie, who was two years older, and a younger sister, Anna Mae Bullock, three years her junior. Her family lived in Nutbush, Tennessee where her father worked as an overseer of the sharecroppers at Poindexter Farm on Highway 180.

During World War II, her parents moved up north for work and she stayed at her maternal grandparents' home while her younger sister stayed with their paternal grandparents. After the war, Bullock and her sisters were reunited with their parents in Knoxville, Tennessee. Shortly after, the family returned to Haywood County and she attended Flagg Grove Elementary School. In 1950, her mother left without notice, moving to St. Louis, Missouri, to escape her volatile marriage. Her father remarried soon after and moved to Detroit, Michigan. Bullock and her sisters were sent to live with their grandmother Georgeanna Currie in Brownsville, Tennessee. As a teenager, her half-sister Evelyn died in a car crash alongside her cousins Margaret and Vela Evans, but Evans survived the crash. After graduating from Carver High School in Brownsville, Bullock moved to Detroit to live with some relatives for a short while before reuniting with her mother in St. Louis.

In 1956, Bullock's grandmother Georgeanna died and her sister Anna Mae joined them in St. Louis. Bullock introduced her sister to the club scene in St. Louis and the neighboring East St. Louis, Illinois. Bullock worked as a barmaid at the Manhattan Club where the house band was Ike Turner and his Kings of Rhythm. Turner had the most popular band in the Greater St. Louis area. Bullock was dating Kings of Rhythm drummer Eugene Washington when he gave Anna Mae the microphone during an intermission in 1957. Anna Mae joined the band as Little Ann, one of Turner's vocalists.

In 1960, Turner renamed Little Ann, giving her the name Tina Turner, and formed the Ike & Tina Turner Revue. The duo released a string of hit records, including "A Fool in Love" (1960), "It's Gonna Work Out Fine" (1961), and "I Idolize You" (1961). Bullock eventually relocated to Los Angeles and lived with Ike and Tina's four sons while they toured across the country. She worked in the business side of the Ike & Tina Turner organization. She briefly managed the Ikettes (Robbie Montgomery, Venetta Fields, and Jessie Smith) after they left the revue in 1965, but Ike prevented them from using the name; they became the Mirettes. As a songwriter, Bullock wrote songs for Ike & Tina Turner, most notably "Funkier Than a Mosquita's Tweeter" on their album Workin' Together (1970). The song has been covered by various artists, including Nina Simone. She also wrote three songs on the 1972 album Strange Fruit by the Family Vibes (formerly the Kings of Rhythm).

After her sister's acrimonious divorce from Ike in 1978, Bullock still considered him her brother-in-law and attended his funeral in 2007. She told Ebony in 2008: "He was generous and jovial. He seemed like he was forgiving and wanted to be forgiven for the things he did in his early years. The media, after he died, tried to destroy his name." By then, she was using the surname Selico.

She died at the age of 73 in Valley Village, California, on September 4, 2010. In 2018, Turner recalled that she arranged a respectful farewell and noted that her sister "had a good life, everybody liked her," but devoted much of it to caring for her daughter's five children, often neglecting her own health after years of smoking and chronic coughing.

== Songwriting credits ==
- 1970: Ike Turner – "Love Is a Game"
- 1970: Ike & Tina Turner – "Funkier Than a Mosquita's Tweeter"
- 1971: Ike & Tina Turner – "Baby (What You Want Me to Do)"
- 1971: Ike & Tina Turner – "Pick Me Up (Take Me Where Your Home Is)"
- 1972: The Family Vibes – "Happy but Lonely"
- 1972: The Family Vibes – "Bootie Lip"
- 1972: The Family Vibes – "D.M.Z."
- 1974: Nina Simone – "Funkier Than a Mosquito's Tweeter"
- 2005: Nikka Costa – "Funkier Than a Mosquito's Tweeter"
- 2009: Joe Bonamassa – "Funkier Than a Mosquito's Tweeter"
- 2011: Kara Grainger – "Babe What You Want Me to Do"
- 2012: Morgan James – "Funkier Than a Mosquito's Tweeter"
- 2016: Cherrill Rae – "Funkier Than a Mosquita's Tweeter"
