= Ooh Poo Pah Doo =

1960 single by Jessie Hill

Single by Jessie Hill
- B-side: "Ooh Poo Pah Doo - Part II"
- Released: February 1960
- Genre: R&B
- Length: 2:20
- Label: Minit
- Songwriter: Jessie Hill
- Producer: Allen Toussaint

Jessie Hill singles chronology
"Ooh Poo Pah Doo" (1960)	"Whip It on Me" (1960)

"Ooh Poo Pah Doo" is a song written and performed by Jessie Hill. It was arranged and produced by Allen Toussaint. The single reached No. 3 on the Billboard R&B chart and No. 28 on the Hot 100 in 1960 although the charts list the B-side, instrumental "Ooh Poo Pah Doo - Part II", as the hit.

== Origins ==
"Ooh Poo Pah Doo" was performed by a New Orleans pianist known only as "Big Four". Reportedly Jessie Hill wrote down the melody and lyrics while hearing it live and began performing it with his own band. Hill later added an intro which he said was taken from Dave Bartholomew. Bartholomew himself used the intro in his song "Hey Hey".

== Ike & Tina Turner versions ==
"Ooh Poo Pah Doo"
- 1972 Spanish single

Single by Ike & Tina Turner

from the album Workin' Together
- B-side: "I Wanna Jump"
- Released: May 1971
- Genre: R&B
- Length: 3:36
- Label: United Artists
- Songwriter: Jessie Hill
- Producer: Ike Turner

Ike & Tina Turner singles chronology
"Proud Mary" (1971)	"Ooh Poo Pah Doo" (1971)	"I'm Yours (Use Me Anyway You Wanna)" (1971)

Ike & Tina Turner recorded a live version of the song which was released as "Ooh Poop A Doo" by Warner Bros. in 1964. It was included on their 1967 album The Ike & Tina Turner Show – Vol. 2. They recorded a studio version of "Ooh Poo Pah Doo" for their 1970 album Workin' Together. It was released as a single in May 1971 following their hit single "Proud Mary". The single reached No. 31 on the Billboard R&B chart and No. 60 on the Hot 100 chart. It peaked at No. 37 on the Cash Box Top 100 and No. 22 on Cash Box's R&B chart.

=== Reception ===
Billboard (May 8, 1971): "The dynamic duo add a new touch to the old favorite–new lyric and performance, loaded with Hot 100 and soul chart potency. Wild vocal workout."

Cash Box (May 8, 1971): "One of the regulars in LP's by blues and some top forty acts, 'Ooh Poo Pah Doo' is turned into a powerful sales single by the 'Proud Mary' duo. Riding a new peak in their career, Ike & Tina should have no problems seeing this one break R&B and T-40."

== Other versions ==
- Ronnie Dio & The Prophets released a version of the song as a single in 1962, but it did not chart.
- The Shirelles and King Curtis released a version of the song on their 1962 album Give a Twist Party. It was also featured on The Shirelles' 1963 album Foolish Little Girl.
- Etta James released a version of the song on her 1963 live album Etta James Rocks the House.
- Sandy Nelson released a version of the song as the B-side to his 1963 single "Feel So Good".
- Rufus Thomas released a version on his 1963 album Walking the Dog
- Freddie Fender released a version of the song as a single in 1964, but it did not chart.
- The Standells released a version of the song on their 1964 live album In Person at P.J.s.
- The Kingsmen released a version of the song on their 1964 album The Kingsmen Volume II and on their 1966 album 15 Great Hits.
- Ike & Tina Turner released a live version of the song (as "Ooh Poop A Doo") in 1964, which was included on their 1967 album The Ike & Tina Turner Show – Vol. 2. A studio version of the song appeared on their 1970 album Workin' Together and was released as a single in 1971. It reached No. 31 on the Billboard R&B chart and No. 60 on the Hot 100 chart.
- The Righteous Brothers on their 1965 album Just Once in My Life
- Trini Lopez released a version of the song on his 1965 album The Rhythm & Blues Album.
- Mitch Ryder & the Detroit Wheels recorded a version for their 1966 album Break Out.
- Steve Alaimo released a version of the song as the B-side to his 1967 single "New Orleans". It had originally been released on his 1962 album Mashed Potatoes.
- Johnny O'Keefe released Parts 1 & 2 as the A side of a 1967 single. It was a live favorite for him, especially on his TV shows, and was included in three EPs and several Anthologies.
- The Cake released a version of the song on their 1967 album The Cake.
- Wilson Pickett released a version of the song on his 1967 album The Wicked Pickett.
- Jimmy Smith released a version of the song on his 1974 album Black Smith.
- Dr. Hook released a version of the song on their 1981 live album Live in the U.K.
- Paul Revere & the Raiders released a version of the song on their 1965 album Here They Come!. They had performed the song on the TV series Hullaballoo.
- Tommy Ridgley released a version of the song on his 1992 album How Long?
- Taj Mahal released a version of the song on his 1996 album Phantom Blues.
- Steve Miller Band released a version of the song on their 2010 album Bingo!
- Scott Walker and The Walker Brothers released a version of the song on their 2016 album Everything Under the Sun - Osaka, Japan 1968.
- Australian blues rock band Billy Thorpe and the Aztecs recorded a 15 minute live version of the song at the 1972 Sunbury Pop Festival for their 1972 album Aztecs Live at Sunbury that took up all of side four.

== In popular culture ==
- The Shirelles' version was featured in the 1995 film Stonewall.

== Chart performance ==
Jessie Hill
Chart (1960)	Peak position
US Billboard Hot 100	28
US Billboard R&B	3

Ike & Tina Turner
Chart (1971)	Peak position
Canada (RPM)	67
US Billboard Hot 100	60
US Billboard R&B	31
US Cash Box Top 100	37
US Cash Box R&B	22
US Record World Singles	40
US Record World R&B	26
