= Workin' Together (song) =

- French picture sleeve

Single by Ike & Tina Turner

from the album Workin' Together
- B-side: "The Way You Love Me"
- Released: October 1970
- Recorded: 1970
- Genre: Pop, R&B
- Length: 3:36
- Label: Liberty
- Songwriter: Ike Turner (credited as Eki Renrut)
- Producer: Ike Turner

Ike & Tina Turner singles chronology
"I Want to Take You Higher" (1970)	"Workin' Together" (1970)	"Proud Mary" (1971)

"Workin' Together" is a song written by Ike Turner (credited to Eki Renrut, an anadrome of his name) and released by Ike & Tina Turner in 1970 as the lead single from their most successful studio album Workin' Together.

== Composition and release ==
"Workin' Together" is a mid-tempo song powered by Tina's soulful chorus and Ike on guitar. The subject of the song is unusual for the duo because it's political, detailing the problems of the world. The single was released in October 1970, reaching No. 41 on the Billboard Soul Singles chart and No. 105 on Bubbling Under The Hot 100. Ike and Tina promoted the single with a music video which contains live performances, candid footage of the duo, and clips about violence, racism and war. The video was shown on American Bandstand in January 1971.

== Critical reception ==
Billboard (October 24, 1970): "Title tune of their current LP, the dynamic duo hit hard with this driving rock item with strong lyric line. A sure-fire chart topper for their recent 'I Want to take You Higher.'"

Cash Box (October 24, 1970):

"Let's try a little love for a change," wails Tina with such sheer power and liquid grace that it turns this plea for interracial peace into a total Super-smash! Creeping concert and electric pianos herald the advent of Tina's clawing heart -felt vocals. And then Ike's strong vital arrangement sweeps the song headlong towards a series of climaxes. Little doubt that this will find heavy airplay and sales in both top forty and r&b circles. It's dead on target.

== Track listing ==
All tracks are written by Ike Turner.

No.	Title	Length
1.	"Workin' Together"	3:36
2.	"The Way You Love Me"	2:38

== Chart performance ==
Chart (1970–71)	Peak position
Canada (RPM 100 Singles)	66
US Billboard Soul Singles	41
US Bubbling Under Hot 100	5
US Cash Box Top 100	91
US Cash Box Top 60 R&B	49
US Record World Singles	80
US Record World R&B Singles	31
