= Let Me Touch Your Mind =

Studio album by Ike & Tina Turner
- Released: January 1973
- Recorded: 1972
- Studio: Bolic Sound (Inglewood, CA)
- Label: United Artists
- Producer: Ike Turner, Andre Williams

Ike & Tina Turner chronology
Feel Good (1972)	Let Me Touch Your Mind (1973)	Live! The World of Ike & Tina (1973)

Singles from Let Me Touch Your Mind
- 1. "Let Me Touch Your Mind" Released: September 1972; 2. "Early One Morning" Released: January 1973

Let Me Touch Your Mind is a studio album by Ike & Tina Turner released on United Artists Records in 1973.

== Recording and release ==
Let Me Touch Your Mind was recorded at the Turners' Bolic Sound studio in 1972. The album package was designed to resemble a paper fortune teller.

The title track, "Let Me Touch Your Mind," was written by Oliver Sain and was released as the lead single in 1972. It reached No. 30 on Record World's R&B chart. "Early One Morning," The B-side to the non-album track "With A Little Help From My Friends," reached No. 47 on the Billboard Soul Singles chart in 1973. Roger Whittaker is credited as the songwriter, but the Turners rendition is a cover of Little Richard's "Early One Morning" which was released in 1958. Another track, "Help Him," was released later in 1973 as the B-side to the hit single "Nutbush City Limits." Both songs were written by Tina Turner.

== Critical reception ==
The album received positive reviews at the time of its release. It was selected as one of Record World's Album Picks.

Professional ratings
Review scores
Source	Rating
Allmusic	2/5 stars

Billboard (February 3, 1973): "It is burningly energetic soul with Tina's uniquely sexy showmanship way out front on display, in a well-conceived program of Turner originals and covers. Duos next hit could be the slow-cooking title tune or Tina's lecture on mating 'Help Him.'"

The Shreveport Journal (March 20, 1973):

This husband-wife act has been a big attraction on the soul circuit for several years. Foremost cut is the title ballad which is done in a lengthy, sensuous rendition by Tina. Best known for her all-stops-out belting, she demonstrates that technique on "Popcorn" and "Annie Had a Baby." The rest of the repertoire is the expected polished blues the two do so well.

== Reissues ==
Let Me Touch Your Mind was reissued in 2011 by BGO Records on the compilation CD Workin' Together/Let Me Touch Your Mind. In 2018, the album was reissued on CD by Universal Music.

== Track listing ==
Side A
No.	Title	Writer(s)	Length
1.	"Let Me Touch Your Mind"	Oliver Sain	3:59
2.	"Annie Had a Baby"	Henry Glover, Lois Mann	2:43
3.	"Don't Believe Her"	Ike Turner	2:52
4.	"I Had a Notion"	Tina Turner	2:44
5.	"Popcorn"	Tina Turner	3:08

Side B
No.	Title	Writer(s)	Length
1.	"Early One Morning"	Roger Whittaker (credited), Little Richard (uncredited)	3:38
2.	"Help Him"	Tina Turner	3:42
3.	"Up On the Roof"	Gerry Goffin, Carole King	2:55
4.	"Born Free"	John Barry, Don Black	3:20
5.	"Heaven Help Us All"	Ron Miller	3:12

== Chart performance ==
Chart (1973)	Peak position
US Billboard Bubbling Under Top LP's	205
