= Checkmates, Ltd. =

American R&B group

The Checkmates, Ltd. were an American R&B group from Fort Wayne, Indiana. The group, discovered by Nancy Wilson, was named such because the group included both black and white members, and their various skin tones evoked a chessboard; their one major hit was 1969's "Black Pearl", produced by Phil Spector. The song peaked at No. 13 on the U.S. pop chart. Their remake of "Proud Mary" reached No. 30 on the UK Singles Chart in late 1969.

The group broke up in 1970, but reunited in 1974 for a few more years. They performed on the same billing as Frank Sinatra and Herb Alpert, and sang the national anthem for the Thrilla in Manila in 1975. Lead singer Sonny Charles later had a moderately successful career as a solo artist. Charles and Marvin ("Sweet Louie") Smith later reunited and toured the U.S. into the 2000s.

Smith died from a heart attack on December 15, 2007, while on a cruise ship in the Caribbean, where he and Sonny Charles were scheduled to perform. He was 68. Stevens died on December 7, 2024, at the age of 85. Trees died from a ruptured aortic aneurysm on June 23, 2026, at the age of 86.

== Members ==
- Sonny Charles – lead vocals – (born Charles Hemphill, September 4, 1940, Blytheville, Arkansas) – Charles was later a vocalist with the Steve Miller Band.
- Bobby Stevens – vocals
- Harvey Trees – guitar
- Bill Van Buskirk – bass
- Marvin "Sweet Louie" Smith – drums, vocals
- Calvin Thomas – drums
- Jimmy Milton – vocals
- Joseph Ramirez – guitar

== Discography ==
=== Albums ===
Year	Album	Peak chart positions		Record label
Year	Album	US	US R&B	Record label
1967	Live! at Caesar's Palace	—	36	Capitol Records
1969	Love Is All We Have to Give	178	—	A&M Records
1971	Life	—	—	Rustic Records
1974	F/S/O	—	—	Rustic Records
1977	We Got the Moves	—	—	Fantasy Records
1977	Sould Out	—	—	Gucci Records
"—" denotes releases that did not chart or were not released in that territory.

=== Singles ===
Year	Title	Peak chart positions				Record Label	B-side	Album
Year	Title	US	US R&B	UK	AUS	Record Label	B-side	Album
1966	"Do the Walk (The Temptation Walk)"	—	—	—	—	Capitol Records	"Glad for You"	
1966	"Kissin' Her and Crying for You"	—	—	—	—	Capitol Records	"I Can Hear the Rain"	
1967	"Please Don't Take My World Away"	—	—	—	—	Capitol Records	"Mastered the Art of Love"	
1967	"Walk in the Sunlight"	—	—	—	—	Capitol Records	"A & I"	
1969	"Love Is All I Have to Give"	65	—	—	31	A&M Records	"Never Should Have Lied"	Love Is All We Have to Give
1969	"Black Pearl"	13	8	—	31	A&M Records	"Lazy Susan"	Love Is All We Have to Give
1969	"Proud Mary"	69	—	30	—	A&M Records	"Spanish Harlem"	Love Is All We Have to Give
1970	"I Keep Forgettin'"	—	—	—	—	A&M Records	"Do You Love Your Baby"	Love Is All We Have to Give
1974	"Sexy Ways"	—	—	—	—	Rustic Records	"Run Nigger Run"	F/S/O
1974	"Got to See "U" Soon"	—	—	—	—	Rustic Records	"Might Get Betta"	F/S/O
1976	"All Alone by the Telephone"	—	96	—	—	Polydor Records	"Body Language"	
1977	"I'm Laying My Heart on the Line"	—	—	—	—	Greedy Records	"Make Love to Your Mind"	
"—" denotes releases that did not chart or were not released in that territory.
