= Sonny Charles =

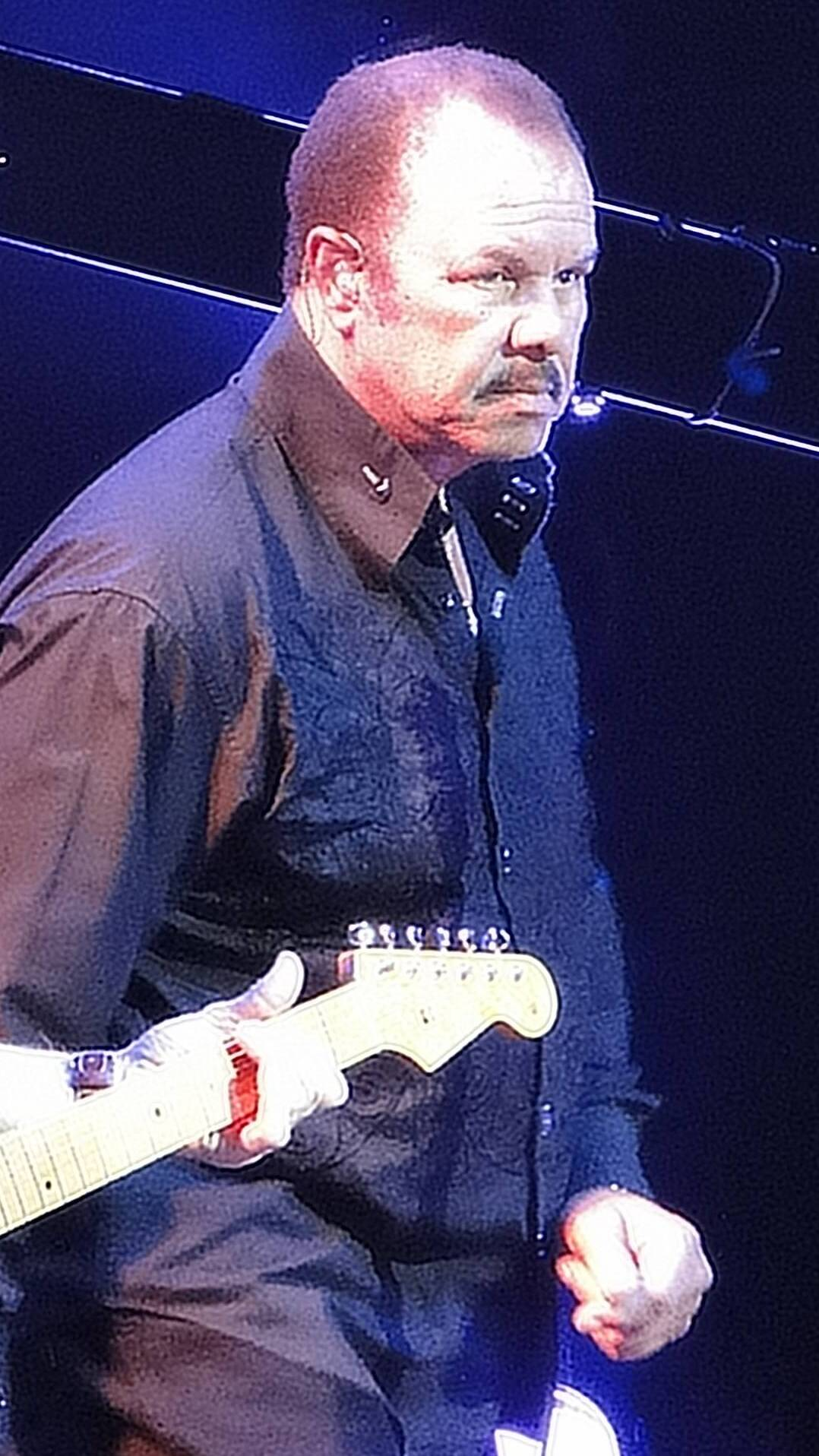
- Charles with Steve Miller at the Royal Albert Hall

Background information
- Born: Charles Hemphill; September 4, 1940 (age 85); Blytheville, Arkansas, U.S.
- Occupation: Musician
- Instrument: Vocals
- Years active: 1960–present

Sonny Charles (born Charles Hemphill; September 4, 1940) is an American soul singer.

== Biography ==
Charles Hemphill born to a sharecropping family at Blytheville, Arkansas. At the age of 10. he moved with his parents and six sisters to Fort Wayne, Indiana.

He was the lead singer of the Checkmates, Ltd. in the 1960s and 1970s, and it is his vocals that are heard out front on their 1969 Phil Spector-produced hit, "Black Pearl". Charles launched a solo career in the early 1970s, and had a brief reunion with the Checkmates during the 1980s. Thereafter, from the mid- to late 1990s, he toured with another member of the Checkmates, Ltd., Marvin "Sweet Louie" Smith, under the Checkmates name.

Charles's 1982 album, The Sun Still Shines, recorded on Highrise Records, hit No. 136 on the Billboard albums chart albums chart and No. 14 on U.S. Black LPs chart on the strength of the single "Put It in a Magazine". Written by Charles and producer Bobby Paris, the song went to No. 2 on the R&B singles chart and No. 40 on the Billboard Hot 100 in early 1983. The follow-up single, "Always on My Mind", peaked at No. 53, and Charles quickly fell from view.

Charles toured with the Steve Miller Band in 2008 to 2012.
