= Leath (surname) =

Leath is a surname. Notable people with the surname include:

- Marvin Leath (1931–2000), American politician from Texas
- Raynella Leath (1948–2026), former life prisoner in America
- Steven Leath (born 1957), American academic administrator
- Vaughn De Leath (1894–1943), American singer with stage name adapted from her surname Vonderlieth

== Other uses of the name ==
- Leath Correctional Institution, South Carolina
- Porter-Leath, non-profit organisation in Memphis, Tennessee
  - Porter-Leath House, historic house in Memphis

== See also ==
- Leath Cuinn and Leath Moga, legendary divisions of Ireland
