= Sugar Hill Records =

Sugar Hill Records may refer to:

- Sugar Hill Records (bluegrass label), founded 1978
- Sugar Hill Records (hip hop label), founded 1979

== See also ==
- SugarHill Recording Studios, a Texas recording studio
- The Sugarhill Gang, a band founded by former members of the hip hop label
- Sugar Hill (disambiguation)
