= Åsum =

Åsum is a place name and surname in Scandinavia. The Old Norse name is derived from the words for ridge (ås) and home (um). Alternative spellings include Aasum, Aasumb, and Awsumb.

Åsum may refer to:

- Åsum, Denmark, a village and eastern suburb of Odense, Funen, Denmark
- Norra Åsum, a locality in Kristianstad, Skåne, Sweden
- Södra Åsum, a church in Sjöbo Municipality, Skåne County, Sweden

== See also ==
- ASUM (disambiguation), an acronym for organizations
- Awsumb, an alternative spelling of Åsum
