= Humes Preparatory Academy Middle School =

- L.C. Humes High School
- U.S. National Register of Historic Places
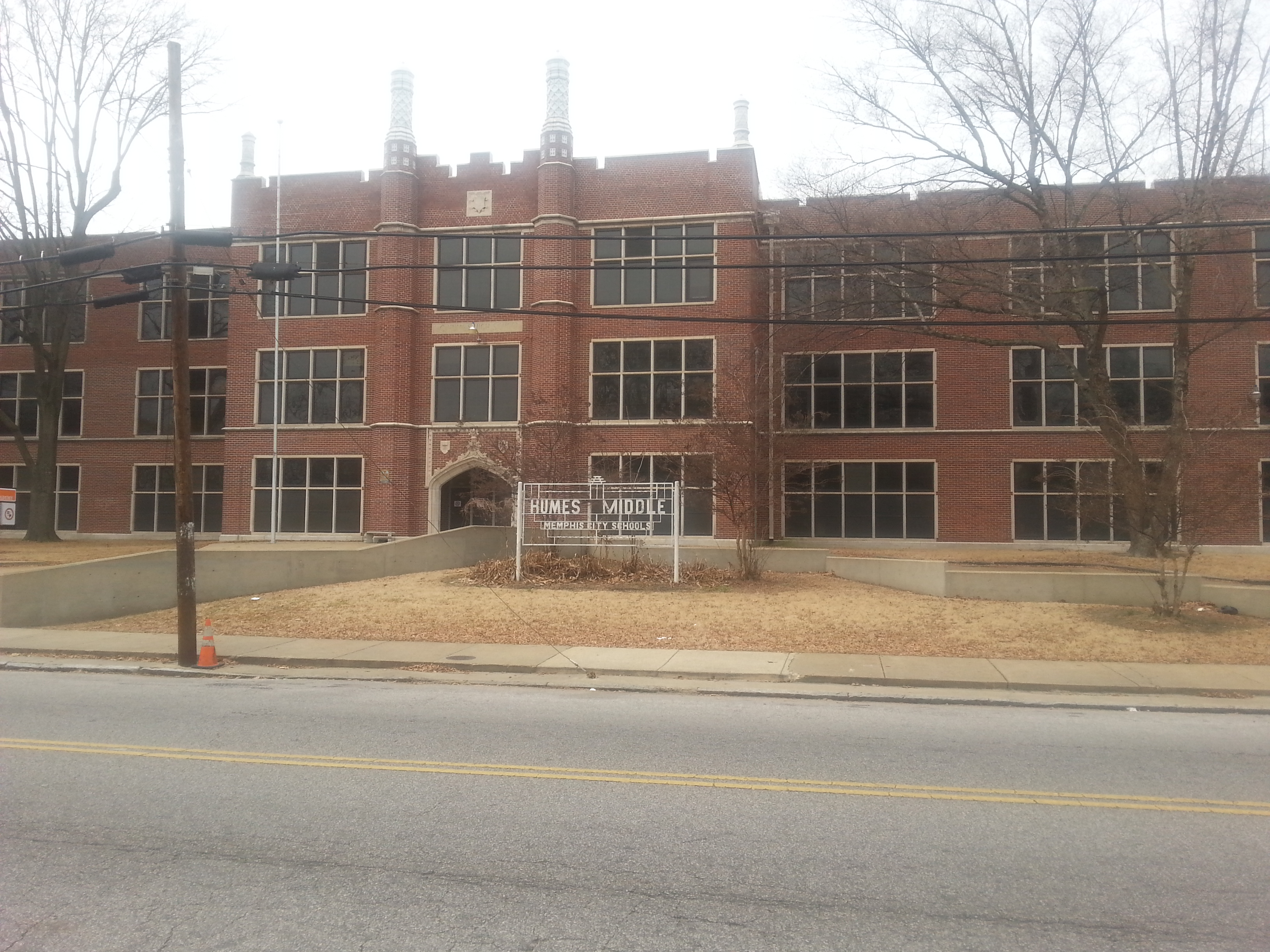
- Humes School main entrance

- Location within Tennessee Location within the United States
- Location: 659 N. Manassas St., Memphis, Tennessee
- Coordinates: 35.1589°N 90.0334°W
- Area: 7.2 acres (2.9 ha)
- Built: 1924
- Architect: George Awsumb
- Architectural style: Collegiate Gothic
- MPS: Public Schools of Memphis 1902-1915 MPS
- NRHP reference No.: 98000368
- Added to NRHP: July 12, 2004

Humes Preparatory Academy Middle School, formerly the L. C. Humes High School, is a middle school located in Memphis, Tennessee. It has also been known as North Side High School and as L.C. Humes Junior High School. It was open as a high school from the 1930s through 1967 and later became a middle school in the Memphis City Schools district. In 2004, the school was listed on the National Register of Historic Places for "its significance in education to Memphis, Tennessee and its Collegiate Gothic design", the latter the work of noted architect George Awsumb.

The school also has a connection to Elvis Presley, who graduated from the school in 1953. The school has numerous alumni from nearby Porter-Leath from its days as an orphanage and current foster care facility.

In 2012, the school opened as a charter school run by Gestalt Community Schools. In 2017 it was announced that control of the school would be transferred to Frayser Community schools when Gestalt would exit after experiencing declining enrollment and funding.

== Notable alumni ==
- Bill Black
- John Bramlett
- Jack Cristil
- George Klein
- Elvis Presley
- Red West
