= Vollintine Hills Historic District =

Historic district in Tennessee, United States

Coordinates: 35.1647°N 89.9989°W

- U.S. National Register of Historic Places
- U.S. Historic district
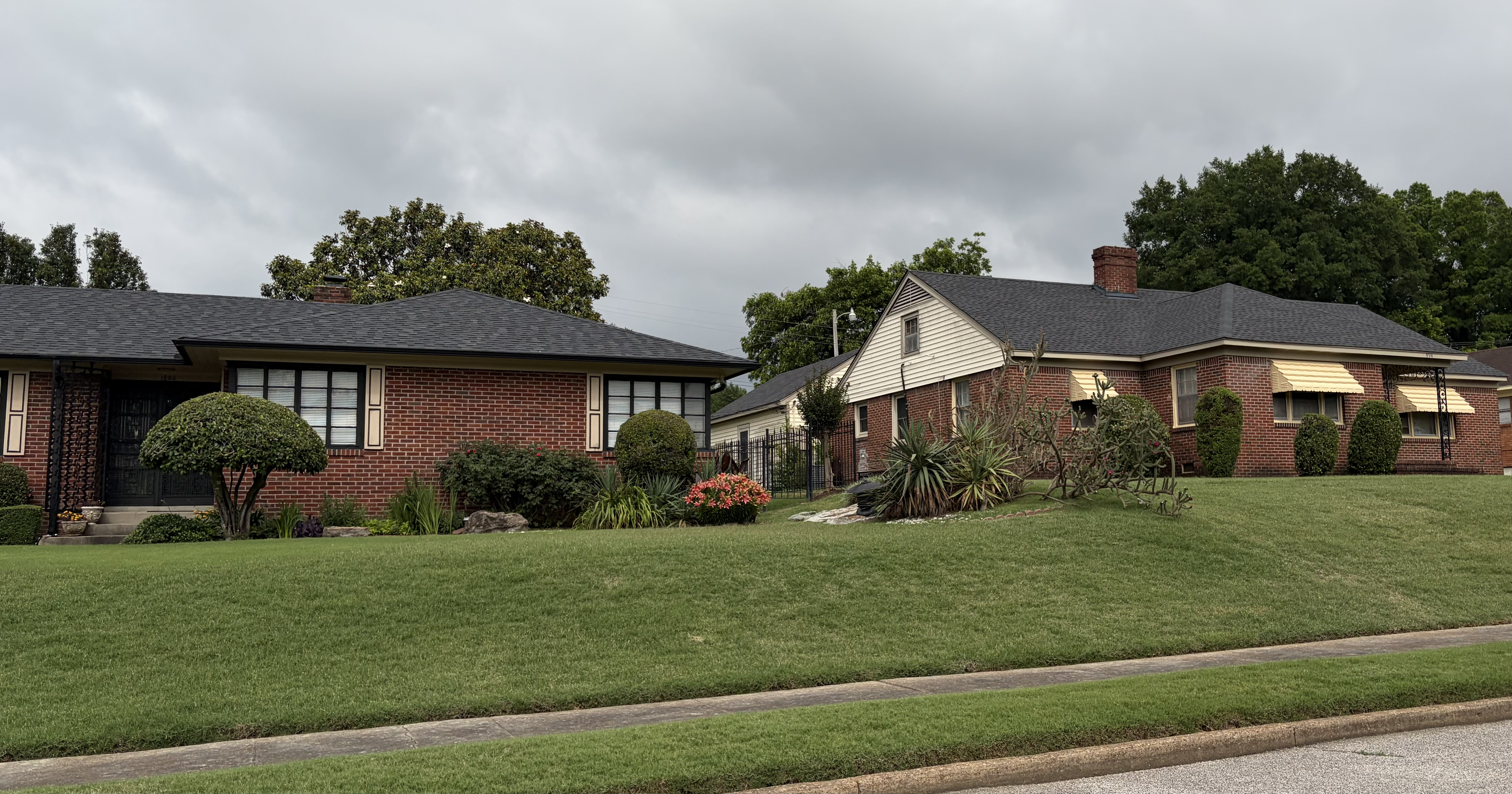
- Houses in the historic district

- Location within Tennessee Location within the United States
- Location: Roughly bounded by Vollintine, Brown, McLean, and Evergreen, Memphis, Tennessee
- Architect: George Awsumb; Gruber, Herman
- Architectural style: Colonial Revival, International, Minimal Traditional, Modernist Ranch
- MPS: Memphis MPS
- NRHP reference No.: 07000684
- Added to NRHP: July 11, 2007

Vollintine Hills Historic District is a historic district located in the Midtown area of Memphis, Tennessee, notable for its cohesive collection of 78 post-World War II Minimal Traditional and ranch-style houses built around a former synagogue. "The neighborhood represents the efforts of members of an Orthodox religious group to accommodate their beliefs by developing a synagogue and housing for the congregation within easy walking distance."

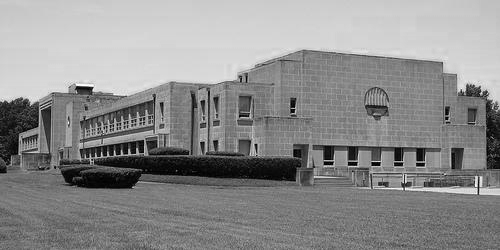
Baron Hirsch Synagogue in the 1950s

Added to the National Register of Historic Places in 2007, the area also includes the former site of the Baron Hirsch Synagogue, built in two phases—1950-52 and 1955-57—in the International Style and set on a 12.4-acre (50,000 m^{2}) site at the southwest corner of the district.

When it was completed in 1957, the main sanctuary of the synagogue was the largest in the United States, according to the Union of Orthodox Jewish Congregations of America.

Houses within the district are largely "intact and homogeneous building stock constructed between 1946–1957" in conjunction with the synagogue, and are within walking distance of the former synagogue. They originally served to house its orthodox Jewish congregation." The district has been singled out for its unity by both "its historic building stock and contiguity to the former synagogue."

Vollintine Hills is notable as a clearly definable geographic area, whose physical development, "defined by the needs of a religious community," is "readily distinguishable from surrounding properties."

Although the synagogue was vacated in 1984 and moved to a new location farther east in Memphis, the original building still stands and in 1992 was sold by the congregation to the Gethsemane Garden Church of God in Christ. The historic area "continues to be a viable area today, adapting to changing times and needs."

Vollintine Hills is located approximately four miles east of the downtown Memphis central building district in the northern section of the Midtown area, and is roughly bounded by Vollintine Avenue, Brown Avenue, McLean Boulevard, and Evergreen Street.

== Recent events ==
In 2008, a controversial proposal to build a multistory 117-unit apartment development on 2.81 acres (11,400 m^{2}) of land behind the former synagogue site was rejected by the Memphis City Council. Fearing that the project would "affect the integrity of the Vollintine Hills" historic district and "destabilize the neighborhood," residents of the Vollintine Hills neighborhood had vigorously opposed the development, which was part of a proposal by the Gethsemane Garden Church of God in Christ, which purchased the former synagogue in 1992. The Memphis City Council sided with Vollintine Hills residents, ultimately upholding a 1947 covenant covering the kind of housing allowed in the neighborhood, restricting it specifically to single-family houses on individual lots. Parts of the covenant read, "All lots in the subdivision shall be described as residential" and "No construction other than single-family dwellings shall be built and none over two stories."

Residents of the area had united for several months, voicing their concerns that the development would affect the integrity of the historic district by introducing a high occupancy structure into the district of single-family homes which mark its character and for which it was cited for inclusion in the NRHP. Increased traffic, parking, and environmental impact were also issues of concern.

Residents intensified their efforts after an initial approval of the project by the Memphis Land Use Control Board despite their opposition.

Project developers had altered their plans repeatedly in response to the concerns by neighbors about the size and design of the proposed development, scaling back the original proposal.

Local news coverage took note of the Vollintine Hills community's highly organized opposition and efforts to preserve the character of their historic neighborhood, characterizing the district as "a middle-income area of 50- to 80-year-old homes on the National Register of Historic Places that is vigorously maintained by some of the most diligent neighborhood activists in town."
