= Rafael Grossman =

American rabbi

Rabbi Rafael G. Grossman (23 November 1933 – 12 April 2018) was a noted American rabbi. For nearly three decades, he was the rabbi of Baron Hirsch Synagogue, an Orthodox congregation in Memphis, Tennessee, and one of the largest Orthodox congregations in the United States. Grossman was also the chairman of the Religious Zionists of America.

Rafael G. Grossman grew up in Lakewood, New Jersey, and was a student of Rabbi Yisroel Zev Gustman.

Prior to Memphis "he held pulpits in San Antonio, New York City and New Jersey." In two of the four cities he founded a Jewish day school.

He also helped found a Kollel in Fort Lee, NJ

== Jewish organizational involvement ==
Over the course of his career, Grossman held leadership roles at some of the nation's most respected Jewish organizations. He was a past president of the Beth Din of America and the Rabbinical Council of America, Chairman of the Rabbinical Council International, Chairman of the National Rabbinic Cabinet of Israel Bonds, a member of the executive Board of the Union of Orthodox Congregations of America and a member of the Board of the Development Corporation of Israel. A recipient of the OU's National Rabbinic leadership Award, Rabbi Grossman was one of ten rabbis to be honored at the centennial celebration of the Union of Orthodox Congregations of America. He was also awarded the degree of Doctor of Divinity honoris causa from Yeshiva University in New York.

== Works ==
Grossman is the author of Binah: The Modern Quest for Torah Understanding, on the Book of Genesis. His scholarly papers appeared in numerous journals and volumes.

His weekly column Thinking Aloud which was printed in The Jewish Press and other periodicals also appeared online.

== Family ==
Grossman's father, upon coming from Poland in the 1940s, for a while was the rabbi of a synagogue in Boro Park; later the family moved to New Jersey.

Rabbi Grossman, who grew up in Lakewood, was survived by his wife, their four children, and twenty one grandchildren.

He authored a book "My Shoshana" about the 17-year-old daughter who predeceased him by about 45 years. In a review, Rabbi Hillel Goldberg wrote that (in particular subsequently) "he ... helped many parents" and quoted from the book, which is subtitled "A father’s journey through loss" that "No two people can feel the same way. Each of us feels pain, anger, even guilt differently."

On the advice of a rabbinical colleague, the Grossman family moved to Memphis, Tennessee.
