= Idlewild Presbyterian Church =

Historic church in Tennessee, United States

- U.S. National Register of Historic Places
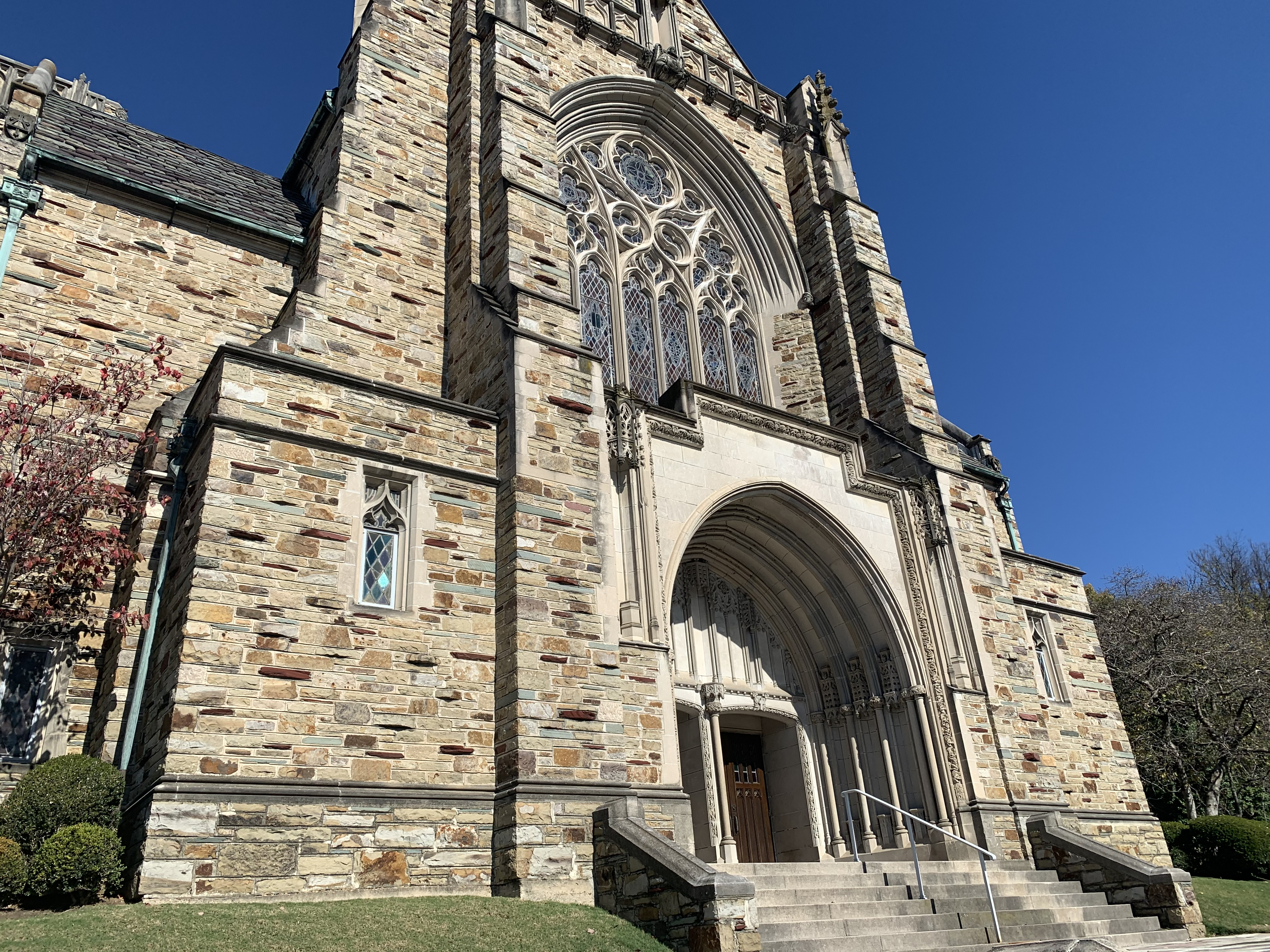
- Location: 1750 Union Avenue, Memphis, Tennessee
- Coordinates: 35.1360°N 90.0034°W
- Area: 2.2 acres (0.89 ha)
- Built: 1926
- Architectural style: Late Gothic Revival
- MPS: Memphis MPSMemphis MPSMemphis MPS
- NRHP reference No.: 09000539
- Added to NRHP: July 7, 2009

Idlewild Presbyterian Church is a historic church located at 1750 Union Avenue in Midtown Memphis, Tennessee. Idlewild is a part of the Presbyterian Church (USA).

== History ==
Founded in 1891, Idlewild grew into a prominent Memphis church over the next several decades, moving into its current building in 1928.

During the Civil Rights Movement, Idlewild was one of the few churches in Memphis that held racially integrated worship services. Following the assassination of Martin Luther King Jr., Idlewild helped found the Metropolitan Inter-Faith Association (MIFA), a community service organization that serves 50,000 people in West Tennessee annually.

Idlewild ordained its first women deacons in 1968, and had a female associate minister as early as 1974. Today, three of the four ministers at Idlewild are women.

The church was added to the National Register of Historic Places in 2009.

Recently Idlewild has continued its tradition of serving the community through partnerships with local schools and the More Than a Meal project, and through partnerships with local organizations that seek to promote social justice throughout the Memphis community. Idlewild is welcoming and affirming of the LGBT community, and blesses same-sex unions in its sanctuary.

Steve Montgomery served as Idlewild's pastor from 2000 until 2019. After an interim period under the leadership of pastor Anne Apple, Idlewild called David Powers to serve as pastor in late 2020 During the COVID-19 pandemic, Idlewild has served as a mobile food bank distribution site for families in need in the Memphis area.

== Sanctuary Building ==
Idlewild's current building was designed by George Awsumb, and it is in the Gothic Revival style. The building is similar to the nearby Rhodes College, a private liberal arts college nominally affiliated with the PC(USA). Idlewild's bell tower was completed in 1999; together the bells weigh nearly 27,000 pounds.

Recently, nearby developments have incorporated design features to engage with Idlewild's architecture as a prominent feature in the neighborhood.

== See also ==
- Presbyterian Church (USA)
- List of Presbyterian churches in the United States
- List of Presbyterian Church (U.S.A.) synods and presbyteries
- Memphis, Tennessee
