= Baron Hirsch Synagogue =

Modern Orthodox Jewish congregation and synagogue in Memphis, Tennessee

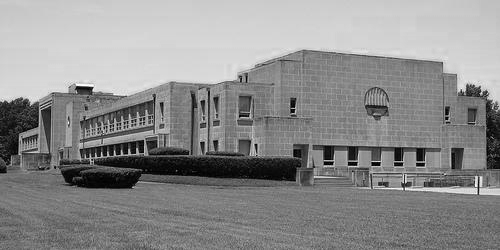

- Location in Tennessee Baron Hirsch Synagogue (the United States)

Religion
- Affiliation: Modern Orthodox Judaism
- Ecclesiastical or organisational status: Synagogue
- Leadership: Rabbi Ian Lichter
- Status: Active

Location
- Location: 400 South Yates Road, Memphis, Tennessee
- Country: United States
- Coordinates: 35°07′14″N 89°52′27″W

Architecture
- Established: c. 1862 – c. 1864 (as a congregation)
- Completed: 1892 (4th St and Washington Ave); 1915 (Pinch District); c. 1950s (heritage building below); 1988 (South Yates Road)

Website
- baronhirsch.org
- Baron Hirsch Synagogue
- U.S. Historic district – Contributing property
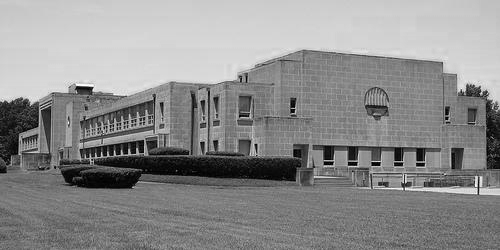
- Baron Hirsch Synagogue, in the 1950s
- Location: 1740 Vollintine Ave., Memphis, Tennessee
- Built: 1950–52 and 1955–57
- Architect: George Awsumb
- Part of: Vollintine Hills Historic District (ID07000684)
- MPS: Memphis MPS
- Designated CP: July 11, 2007

The Baron Hirsch Synagogue (also Baron Hirsch Congregation), is a Modern Orthodox Jewish congregation and synagogue located at 400 South Yates Road, Memphis, Tennessee, in the United States. Founded in c. 1862 – c. 1864, the congregation underwent tremendous growth in the first half of the 20th century, emerging, in the 1950s, as the largest Orthodox congregation in North America.

Its former building, located at 1740 Vollintine Avenue, is an impressive International Style structure built in the 1950s. The building is a U.S. Historic District Contributing Property and the centerpiece of the Vollintine Hills Historic District, a cohesive collection of 78 post-World War II Minimal Traditional and ranch-style houses built around the former synagogue by members of the congregation.

== History ==
=== 1860s–1910 ===
The nucleus of the Jewish community in Memphis formed in the downtown area north of Adams Street commonly known as the "Pinch" or "Pinch District". The Pinch was the center of, and traditionally associated with, immigration and immigrant communities in Memphis.

Having no permanent place of worship at its initial organization in the 1860s, around 1884, a group of Jewish immigrants who wished to follow religious Orthodoxy began to pray together in rooms above various downtown Memphis stores, at private homes, and on the second floor of a modest hotel. Rabbi I. Myerowitz was the congregation's first spiritual leader, serving from 1891 to 1893.

In about 1890 or 1892, the group was chartered as the Baron Hirsch Benevolent Society, named in honor of the famed French Jewish philanthropist, Baron Moritz de Hirsch.

That same year they purchased a former African American church at 4th Street and Washington Avenue, in the Pinch, for use as a synagogue, moving in 1912. A contemporary account gives membership in 1904 as eighty-five.

=== 1910–1920s ===
The Baron Hirsch congregation continued to grow and soon tore down their old building and built a new synagogue, at a cost of $35,000 ($1,114,000 in current dollar terms), on the same site in 1915. The new synagogue's sanctuary could hold over 700 worshippers. Still located in the downtown Pinch district, the congregation built the Menorah Institute next to the synagogue in 1928, providing classrooms and space for the congregation's social activities. This building was razed after the congregation relocated in the 1950s.

The total Jewish population in Memphis in 1920 was approximately 7,000 persons.

=== 1930s–1940s ===
In the 1930s, the Memphis Jewish community continued the move eastward from the Pinch and other downtown neighborhoods that had begun in the 1920s to the new subdivisions in northern Midtown around the Vollintine-Evergreen area and many members began keeping Sabbath apartments downtown in order to attend synagogue. The congregation struggled somewhat in the Depression years. However, by 1941, Baron Hirsch had 500 member households and 300 children in its religious school.

During World War II, it opened the Menorah Institute to soldiers stationed in the area, converting part of the building to a USO Center with sleeping quarters. The outside area between the synagogue and the Menorah Institute was paved for use in USO dances.

=== 1950s ===
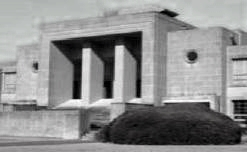
South portico and entrance facing Vollintine Avenue

Isadore Goodman was the rabbi in the years after World War II. By the late 1950s it had grown to over 1000 households and had 500 children in its school. This increase in membership coupled with the movement of Jews out of the downtown Pinch area led the congregation to begin planning for a new synagogue.

Built in two phases — 1950–52 and 1955–57 — on a 12.4-acre (50,000 m^{2}) plot, the enormous new synagogue rose on the site of a former golf course at Vollintine Avenue and Evergreen Street in midtown Memphis (in what is now the Vollintine Hills Historic District). It was built with 2200 permanent seats in the sanctuary and accommodation for an additional 1000 worshippers. When it was completed in 1957, the main sanctuary of the synagogue was the largest in the United States, according to the Union of Orthodox Jewish Congregations of America.

The $1,600,000 rectilinear International Style building was designed by architect George Awsumb with powerful gray limestone wall cladding enhancing its clean modern lines. Artisan Jack Grue designed the stained glass windows.

Construction of this new synagogue, along with a significant amount of new housing for members of the congregation that was within walking distance of the synagogue, created a clearly definable geographic area, readily distinguishable from other areas, which has now been placed on the National Register of Historic Places and called the Vollintine Hills Historic District.

The congregation's membership doubled in the new synagogue, emerging as the largest Orthodox congregation in the United States. Explanations for this strong growth vary: A claim has been made that it is a "testament to the strength of orthodox Judaism in Memphis;" other sources attribute it as something of a hallmark or local trait, that is, the tendency at that time for both Jews and Christians in Memphis to be affiliated with a religious institution. In the United States in the 1950s, there was a national trend towards increased affiliation with both church and synagogue membership rising in an unprecedented fashion. The country experienced a 40% rise in population from the 1930s to the 1950s but a 50% increase in church and synagogue affiliation.

== Recent changes ==
Continual neighborhood transitions and the ongoing movement of members toward the east-lying Memphis suburbs, meant that the congregation again needed to find an additional location to remain within walking distance of most of its members. Under Rabbi Rafael G. Grossman the congregation began a transition from its building in midtown Memphis.

Baron Hirsch acquired the estate of musician Isaac Hayes and converted the mansion for its use as a satellite campus. By the mid-1980s, almost all Baron Hirsch members were in this area and it was determined that the entire synagogue complex would have to move as well. Additional land was purchased next to the satellite site, another building campaign was undertaken, and the large new synagogue and campus on South Yates Road was completed in 1988.

== Current status ==
Although it has declined somewhat from its post-World War II peak, Baron Hirsch continues to flourish as a Modern Orthodox Zionist congregation.

The congregation is currently led by Senior Rabbi Ian Lichter, and the weekly services are led by Cantor Ricky Kampf.

The Baron Hirsch Synagogue continues to add to the community around it. In recent years it added a large outdoor space, the Mendelson Park and Playground. The synagogue also undertook a large building campaign to improve its facilities which was completed in 2022, and constructed the new Memphis Mikvah at Baron Hirsch, also completed in 2022.
