= Charles C. and Katharyn Sniteman House =

Historic house in Wisconsin, United States

- U.S. National Register of Historic Places
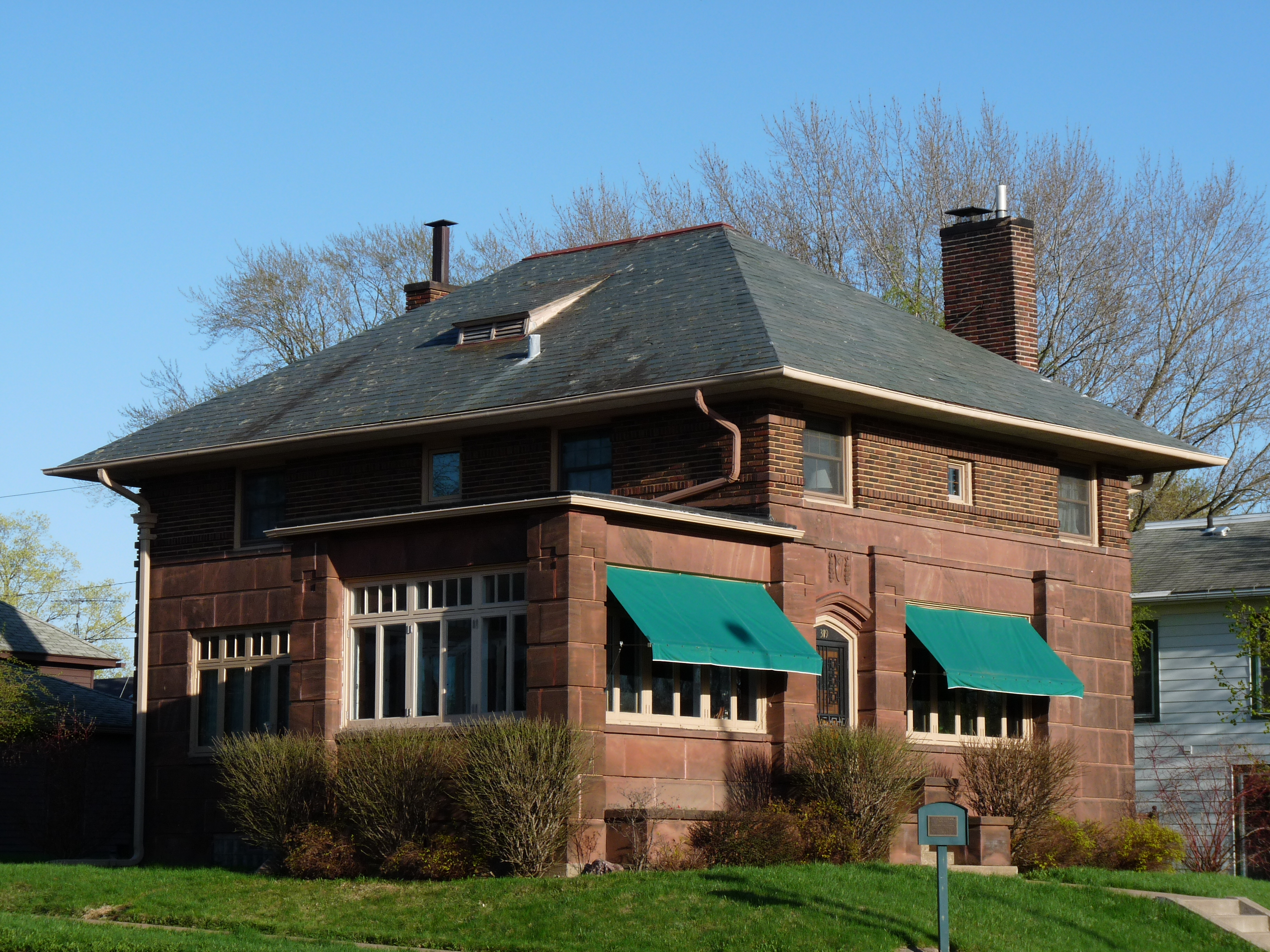
- Charles C. and Katharyn Sniteman House
- Location: 319 Hewett St. Neillsville, Wisconsin
- Coordinates: 44.55877°N 90.59603°W
- Built: 1915
- Architect: George Awsumb
- Architectural style: Prairie School
- NRHP reference No.: 11000716
- Added to NRHP: September 29, 2011

The Charles C. and Katharyn Sniteman House is located in Neillsville, Wisconsin.

== History ==
Charles C. Sniteman was a long-time pharmacist and philanthropist. The house was added to the State Register of Historic Places in 2010 and to the National Register of Historic Places the following year.
