= Dorchester Academy =

Historic school in the United States

- Dorchester Academy Boys' Dormitory
- U.S. National Register of Historic Places
- U.S. National Historic Landmark
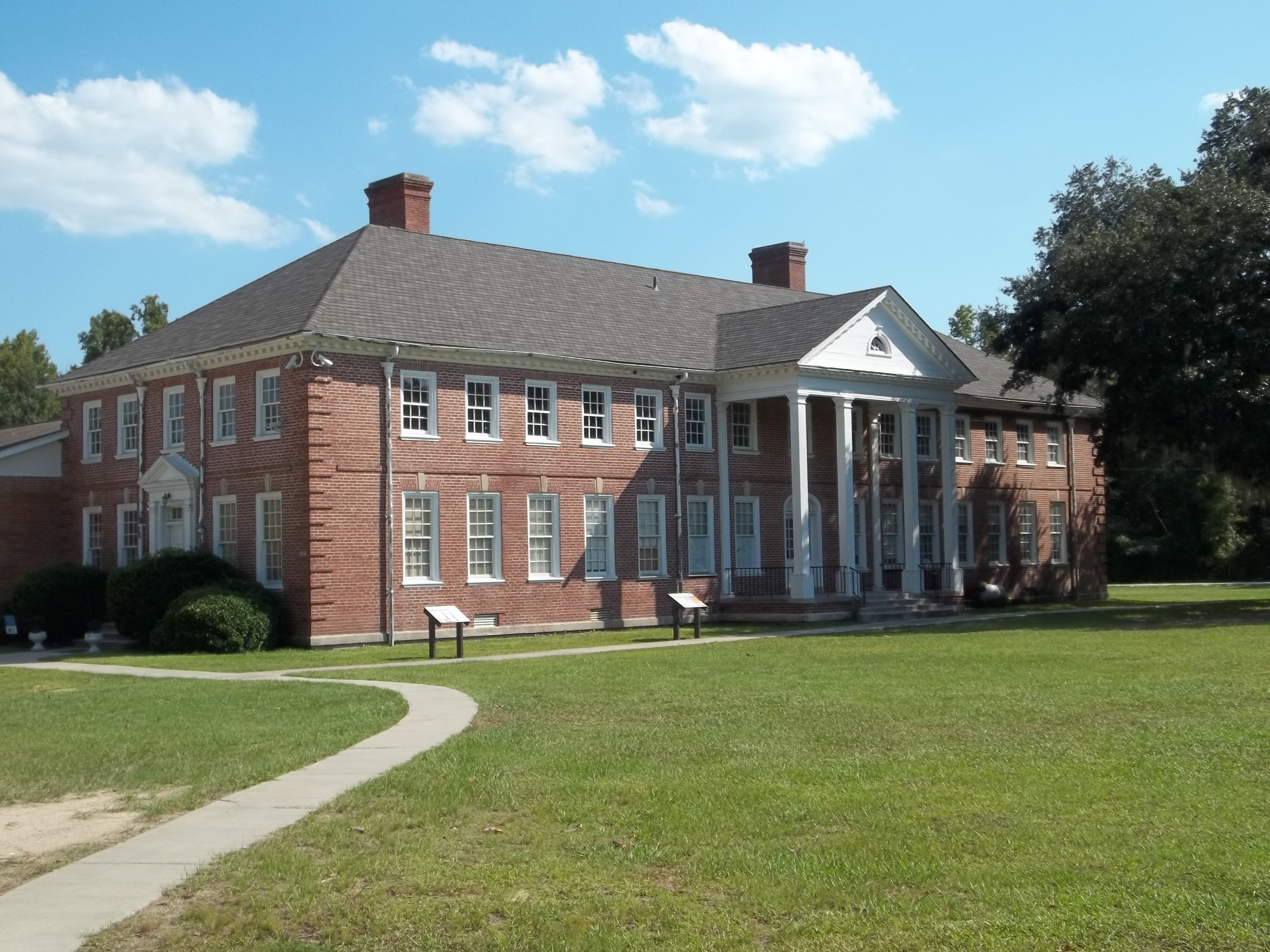

- Location within Georgia Location within the United States
- Location: 8787 East Oglethorpe Hwy, Midway, Georgia
- Coordinates: 31°48′2″N 81°27′56″W
- Built: 1935
- Architect: George Awsumb
- Architectural style: Colonial Revival
- NRHP reference No.: 86001371

Significant dates
- Added to NRHP: June 23, 1986
- Designated NHL: September 20, 2006

Dorchester Academy was a school for African-Americans located just outside Midway, Georgia. Operating from 1869 to 1940, its campus, of which only the 1935 Dorchester Academy Boys' Dormitory survives, was the primary site of the Southern Christian Leadership Conference's Citizen Education Program. This program, ran here from 1961 to 1970, worked toward attaining equality for blacks in the American South by teaching them their rights and helping them acquire the knowledge necessary to become registered voters by passing the required test. The dormitory building was designated a U.S. National Historic Landmark in 2006 for its later role in the American civil rights movement, and for its association with activist Septima Poinsette Clark, who oversaw the education program. The campus, which includes several later buildings, is now a museum and research center.

== Description and history ==
The former Dorchester Academy campus is located at the corner of Lewis Fraser Road and East Oglethorpe Highway (United States Route 84), a short way west of Midway's city hall. The campus wraps around the Midway Congregational Church, which stands directly at the street corner. Facing East Oglethorpe is a small concrete block cottage that now houses the main museum for interpreting the site. Behind this, facing Lewis Fraser, is the two-story Georgian Revival boys' dormitory, the only building to survive the academy's closure in 1940. Ancillary buildings and structures include a barbecue pit, former swimming pool site and pool house, and a single-story annex to the dormitory.

The Dorchester Academy was founded in 1869 by the American Missionary Association, a forerunner of the present United Church of Christ. The school was established to educate local freed African-Americans after the American Civil War. Many of the academy's buildings were destroyed by fire in the 1930s, and the complex was rebuilt. The school closed in 1940, at which time most of its then-extant buildings were torn down, leaving only the 1935 boys' dormitory. That building was adapted for use in 1961 by the Southern Christian Leadership Conference as the headquarters for its Citizenship Education Program, a vehicle for training African-Americans in the effective exercise of their civil rights. This program was overseen by activist Septima Poinsette Clark, who was called the "mother of the [Civil Rights] movement" by Martin Luther King Jr., and established hundreds of education centers across the American South.

Notable alumni of Dorchester Academy include architect Sanford Augustus Brookins.

Dorchester Academy was listed on the National Trust for Historic Preservation's 2009 list of America's Most Endangered Places.

== Photos ==
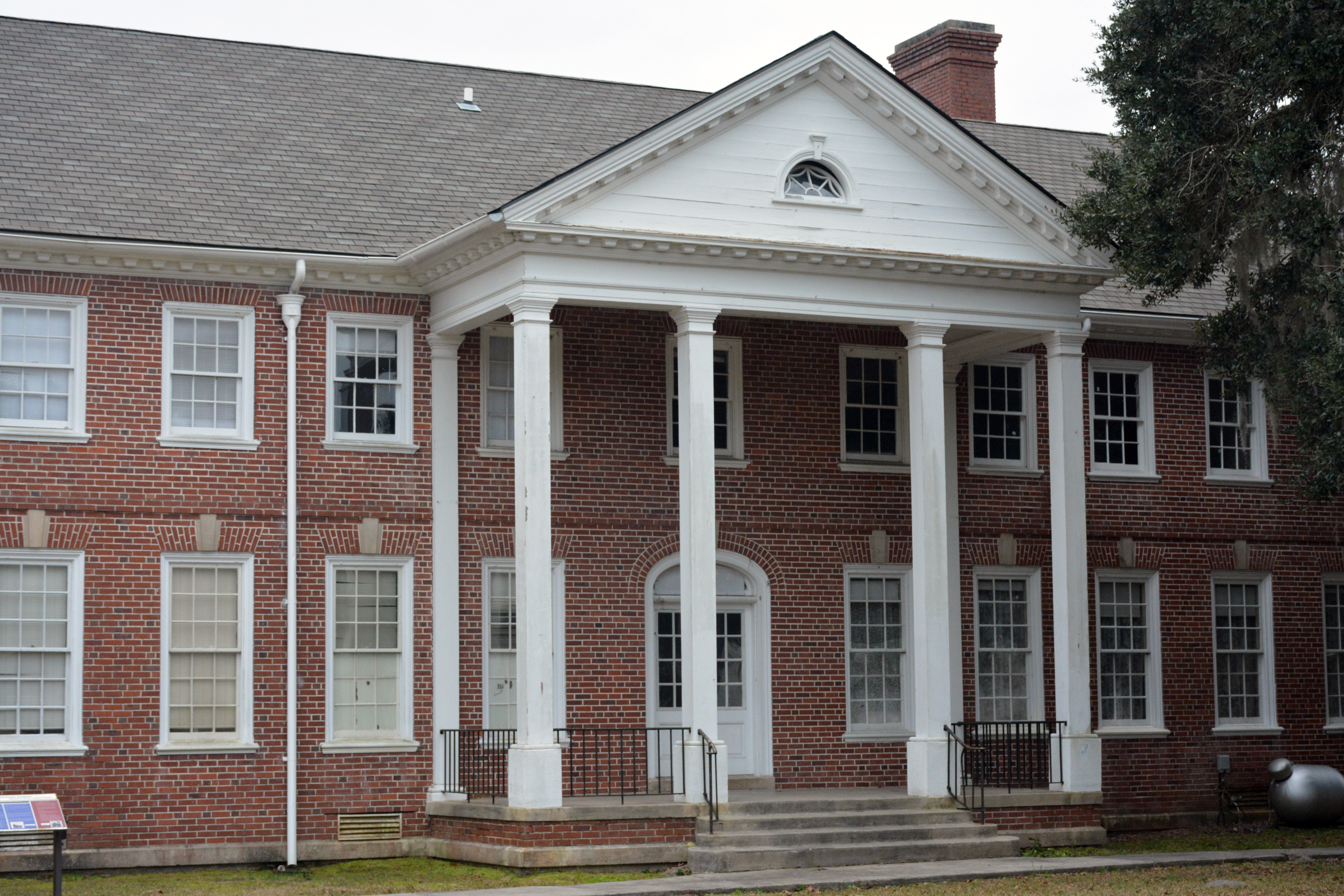
Front entrance

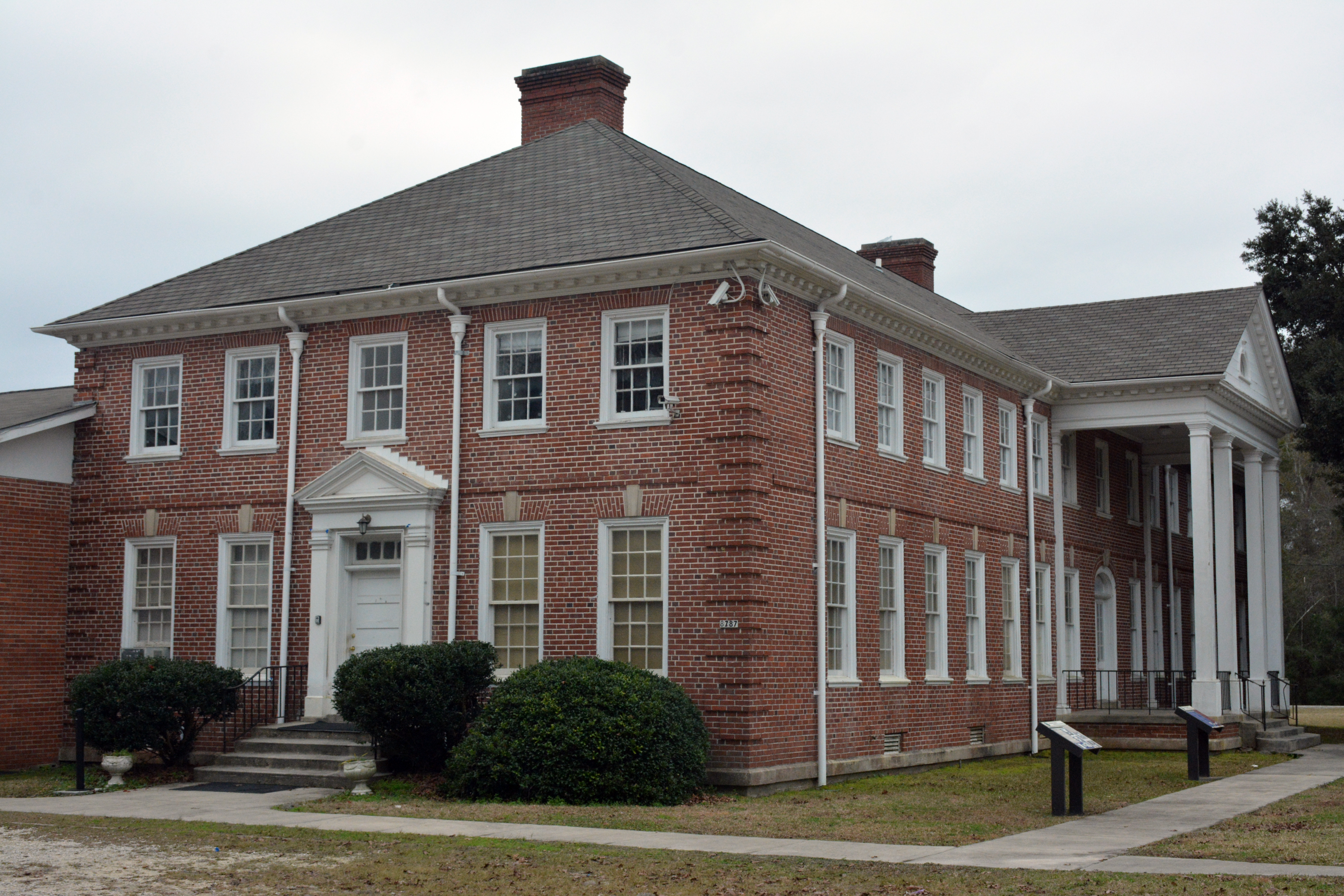
Side entrance

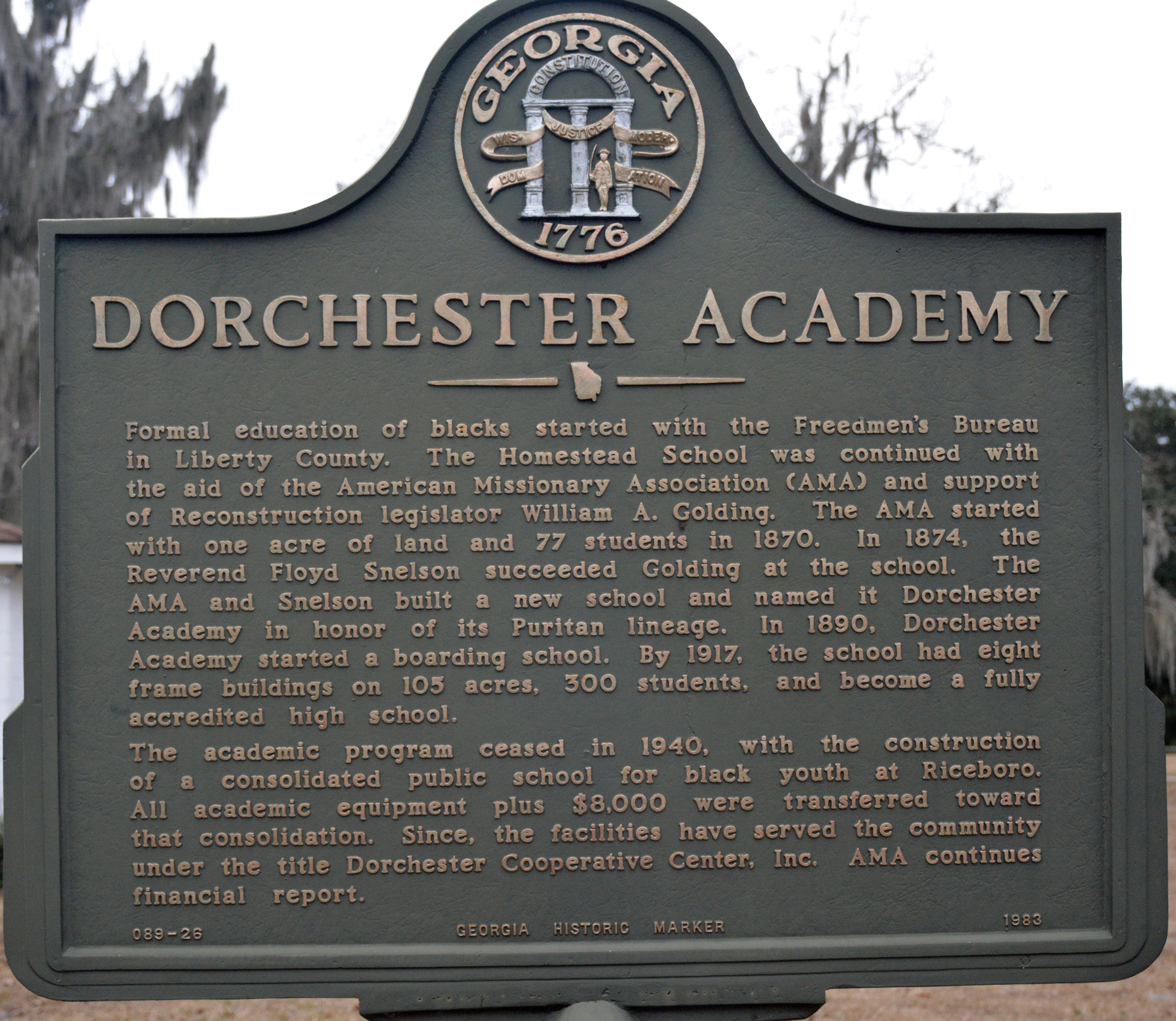
Academy historical marker

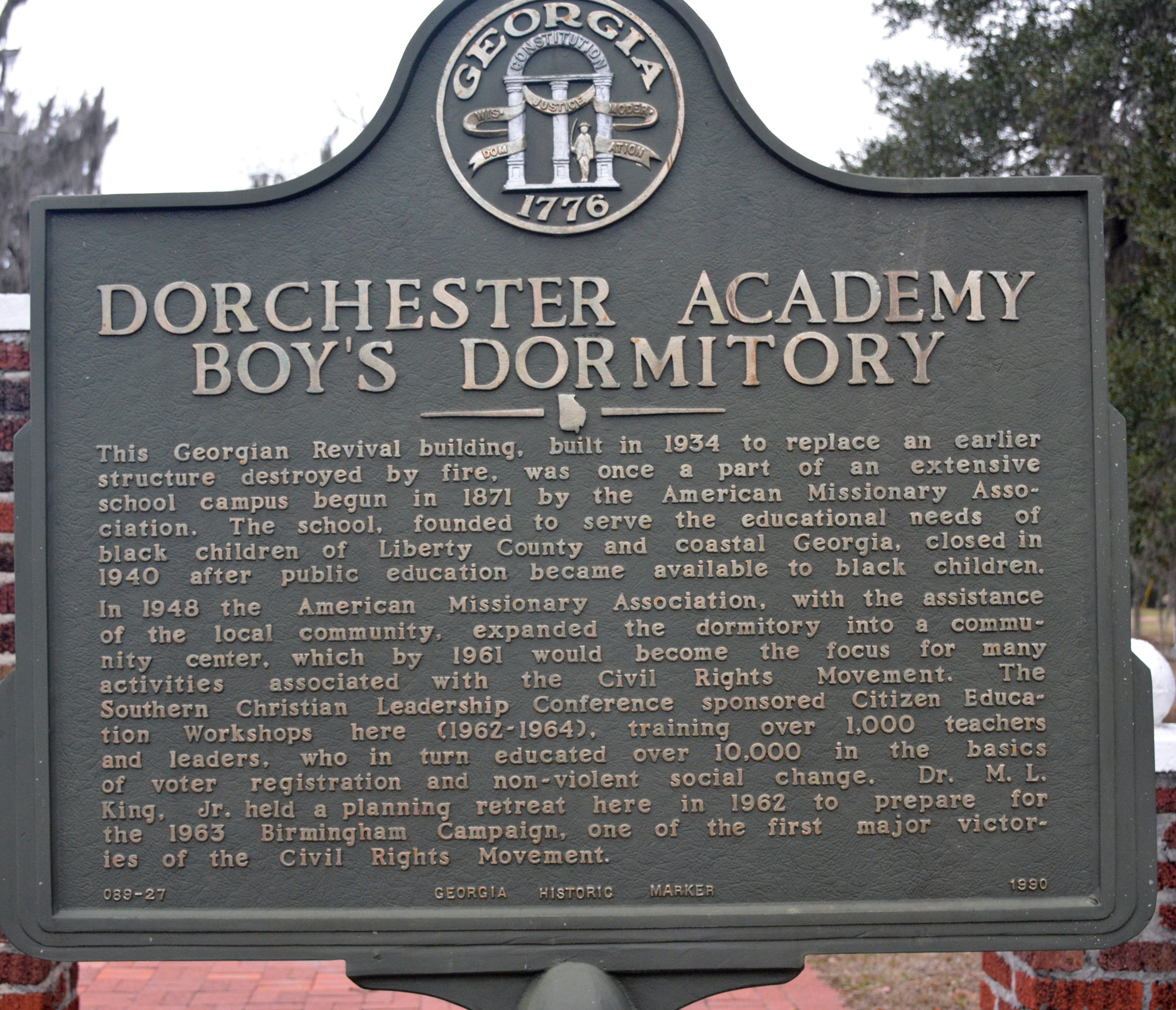
Boy's Dorm historical marker

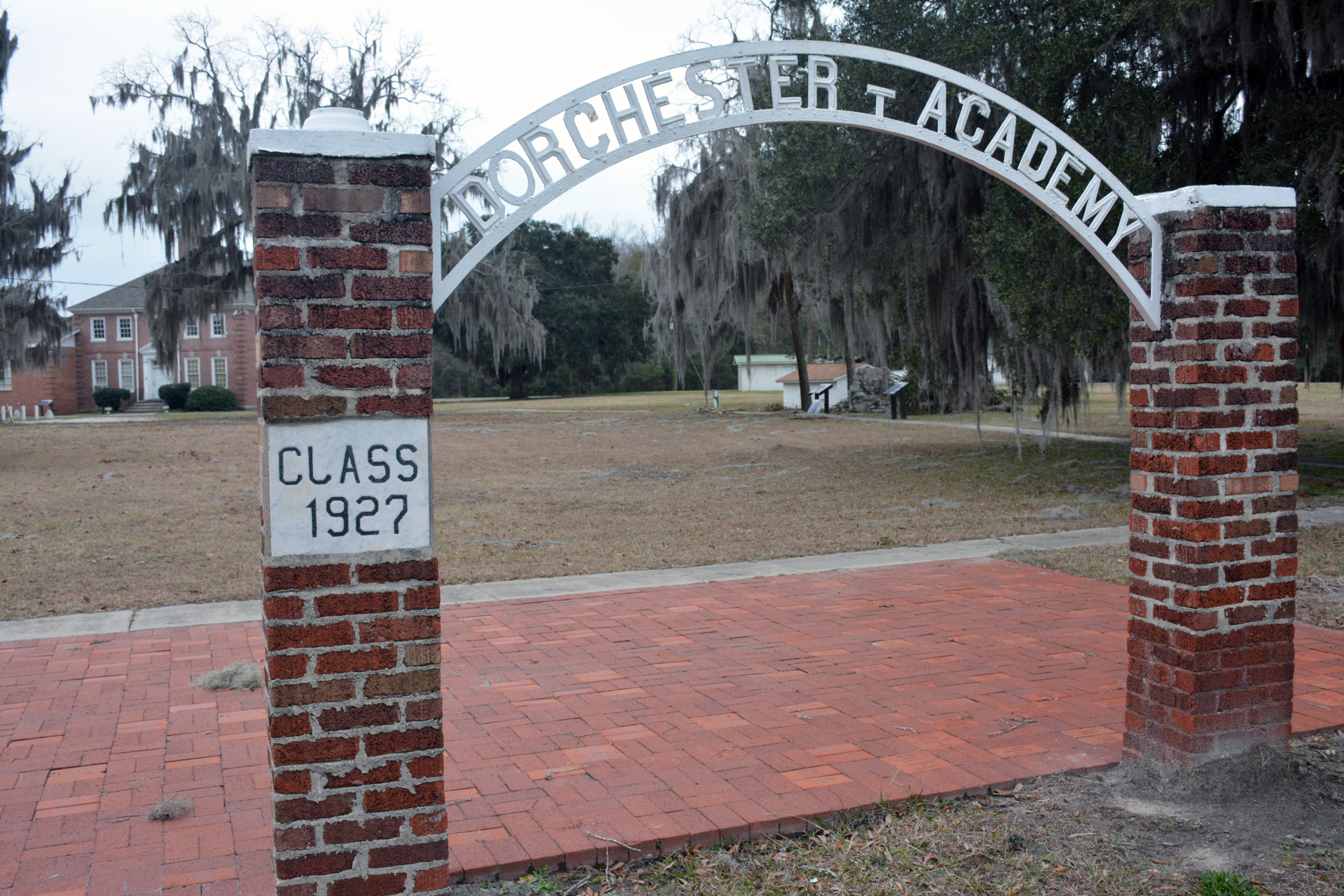
Arch, by class of 1927

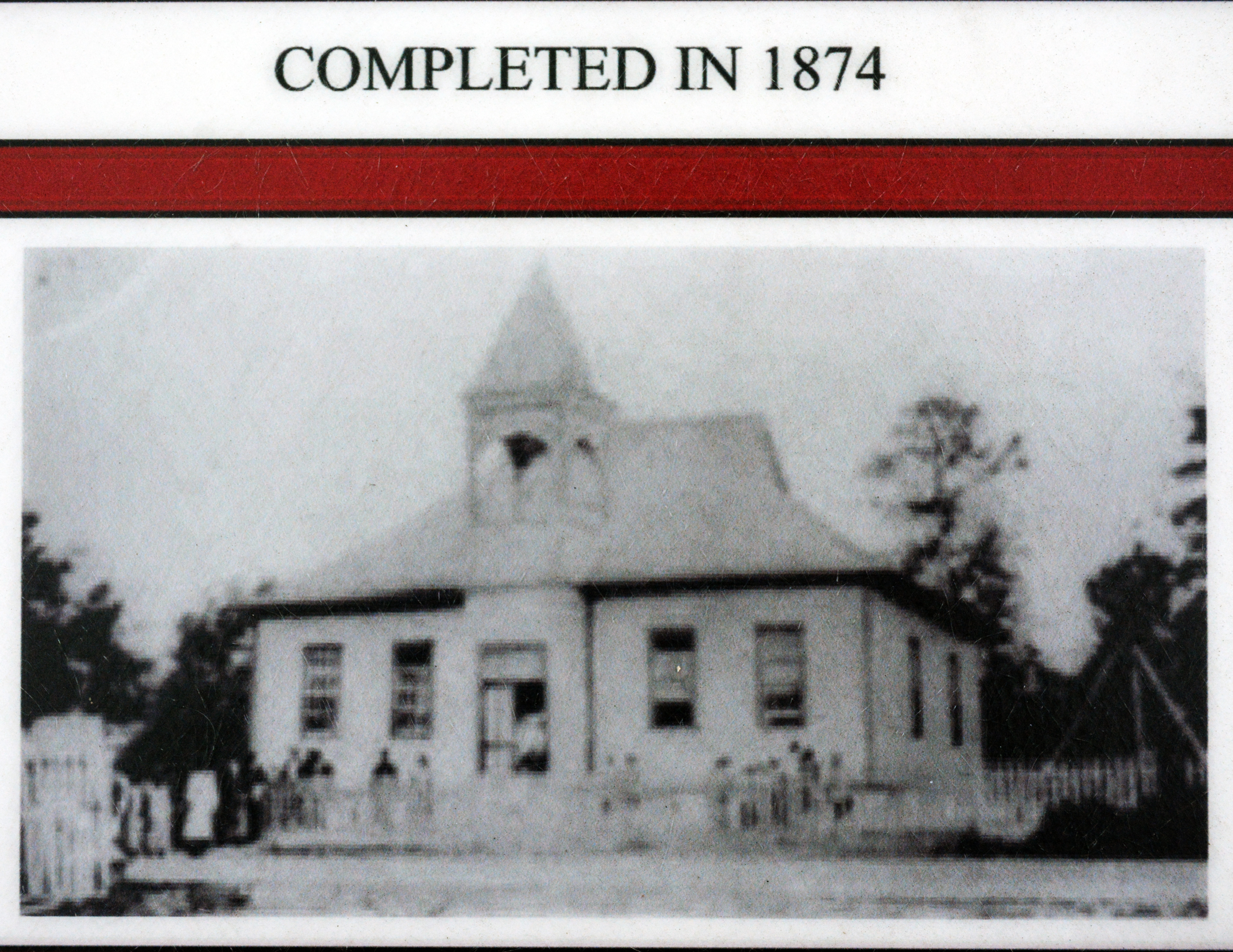
Older building, ca. 1874

== See also ==
- List of museums focused on African Americans
