= George Awsumb =

Norwegian-American architect

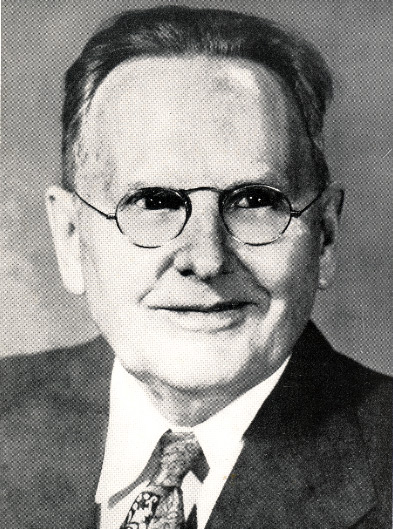
- Born: July 20, 1880; Skien, Telemark, Norway
- Died: November 24, 1959 (aged 79); Memphis, Tennessee, U.S.
- Education: University of Illinois at Urbana–Champaign
- Occupation: Architect
- Spouse: Ella Mabel (Wells) Awsumb
- Children: Wells, Georgianna & Richard
- Buildings: Baron Hirsch Synagogue; Dermon Building; Dorchester Academy; Eau Claire City Hall; Ellis Auditorium; Idlewild Presbyterian Church

George Awsumb (20 July 1880 – 24 November 1959) was a prominent Norwegian-American architect in the first half of the 20th century. Awsumb defined architecture as "frozen music" designed for the "man on the street". He was influenced by his early life, European travels, and prevailing architectural trends of his time. His eclectic, progressive portfolio included neoclassical, Gothic Revival, Prairie School, and International Style designs. Several buildings that Awsumb designed have been in continuous use in the American Midwest and South for over 100 years. In particular, Awsumb began a family architectural legacy that contributed to the progress and development of Memphis, Tennessee.

Awsumb's most notable works are grand public buildings and places of worship. Awsumb is credited with designing "some of the most beautiful churches in the South," including Idlewild Presbyterian Church, called "the South’s Cathedral of Presbyterianism". He designed several buildings which are listed on the National Register of Historic Places for their architecture, including the Dermon Building and the Baron Hirsch Synagogue in Memphis, Tennessee, and Dorchester Academy near Midway, Georgia.

== Early life ==
George Awsumb was born on July 20, 1880, in Skien, Norway to father Sigvard Johannessen of Vinger and mother Amborlina (reportedly Throndsen) of Porsgrunn. George's original given name is not reported. The family was landless as Sigvard and his siblings had sold their stake in a small portion of the Aasum farmstead near Vinger prior to George's birth. Living conditions for the family in Norway were meager with limited economic opportunity.

On May 31, 1883, at the age of 3, he emigrated with his family to the United States aboard the Thingvalla steamship's Christinia-Christiansand-New York line. After porting in New York on June 16, they settled in Whitewater, Wisconsin, alongside extended family members from Norway. The family assumed its ancestral farmstead, Aasum, for its surname and adopted anglicanized spellings of their names.

George Awsumb spent the rest of his childhood in Wisconsin, where his father, later known as Sigvart J. Awsumb, worked as a cutter in a tailor shop, and he was cared for by his mother Amborlina Awsumb. His family eventually moved from Whitewater to Eau Claire, Wisconsin. The family, including George when not in school, took up the building trade, constructing large barns.

== Education ==
George Awsumb attended high school in Whitewater, graduating in 1898 as the youngest member of his class. He attended the University of Wisconsin in Madison for the 1900–1901 academic year to study engineering. He later matriculated at the University of Illinois in Champaign to study architecture, and completed his Bachelor of Science degree in 1906. His senior thesis formulated a neoclassical design for a new Wisconsin state capitol building using a Greek-cross plan. After receiving his degree, Awsumb worked at J.C. Llewellyn in Chicago for two years as a draftsman from 1906 to 1908.

Awsumb was awarded a $500 scholarship from the Chicago Architecture Club in 1908 to study architectural works in Norway, England, France, and Italy. He traveled around England and France on bicycle and found inspiration from the design of Gothic cathedrals. Returning to Chicago, he taught design at the Chicago School of Architecture for two years. He again traveled to Europe in 1910 visiting Italy, France, Holland, Belgium, and England. On the second trip, he decided to specialize in public buildings. The European cathedrals, palaces, and other magnificent buildings he encountered influenced some of his later designs.

== Career ==
=== Chicago ===
George Awsumb's early career took root in Chicago. Between 1906 and 1913, when not travelling, he was a draftsman for the architectural offices of J.C. Llewellyn, Mundie and Jensen, Marchash and Fox, and Von Holst and Fyfe. Awsumb operated his own architectural firm in Chicago from 1913 to 1919. Awsumb also served as president of the Chicago Architectural Club. In 1915, Awsumb designed the Charles C. and Katharyn Sniteman House in prairie style. In 1916, Awsumb designed the Eau Claire City Hall (Eau Claire, Wisconsin), modelling it after the Petit Trianon, though not as a complete copy. He has been described as both a "successful" and "struggling" architect during this time period.

=== Memphis ===
==== Partnership with Pfeil ====
In 1919, at the request of Memphis-based architect Charles O. Pfeil, Awsumb co-entered a competition with him to design the Memphis Municipal Auditorium. After winning the competition, Awsumb relocated to Memphis, Tennessee, forming the Pfeil & Awsumb partnership that lasted until 1929. In addition to the auditorium, Awsumb and the firm designed the Derman Building, Humes and Southside high schools, and Idewild Presbyterian Church.

==== Awsumb firms ====
Breaking from Pfeil in 1929, Awsumb formed an architectural firm under his name his own name. He designed the Dorchester Academy Boys' Dormitory in 1935 and Brownlee Hall and Sweeney Hall in 1936, among other works. His sons Wells Awsumb and Richard Awsumb joined his practice after their military service in World War II. Together, George Awsumb & Sons designed many dozens of completed buildings in Memphis and the region, including places of worship for variety of faiths, recreation centers, schools, private residents, offices, and other gathering places.

=== List of significant architectural works ===
- Charles C. and Katharyn Sniteman House (1915), Prairie School-style, 319 Hewett St., Nellisville, Wisconsin (Awsumb, George), NRHP-listed
- City Hall (1916), 203 S. Farwell St., Eau Claire, Wisconsin (Awsumb, George), NRHP-listed
- Municipal Auditorium and Market House (1920–24), on Main Street, Memphis, Tennessee
- Humes Junior High School (1923–24), 659 Manassas, Memphis, Tennessee, NRHP-listed
- Dermon Building (1925) Memphis, Tennessee, NRHP-listed
- Idlewild Presbyterian Church (1926–27), 1750 Union Avenue, Memphis, Tennessee (Awsumb, George), NRHP-listed
- First United Methodist Church (1934), 2416 West Cloverdale Park, Montgomery, Alabama, NRHP-listed
- Dorchester Academy Boys' Dormitory (1935), 8787 East Oglethorpe Highway (U.S. Highway 84), Midway, Georgia (Awsumb, George), NRHP-listed
- Lauderdale Courts Public Housing Project (1935–38) (with other designers)
- Brownlee Hall and Sweeney Hall (1936), two Colonial Revival buildings, and the quadrangle (1936) of LeMoyne-Owen College in Memphis, Tennessee (Awsumb, George). These are three of the five elements of NRHP-listed LeMoyne College Historic District.
- Samuel Abraham Chapel (1941) at Baron Hirsch Cemetery in Memphis, Tennessee
- Walker Wellford House (1948–49), Memphis, the only International Style house in Memphis, Tennessee
- Baron Hirsch Synagogue (1950–52) in Memphis, Tennessee, NRHP-listed, also included in the Vollintine Hills Historic District

Note: National Register of Historic Places (NRHP)

== Photo gallery ==
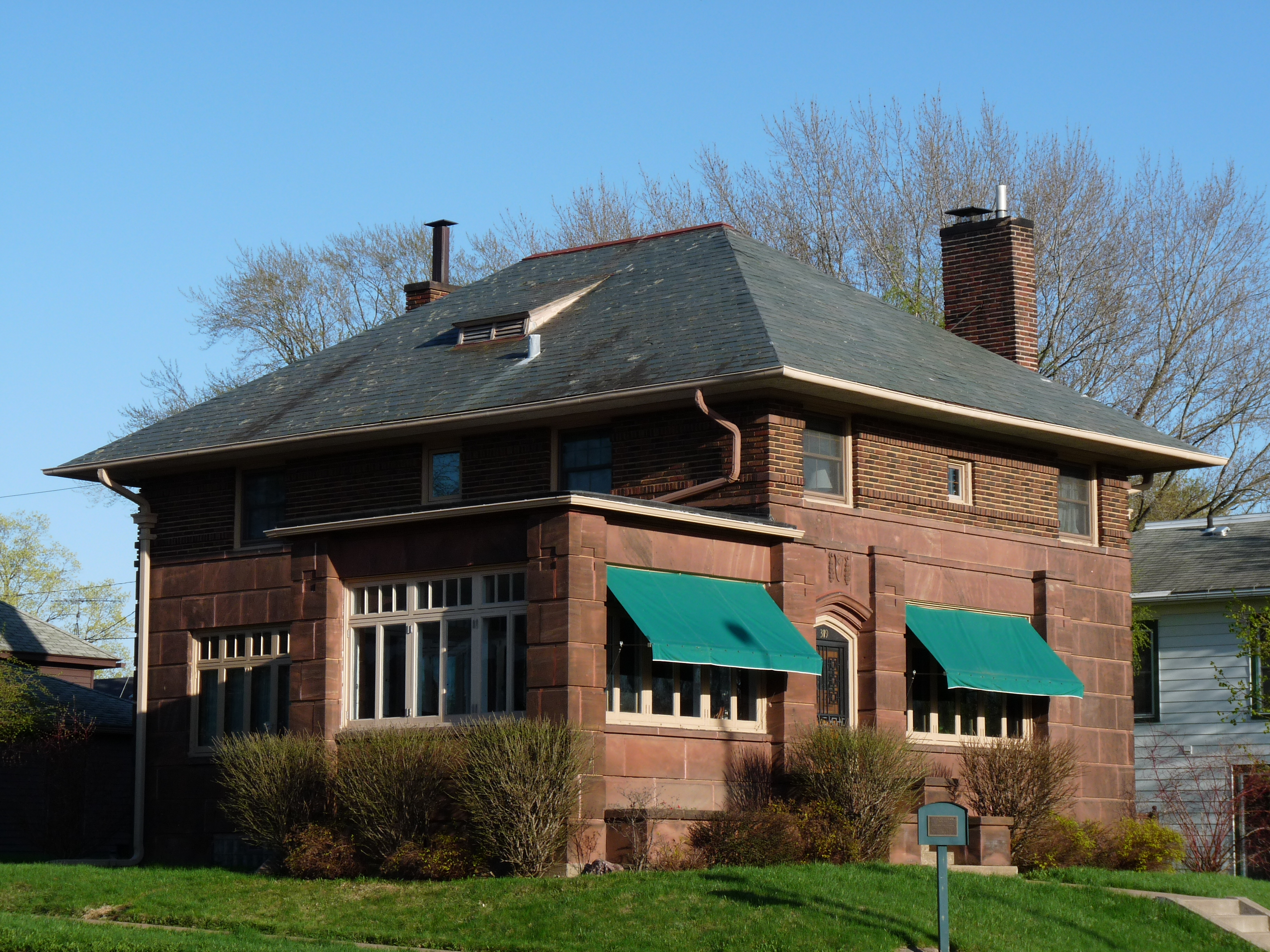
Charles C. and Katharyn Sniteman House in Neillsville, Wisconsin. Prairie School (1915).

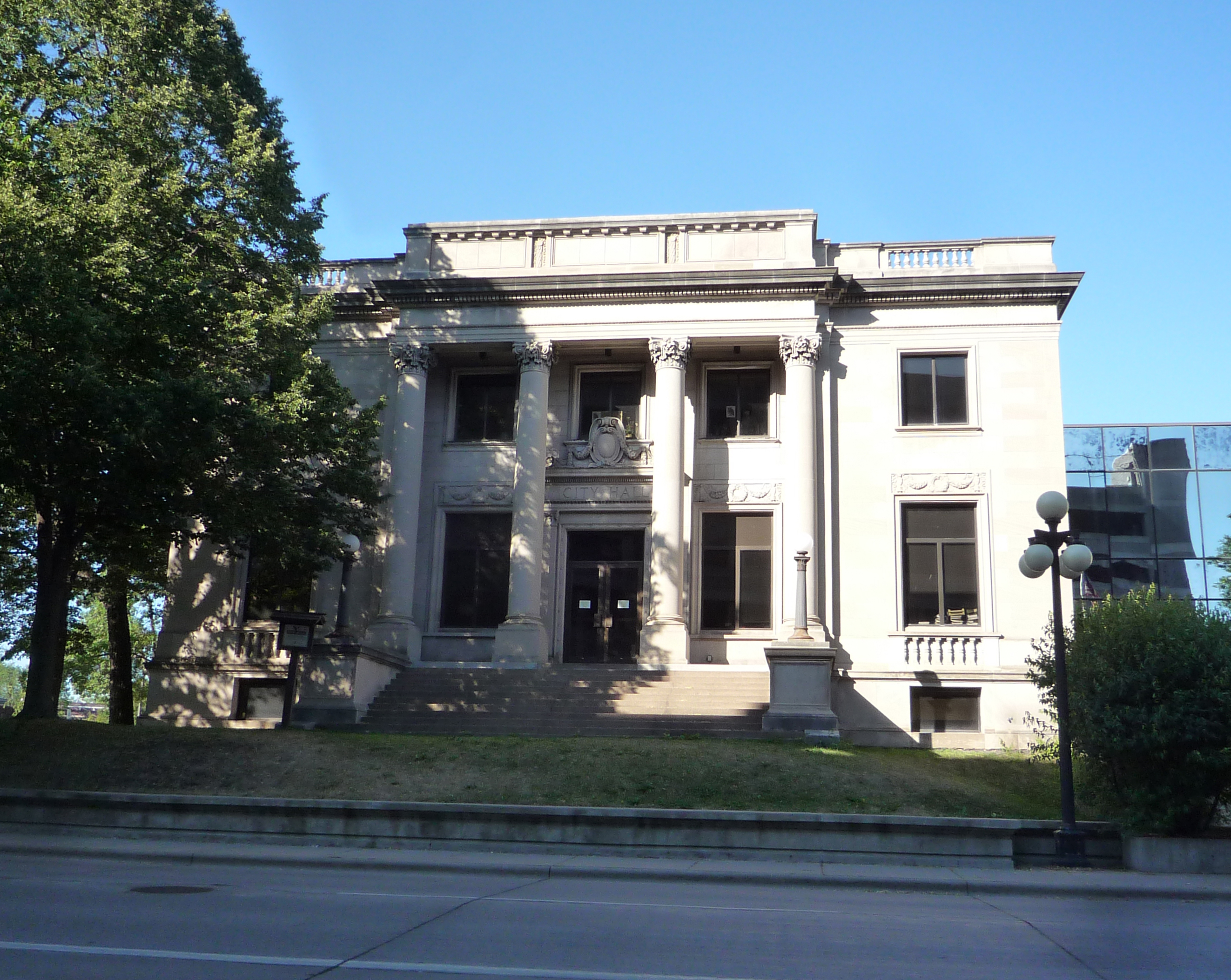
City Hall in Eau Claire, Wisconsin. Neoclassical (1916).

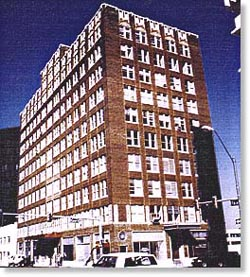
Dermon Building in Memphis, Tennessee. Renaissance Revival (1925).

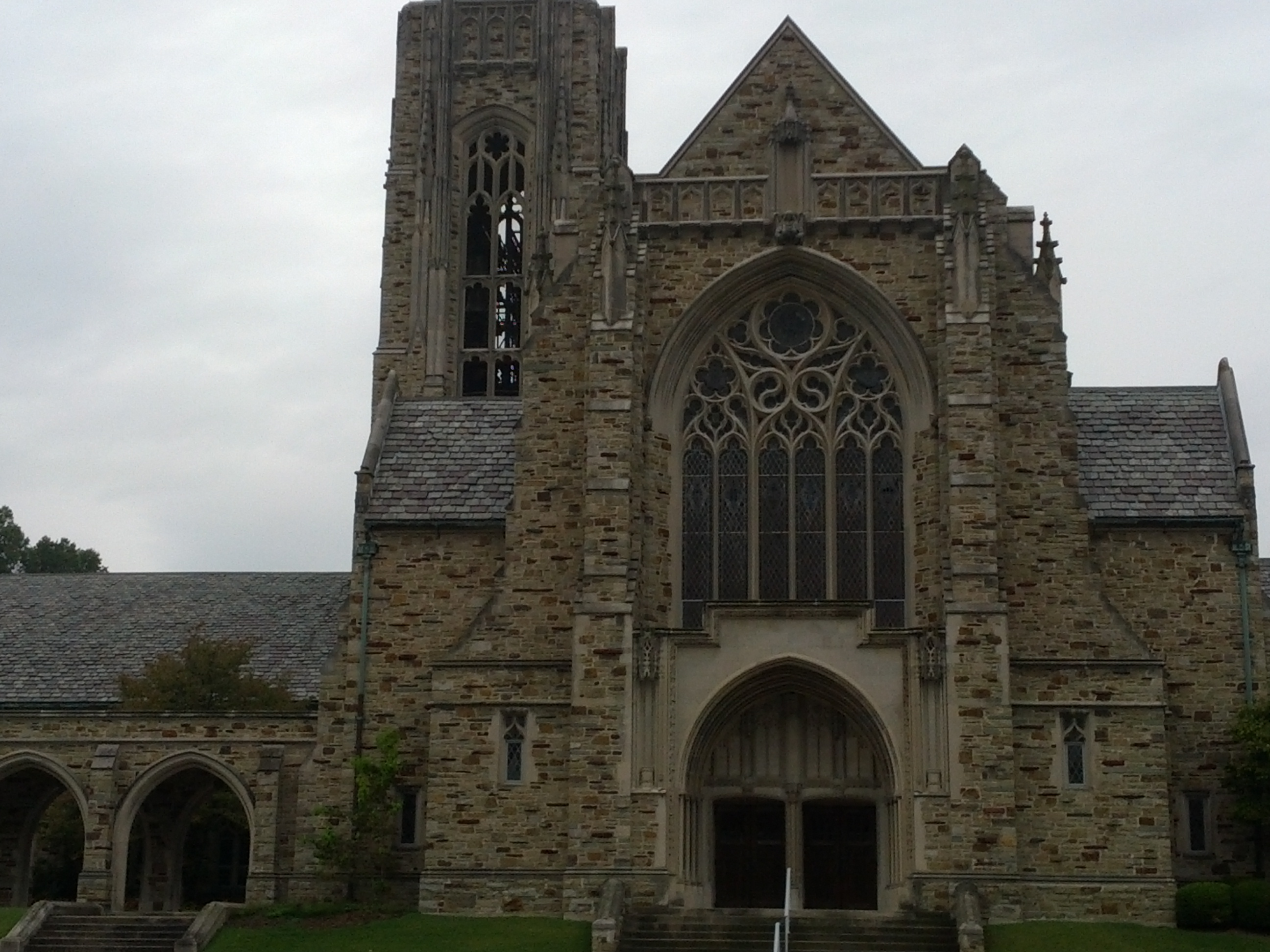
Idlewild Presbyterian Church in Memphis, Tennessee. Gothic Revival (1926).

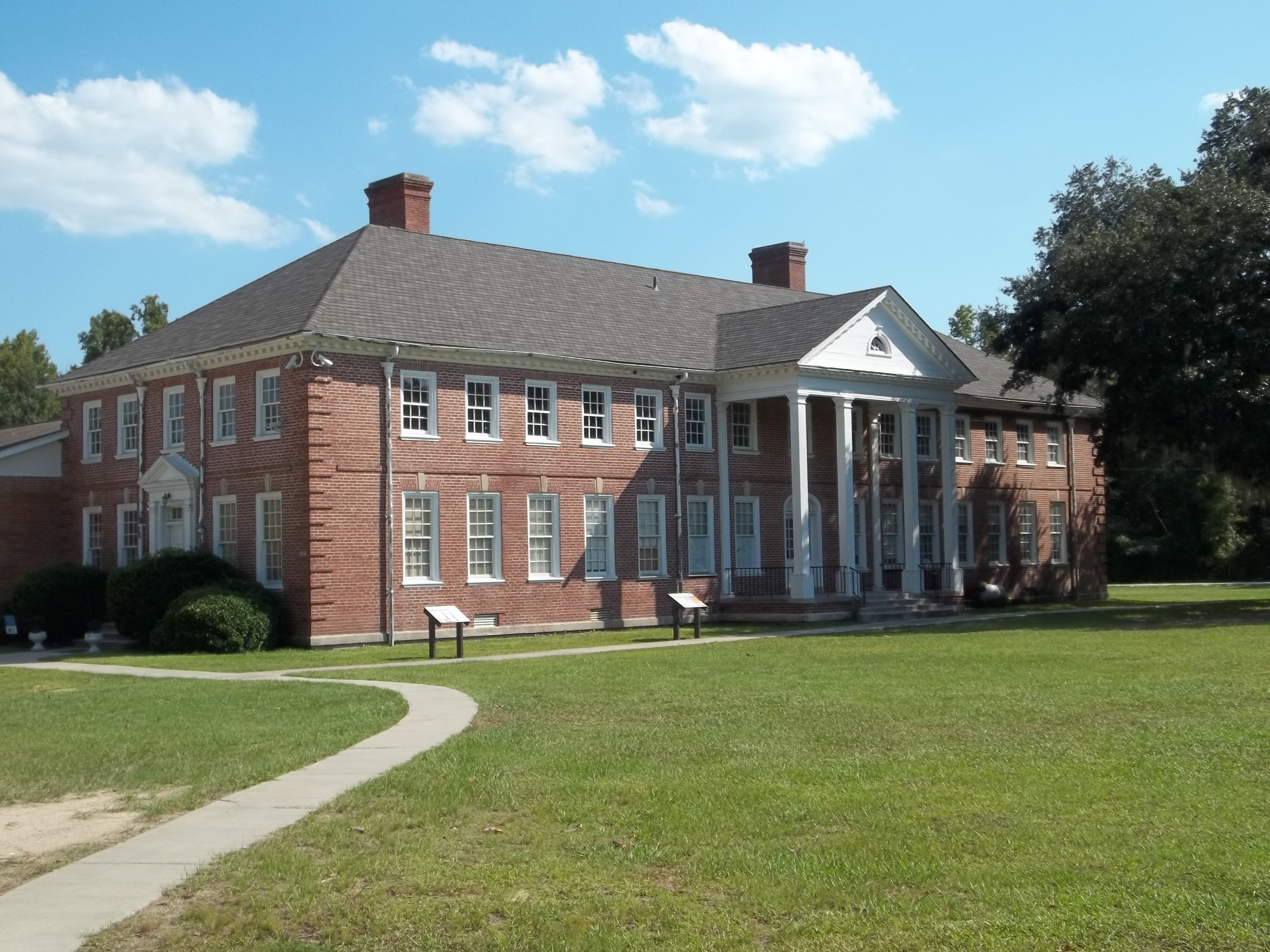
Dorchester Academy in Midway, Georgia. Colonial Revival (1935).

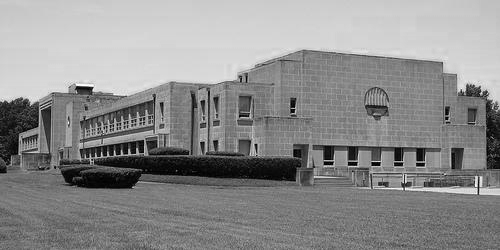
Baron Hirsch Synagogue in Memphis, Tennessee. International Style (1950).

== Personal life ==
Norway-born George Awsumb became a naturalized United States citizen at the age of 25 at Eau Claire County, Wisconsin, on June 28, 1906. He married Ella Mabel Wells, a Lincoln, Nebraska, native and University of Nebraska alumna, at the First Methodist Church in Glen Ellyn, Illinois, on January 1, 1915. They had three children: Wells Awsumb, Georgianna (Awsumb) Ensminger, and Richard Awsumb.

George Awsumb moved his family from Illinois to Memphis, Tennessee, in 1919. They became members of the Idlewild Presbyterian Church. Awsumb designed the church's Gothic Revival style building in 1926. His children Georgiana and Richard are two of the "Faces of Idlewild" that are carved into the stone above the cathedral's entrance. George Awsumb was also a member of the several architectural leagues and civic groups in Memphis.

George Awsumb died in Memphis, Tennessee, at the age of 79 in 1959.

== Legacy ==
George Awsumb began a family architectural legacy in the City of Memphis and elsewhere. The George Awsumb firm became the George Awsumb & Sons firm in 1946 when his children Richard Awsumb and Wells Awsumb joined him in the profession. Wells is credited with designing the parish hall at Trinity Church (Mason, Tennessee), which is listed on the National Register of Historic Places. George Awsumb's grandchild Carl Awsumb was also an architect. Carl Awsumb helped establish the first architectural training school in Cameroon as a U.S. Peace Corps volunteer in the country from 1965 to 1966. He later continued the operation of an architectural firm in Memphis under the family's surname into the 21st century.

A collection of Awsumb family architectural works is located at Memphis and Shelby County Room of the Memphis Public Libraries. Its significance to Memphis is noted:

This multi generational collection captures the artistic vision of the Awsumb architects and verifies their valuable contributions to the city’s progress and development. George Awsumb, the first Awsumb architect, defined architecture as "frozen music" designed for the "man on the street" (The Egyptians, 1941 April 17). Indeed, this Memphis architect, his two sons Wells and Richard, and grandson Carl reshaped the traditional Classic design for Memphians, providing residences, churches, schools, theaters, and an auditorium for the public to enjoy.
