= ASUM =

ASUM may stand for:

== Organizations ==
- All Saints University of Medicine, a medical school in Aruba
- Amateur Swimming Union of Malaysia, a national governing body

== See also ==
- Åsum (disambiguation)
