= Sugar Hill =

Sugar Hill may refer to:

== Places ==
In the United States:

- Sugar Hill, Georgia, a city
- Sugar Hill, New Hampshire, a town
- Sugar Hill, Manhattan, New York, a section of Harlem
- Sugar Hill, Pennsylvania, an unincorporated community
- Sugar Hill Historic District (Detroit), Michigan
- Sugar Hill (club), a blues and jazz club in San Francisco
- Sugar Hill (Jacksonville), Florida, a historic African-American neighborhood in Jacksonville, Florida

== Film and television ==
- Sugar Hill (1974 film), a blaxploitation horror movie, later edited for TV and retitled The Zombies of Sugar Hill
- Sugar Hill (1994 film), a drama starring Wesley Snipes as drug dealer Roemello Skuggs
- Sugar Hill (TV program), the 1999 pilot for the sitcom Battery Park
- "Sugar Hill", a 2019 television episode of Dolly Parton's Heartstrings, titled after her song

== Companies ==
- Sugar Hill Records (bluegrass label), a label whose artists include Nickel Creek and Chris Hillman
- Sugar Hill Records (hip hop label), an early hip hop label, whose artists included The Sugarhill Gang
- SugarHill Recording Studios, Houston, Texas

== Music ==
- "Sugar Hill" (song), a 1995 single by AZ
- "Sugar Hill", written and sung by Dolly Parton on her album Halos & Horns

== See also ==
- The Sugarhill Gang, an American hip hop group
