= Sanford Augustus Brookins =

American architect and builder (1877–1968)

- Born: May 9, 1877; Macon, Georgia, U.S.
- Died: June 22, 1968 (aged 91); Compton, Los Angeles County, California, U.S.
- Other names: Sanford Augustus Brookings, Sanford Brookins, S. A. Brookins
- Education: Dorchester Academy
- Occupations: Architect, builder, construction firm owner, businessperson
- Years active: 1916–1965
- Spouse: Leola Calloway

Sanford Augustus Brookins (1877–1968), also known as Sanford Augustus Brookings, was an American architect, builder, and businessperson. In the early 20th century, he was one of two African-American architect-builders in Jacksonville, Florida. He was instrumental in the formation of a few key neighborhoods, including Sugar Hill, Durkee Gardens, and Riverside within Jacksonville, as well as the seaside community of American Beach.

== Biography ==
Sanford Augustus Brookins was born on May 9, 1877, in Macon, Georgia. He attended the Dorchester Academy in Liberty County, Georgia.

In 1904, Brookins moved to Jacksonville, Florida eventually settling in the Sugar Hill neighborhood. He worked as a construction foreman for twelve years, before starting his own residential construction business in 1916. Brookins primarily designed and built houses in the Sugar Hill neighborhood; the newer neighborhood of Durkee Gardens; and Riverside, a historically white neighborhood. He is also credited with designing two beach cottages at American Beach, an early oceanfront resort developed specifically for African Americans in Florida. By 1925, he had designed and built more than 150 residential buildings.

He retired in 1965, and had moved to Compton, California. Brookins died June 22, 1968, in Compton.

== Works ==
- Brookins residence, 601 West 8th Street (1924), Sugar Hill, Jacksonville, Florida
- 2336 Gilmore Street (1925), Riverside, Jacksonville, Florida
- 2152 Herschel Street (1925), Riverside, Jacksonville, Florida
- 5485 Waldron Street (1936), Jacksonville, Florida
- 1187 West 10th Street (1940), Jacksonville, Florida
- 1197 Durkee Drive North (1941), Jacksonville, Florida
- 1125 West 8th Avenue (1944), Jacksonville, Florida
- 1189 Durkee Drive North (1945), Jacksonville, Florida
- 5475 Gregg Street (1949), American Beach, Florida; part of the NRHP-listed historic district
- Brookins cottage, 5485 Waldon Street, American Beach, Florida

== See also ==
- African-American architects
