= Dermon Building =

Coordinates: 35.1457°N 90.0497°W

- U.S. National Register of Historic Places
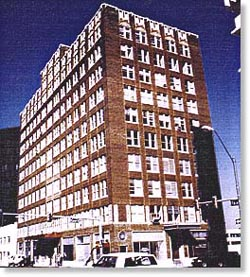
- Dermon Building in the 1990s
- Location: 46 N. 3rd St. Memphis, Tennessee
- Built: 1925
- Architect: Charles O. Pfeil and George Awsumb
- Architectural style: Renaissance Revival, Art Deco
- NRHP reference No.: 84003688
- Added to NRHP: March 15, 1984

The Dermon Building is a historic building in Memphis, Tennessee, listed on the National Register of Historic Places. It was constructed in 1925 by Dave Dermon at a cost of around $800,000. From the time it was constructed, until 1983, it was the home of Dave Dermon Company, and Dave Dermon Insurance. 'Papa' sold the building in the 1930s, and although it has changed hands many times, it is still known as the Dermon Building today.

It was listed on the National Register in recognition of its local architectural significance and its association with its builder Dave Dermon, who was a prominent Memphis real estate developer in the years between World War I and the Great Depression. In downtown Memphis, the building is second only to the Kress Building in displaying the colorful use of glazed architectural terra cotta from the 1920s.

== Description ==
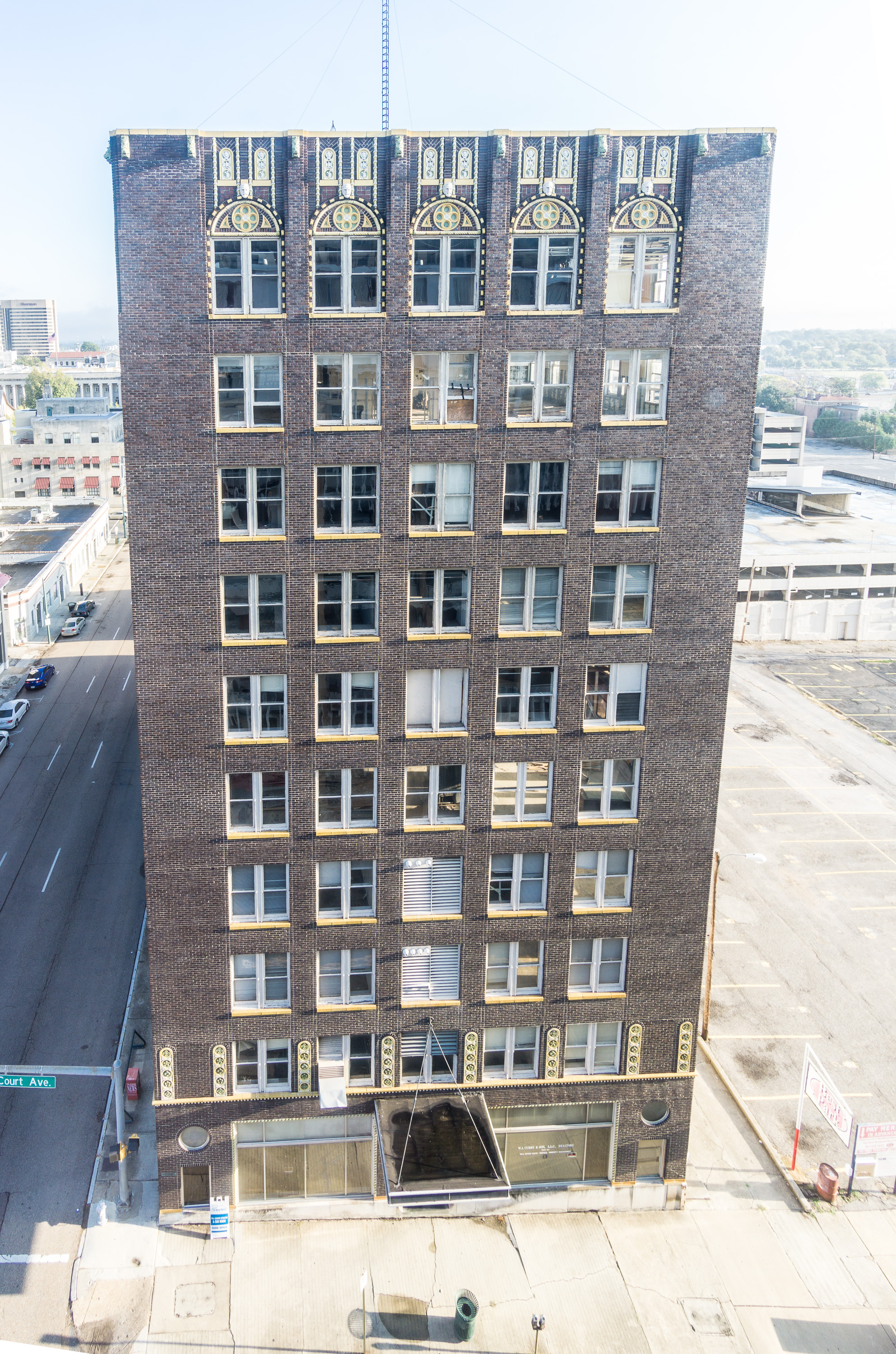
View of vacant building in 2016, from hotel across Court St

The Dermon Building is a ten-story structure, rectangular in plan, 149 feet wide by 75 feet deep. It is built of dark brown brick with Renaissance details in yellow, green, and white terra cotta. Because it is surrounded by low commercial buildings, the colorful building is a prominent structure on the edge of the city's skyline. As of 1984, the exterior had received only minor alterations and the building was judged to retain its architectural integrity to a high degree.

The structure has a cast-in-place, steel reinforced concrete frame with fifteen bays across the front (N. Third Street) and rear elevations and five bays across the side elevations. A low central penthouse of three bays houses the mechanical core of the building. Each facade of the building is clad with dark brown brick with yellow, green, and white terra cotta trim. The front (west) and side (north and south) facades are much richer in ornamentation than the rear (east) facade. Terra cotta rope molding in yellow, green, and white provides a border around each of the storefronts. Separation between the first and second stories is defined by a dentilated belt course. Between the, second-story windows are vertical bands of yellow and green terra cotta rosettes in five patterns.

All the windows are one-over-one double-hung sash with yellow terra cotta sills. The exterior brown brick skin rises up to the tenth floor in one even plane. The grouped windows of the tenth floor and penthouse on the front and side facades have a foliated terra cotta border and a tympanum with a central quatrefoil. Above each tympanum is a bearded male mask between a pair of tall, narrow panels with terra cotta medallions of a squirrel, eagle, and cherub. Decorative gargoyle waterspouts of green terra cotta and a simple yellow terra cotta coping terminate the flat roofline. Some brick has been replaced on the fourth, fifth, and sixth floors, because of a small fire in 1982. The ground floor storefronts have signs that cover the tops of the windows and cover a small round window which was part of the original design.

The first floor lobby has gray marble floors. The hallways on the upper stories have their original terrazzo floors but several of the offices have been re-modeled at various times.

== Dave Dermon ==
Dermon came to Memphis at the turn of the century as a young Jewish immigrant from Kiev, Ukraine. Not long after he arrived, he established in 1909 a general tinsmith shop on Third and Vance in downtown Memphis. He also engaged in real estate development, initially making several lucrative land deals in the Vance area and constructing a few buildings there. In 1915 his interest shifted to the section of Union Avenue between downtown and the fashionable midtown residential areas. Here he established the city's major automobile showrooms, tire companies, and related businesses. In addition to buying and selling land in the area, Dermon constructed buildings for the city's Dodge and Buick dealerships as well as for various tire companies. He so transformed the area into what was known as "Auto Row" from the late teens to the early 1960s.

Dermon was also responsible for the construction and development of many apartment buildings and subdivisions in midtown and north Memphis during the 1920s and later. These included the Overton Park Court Apartments on Poplar Avenue, the city's largest apartment building at the time, the Hanover Apartments, and the Avalon in addition to subdivisions such as Jackson Terrace, Palmer Hills, and Kings Park. By the time of Dermon's death in 1963, the assets of his company were estimated at 15 million dollars. In view of his immigrant background, his quick rise to considerable wealth and prominence was particularly impressive.

== History ==
The office building for the Dermon Company was constructed in 1925 and designed by the prominent Memphis architects, Charles O. Pfeil (1871–1927) and George Awsumb (1880–1959). Before his association with Awsumb in 1919, Pfeil was in partnership with George M. Shaw (1870–1919). They designed many important buildings in Memphis during the early twentieth century, including the Tennessee Trust Building (1906), Fire Engine House #1 (1910), and the Memphis Police Station (1911), all of which are on the National Register.

Soon after winning the competition in 1921 for the Memphis Municipal Auditorium, Awsumb moved to Memphis from Chicago, where he had been a successful architect. In partnership with Pfeil, the final auditorium design and construction was completed, as well as the plans for Humes (1926) and Southside (1927) High Schools and Idlewild Presbyterian Church (1929). The Dermon Building is a unique exception to their usual conservative use of color. The structure's unusual color scheme of brown, yellow, green, and white has made it a noteworthy building in Memphis since it was constructed.

Starting in 2010, the building was largely or completely vacant. In 2016, a local developer announced plans to completely renovate the building and launch it as a hotel in the style of the Madison Hotel and Exchange Building, two other historic office buildings which were converted to hotels.

== See also ==
- National Register of Historic Places listings in Shelby County, Tennessee
