= John Bramlett =

American football player (1941–2014)

No. 56, 57, 62
- Position: Linebacker

Personal information
- Born: July 7, 1941; Memphis, Tennessee, U.S.
- Died: October 23, 2014 (aged 73); Memphis, Tennessee, U.S.
- Listed height: 6 ft 1 in (1.85 m)
- Listed weight: 220 lb (100 kg)

Career information
- High school: Humes (Memphis)
- College: Memphis State (1959–1962)
- AFL draft: 1965: undrafted

Career history
- Denver Broncos (1965–1966); Miami Dolphins (1967–1968); Boston Patriots (1969–1970); Green Bay Packers (1971)*; Atlanta Falcons (1971)
- * Offseason or practice squad member only

Awards and highlights
- 2× AFL All-Star (1966, 1967); Memphis Tigers No. 64 retired

Career statistics
- Sacks: 22.5
- Fumble recoveries: 4
- Interceptions: 10
- Interception yards: 128
- Total touchdowns: 3
- Stats at Pro Football Reference

John "Bull" Bramlett (July 7, 1941 – October 23, 2014) was an American professional football linebacker who played from 1965 to 1971 on four teams, the Denver Broncos, Miami Dolphins, and Boston Patriots in the American Football League (AFL) and the Patriots and Atlanta Falcons in the National Football League (NFL). He was a twice AFL All-Star. Bramlett served as a minister before his death.

Bramlett was an All-State and All-American at Humes High School in Memphis and played college football for the Memphis State Tigers, where he was named an honorable mention All-American his senior year. Bramlett signed a professional baseball contract with the St. Louis Cardinals, but was kicked out of baseball after a few years after getting into trouble. Bramlett then signed a contract with the Denver Broncos and was named runner-up AFL Rookie of the year behind Joe Namath in 1965.

Bramlett only lasted two seasons with the Broncos, making one appearance in the Pro Bowl before being traded to the Miami Dolphins for a fourth-round pick in the 1968 NFL/AFL draft. He played two seasons with Miami, making another Pro Bowl appearance, before being traded to the Patriots along with quarterback Kim Hammond in exchange for Nick Buoniconti in 1969.

With the Patriots, Bramlett was named the Most Valuable Player for the team in 1970, but also got in more trouble and was nicknamed "the Meanest Man in Football".. Bramlett was then traded to the Green Bay Packers for Rich Moore. However, he balked at reporting to Green Bay and was released by the Packers before the 1971 season. He was picked up by the Atlanta Falcons and played one season for them before retiring.

Bramlett is a member of the Tennessee Sports Hall of Fame.

== Post-football career ==
In 1973, Bramlett became a Christian and abandoned his wild lifestyle. He was active in Christian ministry for many years. He resided in Memphis with his wife, Nancy, until his death. He had two sons, Don and Andy. His ministry was John Bramlett Ministries.

Larry Csonka and Jim Kiick, who were rookies on the Dolphins in 1968, tell several amusing stories about Bramlett in their book Always on the Run.

Bramlett also wrote his own autobiography, called Taming the Bull: The John "Bull" Bramlett Story (Thomas Nelson Publishers, 1989). In 1990, his story was dramatized through Pacific Garden Mission's Unshackled! radio ministry, airing as program #2070.

== Death ==
Bramlett died on October 23, 2014, in Memphis, according to the Shelby County mayor's office.

== See also ==
- List of American Football League players
