= Awsumb =

Norwegian topographic surname

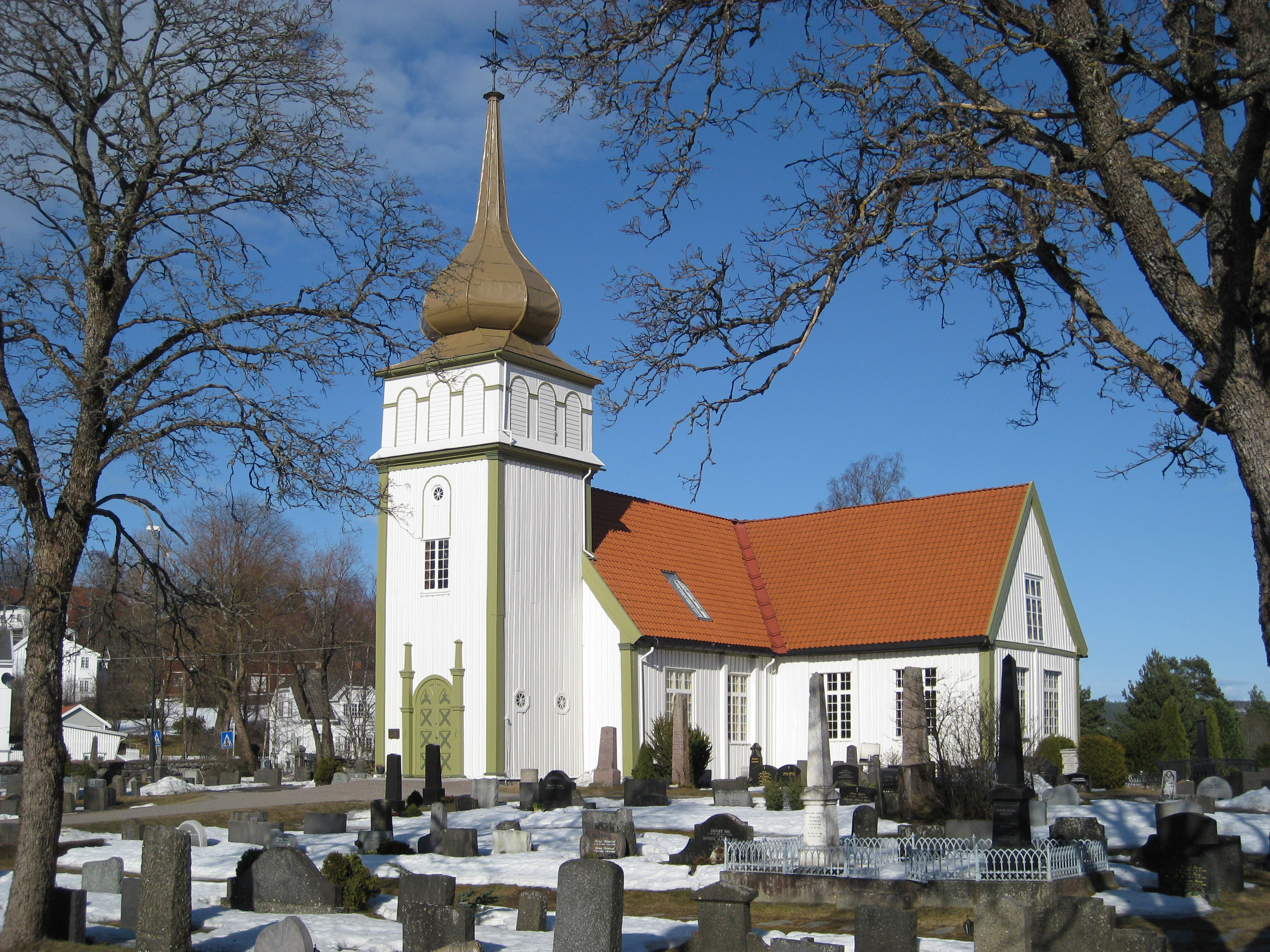
- Vinger Church in Hedmark

Origin
- Meaning: ås = hill or ridge
- Region of origin: Vinger, Norway

Other names
- Variant forms: Åsum, Aasum, and Aasumb

Awsumb is a Norwegian toponymic surname. It is derived from an ancient farm in Vinger, Norway. The spelling Awsumb is an anglicization of Aasumb used by some Norwegian emigrants to the United States. The Old Norse farm name Aasumb consists of the words for ridge (ås) and home (umb). Aasumb is an older, variant form of Åsum, which is a common surname and place name in Scandinavia.

== People with the surname ==
- George Awsumb (1880–1959), architect
- Gwen Robinson Awsumb (1915–2003), politician
- Roger Awsumb (1928–2002), children's television personality

== See also ==
Åsum (disambiguation)
