= Porter-Leath House =

Historic house in Tennessee, United States

- Porter--Leath Home
- U.S. National Register of Historic Places
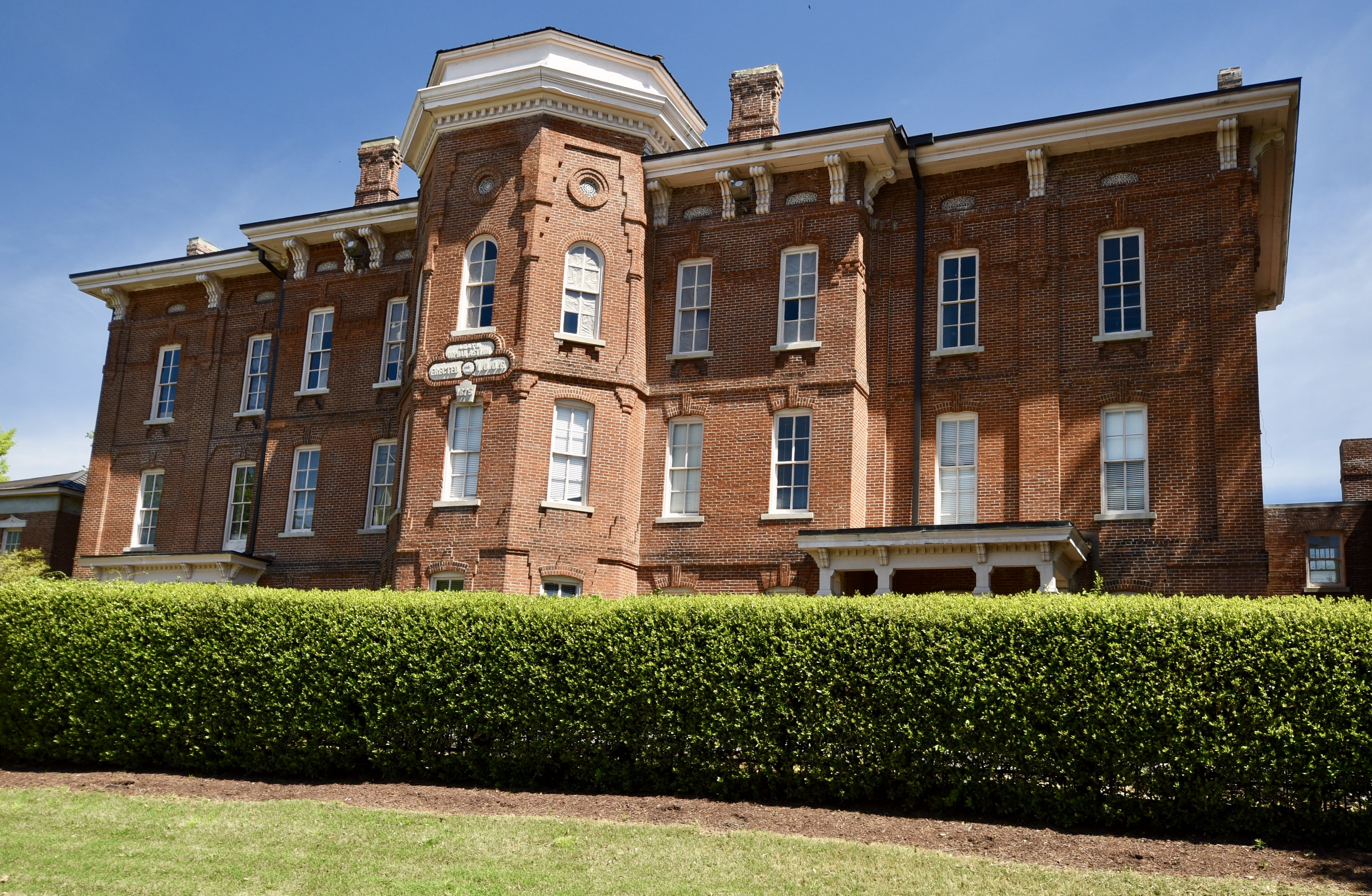
- The Porter-Leath House in 2017

- Location within Tennessee Location within the United States
- Location: 850 North Manassas Street, Memphis, Tennessee
- Coordinates: 35°9′54″N 90°1′53″W
- Area: 9 acres (3.6 ha)
- Built: 1856, 1875, 1912, 1927 & 1929
- Architectural style: Mission/Spanish Revival, Italianate
- NRHP reference No.: 79002471
- Added to NRHP: May 8, 1979

The Porter-Leath House is a historic house in Memphis, Tennessee, USA. It has also been known as the Porter Leath Children's Center, which was originally chartered in 1850 as the Protestant Widows' and Orphans' Asylum. It was named after Dr David Tinsley Porter after he made a donation to the asylum in 1904. In 1951, it was renamed the Porter-Leath Home. Portions of the house were built in 1856, 1875, 1912, 1927 and 1929. The 1875 portion was designed by the architect E. C. Jones. It has been listed on the National Register of Historic Places since May 8, 1979.
