= Norra Åsum =

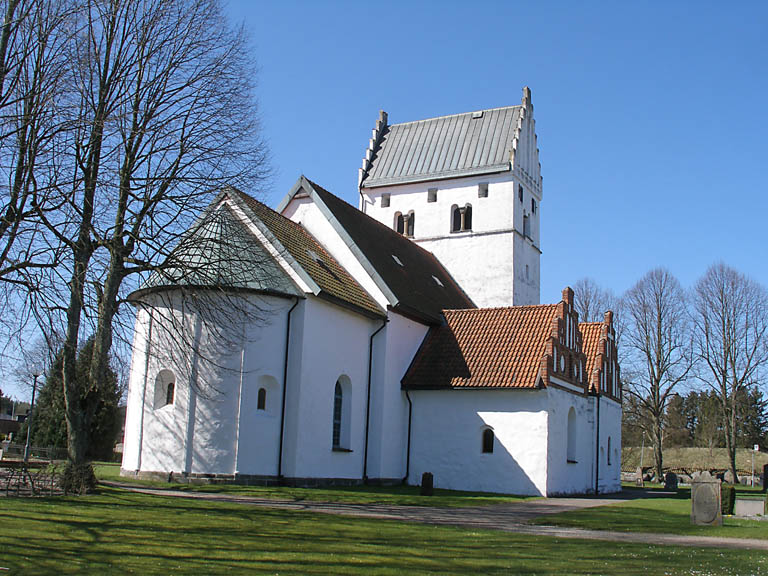
- Norra Åsum Church

- Location within Skåne Location within Sweden
- Coordinates: 55°59′N 14°09′E
- Country: Sweden
- Province: Skåne
- County: Skåne County
- Municipality: Kristianstad Municipality

Area
  - Total: 1.48 km^{2} (0.57 sq mi)

Population (31 December 2010)
  - Total: 1,264
  - Density: 852/km^{2} (2,210/sq mi)
- Time zone: UTC+1 (CET)
  - Summer (DST): UTC+2 (CEST)

Norra Åsum is a locality situated in Kristianstad Municipality, Skåne County, Sweden with 1,264 inhabitants in 2010.
