= Sugar Hill (Jacksonville) =

Sugar Hill is a historically middle class and predominantly African-American neighborhood in Jacksonville, Florida. It was established in the 1800s, was thriving by the end of the 19th century. It was largely destroyed by construction of the Jacksonville Expressway (now part of I-95), redevelopment plans including the expansion of a public hospital, as well as the end of segregation into the 1960s.

== History ==
The community included professionals such as doctors, lawyers, teachers, builders, clergy, morticians, and railroad employees. It began as a suburb serviced by a streetcar line and was home to various prominent residents including Abraham Lincoln Lewis, owner and founder of the Afro-American Life Insurance Co.; Henry Tookes, a pastor; Charles Anderson, owner of Anderson Bank; Emmet Washington, a doctor; Cecilia Washington Carr, an illustrator; Charles "Hoss" Singleton, a songwriter who wrote “Strangers in the Night” and built a home for his mom in Sugar Hill; William Raines, a high school principal; William Redmond, a doctor; Robert Butler, a pharmacist; and Sara Blocker, a schoolteacher who took the Duval County school system to court on behalf of African-American teachers. Two notable architects and builders in the area, who also lived in Sugar Hill included Sanford Augustus Brookins, and Joseph Haygood Blodgett.

The Ritz Theatre, the Henry Y. Tookes House, and St. Stephen's African Methodist Episcopal Church are among the few historic buildings that remain after I-95 was built through the community and redevelopment schemes pushed many remaining residents out whose homes were not already demolished.

The community included 30-acre Wilder Park, a community center, a baseball field, and the Wilder Park Public Library. A municipal waste incinerator polluted the area's ground with toxic dust.

Metro Jacksonville has reported on the area's history and published a series of historic and contemporary photos of area sights. The original Brewster Hospital building remains in LaVilla but the newer one was demolished.

A mosaic commemorating the neighborhood has been installed along the S-Line Rail Trail that passes through the neighborhood.
