= Porter-Leath =

Organization in Memphis, Tennessee

Porter-Leath, formerly known as the Children's Bureau, is a non-profit organization based in Memphis, Tennessee that serves children and families in the area. Porter-Leath was founded in 1850 as an orphanage and has since grown to six program service areas. The agency retains the early nature of its mission by providing foster care and has also expanded to early childhood education.

The agency remains in its 1852 location on the 9 acres (36,000 m^{2}) of land donated by Mrs. Sarah Leath. The original orphanage building remains in use as administrative office space. The three buildings built before 1900 are on the National Register of Historic Places. Porter-Leath has off-site program locations including Head Start facilities on American Way and in the Douglass neighborhood, as well as CareerPlace in Whitehaven.

== Early history ==
Prior to 1850, no organized asylum for orphans existed in Memphis, Shelby County, Tennessee. As a matter of fact, there were very few such institutions in the United States at that time. The fate of orphans in Memphis and elsewhere in those days was bleak. Unless relatives or friends took them in, such children were committed to the county poorhouse or permitted to run loose in the community. Because no provision was made for destitute widows, their lot was also in question. Life in Memphis during this time was not far from the world Charles Dickens described in Oliver Twist.

In 1850, the same year that the towns of Memphis and South Memphis merged to make the City of Memphis, a group of concerned Memphians including Mrs. Sarah Leath, Lyttleton Henderson, Mrs. Margaret Doyle and Mr. and Mrs. John Craft met at the Cumberland Presbyterian Church and organized the Protestant Widows' and Orphans' Asylum. Judge Pettit served as the first president of the Asylum's board of trustees. An outpouring of public support helped ensure a state charter for Memphis' first institution for the care of the destitute in 1851. The Asylum was incorporated the following year.

=== The First Orphans Asylum ===
Generous Memphis women donated spare furniture, homemade quilts, a wood-burning cook stove and other equipment to the Orphanage. The city's oldest organized asylum was first located on Exchange Street between Second and Third Streets (across from both the First Methodist and First Presbyterian Churches), and then on Poplar Avenue near Third Street (fronting the First Presbyterian Church). Among the most active contributors was Sarah Murphy Leath, who also served as a member of the Ladies Board of the Asylum. Mrs. Leath, a wealthy Memphis woman and member of First Presbyterian Church, had shown concern for the plight of orphans in the community. Herself a widow and mother of two sons of her own, Mrs. Leath had on three occasions taken orphans into her home.

By 1854, the little Orphanage had outgrown its crowded downtown quarters. Wishing to provide the Asylum with a larger facility and a permanent location, Sarah Leath donated 9 acres (36,000 m^{2}) of land one mile (1.6 km) northeast of the City north of New Raleigh Road (later renamed Jackson Avenue) and east of Boundary Road (later renamed Manassas Street). Money for the original small brick building was provided largely by public subscription from the citizenry. A two-story brick building (now the Shainberg Room) was completed on June 4, 1856, and became home to fourteen children; seven boys and seven girls. There was also a clapboard shotgun-styled building on the 9-acre (36,000 m^{2}) plot that was used as the school for the children.

=== Leath Orphan Asylum ===
Upon Mrs. Leath's death in 1858, her Estate provided the orphanage with twenty additional acres of land and money to start an Orphan's Educational Fund. In honor and recognition of Mrs. Leath's contributions to the welfare of the Asylum, the name of the organization was changed from the Protestant Widows' and Orphans' Asylum to the Leath Orphan Asylum by an Act of the 1857 and 1858 Tennessee Legislature. In addition to the Asylum's new name, a new organizational structure was adopted. A board of trustees made up of seven prominent men was appointed, but the day-to-day supervision of the Home remained with the twelve-member "Board of Lady Managers". These ladies of Memphis' Protestant churches paid the salary of the Asylum's matron.

=== Jane Ward –Matron of Leath Orphan Asylum ===
Because of her significant gift to the Orphanage and her active role as a member of the Ladies Board (forerunner of the Board of Lady Managers), Mrs. Leath was permitted to choose the Asylum's new matron in 1856. The choice proved a wise one. Miss Jane Ward had come to Memphis as governess for the children of the pastor of First Presbyterian Church and after visiting in the home of James T. Leath, the son of Sarah Murphy Leath, for an extended time, was offered and accepted the position of the first matron of the Orphanage. Miss Ward, who manifested a real mother's love for the children in her care, remained as matron of the Orphanage for seventeen years. During Miss Ward's employment, whenever a girl entered the Orphanage, a hope chest was started for her future dowry and into each chest went a quilt and other articles as available.

=== The Civil War ===
On June 6, 1862, the Union fleet defeated the Confederate naval forces in the First Battle of Memphis and Union troops occupied Memphis. In 1863 General Ulysses S. Grant designated the City of Memphis as the Union Army's Hospital and Supply Base to support his planned attack on the City of Vicksburg. However, none of these supplies were of benefit to the citizens of Memphis or the children at the Orphanage. Also, as a result of the war, the city's churchwomen could no longer contribute to the Home's support or pay Miss Ward's salary.

Nonetheless, Miss Ward stuck to her post and provided for the children by what she could raise on the Orphanage's twenty-nine acres of land. During this period, the Orphanage had to endure the confiscation of their poultry and most of their livestock and finally foraging Union soldiers took the last one of the Orphanage's milk cows. Furious at this outrageous act, Miss Ward rode to the Union military headquarters [either at what is now known as the Hunt-Phelan House on Beale Street or the Gayoso Hotel on the river bluff] in Memphis and proclaimed to the Union commander, "I do not propose that my children shall go without milk. I am coming back here until our cow is returned, or another cow given us." Eventually, even the Union Army gave in and Miss Ward got her cow.

=== The Yellow Fever Epidemic ===
After the war ended in 1865, Memphis soon became the fastest-growing city in the United States and in 1867 regained its designation as the "county seat". Along with this growth, however, came challenges. One of the most devastating was a series of yellow fever epidemics. Beginning in 1873 and continuing through 1879, the deadly fever killed more than 8,000 Memphis citizens [at least 2,000 in 1873; more than 5,200 in 1878; and 500 plus in 1879] and, by the late 1870s, resulted in closure of the town's businesses when more than half of the population left the city. At one point, Memphis was in debt Six Million Dollars. Due to this overwhelming economic burden, the City declared bankruptcy and its government was abandoned and Memphis lost its City Charter in 1879 becoming only a "taxing district of the state." Founder Dr. David T. Porter became the President of the "taxing district" of Shelby County which is the equivalent to the office of Mayor.

=== The Asylum Grows Again with the help of the Odd Fellows ===
During the terrible yellow fever epidemics of the 1870s, the Orphanage's attendants and children suffered heavily as did the rest of the city's population. Many Memphis children were orphaned by this epidemic and so great did the need increase in the years just after the plague, that the Independent Order of Odd Fellows expressed an interest in enlarging the facilities of the Leath Orphan Asylum. In 1875, the Odd Fellows of Memphis organized a national subscription of funds to erect a large and impressive three-story brick building. This structure, completed in April 1876, originally was called the Odd Fellow's Wing. Eventually, it became the Asylum's main building and is now used for general administration and visitor purposes and is one of several buildings on the Porter-Leath campus listed on the National Register of Historic Places.

== Start of the 20th century ==
At the start of the 20th century, the Children's Home, a small but similar institution on Alabama Street, was consolidated with the Orphanage and the institutions' new "merged" name became the Leath Orphan Asylum and Children's Home. Early in 1900, the institution was updated and equipped with electric lights and plumbing.

On March 16, 1900, the Leath Orphan Asylum and Children's Home for Orphan and Destitute Children published its Constitution and By-Laws, listing their Trustees (W.W. Schoolfield, James K. Porter, J. S. Dunscomb, Judge J. R. Flippin, W. J. Chase, P. McIntyre and P.R. Friedel), their Honorary Members, Officers and Board Managers, along with their former Presidents (Mrs. Marge Doyle, Mrs. Joseph Bruce, Mrs. Nina D. Martin, Mrs. A. F. Davis, Mrs. B. F. Haller, Mrs. Joseph Bruce, Mrs. Annie B. Stewart, and Mrs. L.E. Boswell). This publication also set forth the "Rules" of the institution and its visitation policy.

=== The Porter Home and Leath Orphanage ===
From the late 19th century, Dr. David T. Porter was a Trustee of the Orphanage and one of its most generous contributors. His brother and sister, James K. Porter and Mrs. Rebecca Porter Bartlett, were also active in the institution. When Mrs. Bartlett died in January 1903, she left a substantial bequest to the Orphanage. Her Will probated on January 22, 1903, set forth "… the remainder of my estate of every kind, character … I give, bequeath and devise to J.M. Dockeny, Elica H. Porter, John Quenton, John W. Dillard and Thos. B. Turley, as trustees – and to their successors in trust, … I direct that this fund shall be used … for the care and maintenance of orphans … whether orphaned by the death of one or both parents…." In 1904, in recognition of her generosity and the services of her late brother, the Home's name was changed to the Porter Home and Leath Orphan Asylum. Some years later, the name was shortened to the Porter Home and Leath Orphanage. In 1912 the northern and southern areas of Memphis, Western Tennessee, Eastern Arkansas, Southeastern Missouri and Northern Mississippi were all devastated by Mississippi River flooding and the resulting backup of rivers and bayou canals in all of these areas. This flood, like all later great Mississippi River floods, brought many destitute and homeless families and orphans to the high bluff areas of Memphis.

In 1919 the Porter Home and Leath Orphan Asylum published its Annual Report which included a "current" photograph of the main three-story building with its North Annex and a printed invitation stating "Visitors are welcome at the Home every Thursday afternoon."

=== The Orphanage Expands ===
The year 1923 witnessed another change for the institution. That same year, the Detention Ward, which operated as a small institutional hospital, was built. This one-story brick building adjoined the north side of the original building and served as a hospital for some twenty-three years before closing in 1946. It was reopened in 1953 as a dormitory, then closed again, and is now currently used as administrative offices for various PLCC programs.

=== Mr. Edwin Gould & the Building of Gould Cottage ===
In 1926, the Superintendent of the Orphanage was Miss Georgia Robinson, who at one time operated a summer camp for children in New York for railroad magnate Mr. Edwin Gould, son of the famous Jay Gould. While passing through Memphis that same year, Mr. Gould visited with "warm friend" Ms. Robinson and toured the institution and was impressed by its work. After showering the children with a taxi-load of toys, Gould decided to donate $50,000 to the Porter Home and Leath Orphanage. This generous gift made possible the establishment of a building for older girls. Gould Cottage, as it was named, was completed and dedicated in 1929 and fully and artfully described in newspaper articles and pictures published at its dedication. During his lifetime, Edwin Gould continued to send the Orphanage sums of money annually for the upkeep of the building and assisted in the improvement the institution's other property.

=== Help from the Exchange Club ===
In 1927, the Exchange Club of Memphis included the Porter Home and Leath Orphanage as one of its projects. The Exchange Club began to furnish the home with the services of a pediatrician, arranged for the children to receive proper dental care, supplied each child with monthly spending money, gave an annual summer Watermelon Party and an Easter Egg Hunt, and presented a gift to each child on his\her birthday, as well as provided the traditional tree and entertainment for the Christmas Eve Party. The old Minute Books and other records of the Orphanage reveal a "Spirit of Exchange" which was woven into the very fabric of the home's history.

=== The Formation of the Children's Bureau ===
Memphis, during the late 1920s, witnessed the formation of another social agency seeking to serve the needs of children. In 1926, the Community Chest (a predecessor of the United Way) helped organize the Children's Bureau which was formed to serve dependent, neglected and emotionally disturbed children who were not orphans but who needed temporary foster care. By the late 1920s, the combined efforts of the Porter Home and Leath Orphanage and the Children's Bureau would better meet the needs of children in Memphis and Shelby County.

=== The Great Depression ===
During the 1930s, the Great Depression took a heavy toll on local families and children. Due to the economic panic, home life for children was often anything but stable. Some mothers and fathers simply deserted their families rather than face the prospect of not being able to feed and clothe their children. Although federal money was appropriated for emergency assistance, none of it went to private agencies. Instead, any assistance had to come from private sector donations. The federal government provided milk and cod-liver oil for undernourished children in schools, but conditions in privately funded children's homes were in a social upheaval. Even though the Depression years were difficult financially for private organizations dedicated to helping children, institutions like the Porter Home and Leath Orphanage continued diligently in their efforts.

Another incident that caused the Home population to increase was the "great floods of 1937", which devastated a huge area surrounding Memphis, and thousands of homeless families were brought into Memphis.

As a matter of fact, struggles during the Depression and the great flood helped bring like-minded organizations closer together. For example, Mrs. E.G. Riddick, who was Director of the Children's Bureau in 1938, also served on the Board of the Porter Home and Leath Orphanage.

=== The 1940s and WW II ===
The decade of the 1940s witnessed new opportunities for the Orphanage to serve the needs of children. During World War II the institution made a wartime contribution by assuming the care of seventeen Memphis youngsters whose parents were unable to care for them because of war-related duties and obligations. The fathers of some of these children were serving in the armed forces while some of the mothers were employed as war plant workers.

=== The Porter-Leath Home: a vital member of the community ===
The 1950s brought another name change for the Orphanage – in 1951, the Charter of the Porter Home and Leath Orphanage was amended to change the name of the institution to the Porter-Leath Home.

At that time, the institution was in general disorder and disrepair and had experienced trouble finding a director and sufficient funding. In October 1951, Paul J. Sawrie and his wife agreed to run the Orphanage for thirty days until a permanent director could be found. They served in their "temporary" capacities for the next fifteen years. During that time, under the direction of Mr. and Mrs. Sawrie, the Home underwent a number of positive changes and improvements.

Also during this period of time the Orphanage children attended Memphis Public Schools with several of the PLH children attending Humes School two blocks south of the Orphanage on North Manassas and also referred to by many Memphians as "Elvis Presley's school". Several of the neighborhood children attending school with the PLH children came from impoverished homes. Quite often some of these children would come home with the PLH children after school. These guests were allowed to stay for supper, play in a peaceful and safe environment and often stayed over on weekends affording them access to an environment not enjoyed in their own homes.

=== The 1950s Bring Change to the Porter Leath Home ===
The early 1950s witnessed the organization of the Child Welfare Division under the Tennessee Department of Public Welfare. Conforming to the Department's Institutional Standards in 1952, the Porter-Leath Home made some physical changes. Under recommendation by the department, the institution's nursery was closed. As a result, the Home only cared for children of school age. The nursery, originally constructed to care for infants, began to accommodate children six and seven years of age.

Other important improvements made at the Porter-Leath Home included: the installation of additional lighting, new restrooms, and a new waste system. Also during this time period, the Exchange Club assisted the Home in providing a new library for the children.

In 1953, the Home began the successful operation of "cottage type" child care. The buildings were divided into six departments, each with twelve children, a housemother and complete living accommodations. Each unit had a television, study tables and comfortable, attractive furniture. According to the Home's director Paul Sawrie, the transition to the small-group method of child-care stressed individual attention. In evaluating this new type of child-care, the Tennessee Department of Public Welfare declared that Porter-Leath Home had "desirable standards" – a degree higher than "minimum standards." As a result of this proclamation, the Home no longer was required to undergo routine examinations under the new standard rules.

=== The Declining Need for Orphan Services ===
By the early 1960s, the Trustees of Porter-Leath Home recognized the declining need of services for orphans. Institutional care for orphans became rare largely due to the availability of Social Security benefits and Public Assistance Programs. Also, the numbers of true orphans diminished significantly as medical advances were made. Consequently, the Trustees sought to expand the Home's child-caring services to meet the ever-increasing demands for more specialized institutional programs. As a result, by 1961 children under care at Porter-Leath came from the Courts, the Children's Bureau and the Department of Public Welfare. For the most part, these children were dependent and neglected and from broken homes. The "cottage-type" or small-group system instituted by the Home in the 1950s was well suited to provide individual care and attention to children in such distress.

=== The First Group Home in Memphis ===
During the 1960s, the Children's Bureau, which had provided foster care for dependent and neglected children prior to the establishment of the State Child Welfare Division, also moved toward more specialized care. In 1962, the Bureau, which was now supported by tax funds, opened a group home for older boys. This was the first group home in the community and was provided through the help of the Optimist Group Foundation.

In the 1960s, both Porter-Leath Home and Children's Bureau were agencies supported by Shelby United Neighbors (S.U.N.). While the Children's Bureau placed children with foster families and provided casework for children in the home, Porter-Leath Home provided institutional care for children. In addition to receiving funding from S.U.N., Porter-Leath Home had an endowment fund. Interest from this fund, and a small amount of money collected from the families of the children, supplemented the funds allocated by S.U.N. Approximately one-third of the yearly budget set up for operational expenses came from the Home's own resources.

=== Porter-Leath Continues to Renovate ===
In the early 1960s, during the tenure of Mr. Paul Sawrie as Director, Porter-Leath Home again went through a long-term renovation and up-grade of their physical plant including: a remodeling of the inside of the old laundry building (which was situated east of the main building) into an up-to-date meeting hall for parents visiting children and the installation of a three-chair barbershop, a scout workroom, and modern restrooms for girls and boys. There was a black-topped parking area installed on the east side of the Annex Building as well as a smooth, black-topped basketball court. The athletic field was rearranged and re-graded with the assistance of the Public Works Department and the Memphis Park Commission. The playground equipment was rearranged and placed in a larger area of open ground and new swings were installed, also with the help of the Memphis Park Commission. During these improvements, the final appointments and decorations were furnished by the Exchange Club.

=== Porter-Leath & the Children's Bureau First Merger Attempt ===
As the needs in the community changed during the sixties, the Trustees of Porter-Leath Home and the Board of Children's Bureau began to look at other/better ways of serving children in need. For example, the Home's Director Paul Sawrie expressed concern that Porter-Leath needed a casework service to supplement its small-group system of child-care. In October 1960, a cooperative organizational plan was proposed between the two agencies. By 1961, the Consolidation Project, a promotion of S.U.N., outlined a merger between Porter-Leath and the Children's Bureau.

As a result, a Porter-Leath-Children's Bureau Consolidation Committee was formed. Meetings and discussions in regard to consolidation lasted for almost a year, until Porter-Leath's Board of Trustees finally withdrew from the idea. This action on the part of the Trustees was followed in the succeeding months by criticisms and pressures which finally resulted in Porter-Leath Home and Children's Bureau being brought together under a trial period of actual work in the Home which continued for some nine months. This working arrangement, however, did not coordinate with Porter-Leath's established routine and was discontinued in June 1963. For the next few years, Porter-Leath Home did not become affiliated with the Children's Bureau. Although the Home's Director, its Boards of Trustees and managers realized the necessity to modernize its child-care efforts, they wanted to do so with minimal changes to Porter-Leath's traditional customs.

=== The Birth of Porter-Leath Children's Center ===
By 1965, an evaluation of the Porter-Leath Home by the Department of Public Welfare strongly recommended the institution update its services from just providing custodial care to a multiple-program format for children. According to the evaluation, other programs, such as Aid to Families with Dependent Children (AFDC), veteran's benefits, foster homes and Social Security benefits, had limited the need for institutions serving dependent and neglected children. The Department determined, with professional casework and the utilization of other programs for children and families, many children could remain in their own homes. This service could best be accomplished by professional caseworkers working together with children, their parents and other community resources.

Apparently, the State's recommendations, the changing climate of child-care and the home's difficulty conforming to Federal Standards for a modern child-care agency convinced the administrators of Porter-Leath Home to reconsider the cooperative affiliation with Children's Bureau. This endeavor resulted in the Porter-Leath Home consolidating its services with the Children's Bureau effective November 20, 1969. When these two agencies merged, their combined efforts became known as the Porter-Leath Children's Center. The goal of this merger was to provide comprehensive child welfare services for children and their families.

== Mid 20th Century ==
=== 1969–1997 ===
Since 1969, Porter-Leath has changed the focus of its services and developed new programs to meet the ever-changing needs of children and families in the Memphis community. Beginning in 1971, Porter-Leath began to operate and supervise a series of family day homes (day care in a person's home) that cared for the children of working parents in a family setting in their home neighborhoods. Through this program, nutritious hot meals are served to children at the homes and social services are provided by trained social workers to the families.

=== Porter-Leath Recognized by Shelby County Historical Commission ===
On December 11, 1985, Porter-Leath's buildings were officially noted as historical properties and a marker was placed in front of the main campus building and dedicated by the Shelby County Historical Commission. The marker reads: PORTER-LEATH CHILDREN'S CENTER An orphan asylum founded by Sara Leath was chartered in 1850 and moved to this site in 1856. After surviving the hardships of the Civil War years, the orphanage endured the scourge of the 1870s yellow fever epidemics. Since many children were orphaned during this period, additional capacity was needed. Responding to this crisis, in 1875 the Independent Order of Odd Fellows provided funds to erect another building. In 1904 the name Porter was added in recognition of the generosity of the Porter family. Porter-Leath continued to be an orphanage until 1969 when it became a multi-service agency to serve more children in need.

=== Northside High School Infant Care Center ===
In 1987, Porter-Leath, in collaboration with the Memphis/Shelby County Health Department, received a five-year grant from the Robert Wood Johnson Foundation to begin on-site services at Northside High School. The Health Department opened a school-based health clinic and Porter-Leath opened an on-site infant care center. The center offered childcare for Northside students enabling teen parents to continue their educations. The center also offered individual and group parenting classes. Students were required to volunteer a minimum of one hour per week and to pick their children up after school unless participating in a school-sanctioned event.

Once established, it was expected that the infant care center would be sustained with state funding. State Title XX funds were allocated to the Northside Infant Care Center until 1997, when the State began the current voucher system which allows parents to choose any child care center. Given the choice of Northside Infant Care, where the teen's participation was required and other centers with no such requirement or regulations, many teens began to choose alternative childcare locations. As enrollment dropped, the Northside Infant Care Center became fiscally unviable and closed its doors at the end of the 1997 school year.

=== Programs for Teens in State Custody ===
Due to the increase in the number of children leaving state custody without the skills needed to become self-sufficient, the State of Tennessee implemented specialized services to provide job training and independent life skills for youth in custody. The Employment Training for Teens Program at PLCC began in 1987 as the Tutor-Mentor Program. The program began with only twelve youth and evolved over the years to serve over fifty youth per year with more than twenty work sites throughout the City of Memphis at its peak.

In addition to the services provided by Porter-Leath's Employment Training Program, in 1996 the After Care Project was implemented to assist youth who have been emancipated from custody. These services were provided to prevent future unemployment, transient street lifestyles and homelessness. The support provided through Employment Training for Teens and the After Care Project gave youth the tools needed to become self-sufficient, productive and independent. Due to funding cuts within the State of Tennessee, this successful program was closed in 2003.

PL's Independent Living Program began in 1987 within a residential home on Cooper Street. The program placed young men (ages 16–20) who lacked a proper adult role model, in group homes where house parents would teach them self-sufficiency and living skills focused on ensuring their ability to function successfully upon release from foster care at the age of majority. In late May 2000, the Independent Living program moved into a totally renovated and updated large four-square brick home on the southwest corner of North Parkway and Dunlap. Not only did PL restore the usefulness of this structure and aid in the renewal of this area of the community, but also gave the young men at Independent Living a much larger, totally updated and healthy environment for growth. Unfortunately, funding for independent living programs were discontinued at the state level and this facility was closed in 2004.

=== HIPPY and MIHOW ===
In approximately 1990, the National Council of Jewish Women began exploring the idea of bringing the Home Instruction Program for Preschool Youngsters (HIPPY) to Memphis. PL was approached to implement the program and the search began for funding.

In 1995 PL received an AmeriCorps grant to begin the HIPPY program, with matching funds from Goals 2000. HIPPY is a home-based literacy program delivered by AmeriCorps paraprofessionals designed to help parents become their child's first teacher.

In recognition of the need for earlier and more comprehensive intervention with families, the program began using the Maternal/Infant Health Outreach Worker Project (MIHOW) curriculum in 1998 thus expanding services to include pregnant women and families with children birth to five years of age. Due to this expanded focus, the name of the program was changed to Early Intervention in 1999.

=== Sarah's Place ===
In November 1993, as a result of a large fundraising campaign with the special efforts of Nancy Chase, PaLs, the Trustees, the board of directors and staff a new, state-of-the-art shelter facility, named Sarah's Place (in honor of Sarah Leath) was opened to provide emergency care for neglected or abused children. Sarah's Place is open 24 hours a day, 7 days a week. Trained child-care workers, supervised by a professional social worker, provide a safe, secure environment for children in distress until permanent plans can be made for the child.

== 2000 & Beyond ==
=== Early Head Start Services Begin ===
In 1998, PL received a five-year grant from the U.S. Department of Health and Human Services in September 1998 to begin an Early Head Start Program serving sixty children aged six-weeks to three years of age, along with a home-based component for pregnant mothers. This program was the first of its kind in Shelby County. The initial program year was spent on program planning and development. Early Head Start, originally known as Bright Start, began delivery of home-based services to families in September 1999.

In May 2000, the Early Head Start Center was completed on the north end of the PL campus. In June 2000 Early Head Start began offering a combination of home-based and center-based Early Head Start services. In March 2001, PL received an expansion grant for Early Head Start to increase its number of children in the program to 95 and entered into a contract with Metropolitan Inter Faith Association (MIFA) to operate an Early Head Start center for 27 children at its Les Passees Center. In September 2005, MIFA requested and PL agreed to take over operations of its Early Head Start program. In June 2006, the Early Head Start Center received accreditation for the National Association for the Education of Young Children (NAEYC). NAEYC accreditation is the highest level of accreditation that a child care program can attain.

=== Additional Renovations are Made at Porter-Leath ===
1998 brought renewed focus on the long-neglected physical plant of the PL main campus. In March 1998, a successful fundraising campaign, including a $50,000 grant from the State of Tennessee, led to new roofs being installed on many buildings. In May 1998, the Agency welcomed NationsBank volunteers who cleaned, repaired and installed iron fencing and massive landscaping improvements with a value of $120,000. As a result of this and other on-going campus improvements, the Agency participated in the Memphis City Beautiful Program for 1998–99. New lighting was installed and a tree trimming/maintenance program began in 1998. The deteriorated Gould Cottage was completely rehabilitated and reopened as the Adoption Resources Cottage in 2001. In 2002 the long-dormant and uninhabitable South Annex building was renovated using a Housing and Community Development Grant and brought a new walking track to the campus. A gazebo and walking paths were added in 2003.

=== Head Start Services Begin ===
In October 2001, PL opened its first Head Start center at 1600 Ash Street in the Douglass neighborhood. This 16,500-square-foot (1,530 m^{2}) facility serves 160 children aged three to five. Douglass Head Start was built by Shelby County Government and is leased by Porter-Leath for $1 per year. Douglass Head Start earned accredited by the National Association for the Education of Young Children (NAEYC) in June 2006. A donation from a local web developing team led to the Agency's first ever website in June 2001.

American Way Head Start opened as PL's second Head Start center and began serving 238 children aged three to five in November 2002. This 22,000-square-foot (2,000 m^{2}) facility located at 4207 American Way was completely renovated under the Agency's direction. Fund raising provided all of the furniture, fixtures and equipment for the modern center. The program serves 238 children during the Head Start school year and 100 of those children year-round. American Way Head Start earned accreditation by NAEYC in June 2006.

=== Porter-Leath Plans for the Future ===
The Porter-Leath Early Childhood Foundation (PLECF) was created in October 2004 with a $1,000,000 donation from the Porter-Leath Home. Housed at the Community Foundation of Greater Memphis, the PLECF was developed to create a better tool for raising funds to sustain the Agency.

January 2005 brought about strategic changes to the executive staff and board of directors. Both were transformed into a more corporate style to enhance the long-term capacity of the Agency.
