= Deaths in October 2016 =

The following is a list of notable deaths in October 2016.

Entries for each day are listed alphabetically by surname. A typical entry lists information in the following sequence:

- Name, age, country of citizenship and reason for notability, established cause of death, reference.

== October 2016 ==
=== 1 ===
- Edda Heiðrún Backman, 58, Icelandic actress (101 Reykjavík), motor neurone disease.
- Brian Bell, 86, New Zealand ornithologist.
- Johney Brooks, 83, American educator.
- Bobby Burnett, 73, American football player (Buffalo Bills), pancreatic cancer.
- Aladár Dobsa, 84, Hungarian Olympic sports shooter.
- William Dumbrell, 90, Australian biblical scholar.
- David Herd, 82, Scottish footballer (Arsenal, Manchester United, national team).
- Anton Jeyanathan, 68, Sri Lankan politician, traffic collision.
- Jagoda Kaloper, 69, Croatian actress (W.R.: Mysteries of the Organism).
- Erol Keskin, 89, Turkish footballer (Fenerbahçe, Adaletspor, national team).
- Niki Massey, 35, American atheist blogger.
- Daphne Odjig, 97, Canadian First Nations artist.
- Vittorio Scantamburlo, 86, Italian football manager and scout.
- Roger Theder, 77, American football player and coach, Parkinson's disease.
- Lowell Thomas Jr., 92, English-born American film producer and politician, member of the Alaska Senate (1967–1974), Lieutenant Governor of Alaska (1974–1978).
- Toni Williams, 77, Cook Islands-born New Zealand singer.

=== 2 ===
- David Abdulai, 65, Ghanaian physician.
- Georg Apenes, 76, Norwegian politician and jurist.
- Walter Darby Bannard, 82, American painter.
- Betty Blayton, 79, American artist, arts administrator, and co-founder of the Studio Museum in Harlem.
- Steve Byrd, 61, English guitarist (Gillan, Kim Wilde), heart attack.
- Gordon Davidson, 83, American stage and film director.
- Pierre Durand, 84, French Olympic equestrian.
- Inez Fischer-Credo, 88, Canadian Olympic equestrian.
- Mary Hesse, 91, British academician and educator.
- Ed McHugh, 86, American Olympic soccer player.
- Sir Neville Marriner, 92, British conductor (Amadeus), founder of the Academy of St Martin in the Fields.
- Bobby Molloy, 80, Irish politician, TD (1965–2002).
- Jeroen Oerlemans, 46, Dutch photojournalist, shot.
- Gary Reed, 60, American comic book writer (Deadworld, Baker Street), heart attack.
- Thomas Round, 100, British opera singer.
- Hanna Zora, 77, Iraqi-born Iranian-Canadian Chaldean Catholic hierarch, Archbishop of Ahwaz (1974–2011) and Mar Addai of Toronto (2011–2014).

=== 3 ===
- Cai Qirui, 102, Chinese chemist, educator and academician (Chinese Academy of Sciences).
- Alain Chevallier, 68, French motorcycle designer, cancer.
- Ljupka Dimitrovska, 70, Macedonian-born Croatian singer.
- David Donald, 83, New Zealand cricketer (Northern Districts).
- Isobel Finnerty, 86, Canadian politician, Senator (1999–2005).
- José González, 91, Puerto Rican sport shooter.
- Anthony Goodman, 80, British medieval historian.
- K. David Van Hoesen, 90, American bassoonist.
- Jan Kozák, 87, Czech Olympic basketball player.
- Ahmad Salama Mabruk, 59, Egyptian leader of Jabhat al-Nusra, drone strike.
- Andrew Vicari, 84, British painter.
- Mário Wilson, 86, Portuguese football player and manager (Sporting, Académica, Benfica).

=== 4 ===
- Gair Allie, 84, American baseball player (Pittsburgh Pirates), heart disease.
- Mario Almada, 94, Mexican actor (La Viuda Negra).
- Kenneth Angell, 86, American Roman Catholic prelate, Bishop of Burlington (1992–2005).
- Yusuf Arakkal, 70, Indian painter.
- Bertrand M. Bell, 86, American physician, key figure in the Libby Zion Law legislation, kidney failure.
- Terry Butler, 58, Australian rugby league player, lung cancer.
- Elaine Lustig Cohen, 89, American graphic designer.
- Caroline Crawley, 53, British singer and musician (Shelleyan Orphan, This Mortal Coil).
- Stephen de Mowbray, 91, British counterintelligence officer.
- Burt Freeman, 92, American physicist.
- Melvin M. Grumbach, 90, American pediatrician.
- Brigitte Hamann, 76, German-Austrian historian and author.
- Pieter Hintjens, 53, Belgian software developer, euthanasia.
- Merfyn Jones, 85, Welsh footballer (Scunthorpe United, Crewe Alexandra, Chester City).
- Hso Khan Pha, 78, Burmese-born Canadian geologist and exiled prince of Yawnghwe.
- Ivan C. Lafayette, 86, American soldier, civic activist and politician.
- Fred Osam-Duodu, 78, Ghanaian football manager.
- Jim Parrott, 74, Canadian politician, MLA for Fundy-River Valley (2010–2014).
- Doug Slaten, 36, American baseball player (Arizona Diamondbacks, Washington Nationals, Pittsburgh Pirates).
- Bing Thom, 75, Hong Kong-born Canadian architect, brain aneurysm.
- Harsh Vardhan, 68, Indian politician.
- Donald H. White, 95, American composer.

=== 5 ===
- Girma Asmerom, 66, Eritrean politician.
- Georges Balandier, 95, French sociologist, anthropologist and ethnologist.
- Jarlath Carey, 74, Irish Gaelic football player.
- Ernst Chervet, 76, Swiss Olympic boxer.
- Pompeiu Hărășteanu, 81, Romanian opera singer.
- Dick Haugland, 73, American biochemist, brain cancer.
- Austin Kalish, 95, American television writer (Family Affair, My Three Sons, Good Times).
- Michal Kováč, 86, Slovak politician, President (1993–1998), complications of Parkinson's disease.
- György Márkus, 82, Hungarian philosopher.
- Luisa Massimo, 87, Italian pediatrician.
- Herb McMath, 62, American football player (Oakland Raiders, Green Bay Packers).
- Yasmin Modassir, Indian zoologist.
- Conxita Mora Jordana, 61, Andorran politician and businesswoman, Mayor of Andorra la Vella (1999-2003) and MP (2009-2011).
- Cameron Moore, 25, American basketball player (Reyer Venezia Mestre).
- Arthur Z'ahidi Ngoma, 69, Congolese politician, vice-president of the transitional government (2003–2007).
- Donald M. Phillips, 87, Canadian politician, MLA for South Peace River.
- Josh Samman, 28, American mixed martial artist (UFC).
- Michiyo Yasuda, 77, Japanese animator (Spirited Away, Grave of the Fireflies, Princess Mononoke).
- Brock Yates, 82, American automotive journalist (Car and Driver) and screenwriter (Smokey and the Bandit II, The Cannonball Run), Alzheimer's disease.

=== 6 ===
- Hans W. Becherer, 81, American businessman, president of John Deere (1987).
- James Colaianni, 94, American lay theologian.
- Peter Denton, 70, English footballer (Coventry, Luton).
- Per Axel Eriksson, 91, Swedish Olympic decathlete.
- Walter Greiner, 80, German theoretical physicist.
- Hidipo Hamutenya, 77, Namibian politician, Foreign Minister (2002–2004).
- Alan Hodgson, 64, English cricketer (Northamptonshire).
- Heisnam Kanhailal, 75, Indian art theatre personality.
- Eva Lokko, Ghanaian engineer and politician.
- Tony Mottram, 96, British tennis player.
- Barbara Oliver Hagerman, 73, Canadian music teacher and public servant, Lieutenant Governor of Prince Edward Island (2006–2011), cancer.
- George Pernicano, 98, American businessman, co-owner of the San Diego Chargers.
- Marina Sanaya, 57, Russian Olympic figure skater (1972).
- Fred Slaughter, 74, American college basketball player (UCLA).
- Nello Sforacchi, 94, Italian cyclist.
- Mike Tomkies, 88, British nature writer.
- Ken Wilburn, 72, American basketball player (Chicago Bulls).

=== 7 ===
- Abdul-Rab al-Shadadi, 52-53, Yemeni Army major general, missile strike.
- John Gleeson, 78, Australian Test cricketer.
- Ross Higgins, 85, Australian actor (Kingswood Country, Bullpitt!).
- Lyudmila Ivanova, 83, Russian actress (Office Romance).
- Barbara Kisseler, 67, German culture manager and politician.
- Kathleen Miller, 71, American actress (Sirota's Court, Coming Home, Shampoo).
- Frederick C. Neidhardt, 85, American microbiologist.
- Anne Pashley, 80, British athlete and opera singer, Olympic silver medalist (1956).
- Gonzalo Peralta, 36, Argentine footballer (Almirante Brown, Platense), cancer.
- Martha Roth, 84, Italian-born Mexican actress (A Family Like Many Others).
- Wolfgang Suschitzky, 104, Austro-Hungarian-born British photographer and cinematographer (Get Carter).
- Alistair Urquhart, 97, Scottish author and soldier (Gordon Highlanders).
- Bill Warren, 73, American film historian and critic.
- Rebecca Wilson, 54, Australian sports journalist, breast cancer.

=== 8 ===
- Peter Allen, 96, American radio broadcaster, host of Metropolitan Opera radio broadcasts (1975–2004).
- Helmut Anschütz, 84, German Olympic fencer (1960).
- Guillaume Bieganski, 83, French footballer (Lens).
- Stephen Bollenbach, 74, American businessman, CEO of Hilton (1996–2007).
- Alan Bray, 87, British Olympic sport shooter.
- Lyn Chevli, 84, American underground comics artist (Tits & Clits Comix).
- Don Ciccone, 70, American singer-songwriter and musician (The Critters, The Four Seasons, Tommy James and the Shondells).
- Ray William Clough, 96, American engineer.
- Gary Dubin, 57, American actor (The Partridge Family, The Aristocats, Jaws 2), bone cancer.
- Maximiliano Giusti, 25, Argentine footballer, traffic collision.
- Alina María Hernández, 46, Cuban-American transsexual actress.
- Mayer Hersh, 90, Polish survivor of Auschwitz.
- Bruce Hudson, 87, Canadian curler.
- Dickie Jeeps, 84, English rugby union player (Northampton Saints) and administrator (Sports Council).
- Klaus Kertess, 76, American curator, art gallerist and writer, complications from Alzheimer's.
- Kuo Chin-fa, 72, Taiwanese Hokkien pop singer, cardiorespiratory failure.
- Wojciech Kurpiewski, 50, Polish sprint canoer, Olympic silver medalist (1992).
- Luc Mbassi, 58/59, Cameroonian Olympic footballer (1984).
- Michael Horace Miller, 88, British Royal Air Force officer.
- Jacob Neusner, 84, American academician and Judaica scholar.
- Stylianos Pattakos, 103, Greek military officer and coup leader, Deputy Prime Minister (1967–1973).
- Giovanni Scognamillo, 87, Turkish film critic.
- Pierre Tchernia, 88, French screenwriter and voice actor (Asterix).
- Anton Winkler, 62, German luger, Olympic bronze medalist (1980).

=== 9 ===
- Susan Aceron, 44, Canadian actress, voice actress and businesswoman (Sailor Moon, Beyblade, The In-Laws), nasopharynx cancer.
- René Avilés Fabila, 75, Mexican author, heart attack.
- Worth H. Bagley, 92, American admiral.
- Bored Nothing, 26, Australian musician, suicide.
- Mamadou Dembelé, 82, Malian physician and politician, Prime Minister (1986–1988).
- Santo DiPietro, 81, American businessman and politician, member of the Maine House of Representatives (1989–1996) and mayor of South Portland, Maine (1986–1987).
- Francis Duteil, 69, French Olympic cyclist.
- Donn Fendler, 90, American wilderness survivor.
- Michael Firth, 67, New Zealand film director (Off the Edge).
- Sir Anthony Grant, 91, British politician, MP (1964–1997).
- Aman Ullah Karim, 84–85, Malaysian Olympic field hockey player.
- David Konstant, 86, English Roman Catholic prelate, Bishop of Leeds (1985–2004).
- El Mongol, 86, Mexican professional wrestler (GCW).
- Zara Nutley, 90, New Zealand-born British actress.
- Aaron Pryor, 60, American light-welterweight boxer, WBA/IBF world champion (1980–1985), heart disease.
- Bilge Tarhan, 75, Turkish Olympic footballer.
- Kenneth P. Thompson, 50, American lawyer, Kings County District Attorney (since 2014), cancer.
- Andrzej Wajda, 90, Polish film director (Ashes and Diamonds, Man of Iron, Katyń), pulmonary failure.

=== 10 ===
- Tony Adamowicz, 75, American racing driver (IMSA GT, Trans Am Series), brain cancer.
- Issa Bagayogo, 54, Malian musician.
- Leo Beranek, 102, American acoustics expert (BBN Technologies).
- Lilián Buglia, 82, Argentine Olympic sprinter.
- Christian Erlandsen, 90, Norwegian politician, MP (1977–1985).
- Lorenzo Freeman, 52, American football player (Pittsburgh Steelers, New York Giants).
- Parmeshwar Godrej, 70, Indian socialite, businesswoman, and AIDS activist.
- Gerry Gow, 64, Scottish footballer (Bristol City, Manchester City, Rotherham), cancer.
- Graham C. Greene, 80, British publisher (Jonathan Cape).
- Tamme Hanken, 56, German television personality (Der XXL-Ostfriese).
- Marnix Kappers, 73, Dutch actor, suicide.
- Hans Petter Langtangen, 54, Norwegian computer scientist.
- Drew Nelson, 60, Northern Irish solicitor, politician, and Grand Secretary of the Grand Orange Lodge of Ireland.
- Eddie O'Hara, 80, Scottish footballer (Falkirk, Everton, Barnsley).
- Maulwi Saelan, 88, Indonesian Olympic footballer (1956).
- Ram Ekbal Singh Warsi, 94, Indian politician, MLA (1969–1972).
- Gordon Stewart, 97, Scottish epidemiologist.
- Kazunari Tanaka, 49, Japanese voice actor (Gundam, Planetes, InuYasha), intracerebral hemorrhage.
- John Vaughn, 88, American religious leader, Minister General of the Order of Friars Minor (1979–1991).
- Gonzalo Vega, 69, Mexican actor (Life Is Most Important, The Place Without Limits).

=== 11 ===
- David Antin, 84, American poet and performance artist.
- Tom Barnes, 70, American journalist (Pittsburgh Post-Gazette).
- Patricia Barry, 93, American actress (All My Children, The Guiding Light, Days of Our Lives).
- Ricky Callan, 54, Scottish actor.
- Emerson Stephen Colaw, 94, American theologian and prelate, Bishop of the United Methodist Church.
- Noel Fincher, 72, Australian rules footballer (Footscray, North Melbourne).
- Richard Fry, 92, British WWII army officer.
- Matti Hagman, 61, Finnish ice hockey player (Boston Bruins, Edmonton Oilers, HIFK).
- Pia Hallström, 55, Swedish politician, MP for Värmland (since 2010), breast cancer.
- Lars Huldén, 90, Finnish writer and translator.
- Dick Israel, 68, Filipino actor, complications from a stroke.
- Vladimir Lanyugin, 67, Russian Olympic equestrian.
- Steve Lemmens, 44, Belgian snooker player, suicide by train.
- Antero Lumme, 82, Finnish racing cyclist.
- Marju, 28, Irish Thoroughbred racehorse. (death announced on this date)
- Jan Matocha, 93, Czechoslovak Olympic sprint canoer (1948, 1952).
- Peter Reynolds, 58, Welsh composer.
- Don Ringe, 70, American journalist and documentary filmmaker.
- Pero Simić, 70, Bosnian Serb journalist and historian.
- Teatao Teannaki, 80, I-Kiribati politician, Vice-President (1979–1991) and President (1991–1994), heart attack.
- Gurcharan Virk, 48, Indian Punjabi writer, director, lyricist and producer, heart attack.
- Ewen Whitaker, 94, British astronomer.
- Milton Zaitlin, 89, American virologist.

=== 12 ===
- Reinhart Ahlrichs, 76, German theoretical chemist.
- Des Ball, 69, Australian security and defence expert, cancer.
- Shahlyla Baloch, 20, Pakistani footballer (national team), traffic collision.
- Robert Bateman, 80, American songwriter and record producer ("Please Mr. Postman"), heart attack.
- Beata Bergström, 95, Swedish photographer.
- Stan Deno, 80, American educational psychologist.
- Pietro Diana, 84, Italian artist.
- Frank Fischl, 89, American air force pilot and politician, Mayor of Allentown, Pennsylvania (1978–1982).
- Thomas Mikal Ford, 52, American actor (Martin, Harlem Nights, Across the Tracks) and comedian, stomach aneurysm.
- Jack Greenberg, 91, American lawyer and civil rights activist.
- Rick Gudex, 48, American politician, member of the Wisconsin Senate (since 2013), suicide by gunshot.
- Leo Harrison, 94, English cricketer (Hampshire).
- Ma Jiangbao, 74, Chinese martial arts teacher.
- Renato Ongari, 81, Italian Olympic sprint canoeist (1960).
- Bryan Pearson, 82, British-born Canadian politician.
- Dylan Rieder, 28, American skateboarder and model, leukemia.
- Sonny Sanders, 77, American songwriter, arranger and record producer.
- Kemal Unakıtan, 70, Turkish politician, Minister of Finance (2002–2009).
- John Vulich, 55, American makeup artist (Buffy the Vampire Slayer, Babylon 5, The X-Files), heart attack.
- Fulton Walker, 58, American football player (Miami Dolphins, Los Angeles Raiders).
- Gerhard Wimberger, 93, Austrian composer.

=== 13 ===
- Bhumibol Adulyadej, 88, Thai monarch, King (since 1946)
- Lloyd Bitzer, 85, American rhetorician.
- William Gilbert Chaloner, 87, British palaeobotanist.
- Delia Davin, 72, English pioneer of Chinese women's studies, cancer.
- Curt Engelhorn, 90, German billionaire businessman.
- Dario Fo, 90, Italian playwright, Nobel Literature Prize laureate (1997).
- Robert Haszeldine, 91, British chemist.
- Andrzej Kopiczyński, 82, Polish actor (Czterdziestolatek).
- Richard A. Pittman, 71, American marine, recipient of the Medal of Honor.
- Booneua Prasertsuwan, 97, Thai politician, Speaker of the House of Representatives (1995–1996).
- Jim Prentice, 60, Canadian politician, Premier of Alberta (2014–2015), MP for Calgary Centre-North (2004–2010), plane crash.
- Primo Sentimenti, 89, Italian footballer (Lazio, Parma).
- Louis Stettner, 93, American photographer.
- Tonino Valerii, 82, Italian film director (My Name Is Nobody, A Girl Called Jules, Sahara Cross).

=== 14 ===
- Jean Alexander, 90, English actress (Coronation Street, Last of the Summer Wine, Scandal).
- Cirilo Almario, 85, Filipino Roman Catholic prelate, Bishop of Malolos (1977–1996).
- Lucy Baxley, 78, American politician, Lieutenant Governor of Alabama (2003–2007).
- Klim Churyumov, 79, Soviet and Ukrainian astronomer, co-discoverer of the comet 67P/Churyumov–Gerasimenko.
- Brajbir Saran Das, 90, Indian politician, Chief administrative officer of Sikkim (1973-1974).
- Kathryn Adams Doty, 96, American actress (Saboteur).
- Pierre Étaix, 87, French clown, comedian and film director (Heureux Anniversaire, Yo Yo, Le Grand Amour), Oscar winner (1963), complications from intestinal infection.
- Ed Gorman, 74, American writer, multiple myeloma.
- Kamal Habibollahi, 86, Iranian politician and admiral.
- Avis Higgs, 98, New Zealand artist.
- Thom Jones, 71, American writer.
- Helen Kelly, 52, New Zealand trade unionist, lung cancer.
- Brigit Pegeen Kelly, 65, American poet.
- Werner Lämmerhirt, 67, German singer-songwriter and guitarist.
- John Mone, 87, Scottish Roman Catholic prelate, Bishop of Paisley (1988–2004).
- Farouk Shousha, 80, Egyptian poet.
- Song Yeong, 76, South Korean writer.
- Aleksandr Syomin, 73, Soviet Azerbaijani footballer (Neftçi).
- Benjamin Weir, 92, American missionary.

=== 15 ===
- Doug Anderson, 89, New Zealand rugby league player (Auckland, national team).
- Marcel Berger, 89, French mathematician.
- Hans Bruggeman, 89, Dutch activist and politician, member of the House of Representatives (1963–1967).
- Dennis Byrd, 50, American football player (New York Jets), traffic collision.
- Stephen Clark, 55, British playwright.
- Colin George, 87, Welsh actor (Coronation Street) and director.
- Quentin Groves, 32, American football player (Jacksonville Jaguars, Oakland Raiders, Cleveland Browns), heart attack.
- Teodor Laço, 80, Albanian politician, diplomat and author.
- Richard R. Lemke, 86, American politician.
- Jossy Mansur, 82, Aruban editor.
- Bruce Marshall, 54, American ice hockey coach (Connecticut Huskies, Franklin Pierce Ravens).
- Octagonal, 24, New Zealand-bred Australian Thoroughbred racehorse, euthanized.
- Frank Peers, 98, Canadian broadcaster and political scientist. (death announced on this date)
- Yangthang Rinpoche, 86, Indian Buddhist teacher.
- Barbara Romack, 83, American golfer.
- John Spanswick, 83, English cricketer (Kent).
- Haruo Tomiyama, 81, Japanese photographer.
- Per Rune Wølner, 67, Norwegian footballer (Strømsgodset), cancer.

=== 16 ===
- Mickey Byrne, 93, Irish hurler (Tipperary).
- Maggie Diaz, 91, American-born Australian photographer.
- Anthony Foley, 42, Irish rugby union player and coach (Munster), acute pulmonary oedema.
- Tony Golab, 97, Canadian football player (Ottawa Rough Riders).
- Calvin Gotlieb, 95, Canadian professor and computer scientist.
- Cecilia Hart, 68, American television and stage actress (Paris), ovarian cancer.
- Clyde C. Holloway, 72, American politician.
- Valerie Hunter Gordon, 94, British inventor of disposable nappies.
- Jia Jia, 38, Chinese giant panda, euthanized.
- Kigeli V, 80, Rwandan monarch, King (1959–1961).
- Ted V. Mikels, 87, American filmmaker (Girl in Gold Boots, The Astro-Zombies, The Doll Squad), colon cancer.
- Stephen Moorbath, 87, German-born British geologist.
- John Paterakis, 87, American businessman.
- Arsen Pavlov, 33, Russian military officer, participant in the War in Donbas, IED explosion.
- George Peebles, 80, Scottish footballer (Dunfermline, Stirling Albion).
- Lucia Perillo, 58, American poet and novelist.
- Juras Požela, 34, Lithuanian politician, Minister of Health (since March 2016), pancreatitis.
- Juan Radrigán, 79, Chilean writer, cancer.
- Molly Rose, 95, British World War II aviator.
- Alfred P. Smyth, 74, Irish historian.
- Joseph A. Suozzi, 95, Italian-born American judge and politician.
- Geoffrey Yeh, 85, Hong Kong businessman.
- Viktor Zubkov, 79, Russian basketball player, Olympic silver medalist (1956, 1960).

=== 17 ===
- Noriko Akatsuka, 79, Japanese-born American linguist.
- Rufin Anthony, 76, Pakistani Roman Catholic prelate, Bishop of Islamabad-Rawalpindi (since 2010).
- Eddie Applegate, 81, American actor (The Patty Duke Show, Easy A, A Ticklish Affair).
- Sandra Bartky, 81, American feminist philosopher.
- Vincenzino Culicchia, 84, Italian politician.
- James H. DeCoursey Jr., 84, American politician.
- Laurie Dwyer, 77, Australian football player (North Melbourne).
- Ralph Jespersen, 91, Canadian politician.
- Teodor Kufel, 96, Polish general.
- Rolf Lamers, 89, German Olympic athlete.
- Boris Loginow, 81, Venezuelan Olympic sport shooter.
- Cephas Msipa, 85, Zimbabwean politician.
- Edgar Munhall, 83, American art historian, pancreatic and lung cancer.
- Elena Santonja, 84, Spanish television presenter.
- Irwin Smigel, 92, American dentist, pneumonia.
- Charles J. Stewart, 93, American actor.
- Morris Stroud, 70, American football player (Kansas City Chiefs), Super Bowl winner (1970).
- Rémy Vogel, 55, French footballer (Strasbourg).

=== 18 ===
- Anthony Addabbo, 56, American actor (Guiding Light, Generations, The Bold & the Beautiful).
- David Bunnell, 69, American businessman, writer and publisher (PC Magazine).
- Phil Chess, 95, Polish-born American record producer and company executive (Chess Records).
- Dave Colclough, 52, Welsh professional poker player, cancer.
- Alan Collins, 88, English sculptor.
- Anne Crookshank, 89, Irish art historian.
- Mike Daniels, 88, British jazz trumpeter and bandleader.
- Marianne de Trey, 102, British potter.
- Bobby Ellis, 84, Jamaican trumpeter, pneumonia-related illness.
- Francis Flood, 86, Irish racehorse trainer.
- Huw Jones, 82, Welsh Anglican bishop.
- Sergei Likhachev, 76, Azeri-born Russian tennis player and coach.
- William McKelvey, 82, British politician, MP for Kilmarnock and Loudoun (1983–1997).
- Fred Roots, 93, Canadian geologist.
- Richard K. Saxer, 88, American lieutenant general.
- Gary Sprake, 71, Welsh footballer (Leeds United, national team).
- Sir Sigmund Sternberg, 95, Hungarian-born British philanthropist, businessman and Labour Party donor.
- Turki bin Saud Al Kabeer, 24-25, Saudi prince and convicted murderer, executed by beheading.
- Ken Wiwa, 47, Nigerian journalist and author, stroke.

=== 19 ===
- Tommy Bartlett, 88, American tennis and basketball coach.
- Safet Berisha, 66, Albanian footballer (Partizani Tirana).
- Mark Birch, 67, British jockey.
- Radu Câmpeanu, 94, Romanian politician, Senator (1990–1992, 2004–2008).
- Milka Canić, 72, Serbian television presenter and academic.
- Yvette Chauviré, 99, French prima ballerina.
- Luis María Echeberría, 76, Spanish footballer (Athletic Bilbao, national team).
- William Keith Emerson, 91, American malacologist.
- Joe Kirrene, 85, American baseball player (Chicago White Sox).
- Fergus O'Brien, 86, Irish politician, TD (1973–1992), Lord Mayor of Dublin (1980–1981).
- Rough Quest, 30, British racehorse, winner of the 1996 Grand National, euthanised.
- Pat Scott, 87, American baseball player (AAGPBL).
- Mary Sheriff, 66, American art historian.
- Norman Sherry, 91, British author.
- Sammy Smyth, 91, Northern Irish footballer (Wolverhampton Wanderers F.C.).
- Giovanni Steffè, 88, Italian Olympic rower.

=== 20 ===
- Achieng Abura, 50s, Kenyan musician.
- Edward A. Allworth, 95, American historian.
- Henry J. M. Barnett, 94, Canadian physician.
- David Bellini, 43, Italian screenwriter (Un medico in famiglia), lymphoma.
- Bob Blauner, 87, American sociologist.
- William G. Bowen, 83, American educator, President of Princeton University (1972–1988).
- Kenneth Brandt, 77, American politician, member of the Pennsylvania House of Representatives (1973-1990).
- Gail Cogdill, 79, American football player (Detroit Lions).
- Roy D'Andrade, 84, American psychological anthropologist.
- Uwe Dreher, 56, German footballer (Stuttgarter Kickers).
- Seiji Hirao, 53, Japanese rugby union player and coach, bile duct cancer.
- Kaneta Kimotsuki, 80, Japanese voice actor (Doraemon, Anpanman), pneumonia.
- Roger Lallemand, 84, Belgian lawyer and politician, President of the Senate (1988).
- Eric Harold Mansfield, 93, British aeronautical engineer.
- Michael Massee, 64, American actor (The Crow, 24, The Amazing Spider-Man), stomach cancer.
- Issifou Okoulou-Kantchati, 65, Togolese politician.
- Giorgos Pavlidis, 60, Greek politician, Governor of Eastern Macedonia and Thrace (since 2014), cancer.
- Svetlana Penkina, 65, Belarusian actress.
- Benedict Read, 71, British art historian.
- Simone Schaller, 104, American hurdler.
- Stanley Silverstein, 91, American footwear manufacturer.
- Junko Tabei, 77, Japanese mountaineer, first woman to climb Mount Everest, peritoneal cancer.
- Mieke Telkamp, 82, Dutch singer.
- Robert Weber, 92, American cartoonist.

=== 21 ===
- Wally Argus, 95, New Zealand rugby union player (Canterbury, national team).
- Paweł Baumann, 33, Polish Olympic sprint canoer (2004, 2008), world championship silver medalist (2006, 2007).
- Margaret Benyon, 76, British hologram artist.
- Dave Cash, 74, British radio presenter.
- Richard Cavendish, 86, British occult writer.
- Mary Keating Croce, 87, American politician.
- Ted Follows, 89, Canadian actor.
- Constantin Frățilă, 74, Romanian footballer (FC Dinamo București).
- Sergio Guzmán, 92, Chilean Olympic sprinter.
- Frans Jozef van der Heijden, 78, Dutch politician, member of the House of Representatives (1982–1998), euthanasia.
- Roy Jennings, 84, English footballer (Brighton and Hove Albion).
- Dan Johnston, 77, American lawyer and politician.
- Satyadev Katare, 61, Indian politician.
- George Konik, 79, Canadian ice hockey player (Minnesota Fighting Saints, Pittsburgh Penguins).
- Kenji Kosaka, 70, Japanese politician, Minister of Education (2005–2006).
- Manfred Krug, 79, German actor (Tatort, Liebling Kreuzberg), singer, and author.
- Frenchy Martin, 69, Canadian professional wrestler and manager (WWF), bladder cancer.
- Bob McCord, 82, Canadian ice hockey player (Boston Bruins, Detroit Red Wings).
- Kevin Meaney, 60, American comedian and actor (Big, Uncle Buck, Mad Jack the Pirate), heart attack.
- Clément Michu, 79, French actor (Commissaire Moulin, Thierry la Fronde).
- Paolo Micolini, 77, Italian politician.
- Moscow Flyer, 22, Irish racehorse, colic. (death announced on this date)
- Richard Nicoll, 39, British-Australian fashion designer, heart attack.
- Janet Patterson, 60, Australian costume designer (The Piano, Peter Pan, Bright Star).
- David Pope, 54, American basketball player (Kansas City Kings, Seattle SuperSonics).
- Jerry Rullo, 93, American basketball player (Philadelphia Warriors, Baltimore Bullets).
- Raine Spencer, Countess Spencer, 87, British socialite and politician.
- C. Peter Wagner, 86, American theologian and religious leader (New Apostolic Reformation).
- Robert Windom, 86, American physician.

=== 22 ===
- Martin Aitchison, 96, British illustrator.
- Anthony Bryer, 78, British historian.
- José Oscar Barahona Castillo, 77, Salvadoran Roman Catholic prelate, Bishop of San Vicente (1983–2005).
- Steve Dillon, 54, English comic book artist (Preacher, The Punisher, Judge Dredd), appendicitis.
- Gordon Hamilton, 50, Scottish climate scientist, snowmobile crash.
- Herb Kent, 88, American radio disc jockey.
- Gavin MacFadyen, 76, American investigative journalist (CIJ) and filmmaker.
- Mehar Mittal, 80, Indian Punjabi actor and producer.
- Monarchos, 18, American Thoroughbred racehorse, winner of the 2001 Kentucky Derby.
- Osamu Naito, 67, Japanese speed skater.
- Antoon Postma, 87, Dutch anthropologist.
- Colin Snedeker, 80, British-born American chemist (Crayola), inventor of the washable crayon.
- Moncrieff J. Spear, 95, American diplomat.
- Sheri S. Tepper, 87, American science fiction author.
- Frans Tutuhatunewa, 93, Indonesian politician, President in Exile of Republic of South Maluku (1993–2010).
- Bob Vanatta, 98, American college basketball coach (Missouri State, Memphis, Missouri).
- Valeriya Zaklunna, 74, Ukrainian actress and politician, Member of Verkhovna Rada (1998–2007).

=== 23 ===
- Isaac Abella, 82, Canadian-born American physicist, complications from cancer.
- Mike Bolan, 83, Canadian politician, member of the Legislative Assembly of Ontario (1977–1981).
- Pete Burns, 57, English singer-songwriter (Dead or Alive), cardiac arrest.
- Jack Chick, 92, American cartoonist (Chick tracts) and fundamentalist Christian publisher.
- Tom Hayden, 76, American writer, politician and activist (Chicago Seven), member of the California State Senate (1992–2000).
- Mikijirō Hira, 82, Japanese actor (Rampo, 13 Assassins, Three Outlaw Samurai).
- Nerses Hovhannisyan, 78, Armenian film director, actor and screenwriter.
- Khalifa bin Hamad Al Thani, 84, Qatari monarch, Emir (1972–1995).
- William Löfqvist, 69, Swedish ice hockey player, Olympic bronze medalist (1980).
- Harold Mann, 78, Canadian boxer, Commonwealth Games gold medalist (1962).
- Miguel Marina, 88, Spanish Olympic sport shooter.
- Natsuyuki Nakanishi, 81, Japanese artist, cerebral infarction.
- Jimmy Perry, 93, English actor and screenwriter (Dad's Army, It Ain't Half Hot Mum, Hi-de-Hi!).
- Heinz Poenn, 82, Canadian Olympic slalom canoeist (1972).
- Bob Saunders, 87, American politician, member of the Florida Senate (1969–1971, 1973–1976).
- Jerzy Szymczyk, 74, Polish Olympic volleyball player.
- Haguroiwa Tomomi, 70, Japanese sumo wrestler, kidney failure.
- Wim van der Voort, 93, Dutch speed skater, Olympic silver medalist (1952).

=== 24 ===
- Arthure Agathine, 55, Seychellois Olympic triple jumper (1980).
- Jorge Batlle, 88, Uruguayan politician, President (2000–2005), cerebral hemorrhage.
- Gwanda Chakuamba, 82, Malawian politician.
- Eddy Christiani, 98, Dutch musician and songwriter.
- Benjamin Creme, 93, Scottish artist, author and esotericist.
- Roland Dobbs, 91, British physicist.
- Bill Duckworth, 98, Australian footballer.
- Herón Escobar, 62, Mexican politician, member of Congress (2009–2012).
- Robert Fogelin, 84, American philosopher, complications from Parkinson's disease.
- Bruce Goodluck, 83, Australian politician.
- Reinhard Häfner, 64, German footballer (Dynamo Dresden), Olympic champion (1976).
- Bohdan Hawrylyshyn, 90, Ukrainian-born Canadian economist.
- Siv Holma, 64, Swedish politician, MP for Norrbotten (1998–2014), cancer.
- W. Dudley Johnson, 86, American surgeon.
- Hellmut von Leipzig, 95, German soldier.
- Harry Merlo, 91, American business and sports executive.
- Wayne Peckham, 72, Australian rugby league footballer (Penrith, Canterbury Bankstown).
- Vic Rapp, 86, American-Canadian football coach (BC Lions).
- Eugeniusz Rudnik, 83, Polish composer and sound engineer.
- Rolf Heinrich Sabersky, 96, German-born American mechanical engineer.
- Jack Sellers, 72, American race car driver.
- Roger Slack, 79, British-born New Zealand plant biologist and biochemist.
- Johan Stølan, 77, Norwegian politician.
- Felix Ungacta, 78, Guamanian politician, Mayor of Hagåtña (1981–2005).
- Pierre Vallon, 89, French politician.
- Bobby Vee, 73, American pop singer ("Rubber Ball", "Take Good Care of My Baby", "The Night Has a Thousand Eyes") and actor, Alzheimer's disease.
- Charles Wolf Jr., 92, American economist, cardiac arrest.
- John P. Woodall, 81, British entomologist.

=== 25 ===
- Margaret Ashcroft, 85, British television actress (The Main Chance, The Brothers).
- Margit Bara, 88, Hungarian actress (Jacob the Liar).
- Kevin Curran, 59, American television writer (The Simpsons, Married... with Children, Late Night with David Letterman), cancer.
- Howard Davies, 71, British theatre and television director.
- Mel Haber, 80, American philanthropist, and hotel and restaurant proprietor.
- Safa Haeri, 79, Iranian-born French journalist.
- Mohamed Nadir Hamimid, 75, Algerian politician.
- Bob Hoover, 94, American Air Force test pilot.
- Bjørn Lidin Hansen, 27, Norwegian footballer (Tromsø, Lyn), suicide.
- Burnet R. Maybank Jr., 92, American lawyer and politician, Lieutenant Governor of South Carolina (1959–1963).
- Krešo Omerzel, 59, Slovenian speedway rider and coach.
- Edouard Pliner, 80, Russian figure skating coach.
- Doug Pyzer, 93, Canadian football player (Toronto Argonauts).
- Thomas Rentschler, 84, American politician.
- Vaino Spencer, 96, American judge.
- Jerzy Szacki, 87, Polish sociologist.
- Georges Thines, 93, Belgian scientist.
- Carlos Alberto Torres, 72, Brazilian football player and manager, world champion (1970), heart attack.

=== 26 ===
- Melis Abzalov, 77, Uzbek filmmaker (Oʻtgan kunlar).
- Raj Begum, 89, Indian singer.
- Melpomeni Çobani, 88, Albanian actress.
- Filomeno Codiñera, 77, Filipino baseball and softball player.
- Tim Couzens, 72, South African historian.
- Kent Frizzell, 87, American attorney and politician.
- Antero Halonen, 77, Finnish Olympic boxer.
- Arne Hartman, 76, Finnish diplomat.
- Mark Johnson, 65, American baseball umpire.
- Gérard Lamy, 97, Canadian politician.
- Birger Larsen, 54, Danish film director (Dance of the Polar Bears).
- William Eteki Mboumoua, 83, Cameroonian politician and diplomat.
- Donald C. Pogue, 69, American federal judge, U.S. Court of International Trade (1995–2014).
- Taqi Tabatabaei Qomi, 93, Iranian grand ayatollah.
- Luciano Rispoli, 84, Italian television and radio writer and presenter.
- Samuele Schiavina, 45, Italian racing cyclist.
- Ali Hussein Shihab, 55, Iraqi footballer (national team).
- Jack H. Schofield, 93, American politician.
- Yuichi Takai, 84, Japanese writer, heart failure.
- Notable American crime victims, shot:
  - Nehemiah Kauffman, 20
  - Sydney Land, 21

=== 27 ===
- João Lobo Antunes, 72, Portuguese neurosurgeon, melanoma.
- John M. Berry, 81, American politician.
- Fred Burrall, 81, American politician.
- Victor Cannings, 97, English cricketer (Hampshire).
- René Chamussy, 79, French-Lebanese priest and rector.
- Jim Eddy, 80, American football coach (Saskatchewan Roughriders, Houston Oilers, Dallas Cowboys).
- Elda Grin, 88, Armenian writer and psychologist.
- Brian Hill, 75, English footballer (Coventry City).
- Ruben Hovsepyan, 77, Armenian author and politician.
- Jolanda Insana, 79, Italian poet and translator, Viareggio Prize recipient.
- Fatim Jawara, 19, Gambian footballer (national team), drowned.
- Susan Lindquist, 67, American biologist, cancer.
- Frank Marchlewski, 73, American football player.
- Bill Miller, 86, American javelin thrower, Olympic silver medalist (1952).
- Nelson Pinedo, 88, Colombian singer (Sonora Matancera), stroke.
- Hazel Shermet, 96, American actress (Duffy's Tavern, New Zoo Revue, Jem) and singer.
- Pentti Siimes, 87, Finnish actor (The Unknown Soldier).
- Carol Summers, 90, American printmaker.
- Takahito, Prince Mikasa, 100, Japanese royal, heart failure.
- Francis Tong Hui, 83, Chinese clandestine Roman Catholic prelate, Bishop of Yan’an (1999–2011).
- David Tyack, 85, American historian, Parkinson's disease.
- Richard W. Waddell, 94, American politician.
- Bobby Wellins, 80, Scottish jazz saxophonist.
- John Zacherle, 98, American television and radio personality and voice actor.
- Vladimir Zemlyanikin, 83, Russian film and theater actor (The House I Live In).

=== 28 ===
- Gillon Aitken, 78, English literary agent.
- Melhem Barakat, 71, Lebanese singer.
- Sir Nicholas Brathwaite, 91, Grenadian politician, Prime Minister (1990–1995), Chairman of the Interim Advisory Council (1983–1984).
- H. Kay Hedge, 88, American politician, member of the Iowa Senate (1989-2001).
- Shashikala Kakodkar, 81, Indian politician.
- Angeline Kopka, 100, American politician, member of the New Hampshire House of Representatives (2002–2010, 2012–2014).
- Bumphen Luttimol, 86, Thai footballer
- Henk Zwartepoorte, 67, Dutch herpetologist.

=== 29 ===
- Robert Belfanti, 68, American politician, member of the Pennsylvania House of Representatives (1979–2010).
- Norman Brokaw, 89, American talent agent (Marilyn Monroe, Clint Eastwood, Andy Griffith).
- Nguyễn Văn Chính, 92, Vietnamese politician.
- Paul Demers, 60, Canadian singer-songwriter, mesothelioma.
- Roland Dyens, 61, French classical guitarist and composer.
- Tony Gauci, 75, Maltese businessman, witness in the Lockerbie bombing case.
- Christiane Gilles, 86, French trade unionist
- Raymond Gilmour, 56 or 57, Northern Irish undercover agent, infiltrated INLA and PIRA. (death announced on this date)
- Rami Hassanein, 38, Egyptian officer.
- E. Lee Hennessee, 64, American hedge fund manager.
- John Hicks, 65, American football player (New York Giants), diabetes.
- Ronald Hunt, 87, Australian Olympic wrestler.
- Francis Huxley, 93, British anthropologist.
- Stefan Jentsch, 61, German biologist.
- Dave Lanning, 78, English sports commentator.
- Paul Luebke, 70, American politician, member of the North Carolina House of Representatives (since 1991), lymphoma.
- Angus Mackay, 86-87, Scottish historian.
- Thorvald Mellingen, 81, Norwegian engineer.
- Fernando Moresi, 46, Argentine Olympic field hockey player (1996), Pan American champion (1995).
- Kalle Reichelt, 82, Norwegian physician.
- John D. Roberts, 98, American chemist.
- Geraldo Scarpone Caporale, 88, American-born Honduran Roman Catholic prelate, Bishop of Comayagua (1979–2004).
- Pen Sovan, 80, Cambodian politician, Prime Minister (1981).
- Barry Stout, 79, American politician, member of the Pennsylvania House of Representatives (1971–1976) and Senate (1977–2010).
- Tom Weal, 87, New Zealand politician.

=== 30 ===
- Törner Åhsman, 85, Swedish Olympic boxer (1956).
- Pablo Ansaldo, 81, Ecuadorian footballer.
- Reg Boorman, 80, New Zealand politician, MP for Wairarapa (1984–1988).
- Jack Braughton, 95, British Olympic long-distance runner (1948).
- Fausto Cayambe, 40, Ecuadorian politician.
- James Galanos, 92, American fashion designer.
- Tammy Grimes, 82, American actress (The Unsinkable Molly Brown, High Spirits, Look After Lulu!), Tony winner (1961, 1970).
- Barney Hartman, 99, Canadian skeet shooter.
- Sam Helton, 62, American politician.
- Imre Józsa, 62, Hungarian actor.
- Betty Ann Kennedy, 86, American bridge player.
- Gil Krueger, 87, American football coach (Northern Michigan).
- Don Marshall, 80, American actor (Land of the Giants, Star Trek).
- David Nash, 77, Welsh rugby union player.
- Otaru Salihu Ohize, 63, Nigerian politician.
- Curly Putman, 85, American songwriter ("Green, Green Grass of Home", "D-I-V-O-R-C-E", "He Stopped Loving Her Today").
- Simon Relph, 76, British film producer and assistant director (Reds, The Ploughman's Lunch), pneumonia.
- René Velázquez Valenzuela, Mexican suspected hitman, leader of the Sinaloa Cartel, shot.

=== 31 ===
- Natalie Babbitt, 84, American children's author and illustrator (Tuck Everlasting), lung cancer.
- Eric Christiansen, 79, British medieval historian.
- Abdul Majid Cockar, 93, Kenyan judge, Chief Justice (1994–1997).
- Paul Detienne, 91, Belgian Jesuit priest, scholar and writer of Bengali literature.
- Silvio Gazzaniga, 95, Italian sculptor (FIFA World Cup Trophy).
- Jimmy Gray, 90, English cricketer (Hampshire).
- Andy Hill, 54, American politician, member of the Washington Senate (since 2011), lung cancer.
- Huo Xuan, 28, Chinese volleyball player (national team), heart attack.
- Gene La Rocque, 98, American rear admiral.
- Stanley Leavy, 101, American psychoanalyst.
- Burton Levin, 86, American diplomat.
- Ray Mabbutt, 80, English footballer, heart attack.
- Reynaldo Miravalles, 93, Cuban actor.
- Abdelkader Morchid, 77–78, Moroccan footballer.
- Lionel Morrison, 81, South African-born British journalist and trade unionist.
- Number 16, 43, Australian trapdoor spider, longest-lived spider on record, parasitic wasp sting. (death discovered on this date)
- Klaus Schulten, 69, German-American physicist.
- Patrick Sharkey, 85, Irish Olympic boxer (1956).
- Vladimir Zeldin, 101, Russian theater and film actor (Desyat Negrityat), People's Artist of the USSR.
