= Gordon Stewart =

Gordon Stewart may refer to:

- Gordon Stewart (cricketer) (1906–1984), Australian cricketer
- Gordon Stewart (epidemiologist) (1919–2016), Scottish epidemiologist
- Gordon Stewart (soccer) (1927–1980), South African footballer
- Gordon Curran Stewart (1939–2014), American speechwriter, academic, businessman and publisher
- Gordon Stewart (organist), British organist, conductor and teacher
- Gordon Neil Stewart (1912–1999), Australian writer
- Butch Stewart (Gordon Arthur Cyril Stewart, 1941–2021), Jamaican hotelier and businessman
- St George Henry Rathborne (1854–1938), who wrote under this pseudonym
- Gordon Stewart (Home and Away), a character on the Australian soap opera

== See also ==
- Gordon Stuart (disambiguation)
- Stewart Gordon (disambiguation)
