= Dudley Johnson =

Dudley Johnson may refer to:

- Dudley Johnson (British Army officer) (1884–1975), British Army officer and Victoria Cross recipient
- W. Dudley Johnson (1930–2016), American cardiothoracic surgeon
