= Young (Korean name) =

Young (Korean: 영), also spelled Yeong, Yong, or Yung, is an uncommon Korean surname and a Korean given name.

== Family name ==
As a Korean family name, Young can be written with three different hanja, indicating different lineages. According to the 2000 South Korean Census, a total of 259 people had these family names.

- 永 (길 영 gil yeong 'eternal'): 132 people and 40 households. Reported bongwan (clan hometowns) included Gangnyeong, Gyeongju, and Pyeonghae. Although the family name was found in numerous historical records, it was recorded under the census for the first time in a 1930 survey by Japanese colonial government with one family living in Seoul. More families bearing the surname has been found since then in the contemporary census surveys.
- 榮 (영화 영 yeonghwa yeong 'flourishing'): 86 people and 20 households. There was one reported bongwan, Yeongcheon, and two people whose bongwan was not recorded. This character is also used to write a Chinese family name now pronounced Róng in Mandarin.
- 影 (그림자 영 geurimja yeong 'shadow' or 'reflection'): 41 people and 15 households. There was one reported bongwan, Seoncheon, and one person whose bongwan was not recorded. Seoncheon is located in an area that became North Korean territory after the division of Korea; one person with this family name who had come from North Korea and was living in Seoul stated that there had previously been many more people with that family name living near Seoncheon.

== Given name ==
Koreans with the given name Young include:

- Ch'oe Yŏng (1316–1388), Goryeo dynasty male general
- Song Yeong (born 1950), South Korean male writer
- Chin Young (born 1950), South Korean male politician
- Kim Young (born 1980), South Korean female professional golfer
- Seo Young (born 1984), South Korean actress
- You Young (born 2004), South Korean female figure skater

== See also ==
- List of Korean given names
