= Gordon Stuart (disambiguation) =

Gordon Stuart (1924–2015) was a Canadian-born Welsh portrait artist.

Gordon Stuart may also refer to:

- Gordon Stuart, pen name of Canadian author H. Bedford Jones
- Gordon Stuart, pen name of American author Harry Lincoln Sayler

== See also ==
- Gordon Stewart (disambiguation)
- Stuart Gordon (disambiguation)
