= Peace Bringing Back Abundance =

1780 painting by Elisabeth Louise Vigée Le Brun

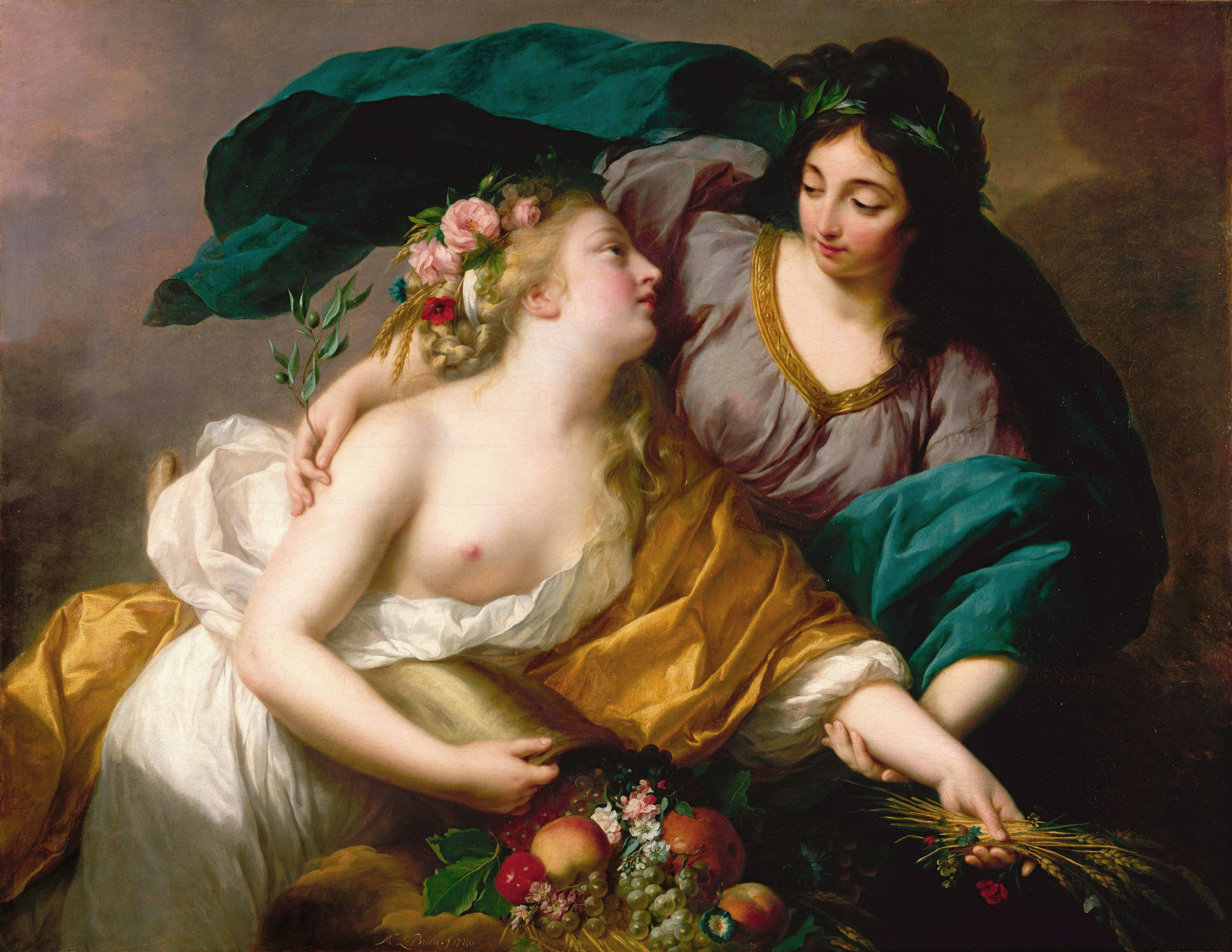
- Artist: Elisabeth Vigée Le Brun
- Year: 1780
- Medium: Oil on canvas
- Dimensions: 103 cm × 133 cm (41 in × 52 in)
- Location: Louvre, Paris

Peace Bringing Back Abundance was painted by Élisabeth Vigée Le Brun in 1780 and is now part of the collection of the Louvre, in Paris. The Rococo painting is an allegory of Peace and Abundance, which the artist submitted as her reception piece for admission into the French Royal Academy of Painting and Sculpture in 1783. The work was originally received with mixed reviews, with some art critics commending Vigée Le Brun for her talent while others rebuked her for the subject choice and questioned her abilities. At the time it was submitted, it was seen as a commentary on the reign of Louis XVI and the signing of a treaty formally ending France's involvement in the American Revolution.

== Description ==
The two central figures in the artwork are allegories of Peace and Abundance. Peace appears on the right side of the composition and Abundance on the left. Abundance is partially nude, which indicates her status as an allegorical figure. The art historian Mary Sheriff notes that it was a common practice in the eighteenth century for artists to use the idealized female nude to signify that the figure represents an abstract idea rather than a real person.

The imagery in this artwork carries gendered associations in line with the common visual language of the eighteenth century. Peace has dark hair and clothing, while Abundance has blonde hair and a white dress. Peace's clothing billows up over the composition, while Abundance's drapes down calmly. The flowers and fruits surrounding Abundance associate her with finery and ornamentation that contrasts with the simplicity of Peace's plain depiction. According to Sheriff, the more masculine figure of Peace is guiding and controlling the more feminine Abundance. Peace's left hand holds Abundance's left wrist while her right hand pushes on Abundance's shoulder. These subtle hand gestures convey this element of guidance and direction. The physical contact between the two women and the naturalism with which they are depicted has led some art historians to assign erotic associations to the work. Sheriff notes that conventional eighteenth-century allegorical figures would have been abstracted and expressionless. In contrast, Peace and Abundance are naturalistic and full of emotion in Vigée Le Brun's work. The figures' eye contact and facial expressions communicate a physical and emotional interaction between the two women. Sheriff notes that the more masculine appearance of Abundance and the more feminine Peace recall the unbalanced power relations characteristic of eighteenth-century visual culture and erotica.

While the painting initially appears to follow this traditional gendered symbolism, Sheriff argues that Vigée Le Brun ultimately disrupts this conventional structure. She portrays the two figures as dynamic, independent women rather than mere symbolic representations of masculinity and femininity.

== Style and connection to other works ==
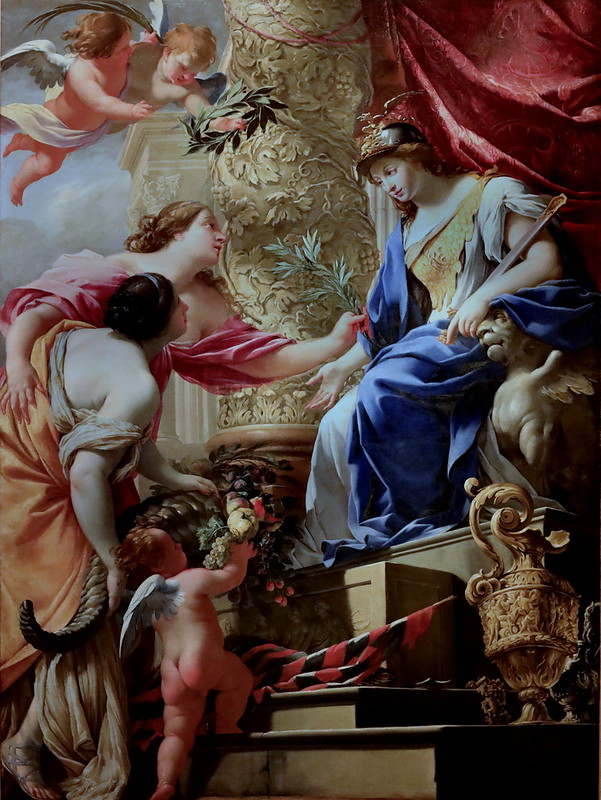
Simon Vouet's Prudence Leading Peace and Abundance, 1630

Vigée Le Brun represents the allegories of Peace and Abundance in a naturalistic manner. Allegories had traditionally been painted symbolically and without expression, as in Simon Vouet's Prudence Leading Peace and Abundance from 1630. Vigée Le Brun's rendition is distinct from this earlier work through her proximate positioning and intimate, shared expression between the allegories. Vigée Le Brun's painting was also compared by critics at the time to the work of the Flemish baroque artist Peter Paul Rubens for her use of a bright and natural color scheme. Vigée Le Brun was largely inspired by the Baroque style at Versailles from her work and patronage there.

== Interpretations ==
Peace Bringing Back Abundance has sometimes been interpreted in the political context of the monarchy under Louis XVI. France signed the Treaty of Paris (1783) which marked the conclusion of their assistance in the American Revolution. Vigée Le Brun's work could be seen as anticipating this peace, given it was made in 1780, before the treaty occurred. Sheriff suggests that this depiction about seeing peace could be viewed in the context of art itself. Once France was no longer helping the Americans, there would be more resources to contribute to the arts. Differing from other paintings that conveyed the peace of the time, Vigée Le Brun does not include a figure that is supposed to represent Louis XVI, which casts some doubt on this interpretation. Sheriff argues that Peace Bringing Back Abundance only began to be viewed in the context of what was happening politically after the fact.

Vigée Le Brun's work could also be seen in the context of her relationship with Marie Antoinette. Vigée Le Brun relied on the Queen's support for her artistic career. The painting shows one woman relying on another, which reflects the relationship between Vigée Le Brun and Marie Antoinette as artist and patron. There were multiple paintings representing France and the monarchy in the Salon de la Paix at Versailles, which was a room part of Marie Antoinette's quarters. Given the artist visited this room in order to paint Marie Antoinette, it is possible she wanted to add to the existing paintings with a work focusing on peace.

== Critiques ==
When Vigée Le Brun submitted Peace Bringing Back Abundance to the Académie Royale in 1783, her work garnered much attention, with critics both celebrating and harshly criticizing her work. One gossip column, Mémoires secrets, spoke of how Vigée Le Brun's colleagues accused her of not completing her own paintings and that another artist, François-Guillaume Ménageot, would assist her. Further, some critics accused Vigée Le Brun of simply copying the work of other artists such as Guido, Cortona, Cignani, and Jean-Baptiste Santerre.

Moreover, Vigée Le Brun was heavily criticized for being a female artist, which was very difficult at the time. One critic commented on Vigée Le Brun portraying female subjects in the work, feeling that painting women was a pleasure that men alone could enjoy. By painting primarily female subjects, Vigée Le Brun was seen as usurping and disrupting male rights. In particular, Charles Blanc commented on a "strange embarrassment" felt by viewers, potentially because of the erotic and sensual portrayal of two women.

However, multiple fellow artists and critics recognized this work for its beauty, such as John Trumbull, who commented on the beauty of the coloring and the extraordinary talent of Vigée Le Brun. She was admitted to the Académie Royale with the assistance of Marie Antoinette in 1783 on the basis of the talent she displayed in Peace Bringing Back Abundance.
