= Elliot Whitney =

Group pseudonym used by various authors

Elliot Whitney was a group pseudonym used by various authors including:

- H. Bedford-Jones
- Harry Lincoln Sayler
