= Stuart Gordon (disambiguation) =

Stuart Gordon (1947–2020) was an American director, writer and producer.

Stuart Gordon may also refer to:

- Stuart Gordon (Brookside), a character from the British soap opera Brookside
- Stuart Gordon (musician) (1950–2014), musician with The Korgis
- Richard Gordon (Scottish author) (1947–2009), Scottish author who wrote under the pen name Stuart Gordon

== See also ==
- George Stuart Gordon (1881–1942), British academic and professor of poetry
- Stewart Gordon (disambiguation)
- Gordon Stuart (disambiguation)
