= Stewart Gordon =

Stewart Gordon may refer to:

- Stewart L. Gordon (born 1930), American musician and academic
- Stewart N. Gordon (born 1945), American historian and writer

== See also ==
- Stuart Gordon (disambiguation)
- Gordon Stewart (disambiguation)
