= Jack H. Schofield =

American politician (1923–2016)

Member of the New Hampshire House of Representatives from the Carroll 4th district
- In office 1984–1988

Personal details
- Born: June 18, 1923 Charleston, West Virginia, U.S.
- Died: October 26, 2016 (aged 93)
- Party: Republican
- Education: George Washington University; Harvard Graduate School of Business

Jack H. Schofield (June 18, 1923 – October 26, 2016) was an American politician. He served as a Republican member for the Carroll 4th district of the New Hampshire House of Representatives.

== Life and career ==
Schofield was born in Charleston, West Virginia. He attended George Washington University and Harvard Graduate School of Business.

Schofield served in the New Hampshire House of Representatives from 1984 to 1988.

Schofield died on October 26, 2016, at the age of 93.
