= Don Ringe =

American journalist (c. 1946–2016)

Don Ringe (/ˈrɪndʒ/; born c. 1946 – October 11, 2016) was an American political media consultant, Emmy Award winning journalist, documentary filmmaker and online innovator in both the US and overseas. He was a graduate of the Columbia University Graduate School of Journalism (MS) and Hofstra University (BA). He held a Certificate in Advanced Advertising Studies from the University of Southern California Graduate School of Business.

While attending Columbia University he was hired by David Wolper Productions as noted author Theodore White’s research assistant for the CBS television special, "Making of the President, 1968." He was also the assistant to the producer of Wolper’s ABC special, "The Unfinished Journey of Robert F. Kennedy."

He began his career as a copy boy at Newsday at the age of 18 while attending Hofstra University. In 1970 he established one of the first political media firms in the country and created the media for the successful Los Angeles Police and Fire Association's Proposition 2, the ballot initiative to re-build the LA city schools after the 1970 earthquake, and a statewide ballot initiative to expand and upgrade the UC Medical School system.

Ringe was the director of special projects at KABC-TV News in Los Angeles, then executive news producer at KPIX-TV in San Francisco, and shortly thereafter, news director and executive producer of programming at WNAC-TV, then the CBS affiliate in Boston.

He founded Ringe Media in 1978 with the campaigns of US Senators Ed Brooke and John Warner, as well as Texas Governor William Clements. He subsequently worked on many US Senate, gubernatorial, and House campaigns, as well as campaigns for president in the US, Nigeria and Ecuador.

Ringe was hired on a $40,000-per-month retainer by the Dole for President presidential campaign of 1988, but never produced an ad.

His most recent client was Democratic Congresswoman Jane Harman's 2010 re-election campaign.

He has created national award winning programs on alcohol and drug abuse for children and teens, as well as a PBS documentary on glass master, Dale Chihuly. Most recently, Ringe Media has created television and internet video media for campaigns on behalf of the international Westfield Group, the California-based Kilroy Realty Corporation, and Marymount College, among others.

Ringe provided the campaign media for statewide ballot initiatives on the issues of (pro) gun control, saving sea life through a ban on gillnet fishing, rebuilding Los Angeles earthquake damaged schools and many others.

Ringe worked as a documentary writer-producer-director for network television shows including "In Search of Ancient Astronauts" with Rod Serling; and, "Armies of the Ants", an eco-documentary shot in the Amazon, Panamanian and Costa Rican rain forests. He also wrote and produced "Undersea Oasis", a children’s TV special on artificial reefs.

From 1974–1978 he was a producer, executive producer and news director of network affiliate television stations in Los Angeles, San Francisco and Boston.

In 1978 he founded Ringe Media, a communications company specializing in public affairs and political media campaigns, as well as educational and entertainment media. RMI has provided the advertising for many US Senate and gubernatorial campaigns, as well as for Presidential campaigns in the US and abroad. The firm also creates media for ballot initiatives, associations and special interest groups.

== Sources ==
- Huffington Post. Don Ringe | HuffPost.
- Ringe Media. Ringe Media - A Public Affairs Media Company.
