= Paolo Micolini =

Italian politician

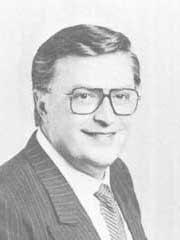

Member of the Senate
- In office 2 July 1987 – 14 April 1994
- Constituency: Friuli-Venezia Giulia; Cividale del Friuli

Member of the Chamber of Deputies
- In office 1986 – 1 July 1987
- Constituency: Udine

Personal details
- Born: 2 December 1938
- Died: 21 October 2016 (aged 77) Scodovacca, Cervignano del Friuli
- Party: Christian Democracy

Paolo Micolini (2 December 1938 – 21 October 2016) was an Italian politician. He served a partial term in the Chamber of Deputies and was twice elected to the Senate.

Micolini died at home in Scodovacca in 2016, aged 77.
