= Arne Hartman =

Finnish diplomat

Carl Arne Hartman (20 March 1940 – 26 October 2016) was a Finnish diplomat, and a licentiate of political science. He was an ambassador to Baghdad from 1990 to 1991 and a minister counselor in Copenhagen since 1992. Hartman was head of the Office for Political Affairs in the Ministry for Foreign Affairs from 1988 to 1990 and foreign affairs counselor from 1991 to 1992. He was a secretary at the Finnish embassy in Lusaka from 1974 to 1978.
