= Pietro Diana (painter) =

Italian printer, engraver, and designer

Pietro Diana (28 December 1931 – 12 October 2016) was an Italian printer, engraver, and designer, as well as a creator of "automates".

== Bibliography ==
- Giorgio Auneddu, Pietro Diana: incisioni, disegni, automates (opere recenti 1975–1991), Torino, Tuttagrafica, 1991
