= Vincenzino Culicchia =

Italian politician (1932–2016)

Mayor of Partanna
- In office 1962 – 22 April 1992

Member of the Chamber of Deputies
- In office 23 April 1992 – 14 April 1994
- Constituency: Sicily

Personal details
- Born: 9 October 1932 Partanna
- Died: 17 October 2016 (aged 83) Partanna
- Party: Pact of Democrats for Reforms
- Other political affiliations: Christian Democracy

Vincenzino Culicchia (9 October 1932 – 17 October 2016) was an Italian politician. He was the mayor of his hometown, Partanna, from 1962 to 1992, when he was elected to the Chamber of Deputies. Culicchia served one term as a national deputy, representing Sicily until 1994.

He died at the age of 83 in 2016.
