= Miguel Marina =

Spanish sports shooter

Personal information
- Born: 31 January 1928 Havana, Cuba
- Died: 23 October 2016 (aged 88)

Sport
- Sport: Sports shooting

Miguel Marina (31 January 1928 – 23 October 2016) was a Spanish sports shooter. He competed at the 1968 Summer Olympics and the 1972 Summer Olympics.
