= Issifou Okoulou-Kantchati =

Togolese politician (1951–2016)

Issifou Okoulou-Kantchati (23 January 1951 – 20 October 2016) was a Togolese politician, who last served in the government of Togo as Minister of City Planning and Housing.

== Biography ==
Okoulou-Kantchati was born in Mango, located in the Oti Prefecture of Togo. He studied in France and became a member of the Central Committee of the Rally of the Togolese People (RPT) in 1977. In the 1990s, Okoulou-Kantchati headed the Alliance of Democrats for the Republic (ADR), a political party. He was Quaestor of the High Council of the Republic, which was established as the transitional parliament in 1991. In an August 1996 by-election for a seat in the National Assembly from Oti, Okoulou-Kantchati, standing as the ADR candidate, placed second in the first round, receiving 32.89% of the vote against 40.19% for RPT candidate Stanislas Baba. Baba then narrowly defeated him in the second round, receiving 51.41% of the vote.

Okoulou-Kantchati later joined the RPT. In the March 1999 parliamentary election, he was elected to the National Assembly as the RPT candidate in the First Constituency of Oti Prefecture; he faced no opposition and won the seat with 100% of the vote. He was re-elected to the National Assembly in the October 2002 parliamentary election and served as President of the Finance Commission in the National Assembly. On 29 July 2003, Okoulou-Kantchati was appointed to the government as Minister of Energy and Water Resources.

His house in Mango was attacked by opposition supporters amidst the violence that surrounded the April 2005 presidential election. After that election, he was moved to the post of Minister of the Environment and Forest Resources on 20 June 2005. He was the first candidate on the RPT's candidate list for Oti constituency in the October 2007 parliamentary election and won a seat. At the time of the election, he was the RPT Coordinator in Savanes Region. Following the election, he was designated as one of seven members of a committee to amend the National Assembly's rules of procedure on 14 November 2007. He remained in the government that was formed after the election in December 2007.

Okoulou-Kantchati remained in his post as Minister of the Environment and Forest Resources until 15 September 2008, when he was instead appointed as Minister of City Planning and Housing.
