= Sam Helton =

American politician (1954–2016)

Member of the Oklahoma Senate from the 31st district
- In office November 1990 – November 2004
- Preceded by: Paul Taliaferro
- Succeeded by: Don Barrington

Personal details
- Born: Sam Lee Helton; August 31, 1954 Lawton, Oklahoma, U.S.
- Died: October 30, 2016 (aged 62) Walters, Oklahoma, U.S
- Party: Democratic Party
- Education: Western Oklahoma State College; Mid-American Christian University

Sam Helton (August 31, 1954 – October 30, 2016) was an American politician who served in the Oklahoma Senate representing the 31st district from 1990 to 2004.

== Biography ==
Sam Lee Helton was born on August 31, 1954, in Lawton, Oklahoma, to Joe and Vallene Helton. He graduated from Lawton High School in 1972. He attended Cameron University before earning an associate's degree from Western Oklahoma State College and a bachelor's degree Mid-American Christian University in Oklahoma City. In 1982, he joined the Lawton Police Department. Helton was elected to the Oklahoma Senate as a member of the Democratic Party representing the 31st district from 1990 to 2004. He was preceded in office by Paul Taliaferro and succeeded in office by Don Barrington. He died on October 30, 2016, in Walters, Oklahoma.
