= David Abdulai =

Ghanaian philanthropist and physician

- Born: David Fuseini Abdulai; 1951
- Died: October 2, 2016 (aged 64–65)
- Occupation(s): Philanthropist, physician

David Fuseini Abdulai (c. 1951 – 2 October 2016), also called Dr. Choggu or Dr. Gurugu, was a philanthropist, physician and founder of the Shekinnah clinic in Tamale, Ghana. He was the fifth recipient of the Martin Luther King Jr Award, conferred on him by the US Embassy in Ghana in 2012. His father was called Abdul Kaleem Yidantogma. The mother of Dr. Choggu was called Amishetu Yahaya, a semi beggar.

On October 7, 2023, a statue was unveiled to honour him by the chiefs and people of Tamale. The Choggu Round About was renamed as Dr. Choggu Roundabout.
