= Yasmin Modassir =

Indian academician, scientist and Principal

Yasmin Modassir (1953 – October 5, 2016) was an Indian academician, scientist and former principal at Dhempe College of Arts and Science, a college affiliated to the Goa University, Miramar, Goa.

== Biography ==
Born in Uttar Pradesh, she received her doctorate degree in 1980 from Aligarh Muslim University. She was involved in scientific research in Zoology and fisheries from 1975 in a career spanning 39 years. She was the recipient of Senior Research Fellowship and Post-Doctoral Fellowship of Council of Scientific and Industrial Research (CSIR) New Delhi. She joined Dhempe College of Arts and Science as a faculty member in 1981, becoming Head of the Department of Zoology in 1996. She became Chair of Vice-Principal in 2003, Principal in 2006 and retired in September 2016.

== Areas of research ==
Modassir's research included limnology, culture of molluscs; conservation strategies for mangrove ecosystems; zooplankton of saltpans; effects of pollutants on marine fauna.

== Professional affiliations ==
She was a founder member of All Goa Association of Zoologists, and a life member of the Mangrove Society of India, the Society of Biosciences, the Academy of Sciences for Animal Welfare and the National Environmental Science Academy (Goa chapter).

== Honours ==
- "Environmentalist of the Year" Award 2002 for outstanding contribution in the field of Environmental Biology by the International Board of Awards of National Environmental Science Academy, India.
- Conferred fellowship of the Academy of Sciences, Engineering and Technology (F.ASET) for outstanding contribution for furthering Knowledge systems in service of the society to improve the quality of life of people – July, 2007.
- Conferred fellowship by Society of Biosciences for outstanding contribution in biological science in 1995.

== Publications ==
=== Research papers ===
- Modassir, Y. and Ansari Azra (2011). Plankton community of the hypersaline Salterns of Goa, India. Biological Forum – An International Journal, 3 (1): 78-81
- Modassir, Y. (2011). Fish species diversity and its potential for angling fishing in Goa – An overview. Indian Journal of Applied and Pure Biology, 26 (2) 291-304
- Modassir Y. and Chatterji, A (2011). Oxygen consumption in juveniles of tiger shrimp, (Penaeus monodon Fabricius) under different environmental conditions. Indian Journal of Applied and Pure Biology, 26(2):327–338.
- Modassir, Y. and Chatterji, A. (2011). Growth of tiger prawn, Penaeus monodon in a re-circulating seawater system. Journal of Coastal Environment, 2 (2)
- Modassir, Y. et al., (2013), Geochemical Assessment of Groundwater Quality in Mhadei River Watershed, Goa, India. International Journal of Theoretical and Applied Science (Accepted)
