= Fausto Cayambe =

Ecuadorian politician (1976–2016)

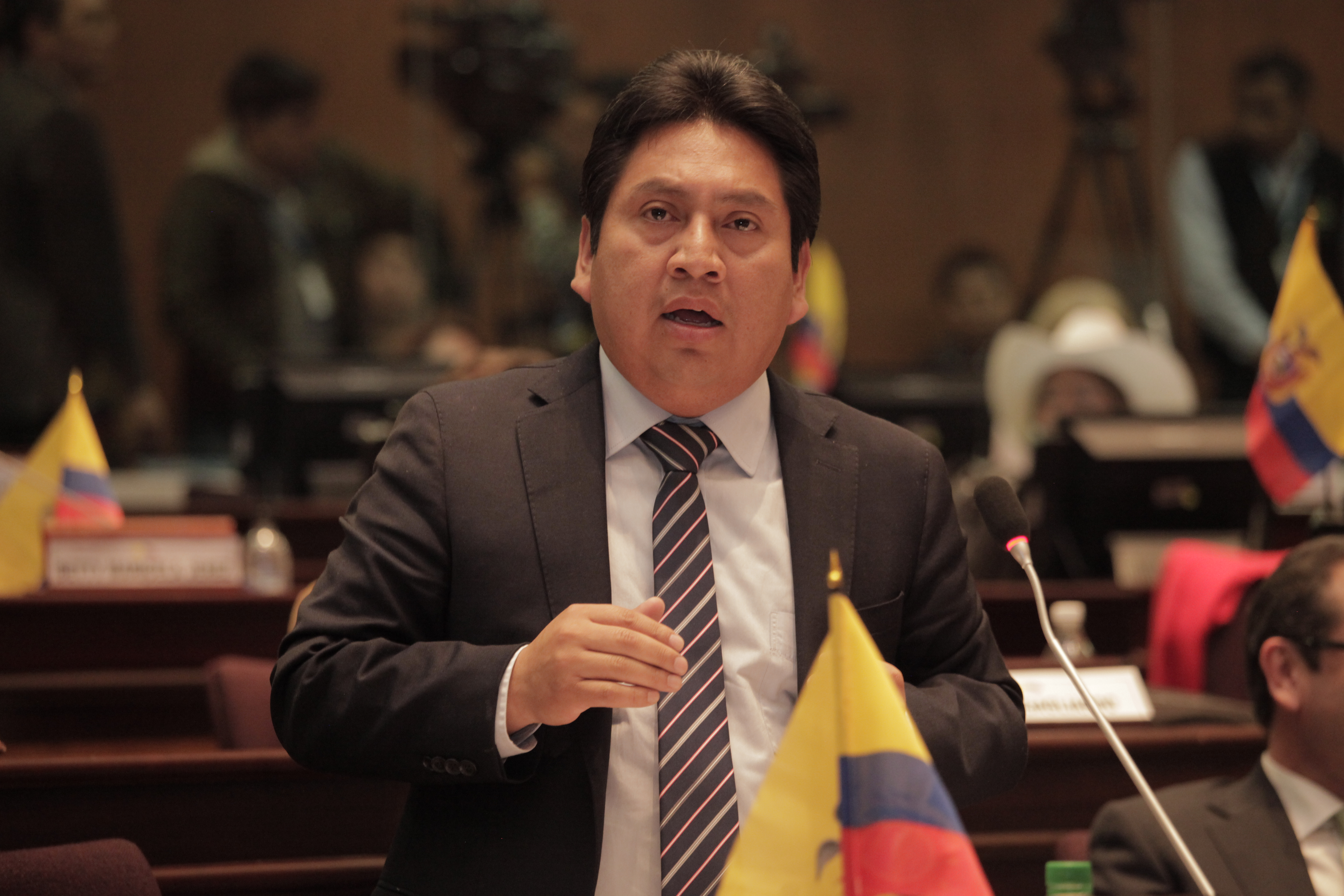

Member of the Ecuadorian National Assembly for Pichincha Province (Constituency 2)
- In office May 14, 2013 – October 30, 2016

Personal details
- Born: Fausto Heriberto Cayambe Tipan; June 24, 1976; Quito, Ecuador
- Died: October 30, 2016 (aged 40); Quito, Ecuador
- Political party: PAIS Alliance
- Occupation: Doctor in Jurisprudence
- Website: www.asambleanacional.gob.ec/es/blogs/fausto-cayambe

Fausto Heriberto Cayambe Tipan (June 24, 1976 – October 30, 2016) was an Ecuadorian politician.
