= Inez Fischer-Credo =

Canadian equestrian (1928–2016)

Personal information
- Nationality: Canadian
- Born: 10 September 1928 Mexico City, Mexico
- Died: 2 October 2016 (aged 88) Tucson, Arizona, U.S.

Sport
- Sport: Equestrian
Medal record
Equestrian
Representing Canada
Pan American Games
Bronze medal – third place	1967 Winnipeg	Team dressage

Inez Ursula Fischer-Credo (10 September 1928 – 2 October 2016) was a Canadian equestrian. She was born in Mexico City. She competed at the 1964 Summer Olympics in Tokyo, and at the 1968 Summer Olympics in Mexico City. Fischer-Credo died in Tucson, Arizona on 2 October 2016, at the age of 88.
