= Mayer Hersh =

Concentration camp survivor (1926–2016)

- Born: Herszkowicz; 31 August 1926; Sieradz, Poland
- Died: 8 October 2016 (aged 90); Prestwich, Greater Manchester, England
- Known for: Auschwitz concentration camp survivor
- Parents: Isaac Herszkowicz (father); Riwka Szczukowska (mother)

Mayer Hersh MBE (31 August 1926 – 8 October 2016) was a Polish Jew who survived the Auschwitz concentration camp. Born in Sieradz to a family of six siblings, only Mayer and his brother Jakob survived. his father, mother and three other siblings were murdered in Chełmno extermination camp.

After World War II, Hersh lived in Manchester, England. He was awarded an MBE in the 2013 New Year Honours for services to Holocaust education.

Mayer died on 8 October 2016, at the age of 90.

== See also ==
- List of victims and survivors of Auschwitz
