= Jerzy Szymczyk =

Polish volleyball player (1942–2016)

Personal information
- Nationality: Polish
- Born: 30 September 1942; Stara Gazomia, Poland
- Died: 23 October 2016 (aged 74); Kraków, Poland

Sport
- Sport: Volleyball

Jerzy Szymczyk (30 September 1942 – 23 October 2016) was a Polish volleyball player. He competed in the men's tournament at the 1968 Summer Olympics.
