= Gordon Stewart (cricketer) =

Australian cricketer

Personal information
- Born: 16 June 1906; Sydney, Australia
- Died: 21 October 1984 (aged 78); Katoomba, New South Wales, Australia
- Source: ESPNcricinfo, 2 February 2017

Gordon Stewart (16 June 1906 – 21 October 1984) was an Australian cricketer. He played ten first-class matches for New South Wales between 1930/31 and 1932/33.

== See also ==
- List of New South Wales representative cricketers
