= Richard K. Saxer =

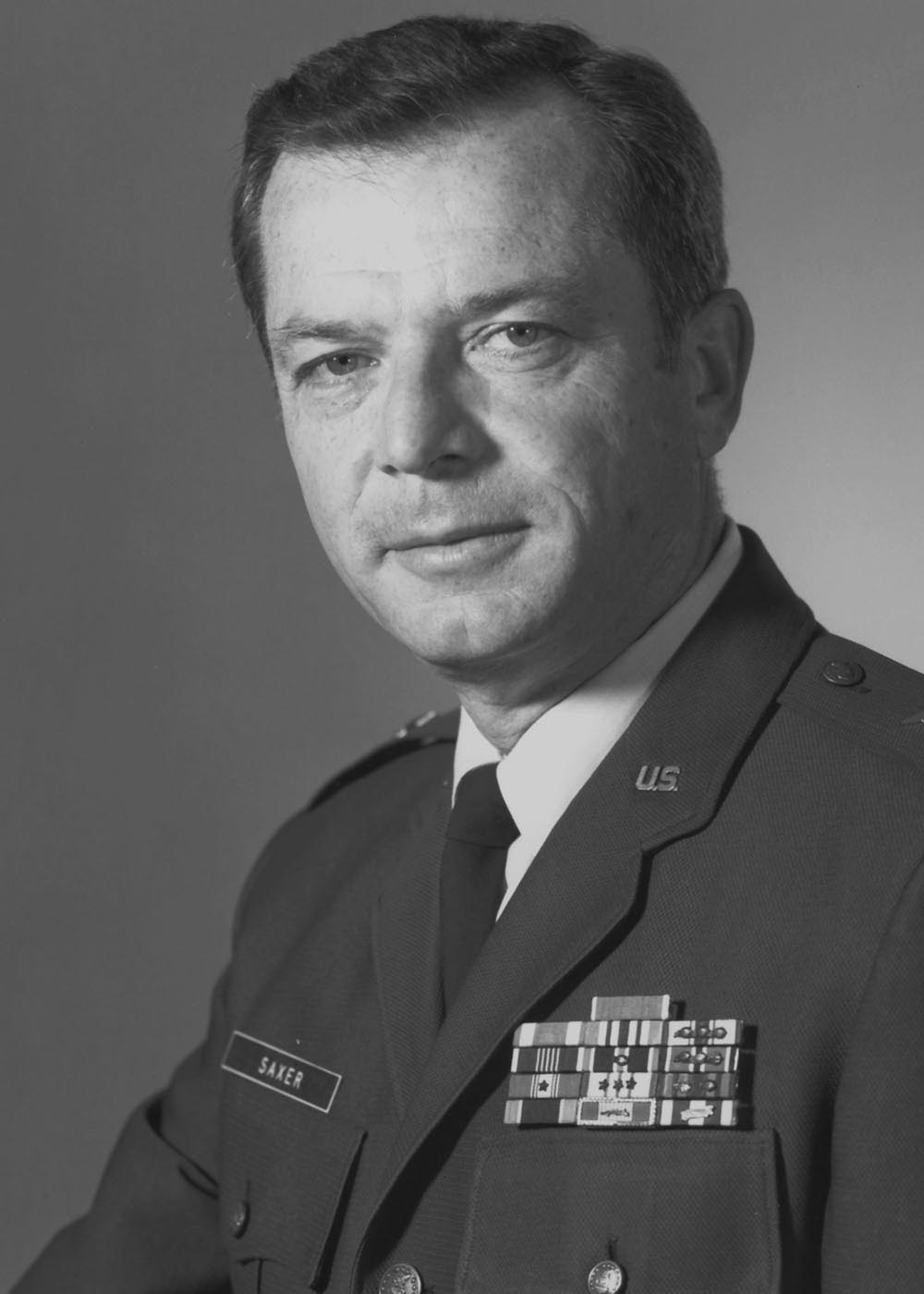
- Born: August 31, 1928; Toledo, Ohio, U.S.
- Died: October 18, 2016 (aged 88); Springdale, Ohio, U.S.
- Military career
- Allegiance: United States of America
- Branch: United States Air Force
- Service years: 1952–1985
- Rank: Lieutenant General
- Awards: Defense Distinguished Service Medal, Distinguished Service Medal, Defense Superior Service Medal, Legion of Merit, Defense Meritorious Service Medal, Meritorious Service Medal, Joint Service Commendation Medal, Air Force Commendation Medal with three oak leaf clusters, Army Commendation Medal, Air Force Outstanding Unit Award Ribbon with oak leaf cluster, Air Force Organizational Excellence Award Ribbon with two oak leaf clusters, National Defense Service Medal with service star, Vietnam Service Medal with three service stars, Air Force Longevity Service Award Ribbon with seven oak leaf clusters, Small Arms Expert Marksmanship Ribbon, Republic of Vietnam Gallantry Cross with palm, Republic of Vietnam Campaign Medal

Richard Karl Saxer (August 31, 1928 – October 18, 2016) was a lieutenant general in the United States Air Force who served as director, Defense Nuclear Agency in Washington, D.C.

Saxer was born in 1928, in Toledo, Ohio, where he graduated from Thomas A. DeVilbiss High School in 1946. He attended Bowling Green State University, from 1946 through 1948, and then entered the U.S. Naval Academy, Annapolis, Maryland, graduating in 1952. He earned a master's degree in aeromechanics from the Air Force Institute of Technology, Wright-Patterson Air Force Base, Ohio, in 1957 and a doctor of philosophy (Ph.D.) in metallurgical engineering from Ohio State University, in 1962. He graduated from the Armed Forces Staff College in Norfolk, Virginia, in 1966, completed the Air War College seminar program in 1969 and graduated from the Industrial College of the Armed Forces at Fort Lesley J. McNair in Washington, D.C., in 1971. Saxer is also a 1973 graduate of the University of Pittsburgh's Management Program for Executives.

Following graduation from the Naval Academy, Saxer was commissioned a second lieutenant in the U.S. Air Force. He completed special weapons training with the 1090th Special Reporting Group, Sandia Base, N.M., in April 1953, and then worked as an electronics officer and a mechanical officer with the 4th Tactical Support Squadron, Tactical Air Command, at Sandia Base.

From March 1954 until August 1955, Saxer was assigned to the Strategic Air Command's 6th Aviation Depot Squadron, in French Morocco, as an electronics officer; mechanical officer; and special weapons assembly section supervisor.

After graduation from the Air Force Institute of Technology in August 1957, Saxer was a project engineer in the Mechanical Equipment Branch of the Air Force Special Weapons Center's Development Directorate at Kirtland Air Force Base. There he designed, tested and developed an integrated nuclear weapons loading system for the Tactical Air Command. In January 1959 he was reassigned within the directorate as a project officer in the Nuclear Safety Division, where he conducted nuclear safety studies of various Air Force weapon systems.

He attended Ohio State University, from June 1960 to June 1962, and was then assigned to the department of engineering mechanics at the Air Force Institute of Technology. While there, Saxer developed the graduate materials engineering program. After graduation from the Armed Forces Staff College in 1966, he transferred to the engineering mechanics department at the U.S. Air Force Academy in Colorado Springs, where he served as an associate professor and deputy department head. During his academy tenure he was directed to Southeast Asia on several occasions to solve urgent structure and materials problems.

Saxer entered the Industrial College of the Armed Forces in June 1970. After graduation he was assigned to Wright-Patterson Air Force Base as commander/director of the Air Force Materials Laboratory. As commander he formulated and directed composite materials programs which would provide cost and weight savings in the production of B-1s, F-15s, F-16s and A-10s. Additionally, the manufacturing methods program which he directed was restructured to emphasize cost-reduction processes in future Air Force aircraft weapon systems procurements.

In July 1974 he was selected as deputy for re-entry systems at the Space and Missile Systems Organization, Los Angeles Air Force Station. During this assignment Saxer formulated various re-entry systems programs designed to provide new ballistic and maneuvering re-entry vehicle options for MX and Trident weapons systems. In April 1977 he returned to Wright-Patterson Air Force Base as deputy for aeronautical equipment, Aeronautical Systems Division. His responsibilities included managing the Electronic Warfare, Reconnaissance Strike, TR-1, Life Support, Support Equipment, and Avionics and Aircraft Accessories Program Offices. In April 1980 he became the deputy for tactical systems at Aeronautical Systems Division. His responsibilities included F-15, A-10, Fighter Attack, Maverick and Remotely Piloted Vehicles Program Offices. From June 1981 to February 1983, Saxer was vice commander of the Aeronautical Systems Division. He was then assigned to the Defense Nuclear Agency as deputy director (operations and administration). He assumed position at the Defense Nuclear Agency in August 1983.

His military decorations and awards include the Defense Distinguished Service Medal, Distinguished Service Medal, Defense Superior Service Medal, Legion of Merit, Defense Meritorious Service Medal, Meritorious Service Medal, Joint Service Commendation Medal, Air Force Commendation Medal with three oak leaf clusters, Army Commendation Medal, Air Force Outstanding Unit Award Ribbon with oak leaf cluster, Air Force Organizational Excellence Award Ribbon with two oak leaf clusters, National Defense Service Medal with service star, Vietnam Service Medal with three service stars, Air Force Longevity Service Award Ribbon with seven oak leaf clusters, Small Arms Expert Marksmanship Ribbon, Republic of Vietnam Gallantry Cross with palm and Republic of Vietnam Campaign Medal. He also wears the Master Missile Badge. In 1979 Saxer was awarded the Air Force Association's Distinguished Award for Systems Management.

Saxer is the author and co-author of more than 40 technical publications. He was promoted to lieutenant general August 1, 1983, and retired on July 1, 1985.
