= Bill Duckworth (footballer, born 1918) =

Australian rules footballer

- Duckworth in August 2014

Personal information
- Full name: Bill Duckworth
- Born: 10 June 1918
- Died: 24 October 2016 (aged 98)
- Original team: Parkside
- Height: 183 cm (6 ft 0 in)
- Weight: 73 kg (161 lb)

Playing career^{1}
| Years | Club | Games (Goals) |
| 1943–44 | Collingwood | 2 (2) |
- ^{1} Playing statistics correct to the end of 1944.

Bill Duckworth (10 June 1918 – 24 October 2016) was an Australian rules footballer who played with Collingwood in the Victorian Football League (VFL).
