= Robert Weber (cartoonist) =

American cartoonist

Robert Maxwell Weber (April 22, 1924 – October 20, 2016) was an American cartoonist, known for over 1,400 cartoons that appeared in The New Yorker from 1962 to 2007. Born in Los Angeles, he served in the Coast Guard during World War II and later studied at the Pratt Institute and Art Students League of New York. He worked as a fashion illustrator for Harper's Bazaar and other magazines before becoming a cartoonist. He died in Branford, Connecticut, at the age of 92.
