= Pero Simić =

Bosnian Serb journalist and historian (1946-2016)

Pero Simić (2 July 1946 – 11 October 2016) was a Bosnian Serb journalist and historian. He is most notable for authoring the first complete political biography of Josip Broz Tito, which has been published in all languages of the former Yugoslavia, in seven editions with a circulation of 58,500 copies, under the titles Tito, secret of the century and Tito the phenomenon of the century. The book has been translated into Polish and German and will soon be published in Bulgarian and other world languages.

== Biography ==
Born in Skočić near Zvornik, PR Bosnia-Herzegovina, FPR Yugoslavia. He finished primary school in Skočić and Kozluk near Zvornik, then went to high school in Zvornik, Lukavac and Loznica. He moved to Belgrade for post-secondary education, graduating from the University of Belgrade's School of Economics.

== Politics ==
Simić was president of the Youth Organization of Serbia from 1971-73. In those years, in his public speeches he was saying that "dissatisfaction of the youth should not be suppressed", that "one does not inherit future, but builds it" that "there is no taboo for us", that "our task to critically think", that "nothing can be achieved with bludgeon", that "Yugoslavia has an unrealistic picture of itself", that "nationalism is a real force in society." And that "freedom can not exist without democracy" in Yugoslav society, that "closure leads to primitivism", that "a country can not prosper if the power is in the hands of one man."

In October 1972, during several days of Tito's conversation with the Serbian leadership, Simić did not support the politics of the Yugoslav president, but rather those of Serbian liberal leader Marko Nikezić. One month after this meeting, Simić told two local youth officials that "no one is sinless, not even comrade Tito."

Simić's companions reported these comments to the Minister of the Municipal Committee of League of Communists, secretary of the Committee to the new leadership of the League of Communists of Serbia. In February 1972, the secretariat of Central Committee of the League of Communists of Serbia formed on the occasion of this statement a party committee which a month later forced Simić to resign from all political positions.

In 1976, charge with "undermining our system and the unity of state and political leadership of Serbia and Yugoslavia", Simić was brought to the interrogation for several days to the central Serbian State Security Service in Kneza Milosa 30, Belgrade, without written decision.

== Journalism ==
Simić worked in Vecernje Novosti from 1973-79 in the editorial office writing short newspaper articles on environmental protection. At the end of the 1979 he was given the opportunity to report on the traditional meeting of economists of Yugoslavia in Opatija. He reported that Yugoslavia was in the "biggest balance of payments crisis" in its history, and that, in the first eight months of the year, "negative balance of trade with foreign countries was greater than in the whole previous year", that the participation of Yugoslavia in world exports in the last eight years has fallen from 0.54 to 0.45 percent, while its share in world imports "has fallen from 0.93 to 0.79 percent". He added that "current account deficit of the country in 1979 will reach unprecedented amount of three billion dollars", that the state’s stimulation of exports had increased by 40 percent and that the Yugoslav exports declined and "covers only 47 percent of imports".

By order of the Federal Secretary for Information Ismail Bajra, due to this reporting he was prohibited from writing about economic and political issues and sent back to editorial work. Six years later, in 1985, he was allowed to write economic and political articles and comments. He has published over 300 articles dealing with controversial pages of the recent history of Serbia and Yugoslavia.

Besides Vecernje Novosti, his reports have been published in Mladost, Rad, Borba, Duga, Intervju, NIN, and Danas. From November 1998 to March 2000, he was the chief editor of Vecernje Novosti. The government of the Federal Republic of Yugoslavia nationalized Novosti''s publishing company on 2 March 2000, so the editorial policy of Vecernje Novosti would adjust to the wishes of the government at that time. From 5 October 2000 until 1 January 2008, he worked as a journalist-associate at the newspaper.

== Works ==
Simić has published 16 publicist and historiographic books, including:

- Uncertain Past
- Chains of dogma, 1988.
- When Tito, How Tito, Why Tito, 1989.
- Tito agent of the Comintern, 1990.
- Forgiveness with no mercy (co-authored with Jovan Kesar), 1990.
- Inside the bloody circle - Tito and the breakup of Yugoslavia, 1993. (Second revised edition of "The collapse of Tito's Empire", 1999).
- Fires and flood - in the whirl of family Serboland (co-authored with Dejan Lukic), 2001.
- Saint and Fog, 2005.
- Crucified Kosovo, 2006.
- Temptations of the Serbian elite, 2006.
- Tito, secret of the century, 2009.
- Tito's Diary, 2009.
- Tito, strictly confidential – archive documents (co-authored with Zvonimir Despot), 2010.
- Period of youth (co-authored with Djoko Stojicic and Miroslav Markovic), 2010.

Croatian and Slovenian historians and journalists have called Simić "the best connoisseur of Tito in the world"
