= Frank Peers =

Canadian political scientist and historian

Frank Wayne Peers (January 18, 1918 – October 2016) was a Canadian political scientist and historian. He is a former director of information programming at the Canadian Broadcasting Corporation, who later taught at the University of Toronto in the Department of Political Economy. He is the author of two books and many articles about the politics of broadcasting in Canada.

== Early life and education ==
Peers was born in Alsask, Saskatchewan. He received his Bachelor of Arts in 1936 and a Bachelor of Education in 1943 from the University of Alberta (Mount Royal College). In 1948, he received his Masters of Arts and then a Doctorate degree from the University of Toronto in 1966.

== Career ==
Peers worked at the Canadian Broadcasting Corporation, where he served as the head of Public Affairs, and then Director of Information Programming. In 1954 he was a delegate to the Commonwealth Conference in Lahore, Pakistan.

In 1963 he began teaching Canadian politics in what was then the Department of Political Economy, at the University of Toronto. He authored two studies, The Politics of Canadian Broadcasting, 1920-1951 (UTP 1969) and The Public Eye: Television and the Politics of Canadian Broadcasting, 1952-1968 (UTP 1979), as well as articles in various journals.

In the late 1970s, he also co-edited the Canadian Journal of Political Science.

Peers retired from his academic post in 1983. He died in Toronto in October 2016 at the age of 98.

== Philanthropy ==
After his retirement, Peers endowed several graduate scholarships named for professors serving before and during his own years in the department, including the Alexander Brady/MacGregor Dawson Scholarships, the Peter Russell OGS Scholarship, the Ted Hodgetts OGS Scholarship, the Paul Fox OGS Scholarship, the Stefan Dupré OGS Scholarship, the Frank Peers OGS Scholarship and Graduate Fellowship, the Ken Bryden Scholarship in Canadian Government and Politics, the Tom Easterbrook Graduate Scholarship in Mass Media, and the A.W. Johnson Graduate Scholarship in Canadian Government and Public Administration.

With Professor Peter Russell, Peers initiated the creation of the C.B. Macpherson Dissertation Fellowships. He also endowed an undergraduate scholarship at the Bonham Centre for Sexual Diversity Studies honouring the retirement of David Rayside.

== Honours ==
In 2014, the Graduate Student Space for Political Science students on the third floor of Sidney Smith Hall, was named the Frank Peers Room in his honour.
