= Ed McHugh =

American soccer player

Personal information
- Full name: Edward Joseph McHugh, Jr.
- Date of birth: June 9, 1930
- Place of birth: St. Louis, Missouri, United States
- Date of death: October 2, 2016 (aged 86)

Senior career*
| Years | Team | Apps | (Gls) |
- St. Louis Simpkins-Ford

International career
| 1952 | United States | 1 | (0) |
- * Club domestic league appearances and goals

Ed "Ebby" McHugh (June 9, 1930 – October 2, 2016) was a U.S. soccer player who was a member of the 1952 Summer Olympics. He also played for St. Louis Simpkins-Ford in the St. Louis Major League. On October 1, 1996, he was inducted into the St. Louis Soccer Hall of Fame.
