= Stanley Leavy =

American psychoanalyst (1915–2016)

Stanley Arnold Leavy
- Born: August 11, 1915; New York, United States
- Died: October 31, 2016 (aged 101); Newton, Massachusetts, United States
- Occupation: psychoanalyst
- Spouse: Margaret H. Russell (1918-2007)

Stanley Arnold Leavy (August 11, 1915 – October 31, 2016) was an American psychoanalyst. He was an alumnus of Yale University and the University of Rochester. He was a conscientious objector in World War II. He died at the age of 101 on October 31, 2016, in Newton, Massachusetts. He is buried at Grove Street Cemetery in New Haven, Connecticut.

== Publications ==
- The Psychoanalytic Dialogue (1987) ISBN 9780300040371
- In the Image of God: A Psychoanalyst's View (1997) ISBN 9780881632767
