= Turki bin Saud Al Kabeer =

Saudi royal (executed 2016)

Turki bin Saud bin Turki bin Saud Al Kabeer
- تركي بن سعود الكبير
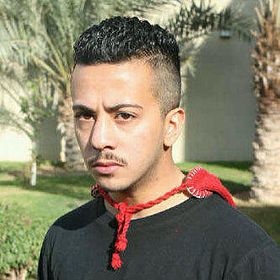
- Born: 1991; Saudi Arabia
- Died: 18 October 2016 (aged 24–25); Riyadh, Saudi Arabia
- Cause of death: Execution by beheading
- Resting place: Saudi Arabia

Turki bin Saud Al Kabeer (Arabic: تركي بن سعود الكبير) was a Saudi prince. He was a great-grandson of Prince Saud Al Kabeer, who was a cousin and brother-in-law of King Abdulaziz (r. 1932–1953). Prince Saud was a prominent figure in the majlis of internal advisers to King Abdulaziz.

Al Kabeer's execution for murder was announced by Saudi state media on 18 October 2016. He was the first member of the Saudi royal family to be executed since the execution of 19 year old Mishaal bint Fahd bin Mohammed Al Saud in 1977.

== Crime and punishment ==
Al Kabeer pleaded guilty to the murder of Adel bin Suleiman bin Abdulkareem Al Muhaimeed, whom he shot to death in 2012. The victim was "a friend" of the shooter who also injured other people in a brawl in the desert outside Riyadh. After the victim's family refused offers of diyah, Al Kabeer was executed by beheading in October 2016. It was the 134th execution of 2016 in Saudi Arabia.

== Execution ==
His friends and family met Al Kabeer a few hours before the execution. Waiting for the execution, Al Kabeer spent his time praying and reading the Quran until the Fajr prayer. At about 7:00 am, the prison warden took him to the place where the prince was to write his last will. After he performed ablution, at 11:00 am, he was taken to the mosque. During the final hour before execution, Al Kabeer's father tried to convince the victim's father to forgive him and to accept diyah. However, the victim's father declined the diya offer and refused to forgive his son's killer. Thus, the execution proceeded immediately after Asr prayer at 4:13 pm.

Al Kabeer's execution started significant discussion on Saudi social media, with commentators from around the country commending the Saudi authorities' decision to treat him like any other Saudi citizen.

== See also ==
- Capital punishment in Saudi Arabia
