= Gurcharan Virk =

Gurcharan Singh
- Born: Faridkot district
- Died: 11 October 2016 (aged 47–48)
- Occupation(s): Writer, director, producer

Gurcharan Virk (c. 1968 – 11 October 2016) was a Punjabi writer, director, lyricist and producer. He started his career in 1983 by recording a song. Some of the movies on which he worked as associate director include, Marhi Da Deeva and Udeekan Saun Diyan. He directed the television films of Fauji Di Family, Bapu Di Pension, Police Naaka, Attro Diyan Chugliyan, Maawan De Dil, Sardaari and Bapu Da Viah. He directed serials, commercials, video albums, documentaries and films.

== Early life ==
Virk was born in Faridkot district of the Indian state of Punjab.

== Career ==
Gurcharan Virk started his career in the film industry during the mid-1980s. He participated in the uplift of the Punjabi music industry. He helped introduce new talent in the industry including, Sukhwinder, Pargat Bhagu, Dilshad Akhtar and Manjit Roupowalia.

Virk worked with music brands such as T-series, CMC, Peritone, Fineton, Anmol and more. Virk worked as a writer for 15 Punjabi films, 2 Hindi films, 3 T.V. Serials, and 13 Telefilms. His movie Madi Da Diva, was given the National Award for Best Punjabi Film in 1990.

Documentaries made by him include, Milkfed, Mother Dairy, Seva Te Simran and Parivartan. Commercials for K Humate, Dev Bhumi Ispat, Punjab State Lottery, Food Grain Corporation, Meethe Maine Kush Meetha Ho Jaye and Har Ik Friend Jaruri Hota Hai are among his prominent.

Virk's contribution to TV serials include Rishty, Kachi Kandh and Vaapsi still air. He died of a heart attack in Chandigarh on 11 October 2016, aged 48.

== Cinematic style ==
Film Focus is a company that was owned by Gurcharan Virk. The company promotes fresh talent and produces varied types of films, documentaries, videos, commercials, television serials, etc. It has been registered with Indian Motion Pictures Producer Association Mumbai.
