= Ruben Hovsepyan =

Armenian novelist, translator and editor (1939–2016)

- Ռուբեն Հովսեփյան
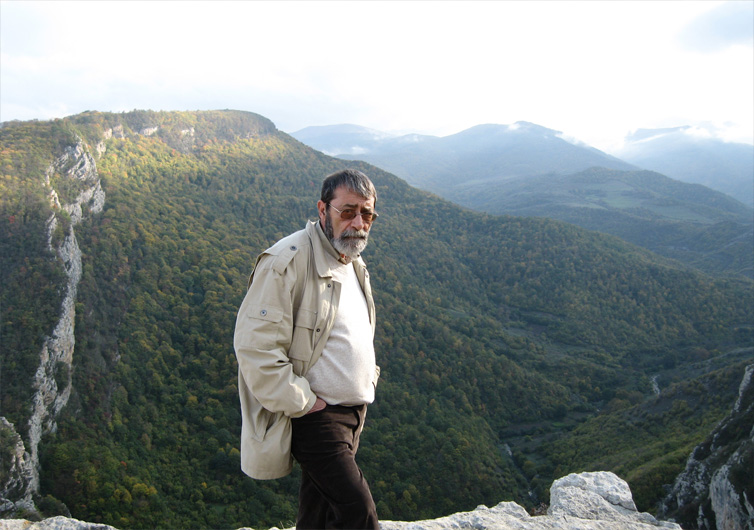
- Hovsepyan in 2005

Member of the National Assembly
- In office 2000–2007

Personal details
- Born: 5 May 1939 Yerevan, Armenian SSR
- Died: 27 October 2016 (aged 77)
- Party: Armenian Revolutionary Federation
- Education: Yerevan State University
- Occupation: politician
- Profession: novelist, translator, editor

Ruben Hovsepyan (Armenian: Ռուբեն Հովսեփյան; 5 May 1939 – 27 October 2016) was an Armenian novelist, translator and editor who became politically active in the 1990s, and, as member of the Armenian Revolutionary Federation, served in the National Assembly from 2000 to 2007. He was also a member of the Writers' Union of Armenia (1968).

Born in Yerevan on 5 May 1939, he studied geology at Yerevan State University, and graduated in 1962. He became the editor-in-chief of Nairi Publishing House in 1982 and left in 1987, assuming the post of secretary of the Writers Union of Armenia in 1988. Hovsepyan returned to editing for the magazine Nork in 1989, a position he held until his death in 2016 at the age of 77.

Hovsepyan published approximately a dozen works in his literary career, which have been translated into other languages. He was also a translator of Leo Tolstoy's writings, and best known for a translation of One Hundred Years of Solitude by Gabriel García Márquez. Hovsepyan was named a Honored Worker of Culture by the Armenian government in 2014.

== Works ==
- Ordan karmir. Sovetakan grol, Erevan, 1980 (Die karminrote Schildlaus. Verlag Volk und Welt, Berlin, 1986)
