= Imre Józsa =

Hungarian actor and voice actor (1954–2016)

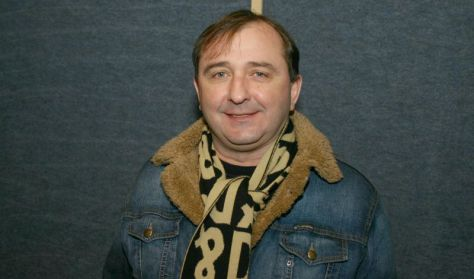
- Born: 18 March 1954; Budapest, Hungary
- Died: 30 October 2016 (aged 62); Budapest, Hungary
- Occupations: Actor; voice actor
- Years active: 1978–2016
- Spouses: Zsuzsa Málnai (div.); Judit Kocsis (div.); Dóra Létay (div.)
- Children: 2
- Awards: Jászai Mari Prize

Imre Józsa (18 March 1954 – 30 October 2016) was a Hungarian actor and voice actor. He was awarded numerous prizes such as Jászai Mari-Prize.

== Early life and education ==
Józsa was born 18 March 1954 in Budapest.

He completed his secondary school studies as a precision mechanics technician, and worked for one year at the Hungarian Optical Works in this position. He graduated from the Academy of Theatre and Film Arts in 1978 in the same class as Zoltán Várkonyi.

== Career ==
He was a member of the József Attila Theatre between 1978 and 2012 and he worked as a freelance actor from 2012 until his death. He did extensive work as a voice actor.

== Personal life ==
He married Zsuzsa Málnai, and had a daughter, Borbála, in 1980. They divorced in 1984, and their daughter stayed with her mother, with whom they had two grandchildren, Samu and Brúnó. Józsa then married Judit Kocsis, then he married Dóra Létay as his third wife, with whom he had a second daughter, Emma, but this marriage also ended in divorce.

== Death and legacy ==
Józsa died 30 October 2016 in Budapest at the age of 62 after a prolonged illness.

He was laid to rest on November 18, 2016, at the Farkasréti Cemetery in Budapest. His funeral was attended by Károly Nemcsák, Árpád Besenczi, Gábor Vass, Éva Vándor, Judit Hernádi, Róbert Koltai, László Szacsvay, Judit Schell, András Kern, Dóra Létay, Dezső Straub, Tamás Böröndi, Béla Szerednyey, Kristóf Németh, Zsuzsa Nyertes, Steve Hajdu, Győző Mihályi, Barnabás Szabó Sipos.

In 2017, the József Attila Theatre established an award in his memory, which can be received by a member of the company at the end of each season.
