= Current Medical Research and Opinion =

- Discipline: Medicine
- Language: English
- Edited by: Dimitri P. Mikhailidis

Publication details
- History: 1972-present
- Publisher: Taylor and Francis Group
- Frequency: Monthly
- Open access: Hybrid
- Impact factor: 2.3 (2022)

Standard abbreviations
- ISO 4: Curr. Med. Res. Opin.

Indexing
- CODEN: CMROCX
- ISSN: 0300-7995 (print); 1473-4877 (web)
- OCLC no.: 1778119

Links
- Journal homepage; Online access; Online archive

Current Medical Research and Opinion is a peer-reviewed medical journal established in 1972. It is published monthly by Taylor and Francis Group.

== Abstracting and indexing ==
The journal is abstracted and indexed by MEDLINE/PubMed, EMBASE/Excerpta Medica, Current Contents/Clinical Medicine, Science Citation Index, CAB Abstracts, PASCAL, and PsycINFO. According to Current Medical Research and Opinion, the journal's 2022 impact factor is 2.3.
