= Richard Fry =

British Army officer (1924–2016)

Captain Richard Noel Fry, MC, Croix de Guerre (22 May 1924 – 11 October 2016) was a British Army officer who was awarded the Military Cross for gallantry whilst serving with the 8th (Midlands) Parachute Battalion in the Battle for Normandy, during the Second World War. He later became a Schoolmaster at Christ's Hospital, Horsham, Sussex. He was appointed a Chevalier of the Legion d'honneur in July 2016.

Fry was born at Maldon, Essex and was educated at St Albans School, Hertfordshire. He was granted an Emergency Commission in the Royal Armoured Corps in July 1943. He later volunteered to serve with the airborne forces and was posted to 8th (Midlands) Parachute Battalion, 3rd Parachute Brigade, part of the 6th Airborne Division.

On D-Day, 6 June 1944, Fry as platoon commander No 3 platoon Letter A Company landed near the Bois de Bavent, north-east of Caen before the main assault on the Normandy beaches began. Fry and his platoon moved towards Le Mesnil and were engaged in setting ambushes for German tanks and vehicles; resulting in major disruption to the enemy. His platoon was then deployed to hold the village of Le Mesnil. On 16 June his platoon came under repeated heavy attacks at Le Mesnil from enemy mortar, shelling, machine gunfire and snipers over a period of eight hours. An extract from the citation for the award of the Military Cross to Fry reads: " that it was due to his courage and leadership that they had held the position." He was later wounded in Normandy. He served in the Ardennes: Battle of the Bulge and in Operation Varsity: the airborne operation over the River Rhine. After the Second World War he served in Palestine during the Palestine Emergency and left the army in 1948.

Fry farmed in Somerset in 1949. He then joined the Metropolitan Police and served with Special Branch. He took a degree in Zoology at Birkbeck, University of London and was a Schoolmaster at Christ's Hospital, Horsham, Sussex, from 1957 to 1989. He retired to Lyme Regis, Dorset.

In July 2016, Fry was appointed a Chevalier of the Legion d'honneur for his role in the Liberation of France in the Second World War.

He married Jeannie Brunskill-Davies in 1952 with whom he was to have a son and daughter.

Captain Richard Fry MC, Croix de Guerre died on 11 October 2016 aged 92.
