= Pierre Vallon =

French businessman and politician

- Born: 10 November 1927
- Died: 24 October 2016 (aged 88)
- Occupation(s): Businessman, politician

Pierre Vallon (10 November 1927 – 24 October 2016) was a French businessman and politician. He was an heir to Vallon et Compagnie, a silk company based in La Croix-Rousse, Lyon. He served as a member of the French Senate from 1974 to 1995.
