= Safa Haeri =

- Died: Paris, France
- Occupation: Journalist

Safa Haeri (Persian: صفا حائری; c. 1937 – October 25, 2016) was an Iranian-born journalist living in France, from where he created the first independent and private Iranian internet news service, Iran Press Service.

He covered most international events in the 1960s and 1970s, including the Vietnam and Arab-Israeli wars, major international summits as well as the Islamic Revolution of 1979 for Agence France-Presse and some other French media and later worked for The Independent of London and L'Express magazine in Paris. He worked as diplomatic reporter for leading Iranian newspapers like Keyhan, Keyhan International, then Etela'at, Journal de Tehran, the French-language daily published by the Etela'at news group, before joining Ayandegan in charge of diplomatic service.

He died at the age of 79 in 2016 in Paris.
