= Gordon Stewart (epidemiologist) =

Scottish public health physician

Gordon Stewart MD, FRCP, FRCPath, FFPHM, FRSS
- Born: Gordon Thallon Stewart; February 5, 1919; Paisley, Renfrewshire, Scotland
- Died: October 10, 2016 (aged 97)
- Education: University of Glasgow; University of Liverpool
- Known for: Criticism of the pertussis vaccine
- Medical career
- Profession: Epidemiologist
- Field: Public health
- Institutions: University of Glasgow
- Research: Epidemiology

Gordon Thallon Stewart (5 February 1919 – 10 October 2016) was a Scottish epidemiologist and public health physician who served as the Henry Mechan Professor of Public Health at the University of Glasgow from 1972 to 1984.

== Early life and education ==
Stewart was born on 5 February 1919 in Paisley, Renfrewshire, Scotland. He graduated from the University of Glasgow in 1939 with a BSc degree. He later received an MB, ChB, and MD from the University of Glasgow in 1942, 1942, and 1949, respectively; he also received a diploma in tropical medicine and hygiene from the University of Liverpool in 1948.

== Career ==
Stewart served as a surgeon-lieutenant in the Royal Navy from 1943 to 1946. He then held several hospital appointments, including senior registrar and tutor at the Wright-Fleming Institute at St Mary's Hospital, London from 1948 to 1952, where he worked alongside Alexander Fleming. He became professor of pathology and bacteriology at the University of Karachi in 1952. He served as a consultant pathologist to the South West Metropolitan Regional Hospital Board of the National Health Service, as well as head of laboratories at the Medical Research Council Laboratories at Carshalton, from 1954 to 1963. He then traveled to the United States, where he served as Professor of Epidemiology and Pathology at the University of North Carolina, Chapel Hill until 1968, and as Watkins Professor of Epidemiology at Tulane University Medical Center until 1972. From 1972 to 1984, he was the Henry Mechan Professor of Public Health at the University of Glasgow.

== Roles in government investigations ==
In 1974, Stewart was part of a government-appointed team tasked with investigating experimental, now-banned whooping cough vaccines given by the British government to orphans and mentally handicapped children. In 1984, he was commissioned to write a report on the whooping cough vaccine by Britain's chief scientific officer, but the report was never made public by the then-British Health Secretary Kenneth Clarke.

== Views on vaccines ==
In the 1970s, Stewart became well known for his opposition to the pertussis vaccine, which he claimed to have supported until 1974, when he saw many vaccinated children who had still developed pertussis. By the mid-1970s, his criticisms of vaccines had attracted the attention of many parents who felt that their children had been injured by vaccines. With his support, the Association of Parents of Vaccine Damaged Children was formed in 1973. In 1977, he published a paper citing the cases of many of these children as proof that the DPT vaccine caused brain damage. In 1978, he claimed at a news conference that "As with many other infectious diseases, there was a great decline in the rate of pertussis mortality before any vaccine was available." He also claimed that it was safer to get pertussis than to receive the vaccine. In 1977, Stewart criticized the British government's Committee on Safety of Medicines for calling for a pertussis vaccination campaign. He argued that "There are no grounds for saying a major epidemic is on the way and I don't agree with the way their figures have been collected." In the next two years, however, over 100,000 children were hospitalized with pertussis, and 600 of them died. In the mid-1980s, Stewart served as the lead witness for the prosecution in the case of Johnnie Kinnear, whose mental development was allegedly stunted due to his receipt of the pertussis vaccine. The case unraveled after contradictions were revealed between Kinnear's parents' testimony and hospital records, and Stewart's role in the pertussis vaccine controversy came to an end as a result.

=== Public health consequences ===
Stewart's public criticisms of vaccines contributed to a dramatic decrease in vaccination rates in the United Kingdom, and a resulting increase in cases of pertussis there. He later made an appearance in the 1982 WRC-TV news report "Vaccine Roulette", where his work was portrayed favorably. The host of the report, Lea Thompson, introduced Stewart as a member of the Committee on Safety of Medicines, despite the fact that he had never been a member of this group. Thompson also did not mention any of Stewart's previous associations with parents who believed their children had been injured by vaccines, nor did she note that his research had been used by some such parents as evidence in lawsuits.

== Views on HIV/AIDS ==
A former World Health Organization advisor on AIDS, Stewart was described as one of two HIV/AIDS "dissidents to a degree" by the Guardian in 2000 (the other being Andrew Herxheimer). Stewart and Herxheimer both served on Thabo Mbeki's presidential advisory panel on AIDS. In a 1990 Dispatches episode about HIV/AIDS, Stewart claimed that HIV had not spread significantly among heterosexuals in either the United States or Great Britain, dismissing the disease's spread in Africa as "something else". Epidemiologist Roy M. Anderson dismissed this claim, arguing that Stewart "would benefit from becoming aware of the scientific literature". In 1995, he argued against giving azidothymidine to pregnant women who had AIDS, even though it had already been shown to be effective at preventing mother-to-child transmission of HIV. In 1997, he co-authored an article in Current Medical Research and Opinion along with several HIV/AIDS denialists, including Eleni Papadopulos-Eleopulos of the Perth Group. In 2000, he told the Guardian: "We have been criminally irresponsible - we have told people they have Aids when they are HIV positive and that's not true. We have told them there is no cure and no vaccine and they are going to die. We have caused endless stress and even suicide. Families have worried about whether their children are going to be infected. That's why it is such a panic disease. The medical establishment has made the panic." With respect to his views on the cause of AIDS, he was an outspoken supporter of Peter Duesberg's belief that it was not HIV, and argued that there was a conspiracy aimed at preventing such views from attracting public attention.
