= John Spanswick =

English cricketer

Personal information
- Full name: John George Spanswick
- Born: 30 September 1933; Folkestone, Kent, England
- Died: 15 October 2016 (aged 83)
- Batting: Right-handed
- Bowling: Right-arm medium-fast

Domestic team information
- Years: Team
- 1955–1956: Kent

Career statistics
Competition	First-class
Matches	16
Runs scored	135
Batting average	6.42
100s/50s	0/0
Top score	24
Balls bowled	2,092
Wickets	36
Bowling average	32.63
5 wickets in innings	0
10 wickets in match	0
Best bowling	4/64
Catches/stumpings	7/–
- Source: CricInfo, 5 February 2012

John George Spanswick (30 September 1933 – 15 October 2016) was an English cricketer who played first-class cricket for Kent County Cricket Club in the 1950s. Spanswick was a right-handed batsman who bowled right-arm medium-fast. He was born at Folkestone in Kent and was educated at Whitgift School.

Spanswick made his first-class debut for Kent against Middlesex in the 1955 County Championship. He made 15 further first-class appearances for the county, the last of which came against Cambridge University in 1956. In his 16 first-class appearances for Kent, he took 36 wickets at an average of 32.63, with best figures of 4/64. He scored a total of 135 runs at an average of 6.42, with a high score of 24.

Spanswick died on 15 October 2016 at the age of 83.
