= Mary Sheriff =

American art historian

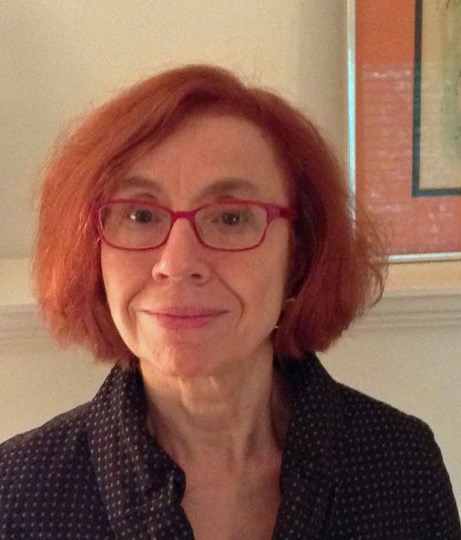
Mary D. Sheriff (1950-2016)

Mary Diana Lee Sheriff (September 19, 1950 – October 19, 2016) was an American art historian, and W.R. Kenan, Jr. Distinguished Professor of Art History at University of North Carolina at Chapel Hill who specialized in eighteenth-century French art, decorative arts, gender studies, and material culture.

== Career ==
Sheriff was a leading scholar on 18th- and 19th-century French art and culture, transforming the field by re-evaluating rococo painting, introducing feminist perspectives, and examining European art in a global context. Her work focused on issues of creativity, sexuality, gender, and travel and culture exchange. Her research included traditional facets of visual culture such as painting and sculpture, while also incorporating gardens, book illustration, material culture, performance, and the graphic arts.

Her scholarly achievements were recognized through numerous visiting professorships, invitations to lecture around the globe, awards and fellowships, as well as numerous grants from the Guggenheim Foundation, the National Endowment for the Humanities, the Getty Foundation, and the American Council of Learned Societies.

In 2004 and 2007, Sheriff co-taught with Ann Bermingham a pre-doctoral seminar, titled "Sensibility/Sensibilité in Eighteenth-Century England and France," at the Getty Research Institute.

In addition, Sheriff served as the editor of the journal Eighteenth-Century Studies from 1993 to 1998. She was also a founding member of the Historians of Eighteenth-Century Art and Architecture.

She died on October 19, 2016, at the age of 66.

== Awards ==
- 2009: Mellor Book Prize from the National Museum of Women in the Arts, awarded to her and co-author Melissa Hyde for best proposal for a scholarly book on an individual woman artist or subject related to the mission of NMWA. Their winning proposal will later be published into a book, titled Women in French Art: Rococo to Realism.
- 2010: Guggenheim fellowship

== Exhibitions curated ==
- "The Atelier of a Painter." Co-curated with Sarah Schroth. Ackland Art Museum of Art, January–May 1994.
- "Seeing the Strange." Co-curated with Timothy Riggs. Ackland Art Museum of Art, November 1997–January 1998.
- "Seasons of Paris." Co-curated with Timothy Riggs. Ackland Art Museum of Art, January–March 2001.
- "Reason and Fantasy: Art in an Enlightenment Age." Co-curated with Timothy Riggs. Ackland Art Museum, January–April 2002.
- "Witnesses to an Age of Transformation." Co-curated with Timothy Riggs. Ackland Art Museum.
- "Becoming a Woman in the Age of the Enlightenment." Co-curated with Melissa Hyde and Alvin L. Clark, Jr. Harn Museum of Art, October–December 2017; Ackland Art Museum, January–April 2018; Crocker Art Museum, May–August 2018; Smith College Museum of Art, September 2018–January 2019.

== Complete bibliography ==
=== Single authored books ===
- Fragonard: Art and Eroticism, University of Chicago Press. 1990, ISBN 978-0-226-75273-0
- The Exceptional Woman: Elisabeth Vigée-Lebrun and the Cultural Politics of Art. University of Chicago Press. 1996. ISBN 978-0-226-75282-2.
- Moved by Love: Inspired Artists and Deviant Women in Eighteenth-Century France. University of Chicago Press. 2004. ISBN 978-0-226-75287-7.; 2008, ISBN 978-0-226-75288-4
- Enchanted Islands: Picturing the Allure of Conquest in Eighteenth-Century France. University of Chicago Press. 2018. ISBN 978-0-226-48310-8.

=== Edited volumes ===
- Art History: New Voices/New Visions. Guest-edited special issue of Eighteenth-Century Studies, volume 25 (Summer 1992).
- French History in the Visual Sphere. Special issue of French Historical Studies, co-edited with Daniel J. Sherman, volume 26 (Spring 2003).
- Antoine Watteau: Perspectives on the Artist and the Culture of His Time. University of Delaware Press. 2006. ISBN 978-0874139341.
- Cultural Contact and the Making of European Art since the Age of Exploration, University of North Carolina Press, 2010, ISBN 978-0-8078-3366-7.

=== Published essays ===
- "Au génie de Franklin: An Allegory by J. H. Fragonard." Proceedings of the American Philosophical Society, volume 127, no. 3 (June 1983), pp. 180–93.
- "For Love or Money? Rethinking Fragonard." Eighteenth-Century Studies, volume 19, no. 3 (Spring 1986), pp. 333–54.
- "On Fragonard's Enthusiasm." The Eighteenth Century: Theory and Interpretation, volume 28, no. 1 (Winter 1987), pp. 29–46.
- "Invention and Resemblance in Fragonard's Portraits de Fantaisie." The Art Bulletin, volume 69, no. 1 (March 1987), pp. 77–87.
- "Comments on Revolutionary Allegory." In Proceedings of the Consortium on Revolutionary Europe (1987), pp. 681–88.
- "Reflecting on Chardin." The Eighteenth-Century: Theory and Interpretation, volume 29 (Winter 1988): pp. 19–45.
- "Pictorial Deception and Feminine Vice: On the Representation of Motherhood in Pre-Revolutionary France." Proceedings of the Consortium on Revolutionary Europe (1989), pp. 221–39.
- "Fragonard by Pierre Rosenberg." Art Journal, volume 47 (Winter 1989), pp. 368–72.
- "Fragonard's Erotic Mothers and the Politics of Reproduction." In Eroticism and the Body Politics, edited by Lynn Hunt (Baltimore: Johns Hopkins Press, 1991), pp. 14–40.
- "Woman? Hermaphrodite? History Painter? On the Self-Imaging of Elisabeth Vigée-Lebrun." The Eighteenth Century: Theory and Interpretation, volume 35 (Spring 1994): pp. 3–28.
- "The Im/modesty of her Sex: Elisabeth Vigée-Lebrun in 1783." In The Consumption of Culture, 1600-1800: Image, Object, Text, edited by Ann Bermingham and John Brewer (London: Routledge, 1995), pp. 455–88.
- "Letters: Painted/Penned/Purloined." Studies in Eighteenth-Century Culture, volume 26 (1996), pp. 29–56.
- "Reading Jupiter Otherwise, or Ovid's Women in Eighteenth-Century Art." In Myth, Sexuality and Power: Images of Jupiter in Western Art. Special issue of Archeologia Transatlantica, edited by Frances Van Keuren (Providence, RI, and Louvain-La-Neuve, Belgium: Joukowsky Institute for Archaeology & the Ancient World, 1998), pp. 79–98.
- "Les femmes artistes." In Histoire artistique de l'Europe: Le XVIIIe siècle, edited by Thomas W. Gaehtgens and Krzysztof Pomian (Paris: Seuil, 1998), pp. 199–202.
- "Passionate Spectators: On Enthusiasm, Nymphomania, and the Imagined Tableau." Huntington Library Quarterly, volume 60, no. 1/2 (1997), pp. 51–83.
- "A rebours. Le problème de l'histoire dans l'interprétation féministe." In Où en est l'interprétation de l'oeuvre d'art?, edited by Régis Michel (Paris: École des Beaux-Arts and Réunion des Musées Nationaux, 2000).
- "With Music and Flowers: Vigée-Lebrun's Russian Campaign." In The Val A. Browning Collection: A Selection of Old Master Paintings, edited by Sheila D. Muller (Salt Lake City: Utah Museum of Art and University of Utah, 2001), pp. 94–135.
- "So What Are You Working On? Categorizing The Exceptional Woman." In Singular Women: Writing the Artist, edited by Kristen Frederickson and Sarah Webb (Chicago: University of Chicago Press, 2003), pp. 48–65.
- Co-authored with Daniel J. Sherman. "Convergences: Visualizing French History." French Historical Studies (special issue, French History in the Visual Sphere), volume 26, no. 2 (Spring 2003), pp. 173–83.
- "The Portrait of the Queen." In Marie Antoinette: Writings on the Body of a Queen, edited by Dena Goodman (London: Routledge, 2003), pp. 45–72.
- "The Cradle Is Empty: Elisabeth Vigée-Lebrun, Marie-Antoinette, and the Problem of Intention." In Women and the Politics of Identity in Eighteenth-Century Europe, edited by Jennifer Milam and Melissa Hyde (London: Ashgate Press, 2004), pp. 164–87.
- "How Images Got Their Gender: Masculinity and Femininity in the Visual Arts." In A Companion to Gender History, edited by Teresa A. Meade and Merry E. Wiesner-Hanks (Malden, MA: Blackwell Publishing, 2004), pp. 146–69.
- "The Portrait of the Queen: Elisabeth Vigée-Lebrun's Marie-Antoinette en chemise." In Reclaiming the Female Agency: Feminist Art History in the Postmodern Era, edited by Mary Garrard and Norma Broude (Berkeley: University of California Press, 2005), pp. 121–41.
- "Disciplinary Problems, or What to Do with Rococo Queens." In Interdisciplinary Century: Tensions and Convergences in Eighteenth-Century Art, History, and Literature, edited by Mary Vidal and Julia Douthwaite. Studies on Voltaire and the Eighteenth-Century 2005, issue 4 (Oxford: Voltaire Foundation, 2005), pp. 79–101.
- "Decorating Knowledge: The Ornamental Book, the Philosophic Image, and the Naked Truth." Art History (special issue, Between Luxury and the Everyday: The Decorative Arts in Eighteenth-Century France, edited by Katie Scott) volume 28, no. 2 (April 2005), pp. 151–73.
- "Boucher's Enchanted Islands." In Rethinking Boucher, edited by Melissa Hyde and Mark Ledbury (Los Angeles: Getty Publications, 2006), pp. 161–80.
- "David and the Ladies." In Jacques Louis David: New Perspectives, edited by Dorothy Johnson (Newark: University of Delaware Press, 2006), pp. 90–107.
- "The Naked Truth: The Allegorical Frontispiece and Woman's Ambition in Eighteenth-Century France." In Early Modern Visual Allegory: Embodying Meaning, edited by Cristelle Baskins and Lisa Rosenthal (Burlington: Ashgate, 2007), pp. 243–64.
- "Seeing Metamorphosis in Sculpture and the Decorative Arts." In Taking Shape: Finding Sculpture in Decorative Arts, edited by Martina Droth (Leeds: Henry Moore Institute, 2008), pp. 156–65.
- "Une approche subversive: la dimension érotique dans la peinture du XVIIIe siècle" ("A Subversive Embrace: Interpreting the Erotic in Eighteenth-Century French Painting"). Histoire de l'art, volume 66 (April 2010), pp. 27–38.
- "The Dislocations of Jean-Etienne Liotard, Called the Turkish Painter." In Cultural Contact and the Making of European Art, edited by Mary Sheriff (Chapel Hill: University of North Carolina Press, 2010), pp. 97–121.
- "The King, the Trickster, and the Gorgon Head: On the Illusions of Rococo Art." Studies in Eighteenth-Century Culture, volume 40 (2011), pp. 1–26.
- "Seeing Beyond the Norm: Interpreting Gender in the Visual Arts." In The Question of Gender: Joan W. Scott's Critical Feminism, edited by Judith Butler and Elizabeth Weed (Bloomington: Indiana University Press, 2011), pp. 161–86.
- "The Woman-Artist Question." In Royalists to Romantics: Women Artists from the Louvre, Versailles, and Other French National Collections (Washington DC: National Museum of Women in the Arts, 2011), pp. 43–50.
- "Mellan Förnuft och fantasi Upplysningsfilosoferna och de kvinnliga konstnärerna." In Stolthet & Fördom, Kvinna och konstnär i Frankrike och Sverige 1750-1860 (Stockholm: Nationalmuseum, 2012), pp. 43–52.
- "Portrait de l'artiste en historienne de l'art: à propos des Souvenirs de Madame Vigée-Lebrun." In Plumes et Pinceaux: Discours de femmes sur l'art en Europe (1750-1850), edited by Mechthild Fend, Melissa Hyde, and Anne Lafont, 2 vols. (Paris: INHA/Les Presses du Réel, 2012), volume 1: Essais, pp. 53–76.
- "The Many Faces of Germaine de Staël." In Staël's Philosophy of the Passions: Sensibility, Society, and the Sister Arts, edited by Tili Boon Cuillé and Karyna Szmurlo (Lewisburg, PA: Bucknell University Press, 2013), pp. 205–36.
- "Painting Fénelon in the French Regency," in Fénelon in the Enlightenment: Traditions, Adaptations, and Variations, edited by Christoph Schmitt-Maaß, Stefanie Stockhorst, and Doohwan Ahn (Amsterdam: Rodopi, 2014), pp. 281–312.
- "Nails, Necklaces and Curiosities: Scenes of Exchange in Bougainville's Tahiti." Art History (special issue, Objects in Motion in the Early Modern World, edited by Meredith Martin and Daniela Bleichmar), volume 38 (September 2015), pp. 792–804. Republished in Objects in Motion in the Early Modern World (London: Wiley-Blackwell, 2016), pp. 196–209.
- "Aux prises avec les désir" ("Grapping with Desire"). In Fragonard Amoureux, Galant et Libertin, edited by Guillaume Faroult (Paris: Réunion des Musées Nationaux, 2015), pp. 41–49.
- "Decorated Interiors: Gender, Ornament and Moral Values." Études sur le XVIIIe siècle (special issue, Corrélations: Les objets du décor au siècle des Lumières, edited by Anne Perrin Khelissa), volume 43 (November 2015), pp. 47–62.
- "Love Hurts: The Pleasures and Perils of Love in Eighteenth-Century French Art." In French Art of the Eighteenth Century: The Michael L. Rosenberg Lecture Series at the Dallas Museum of Art, edited by Heather MacDonald (New Haven: Yale University Press, 2016), pp. 38–51.
- "Movement and Stasis: Another Voyage to Cythera." In Body Narratives: Motion and Emotion in the French Enlightenment, edited by Susanna Caviglia (Turnhout: Brepols, 2017), pp. 189–220.
- "Casanova, Art, and Eroticism." Journal 18 (January 2018), http://www.journal18.org/2367
- "Emotional Geographies: Watteau and the Fate of Women." In The Eighteenth Centuries: Global Networks of Enlightenment, edited by David T. Gies and Cynthia Wall (Charlottesville: University of Virginia Press, 2018), pp. 149–77.
- "Pour l'histoire des femmes artistes: historiographie, politique et théorie." Perspective: Actualité en histoire de l'art (2017), pp. 91–112. Translated by Françoise Jaouën.

=== Other publications ===
- Entries for "Marie-Anne Collot", "Marguerite Gérard", "Marie-Victoire Lemoine", and "Elisabeth Vigée-Lebrun" for Dictionnaire des femmes de l'Ancienne France (SIEFAR)
- Foreword for Louly Peacock Konz, Marie Bashkirtseff's Life in Self-Portraits (1858-1884): Woman as Artist in Nineteenth-Century France Marie Bashkirtseff's Life in Self-portraits 1858-1884: Woman As Artist in Nineteenth-Century France (Lewiston, NY: Edwin Mellen Press, 2006).
- Entry for "Rococo," in Encyclopedia of the Enlightenment, edited by Alan Charles Kors (Oxford: Oxford University Press, 2002).
- Entries for "Marie-Anne Collot," "Marguerite Gérard," "Marie-Victoire Lemoine," "Elisabeth Vigée-Lebrun," and "Women and Academies in France" for Dictionary of Women Artists, edited by Delia Gaze (London: Fitzroy-Dearborn, 1997).
- "Pygmalion Transformed, or the Progress of Art and Love." Atelier Magazine (May 1990), pp. 26–31.
