= Harry Lincoln Sayler =

- Born: 1863; Little York, Montgomery Co., Ohio
- Died: 31 May 1913 (aged 49–50); Indianapolis, Indiana
- Other names: Ashton Lamar; Elliott Whitney; Gordon Stuart
- Occupation: Writer
- Known for: Novels

Harry Lincoln Sayler (1863–1913) was a newspaperman and novelist, under his own name and pseudonyms, including as a ghost writer for a popular youth fiction series.

Sayler graduated from DePauw University. He married June Elliott of Shelbyville, Indiana in 1889. They had two children. By occupation Sayler was a newsman, starting in 1886 in Indianapolis. By 1889 he was working in Chicago, eventually becoming general manager of the City News Bureau of Chicago. Sayler was interested in history and became a member of the Illinois State Historical Society, the Chicago Historical Association, and the Louisiana Historical Association. He developed an expertise on the subject of pirates.

Sayler wrote three series of juvenile fiction relating to the then-novel technology of airplanes and flight. He wrote the Boy Scouts of the Air series under the pen name Gordon Stuart, the Aeroplane Boys series as Ashton Lamar, and the Airship Boys series under his own name.

Sayler also wrote for another juvenile series, the Boys' Big Game series, under the pseudonym Elliott Whitney.

== Works ==
=== Boy Scouts of the Air series ===
- Stuart, Gordon (1912). The Boy Scouts of the air at Eagle Camp. Chicago: Reilly & Britton.
- Stuart, Gordon (1912). The Boy Scouts of the Air at Greenwood School. CIHM/ICMH Microfiche series = CIHM/ICMH collection de microfiches; no. 79277. Chicago: Reilly & Britton. ISBN 9780665792779.
- Stuart, Gordon (1912). The Boy Scouts of the Air in northern wilds. Chicago: Reilly & Britton.
- Stuart, Gordon (1912). The Boy Scouts of the air in Indian land. Chicago: Reilly & Britton.
- Stuart, Gordon (1913). The Boy Scouts of the Air on Flathead Mountain. Chicago: Reilly & Britton.
- Stuart, Gordon (1914). The Boy Scouts of the Air on the Great Lakes (PDF). Chicago: Reilly & Britton.
- The Boy Scouts of the Air at Greenwood School (1912)
- The Boy Scouts of the Air in Belgium (1915)
- The Boy Scouts of the Air on Lost Island (1917)
- Boy Scouts of the Air with Pershing (1919)
- The Boy Scouts of the Air at Cape Peril (1921)

=== The Aeroplane Boys series ===
- Lamar, Ashton (1910). In the clouds for Uncle Sam; or, Morey Marshall of the Signal Corps.
- Lamar, Ashton (1910). The Stolen Aeroplane; or, how Bud Wilson made good.
- Lamar, Ashton (1910). The aeroplane express; or, the boy aeronaut's grit.
- Lamar, Ashton (1910). The Boy Aeronauts Club; or, Flying for fun.
- Lamar, Ashton (1911). A cruise in the sky; or, the legend of the great pink pearl.
- Lamar, Ashton (1911). Battling the Bighorn; or, the aeroplane in the rockies.
- Lamar, Ashton (1912). When Scout Meets Scout; or, The Aeroplane Spy.
- Lamar, Ashton (1913). On the edge of the Arctic: an aeroplane in snowland.

=== The Airship Boys series ===
- Sayler, Harry Lincoln (1909). The Airship Boys; or, The quest of the Aztec Treasure.
- Sayler, Harry Lincoln (1910). The Airship Boys adrift; or, Saved by an aeroplane.
- Sayler, Harry Lincoln (1910). The Airship Boys in the barren lands; or, the Secret of the White Eskimos.
- Sayler, Harry Lincoln (1910). The Airship Boys due north; or, by balloon to the pole.
- Sayler, Harry Lincoln (1911). The Airship Boys in Finance; or, The flight of the Flying Cow.
- Sayler, Harry Lincoln (1911). The Airship Boys' Ocean Flyer; or, New York to London in twelve hours.
- Sayler, Harry Lincoln (1913). The Airship Boys as Detectives; or, Secret Service in Cloudland.

The last volume in this series was not written by Sayler.

=== Boys' Big Game series ===
- Whitney, Elliott (1912). The blind lion of the Congo. Chicago: Reilly & Britton. "harry lincoln sayler."
- Whitney, Elliott (1912). The White Tiger of Nepal. Chicago: Reilly & Britton.
- Whitney, Elliott (1912). The Giant Moose. Chicago: Reilly & Britton.
- Whitney, Elliott (1912). The King Bear of Kadiak Island. Chicago: Reilly & Britton.
- Whitney, Elliott (1913). The Rogue Elephant. Chicago: Reilly & Britton.
