= W. Dudley Johnson =

American cardiothoracic surgeon

Wenner Dudley Johnson (April 3, 1930 – October 24, 2016) was an American cardiothoracic surgeon who became known as the father of coronary artery bypass surgery. He and a colleague operated on one of the longest-surviving patients in the early days of heart transplants, and he made significant contributions to several other cardiac surgical procedures.

== Biography ==
Johnson was born in Madison, Wisconsin. His father, Royce, was an electrical engineer. His mother, Olga, was a home economics teacher who came from a Swedish immigrant family. Johnson said that his parents met at the University of Wisconsin–Madison, where his father was an engineering professor and his mother taught home economics. When he was 13, Johnson moved with his family to Rockford, Illinois; his father had decided to leave academia and had found a job in industry.

When Johnson was a child, his mother taught him to crochet; he also took a sewing class in the seventh grade. Though these skills helped him to become a surgeon, Johnson initially set out to be a family practitioner; he was nearly turned off from surgery because he disliked the arrogance of surgeons. After graduating with an undergraduate degree at the University of Illinois and earning an M.D. at the university's medical school, Johnson became interested in surgery during his internship at Cook County Hospital in Chicago.

After being drafted into the United States Navy, Johnson discovered that he was susceptible to seasickness, so he joined the United States Public Health Service. Later, he joined cardiac surgeon Derward Lepley in Milwaukee to work on coronary artery bypass procedures. Johnson became known for a 1968 operation in which he bypassed a patient's right coronary artery using a vein taken from the patient's leg. The same year, Lepley and Johnson performed a heart transplant. The patient lived for nine years after the transplant; at the time, that patient's survival was the longest of any heart transplant patient.

Johnson was known for his early work on coronary artery bypass surgery and carotid endarterectomy. He introduced the administration of allopurinol to lower mortality in cardiac surgery patients. He also made breakthroughs in stopping the blood flow through the heart during surgery and in lowering the cardiac surgery patient's temperature during surgery. Johnson was known as a surgeon who could operate on heart patients after other physicians told them they should prepare to die. By the late 1990s, Johnson was working on surgical treatments for the arrhythmia known as atrial fibrillation, and he was studying the usefulness of injecting genetic material into the heart to generate blood vessel growth.

Johnson lived on a farm in Germantown, Wisconsin, where he grew organic crops, including apples and asparagus. He suffered a stroke after a medical society meeting in Milwaukee in October 2016. He died a few days later.
