= Song Yeong =

South Korean writer (1940–2016)

- Born: March 15, 1940; Yeongkwang Jeollanam-do, Korea
- Died: October 14, 2016 (aged 76)
- Writing career
- Pen name: Mokdang (목당-木堂)
- Language: Korean
- Period: 1967–2016

Korean name
- Hangul: 송영
- Hanja: 宋榮
- RR: Song Yeong
- MR: Song Yŏng

Song Yeong (Korean: 송영; March 15, 1940 – October 14, 2016) was a South Korean modern writer.

== Life ==
Seong Young was born on March 15, 1940, in Yeongkwang Jeollanam-do, Korea. Song graduated with a degree in German Literature from Hankuk University of Foreign Studies. After his graduation in 1963, he took a teaching job. His literary debut came in 1967 with the publication of "Cock-fighting" in the journal Creation and Criticism (Changjakgwa bipyeong). His sobriquet was Mokdang. He died on October 14, 2016, aged 76.

== Work ==
The Korea Literature Translation Institute summarizes his work:

Song Yeong's fiction often unfolds in unusual settings through perspectives of unconventional characters. "The Teacher and the Crown Prince" (Seonsaenggwa hwangtaeja) and "The Day My Love Comes" take place in a prison, and "A Train on the Central Line" (Jungangseon gicha), narrates various events that occur inside a crowded train. For Song Yeong, these spaces offer unexpectedly accurate microcosms of the larger society; wild commotion and meaningless violence that the narrator observes, often with ironic detachment and terseness, raise questions about our lives in the real world. Often these questions lead to a critique of various forms of authority that flout common sense and fetter individual freedom. Typically, Song Yeong's characters remain outside the network of relations that secure individuals' social identities. "Cock-fighting" (Tugye, 1967) features as the protagonist a man who remains holed up in his own world and whose perception of the external reality is skewed to the extreme. Existential angst also marks the attitude of the main character to the world around him in "On the Steps".

== Works in Korean (Partial) ==
Novels

- To My Bride (Naui sinbuege)
- My Love Will Open Her Eyes (Geudae nuntteuri, 1979)
- Love Song in a Peanut Shell (Ttangkong kkeopjil sogui yeonga, 1977)
- The Running Emperor (Dallineun hwangje, 1979)

Short Story Collections

- The Teacher and the Crown Prince (1974)
- Night in the Park (Jeonyeok gongwoneseo)
- That Room at the End of the Slope (Bitalgil jeo kkeut bang, 1989)

Notable Short Stories

- "Seasons" (Gyejeol)
- "Memo of a Job Seeker" (Gujikjaui sugi)
- "A Paradox Concerning Spring" (Bome gwanhan yeokseol)
- "Sound of Footprints" (Baljaguk sori)
- "Sound of Drums" (Buk sori), "Doctor Kim"
- "The Photographer on the Roof" (Jibung wiui sajinsa)
- "In the Doghouse" (Gaejibeseo)
- "The Braggart" (Heopungjangi)
- "The Leader" (Jidoja).

== Awards ==
- Contemporary Literature Prize in 1987
