= New Alcazar Hotel =

- U.S. National Register of Historic Places
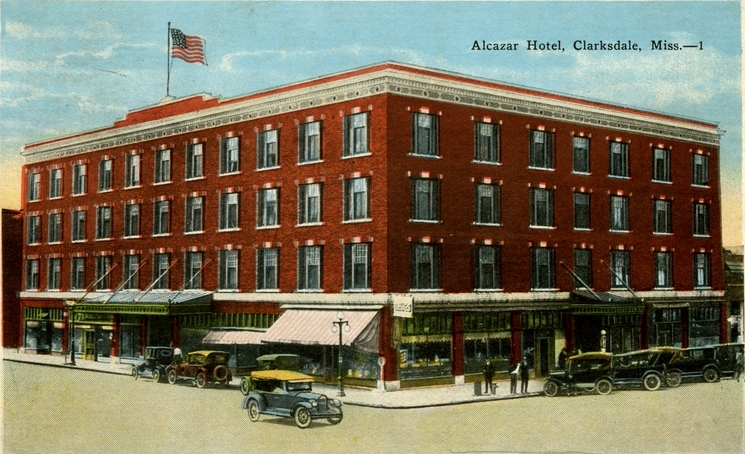
- Early 20th Century drawing of the Alcazar Hotel
- Location: 127 Third Street, Clarksdale, Mississippi, U.S.
- Coordinates: 34°12′05″N 90°34′25″W
- Built: 1914-1915
- Architect: Charles O. Pfeil
- Architectural style: Colonial Revival/Classical Revival
- NRHP reference No.: 94000646
- Added to NRHP: June 24, 1994

The New Alcazar Hotel, also known as Alcazar Hotel, is a historic building in Clarksdale, Mississippi, United States. Once considered one of the premier hotels in the South, its guests included the playwright Tennessee Williams. Located in the hotel were a restaurant and several other businesses, including WROX radio station, which broadcast from the hotel for 40 years.

== History ==
The original Moorish-influenced, Romanesque revival Alcazar Hotel was built in 1895. After the construction of an adjacent “new” hotel in 1915, the original structure was used as an annex until it was destroyed by arson caused by a former employee in 1947. The new hotel was built by the architect Charles O. Pfeil of Memphis, and was completed by 1915. Billed as the "most modern hotel in Mississippi", it had a glass dome skylight and was more spacious than the original. The building had four stories, with eleven storefront bays where prominent Clarksdale businesses operated. The hotel was remodeled in 1938 to include a private bath in each room. Around 1948, a mezzanine level was introduced between the first and second floors.

In the 1940s, the musician Ike Turner operated the elevator in the hotel as a pre-teen. He also worked as a DJ at WROX radio located in the hotel. Musicians including Elvis Presley, Muddy Waters, Ike & Tina Turner, and B.B. King performed live at WROX and were interviewed by Early Wright, the first black DJ in Mississippi.

Prior to the passage of the Civil Rights Act of 1964, the hotel and its coffee shop only served white people. After the Act was passed, the Clarksdale King Anderson Company, which owned the hotel, instructed employees to continue to "refuse service to Negroes". According to a 1965 U.S. District Court ruling, on July 6, 1964, Reverend George W. Trotter III, a black man, and Vera Mae Pigee, a black woman, attempted to obtain a hotel room and service at the coffee shop respectively. Both were refused because of their race. The next day, the owners closed the hotel and coffee shop to avoid serving black customers. A few weeks later, on July 27, the Regency Club was founded as a whites-only private club, working in conjunction with Clarksdale King Anderson for use of the hotel, coffee shop, and staff. In December 1965, the court ruled against the discriminatory practices, barring the hotel from operating in cahoots with the club.

The Alcazar Hotel was eventually closed and the building was used for other commercial purposes. WROX moved out of the building in the 1990s. The hotel was added to the National Register of Historic Places in 1994. In 2009, the hotel was listed as one of the 10 Most Endangered Historic Places in Mississippi by the Mississippi Heritage Trust. There have been plans to facilitate the building; as of 2017, it has been repainted and weatherproofed but remains vacant.
