= Charles O. Pfeil =

American architect and golfer (1871–1927)

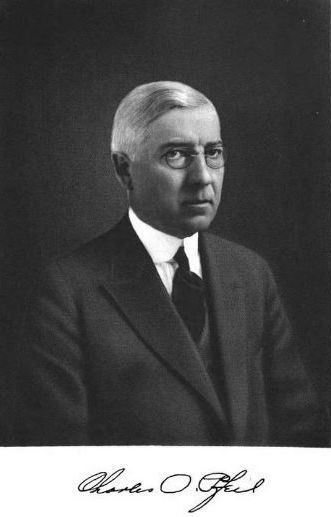
- Born: 9 April 1871; Jacksonville, Illinois, US
- Died: 3 December 1927 (aged 56); Memphis, Tennessee, US
- Occupation: Architect
- Buildings: Alcazar Hotel; Dermon Building; Tennessee Trust Building; Memphis Market Hall and Civic Auditorium; Memphis Chamber of Commerce

Charles Oscar Pfeil (9 April 1871 – 2 December 1927) was an American architect and golfer, primarily based in Memphis, Tennessee (USA), during the first third of the twentieth century. He formed the prominent Memphis architectural firm Pfeil and Awsumb with his colleague George Awsumb between 1919 and his death.

== Life and architectural career ==
Pfeil was of German descent, and born in Jacksonville, Illinois, in April 1871 on a farm, one of eleven children. He attended high school in Jacksonville and then Brown's College in Jacksonville until 1888, before enrolling in the agricultural program at Kansas State Mechanical College. He was not enthused by farming, and in 1891 transferred to the University of Illinois's College of Architecture, graduating in 1893. In subsequent years Pfeil worked for various architectural firms in Peoria, Chicago, and St. Louis before moving to Memphis in 1903.

Memphis was where Pfeil finally left his mark. He formed a partnership with George M. Shaw, with whom he designed the Tennessee Trust Building (1906), later the Union & Planters Bank, and since 2002 the Madison Hotel. Together they also designed the Chamber of Commerce Building (1910), supposedly inspired by the designs of famed Chicago-based architect Louis H. Sullivan. Pfeil's other work included the William R. Moore Dry Goods Company and an addition to the rebuilt 1899 Gayoso Hotel. On this project he apparently collaborated with Professor Newton Alonzo Wells at the University of Illinois for the lobby's mural decorations, which one source called Memphis's "only real works of public art."

Pfeil remained in partnership with Shaw until 1912, when the two evidently went their separate ways. He was asked to design numerous houses for private citizens in Memphis, including P.P. Williams, John R. Pepper and Walter Lane Smith. In 1919, Pfeil asked Chicago-based architect George Awsumb, a fellow alum of the University of Illinois (though much later than Pfeil) whom Pfeil probably knew from his stint in the Windy City, to collaborate with him on the competition design for the Memphis Market Hall and City Auditorium, which the two of them won. Awsumb relocated to Memphis, where he an Pfeil formally merged their practices as Pfeil & Awsumb. The two would remain partners until Pfeil's death in 1927. Over the next eight years, they continued the work that Pfeil had undertaken, designing the Dermon Building (1925), still one of Memphis' prominent downtown office buildings, two high schools, and the Idlewild Presbyterian Church (1926–28).

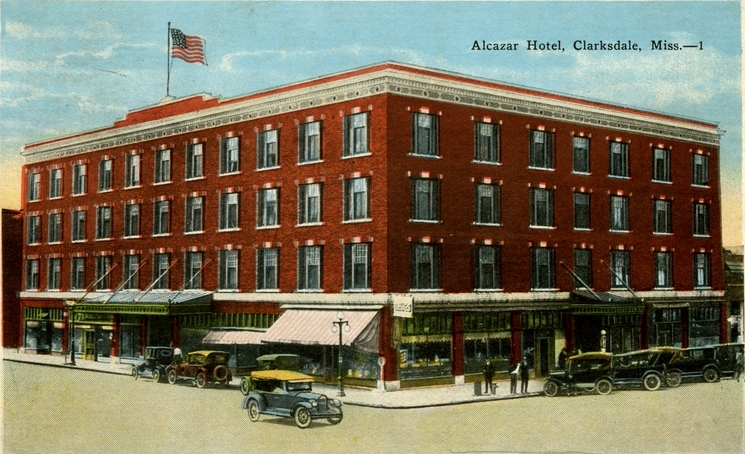
One of Pfeil's best-known buildings outside of Memphis is the (New) Alcazar Hotel in downtown Clarksdale, Mississippi.

Pfeil's reputation in Memphis brought him into contact with the white planter elites in and around Clarksdale, Mississippi, the largest city in the northern part of the Mississippi Delta. Pfeil was asked to design at least four buildings in Clarksdale in the 1910s and '20s, including the New Alcazar Hotel, which was billed as "the most modern hotel in Mississippi" when it was built in 1914–15, with a glass domed skylit lobby.

Pfeil was a member of several local and national professional associations, including the Tennessee Club, the Memphis Chamber of Commerce, the American Institute of Architects (AIA), and the Memphis Architectural League.

== Golfer ==
Pfeil was an active and enthusiastic golfer, and belonged to the Memphis Country Club. He served as an officer of the Southern Golf Association, founded in 1902, and for three years as president of the Western Golf Association (1899), in which post he was responsible for resolving some disputes between the WGA and the larger United States Golf Association. In 1923 he was named to the executive committee of the USGA, where he became particularly interested, apparently, in the science of greens-keeping and in making sure that, while the sport's popularity grew, its new enthusiasts did not “treat with indifference the rules and etiquette of the game.” Pfeil was named a vice-president of the USGA in 1926 and chosen as the new USGA president in October 1927, an honor he would enjoy for just a few days before his death. Significantly, he was the first person not based in the Eastern US to be named president.

== Death and personal life ==
Pfeil came down with a mysterious illness, described as "septicemia" in early October 1927 and entered the hospital soon after, lingering for some two months. His progress was covered rather assiduously by national newspapers, as he had recently been elected to head the USGA. In the first few days of December he seemed to be beginning to recover, but then took a turn for the worse and died on 2 December.

After Pfeil's death, his partner George Awsumb apparently did not change the firm's name until 1929. Awsumb remained in practice until the early 1950s. His papers, including some from his partnership with Pfeil, are now part of the Awsumb Architectural Collection of the Memphis Municipal Libraries.

Pfeil married Myra Russell Hancock on 15 September 1909. She died on 1 February 1915; they had no children.

== Significant buildings ==
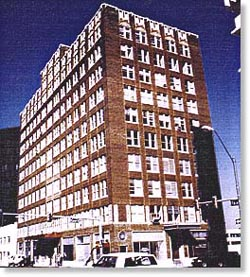
The Dermon Building in Memphis, one of Pfeil's best-known works, completed in partnership with George Awsumb.

As Shaw and Pfeil:

- Tennessee Trust Building (now Madison Hotel), Memphis, Tennessee (1906)
- Chamber of Commerce Building (1910)
- The Commercial Appeal Building, Memphis, Tennessee (1910–11)
- Fire Engine House #1, Memphis, Tennessee (1910)
- Memphis Police Station (1911)

Independent Practice:

- W. P. Halliday House, Memphis, Tennessee (1912)
- William R. Moore Dry Goods Building, Memphis, Tennessee (1913)
- (New) Alcazar Hotel, Clarksdale, Mississippi (1914–15)
- P.P. Williams House, Memphis, Tennessee
- John R. Pepper House, Memphis, Tennessee
- Walter Lane Smith House, Memphis, Tennessee

As Pfeil and Awsumb:

- Municipal Auditorium and Market House (1920–24), on Main Street, Memphis, Tennessee
- Humes Junior High School (1923–24), 659 Manassas, Memphis, Tennessee, NRHP-listed
- Southside High School, Memphis, Tennessee
- Dermon Building (1925) Memphis, Tennessee, NRHP-listed
- Idlewild Presbyterian Church (1926–27), 1750 Union Avenue, Memphis, Tennessee (Awsumb, George), NRHP-listed
