= John Clark House (Clarksdale, Mississippi) =

Historic house in Mississippi, United States

- U.S. National Register of Historic Places
- Location within Mississippi Location within the United States
- Location: 211 Clark St., Clarksdale, Mississippi
- Coordinates: 34°12′25″N 90°34′27″W
- Built: 1859
- Architectural style: Greek Revival, Colonial Revival architecture
- NRHP reference No.: 03000589
- Added to NRHP: July 5, 2003

The John Clark House in Clarksdale, Mississippi was built in 1859 with elements of Greek Revival style. It was moved approximately 100 yards (91 m) in 1916 to make way for a grand house, the Italian Renaissance style Cutrer Mansion, to be built in its place. The John Clark House was then remodeled, including that its "two-tiered one-bay porch supported with turned posts was replaced with a then-stylish Colonial Revival porch."

It was listed on the National Register of Historic Places in 2003. It now operates as an 8-guest room house, each of which have private baths.

== See also ==
- National Register of Historic Places listings in Coahoma County, Mississippi
- Riverside Hotel: Blues Trail site in Clarksdale
- Delta Blues Museum
- John Clark (Clarksdale founder)
