= Wright Thompson =

American journalist

- Born: September 9, 1976 (age 49); Clarksdale, Mississippi, U.S.
- Education: University of Missouri
- Occupation: Journalist
- Writing career
- Subjects: Sports, society

Wright Thompson (born September 9, 1976) is a senior writer for ESPN.com and ESPN The Magazine. He formerly worked at The Kansas City Star and Times-Picayune in New Orleans. Thompson's topics have covered a wide range of sports issues.

== Early life and education ==
Thompson is a native of Clarksdale in northern Mississippi, the son of Mary Thompson. His late father, Walter Wright Thompson, an attorney, played a pivotal role in Clarksdale's emergence as a tourist destination based on blues music. The senior Thompson was an ardent Democrat who was the Mississippi finance chairman for John Glenn's 1984 presidential campaign. He later supported Michael Dukakis and Bill Clinton in their campaigns against George H. W. Bush. Thompson is a 1996 graduate of Lee Academy, where his peers voted him Most Likely to Succeed and student body president.

== Career ==
Thompson started his sportswriting career while a student at the University of Missouri in Columbia, having covered Missouri sports and writing as a columnist for the School of Journalism's Columbia Missourian.

Between his junior and senior years, he interned at the Times-Picayune in New Orleans and later was the LSU beat writer there. He later moved to the Kansas City Star, where he covered a wide variety of sports events including Super Bowls, Final Fours, The Masters, and The Kentucky Derby.

In 2006, he assumed full-time writing duties at ESPN.com.

In 2008, after watching the University of Alabama narrowly defeat Louisiana State University in a home game in Baton Rouge, Thompson described Tiger Stadium as "the best place in the world to watch a sporting event."

His 2010 article "Ghosts of Mississippi" inspired the 2012 ESPN 30 for 30 series documentary film The Ghosts of Ole Miss (which Thompson narrated), about the 1962 football team's perfect season and concurrent violence and rioting over integration of the segregated university by James Meredith. He also narrated the ESPN 30 for 30 film Roll Tide/War Eagle.

In 2024, Penguin Press published The Barn, Thompson's account of the 1955 abduction, torture, and lynching of the fourteen-year-old Black boy Emmett Till by white men near Drew, Mississippi.

=== Article on Dublin ===
His 2017 article on Conor McGregor and Dublin for ESPN was criticised by residents for bearing no resemblance to the actual city. Jennifer O'Connell wrote:

In the piece, McGregor's childhood upbringing in the "projects" of Crumlin and Drimnagh suggests he was brought up in the Gaza Strip or 1920s Chicago, not a neighbourhood in which this writer lived for six happy and peaceful years, oblivious to the grenades whizzing by, or the fact that I should have been taking an armed escort whenever I had to cross the Liffey.

— Jennifer O'Connell, "Conor McGregor, Crumlin and the Kinahans: an unrecognisable Dublin", The Irish Times

She also suggested that the author might have been duped by interviewees: "To be fair to Wright Thompson, you can't help feeling that some of his interviewees might have seen him – and a Hollywood agent – coming."

Fintan O'Toole called Thompson's description of Dublin "ludicrous".

Rick O'Shea tweeted:

I grew up in both the 'projects' *ahem* of Crumlin and Drimnagh. This is lazy stereotyping bullshit of the highest order ...

— Rick O'Shea, in Tom Lutz, "ESPN's portrait of a gang-infested Dublin attracts bemusement in Ireland", The Guardian

== Bibliography (selected) ==
=== Auto racing ===
- "The son also rises"

=== Baseball ===
- "Fading Away"
- "Bonds story to be continued"
- "The long road from Las Martinas"
- "When winter never ends"

=== Basketball ===
- "King's dream comes alive for Blazers"
- "Hoops of Nazareth"
- "Michael Jordan Has Not Left The Building
- "Caitlin Clark and Iowa find peace in the process"

=== Boxing ===
- "Shadow Boxing"

=== Bourbon ===
Pappyland: A Story of Family, Fine Bourbon, and the Things That Last (2020). New York: Penguin Press.

=== Bullfighting ===
- "Glory vs. Death: At the bullfights in Tijuana"
- "Haunted by the Horns"

=== Cricket ===
- "Test of Time: In defense of a game that lasts five days"
- "Why you should care about cricket"; alternative title: "In Tendulkar country"
- "Bangladesh madly in love with cricket"

=== Father's Day ===
- "Holy Ground"

=== Football ===
- "Pulled pork and pigskin: a love letter to Southern football"
- "An obsession realized: Manning and the Super Bowl"
- "Patterson rumbles to glory as Eagles romp"
- "OTL: The Burden of Being Myron Rolle"

=== Golf ===
- "The Secret History of Tiger Woods"

=== Horse racing ===
- How to listen to and download the ESPN Investigates podcast 'Bloodlines,' reported and hosted by Wright Thompson

=== Race ===
- The Barn: The Secret History of a Murder in Mississippi (2024). New York: Penguin Press.

=== Soccer ===
- "The last days of Juventus?"
- Portrait Of A Serial Winner

=== Sports history / issues ===
- "O'Neil was the real 'voice' of America"
- "Thompson: Contempt for the system"
- "Outrageous Injustice"
- "Believeland: A proud city forgets 'The Player Who Left' and remembers what it used to be"
