= Marco McMillian =

American political candidate (1979–2013)

- Born: April 23, 1979; Mississippi, U.S.
- Died: February 26, 2013 (aged 33); Near Clarksdale, Mississippi, U.S.
- Cause of death: Murder
- Body discovered: Near the levee between Sherard and Rena Lara
- Resting place: Heavenly Rest Cemetery, Lyon, Mississippi
- Education: Clarksdale High School (1997)
- Alma mater: Jackson State University (magna cum laude); Saint Mary's University of Minnesota master's degree, philanthropy and development)
- Occupations: CEO of MWM & Associates
- Political party: Democrat

Marco McMillian (April 23, 1979 – February 26, 2013) was a businessman and candidate for mayor of Clarksdale, Mississippi, in 2013. He was "the first openly gay man to be a viable candidate for public office in Mississippi". McMillian was CEO of MWM & Associates, a firm that provided consulting to nonprofit organizations.

== Background ==
Marco McMillian was born in 1979 in Mississippi. After attending local schools, he attended Jackson State University, studying business, and went on to earn a master's degree from Saint Mary's University of Minnesota.

He developed his own business, eventually becoming CEO of MWM & Associates, which provided consulting to nonprofit organizations. He became active in the Democratic Party, and in 2013 he ran for mayor of Clarksdale, Mississippi.

== Death ==
On February 27, 2013, McMillian was found dead at age 33 beside a levee near Clarksdale, having been beaten and burned. The FBI released a statement saying that it is "aware of the case, has been monitoring the state investigation, and will assess evidence to determine whether federal prosecution is appropriate". Lawrence Reed, age 22, was charged with murder on February 28. Reed was "allegedly driving McMillian's SUV when it was involved in a head-on crash" on February 26, and Reed was subsequently airlifted to a local hospital to treat his injuries.

According to his mother and stepfather, McMillian had left his house at around 10 p.m. on the evening of February 25 to move some cars out of the driveway, but his stepfather noted that he had not returned inside when he awoke at midnight. A friend of Reed who saw him on the morning of February 26 stated that Reed said he had met with McMillian, and together, Reed and McMillian planned to go to a party in a neighboring town, but McMillian had driven them to a deserted place and made sexual advances to Reed. Reed claimed he acted in self-defense after McMillian attempted to rape him. Reed used his wallet chain to choke McMillian and then dragged him into a body of water to make sure that he was dead. He then doused the body in gasoline and set it on fire. The friend saw a visibly bloodied Reed at approximately 8 a.m. on the morning of February 26. At 8:30 a.m., Reed was involved in a head-on collision while driving McMillian's vehicle, and police began to search for McMillian.

McMillian's funeral was held on March 9, 2013.

On May 1, 2013, an autopsy report said blunt force trauma most likely contributed to McMillian's death, but the cause of death was listed as "asphyxia by undetermined etiology." It did not give an exact reason for the death beyond calling it a homicide.

Reed was held in custody without bond after his arrest. In August 2013, a judge in Coahoma County ordered the case against Reed moved to Quitman County, where it is alleged the murder took place. Reed was indicted by a grand jury in Quitman County in February 2014.

On April 2, 2015, Reed was found guilty of the murder following a jury trial and sentenced to life in prison.
