= Art Davis (American football) =

American football player and coach (1934–2021)

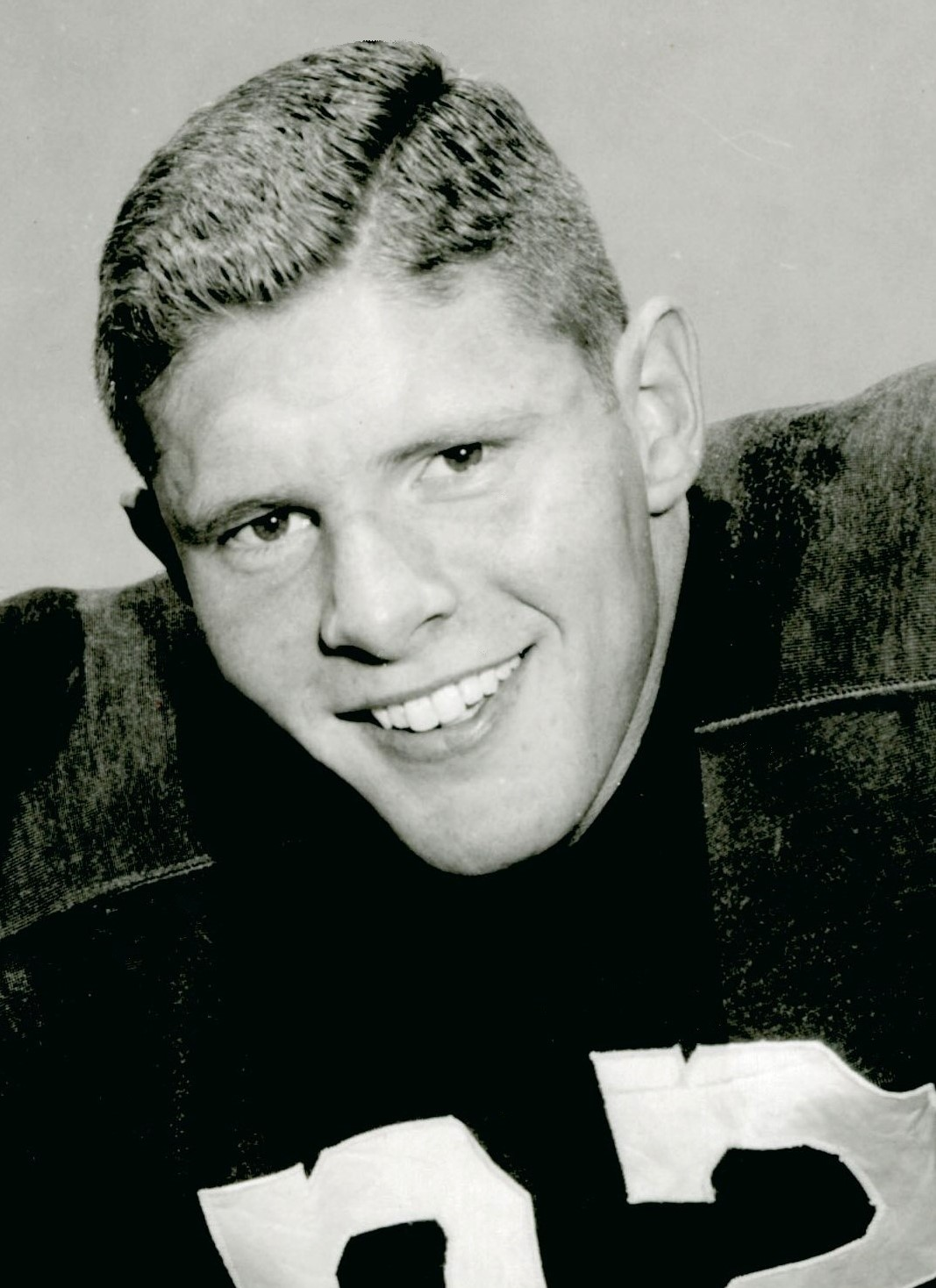

No. 22, 45, 44
- Positions: Halfback, defensive back

Personal information
- Born: November 29, 1934; Clarksdale, Mississippi, U.S.
- Died: January 29, 2021 (aged 86); Starkville, Mississippi, U.S.
- Listed height: 6 ft 2 in (1.88 m)
- Listed weight: 195 lb (88 kg)

Career information
- High school: Clarksdale
- College: Mississippi State
- NFL draft: 1956: 1st round, 5th overall pick

Career history
- Pittsburgh Steelers (1956)

Awards and highlights
- First-team All-American (1955); SEC Player of the Year (1954); First-team All-SEC (1954); Mississippi State Athletic Hall of Fame (1971); Mississippi Sports Hall of Fame (1981); SEC Football Legend (2004); Mississippi State Football "Ring of Honor" (2018)

Career NFL statistics
- Rushing yards: 6
- Rushing average: 1.2
- Receptions: 1
- Receiving yards: 9
- Stats at Pro Football Reference

Arthur Ganong Davis (November 29, 1934 – January 29, 2021) was an American professional football player who played collegiately at Mississippi State from 1952 to 1955 and for one season with the Pittsburgh Steelers in the National Football League (NFL).

== Early life ==
Art Davis was born in Clarksdale, Mississippi, where he attended Clarksdale High School. He received a football scholarship to Mississippi State after missing his entire senior high school football season breaking his leg in the first game. He was voted "Best Athlete" and "Mr. CHS" at Clarksdale High School. Davis's nickname growing up was "Honeybee" which was given to him by a nurse when he was a young boy.

== College career ==
At Mississippi State, Davis began his college football career as a four-year starter for Coach Murray Warmath as a true freshman defensive back in the 1952 season opener against defending National Champion, University of Tennessee. In the 1953 season-opener against Memphis State, Davis was a two-way starter and scored the first touchdown of Jack Cristil's 58-year broadcasting career for the Bulldogs. On Thanksgiving Day, Davis caught a touchdown pass from Jackie Parker to tie Ole Miss 7–7, knocking the Rebels out of Cotton Bowl contention and the Southeastern Conference crown. In 1954, Davis was voted the Southeastern Conference "Player of the Year" (Nashville Banner, Atlanta Constitution) where he scored 10 touchdowns and grabbed 4 interceptions playing both ways. He was also named the SEC's "Best Offensive Back" in 1954 (Atlanta Constitution). In that '54 campaign, Davis scored four touchdowns against LSU (3 rushing, 1 interception return) in a 25–0 win at Tiger Stadium in Baton Rouge. During that season, Davis played all 60 minutes in 6 of 10 games. In 1955 as team co-captain, Davis was named first-team All America by FWAA/Look (American magazine) and College Football's "Player of the Year" by the Football Writers Association of America. He was named as the "Best Defensive Back" and runner-up as "Best Offensive Back" in the SEC (Atlanta Constitution) that same year. He also punted for over a 40 yard average. Playing with a separated shoulder and injured knee at Auburn, Davis ran for a short touchdown, passed for a 35-yard score, had a 54-yard punt and made 11 unassisted tackles in a 27–26 loss. Paul Brown, head coach of the Cleveland Browns, said Davis was the best college defensive back in the country entering the ‘56 College All Star Game. He finished his college career with 18 TDs. Davis was a sprinter on the track team and was nosed out in the finals of the 1955 SEC Track and Field Championship's 100 yard dash in a photo-finish. His best time in the 100 yard dash was 9.8 seconds.

During the Auburn loss in 1955, Davis seriously injured his knee and would have to miss the North Texas State and Alabama games. The week of the Alabama game, thousands of leaflets were dropped from an airplane onto the Mississippi State campus. The message was "Beat Bama Win for Arthur" to encourage the students and football team as they traveled to Tuscaloosa for Bama's Homecoming. The Bulldogs prevailed 26–7. Bart Starr was the Crimson Tide quarterback, and he and Davis would be teammates in the Blue-Gray Game later that year.

As told by longtime Miss. State football announcer, Jack Cristil, in MSU's Alumnus Magazine in 1969 and again in Sid Salter's book, "Jack Cristil: Voice of the Bulldogs" published in 2011: "Arthur Davis to me personifies Mississippi State students and athletes. I knew him when he was a youngster in high school in Clarksdale. Watched him grow up and remember the first play of his senior year as a high school performer. He caught a pass in the flat and broke his leg. This would have broken the spirit of many young men, but not Arthur Davis. He came to Mississippi State as a tremendous performer, earned All American honors as he should have, played in his senior year badly crippled and injured but certainly gave it – as the coaches always say – that 110 percent effort on and off the field. He has been a true gentleman throughout his life ... I've always thought of Arthur Davis as being what I would like to think of as typically Mississippi State in every way."

Davis was voted "Mr. Mississippi State" by the students and was a member of the Sigma Chi fraternity. After his senior season, Davis and was selected to play in the 1955 Blue-Gray Game (Gray team captain, 2 interceptions), the 1956 Senior Bowl, and the 1956 College All-Star Game vs. the Cleveland Browns. He is a member of the Mississippi State Athletic Hall of Fame (1971) and the Mississippi Sports Hall of Fame (1981). In 2004, Davis was named to the SEC Football Legends at the SEC Championship Game in Atlanta, Georgia. He is a "Mississippi Football Legend" by the Jackson Touchdown Club. In 2018, Davis and Walt Harris were enshrined into Mississippi State football's "Ring of Honor" adding their names to the facade of Davis Wade Stadium. They joined former Bulldog greats Jack Cristil, Jackie Parker, Shorty McWilliams, D.D. Lewis, Kent Hull, Johnie Cooks, and Joe Fortunato.

Art's older brother, Harper Davis, was an all-SEC, four-year starter at Mississippi State. Harper is also a member of the Mississippi State Athletic Hall of Fame, the State of Mississippi Sports Hall of Fame, and is a 2002 SEC Football Legends inductee. He played professionally for the Los Angeles Dons, Chicago Bears and Green Bay Packers and was later the Head Football Coach at Millsaps College (1964–1988) in Jackson, Mississippi.

== Professional career ==
In the 1956 NFL draft., Davis was selected in the first round (fifth overall) by the Pittsburgh Steelers. He was limited during his rookie season in 1956 by an injured shoulder which he suffered in the College All-Star Game vs. the Cleveland Browns as well as a knee injury he sustained in college and again with the Steelers. The knee injury would also sideline him for the 1957 season. He announced his retirement from football prior to the 1958 season.

== Coaching career ==
After professional football, Davis started his coaching career at Biloxi High School in 1957. He then became an assistant coach at LSU under Coach Paul Dietzel in 1959 and 1960, and was the freshman coach at Georgia Tech under Coach Bobby Dodd in 1961 and 1962. Davis was hired as the defensive backfield coach at the University of Texas in 1963, and in that season under Coach Darrell Royal, the Longhorns won the National Championship and then beat Navy, 28–6, in the 1964 Cotton Bowl. He retired from college coaching after that season to pursue business opportunities in Mississippi and spend more time with his family. Later in life, Davis coached at Lee Academy in Clarksdale, Mississippi and Central Catholic High School in Portland, Oregon.

== Personal ==
Davis was married to the former Frances Habig of Jackson, Mississippi, for 58 years until her death in 2014. They have two children, four grandchildren, and four great grandchildren. Art's son, Doug, played tennis at Mississippi State in the early 1980s and grandson, Brad Jones, played first base and was team captain for the Bulldog baseball team in the early 2000s. The Davises are relatives of the Ganong Bros. candy-making family based in St. Stephen New Brunswick, Canada. Art lived in Oregon from 2001 to 2020 then moved to Starkville, MS later that year.

He died of Parkinson's disease on January 29, 2021, in Starkville, Mississippi, at age 86.
