= Sunflower River Blues & Gospel Festival =

American music festival

- Genre: Blues, R&B, gospel
- Locations: Clarksdale, Mississippi, U.S.
- Years active: 1988–present
- Founders: Jim O'Neal and Dr. Patricia Johnson
- Website: sunflowerfest.org

The Sunflower River Blues & Gospel Festival is an annual music festival in Clarksdale, Mississippi. It is held the second weekend in August, lasting three days. Created as the Sunflower Riverbank Blues Festival in 1988, the festival features veteran and homegrown performers, attracting blues enthusiast from all over the world. Headliners have included Otis Rush, Ike Turner, Little Milton, Bobby Bland, Bobby Rush, Koko Taylor, Denise LaSalle, Super Chikan, and Robert Plant.

== History ==
The Sunflower Riverbank Blues Festival was funded by The Downtown Association of Clarksdale partnered with the Mississippi Delta Arts Council, WROX radio, Delta Blues Museum, Rooster Blues Records, City of Clarksdale, Cahoma County Chamber of Commerce, and Sunflower River Yacht Club. The event was and organized by Living Blues co-founder Jim O'Neal and Dr. Patricia Johnson in 1988. It took place on the banks of the Sunflower River and was filmed by Mississippi Educational Television (ETV). Since then, the festival has been organized by the Sunflower River Blues Association, funded by the Mississippi Arts Commission and the National Endowment for the Arts.

In 1991, the Early Wright Blues Heritage Award was established to honor Early Wright, "The Soul Man" of WROX radio who was Mississippi's first black radio disc jockey.

In 1992, promoters Melville Tillis and Julius Guy held the Issaquena Gospel Festival. In 1993, the two festivals were merged into the Sunflower River Blues & Gospel festival. Tillis became co-chairman of the association. Guy died in 1993, and in 1994, the Julius Guy Gospel Heritage Award was created in his honor.

For the first time in 2012, the festival sold V.I.P tickets, for headliners Robert Plant and the Sensational Space Shifters, generating funds for subsequent festivals. Also in 2012, the Sunflower River Blues & Gospel Festival was recognized with a marker on the Mississippi Blues Trail.

== Headliners ==
Year	Headliners	Notes
1988	James "Son" Thomas & Otis Rush	Inaugural event funded primarily by merchants in Clarksdale area and organized by Jim O'Neal and Dr. Patricia Johnson
1989	Bobby Rush & Big Jack Johnson	Funded largely by individual donors. The Williams Brothers was the featured gospel act
1990	Various artists	Performers included Big George Brock, Sam & Doris Carr, Johnnie Billington, and Patrick Murphy
1991	Otis Clay & Big Jack Johnson	Performers included Sam & Doris Carr, Stone Gas Band, Clayton Love, and Wade Walton
1992	Katie Webster, Big Jack Johnson & The Jelly Roll Kings	Performers included Pinetop Perkins, Snooky Pryor, and Lonnie Pitchford
1993	Booba Barnes & Junior Kimbrough	First year for the Gospel Festival. Event included stars from the motion picture film Deep Blues
1994	Bobby Rush & The Williams Brothers	Performers included Maxwell Street Jimmy Davis
1995	Denise LaSalle, Charlie Musselwhite & Frank Frost	Performers included Sam Carr, Lonnie Pitchford, Jack Owens, Bud Spires & The Jackson Southernaires
1996	Bobby Rush	Performers included Lonnie Shields, Charlie Musselwhite, Robert "Bilbo" Walker, Willie Neal Johnson & The Gospel Keynotes
1997	Little Milton & Ike Turner	Performers included Big Jack Johnson, Clayton Love, Frank Frost & Sam Carr, Slim & the Supreme Angels & Delta Big Four
1998	Rufus Thomas, Lynn White & R.L. Burnside	Performers included Big Jack Johnson, The Kinsey Report, Charlie Musselwhite, Lonnie Pitchford
1999	Otis Clay, Charlie Musselwhite, & Eddie Campbell	Performers included Super Chikan, Frank Frost, Sam Carr, Othar Turner, Johnny & The Midniters
2000	Koko Taylor & Bobby Rush	Performers included The JT Express with Arthniece Jones, the Stone Gas Man, "Tater" Foster Wiley, Blind Mississippi Morris
2001	The Pilgrim Jubilees	Performers included James Williams and The Messengers, Yolanda Troupe-Williams
2002	Charlie Musselwhite and Bobby "Blue" Bland	Tribute to Little Junior Parker. Performers included Big Jack Johnson, O.B. Buchana, The Jackson Southernaires
2003	Latimore, T-Model Ford, Big Jack Johnson, Sam Carr	A tribute to Othar Turner featured a documentary by filmmaker Scott Jennison with music by Othar Turner's granddaughter, Shardé Thomas
2004	Latimore, T-Model Ford, Big Jack Johnson, Sam Carr	Performers included Latimore, Super Chikan, T-Model Ford, Big Jack Johnson & the Oilers, Nelson Larkins & God's Possey of Chicago
2005	Charlie Musselwhite & Shirley Brown	Performers included Robert Belfour, Big T & The Family, David "Honeyboy" Edwards, Rev. Andrew Cheairs & The Songbirds
2006	North Mississippi Allstars, Latimore	Performers included Super Chikan, Big George Brock, Wesley Jefferson, Jimbo Mathus
2007	Bobby Rush and Denise LaSalle	Performers included Howlin' Madd Bill Perry, Rita Engedalen & Spoonful, Shardee Turner, Billy Rivers & The Angelic Voices of Faith
2008	Darrell McFadden & the Disciples	Performers included Bill Howlin' Madd Perry, Cadillac John & Bill Abel, Arthniece "Gas Man" Jones, and Shemekia Copeland, Selvy Singers
2009	Bettye Lavette and Super Chikan	Performers included George Horn and South of Memphis, James "Super Chikan" Johnson, T-Model Ford, Chapel Hill's Mens Chorus
2010	Johnny Rawls and Homemade Jamz Blues Band	This year's festival was a tribute to Ike Turner & "Rocket 88"
2011	Dorothy Moore and Johnny Rawls	Performers included David Brinston, Nathaniel Kimble, Super Chikan, Earnest "Guitar" Roy, Kenny Brown, Robert Belfour, Eddie Cusic
2012	Robert Plant with special guest Patty Griffin	Performers included T-Model Ford, Eddie Cusic, Robert Belfor, Pat Thomas, Arthniece Jones, Charlie Musselwhite, Bobby Rush
2013	Bobby Rush and North Mississippi Allstars	This year's festival was dedicated to the late Melville Tillis, owner of the Rivermount Lounge
2014	Various artists	This year's festival was dedicated to the legacy of Big Jack Johnson
2015	William Bell and Rita Engedalen	Performers included Leo "Bud" Welch, Sharde Turner, Jimmy "Duck" Holmes, Super Chikan, Terry "Big T" Williams & The Family Band
2016	Super Chikan and Lonnie Shields	Performers included Heavy Suga & the Sweet Tones, Josh "Razorblade" Stewart, Jimbo Mathus, Little Willie Farmer, Leo "Bud" Welch
2017	Charlie Musselwhite and O.B. Buchana	Performers included Jimmy "Duck" Holmes, Lucious Spiller, Watermelon Slim, Rich "Daddy Rich" Crisman, The DBM Band and Ghalia Vaultier
2018	Christone "Kingstone" Ingram and O.B. Buchana	
2019	Super Chikan and Anthony “Big A” Sherrod & The All Stars	
