= South Side High School (Memphis, Tennessee) =

Former high school Tennessee, United States

Coordinates: 35.1105°N 90.0403°W

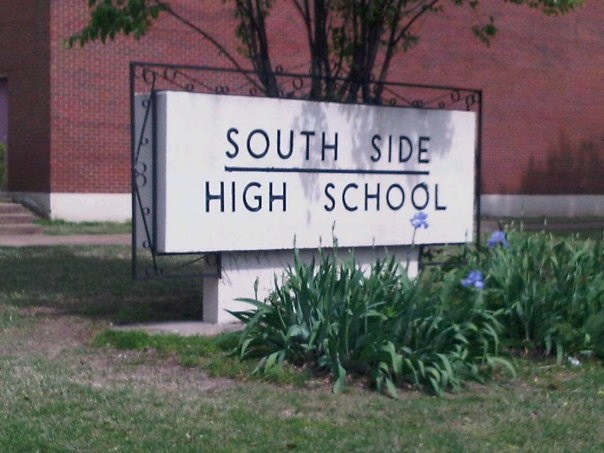
South side school

South Side High School was a public high school located in Memphis, Tennessee and was part of the Memphis City Schools system. In 2007 its location became the home of a specialized school, the South Side Health Career Academy. It was designed by Charles O. Pfeil and George Awsumb.

== Notable alumni ==
- Abe Fortas (SSHS '26), Justice of the Supreme Court of the United States
- Carlton Kent, Sergeant Major of the Marine Corps
- Marv Throneberry, baseball player
