= Johney Brooks =

American educator

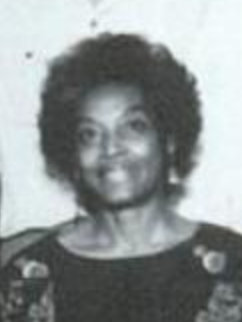
- Johney Brooks, from a 1992 publication of the US State Department
- Born: February 7, 1933; Clarksdale, Mississippi
- Died: October 1, 2016 (aged 83); Lake Katrine, New York
- Occupations: Educator, Peace Corps official

Johney Brooks (February 7, 1933 – October 1, 2016) was an American educator, who worked for the US Department of State and the Peace Corps, mainly in Africa but also at embassies in Turkmenistan and Papua New Guinea.

== Early life and education ==
Brooks was born in Clarksdale, Mississippi, the daughter of sharecroppers Thomas A. Johnson and Beulah Johnson. She was raised in Texas and California. After a time in the military, she earned a bachelor's degree in biology from California State University, Los Angeles, earned a master's degree in chemistry at the University of Arizona, and trained as a teacher. She completed doctoral studies in international and comparative education at the University of California, Los Angeles (UCLA).

== Career ==
Brooks joined the United States Air Force in 1951, during the Korean War, and was honorably discharged in 1953. She was a chemist in Los Angeles, taught high school in Los Angeles and Compton, worked as a school administrator in Sacramento and Pomona, and was an assistant professor at Humboldt State University.

From 1969 to 1971, Brooks taught science teachers for USAID in Uganda. From 1982 to 1985, she was the appointed director of Peace Corps work in Gambia. She worked at the Bahá'i World Centre in Haifa. She held embassy posts in Tunisia, Niger, Sierra Leone, Guyana, Turkmenistan, and Papua New Guinea.

== Personal life ==
Brooks was an adherent of the Bahá'i faith. She had two children: her daughter Alexis Brooks de Vita is a professor of English at Texas Southern University, and her son W. Abdullah Brooks is a public health physician on the faculty at Johns Hopkins Bloomberg School of Public Health. Brooks died from complications of a stroke in 2016, in Lake Katrine, New York, aged 83 years.
