= Temple B'nai Israel (Tupelo, Mississippi) =

Synagogue in Mississippi

- Location in Mississippi

Religion
- Affiliation: Reform Judaism
- Ecclesiastical or organisational status: Synagogue
- Leadership: Lay–led
- Status: Active

Location
- Location: 1301 Marshall Street, Tupelo, Mississippi 38802
- Country: United States
- Coordinates: 34°16′15″N 88°43′26″W

Architecture
- Established: 1939 (as a congregation)
- Completed: 1957

Website
- shalomtupelo.org

Temple B'nai Israel is a Reform Jewish congregation and synagogue, located at 1301 Marshall Street, in Tupelo, Lee County, Mississippi, in the United States. The congregation was established in 1939.

As of 2020, about 35 families were active in the synagogue.

== History ==
At the beginning of the Great Depression Tupelo had only 20 Jewish residents, out of 20,000 total residents.

Temple B'nai Israel in Tupelo was established on August 24, 1939, with Sol Weiner as its first President. The congregation first met in Tupelo City Hall. In 1945, the congregation added a holy ark, and was given its first Torah by the Vine Street Temple in Nashville, Tennessee. It later rented space on South Spring Street above the Fooks' Chevrolet dealership. In 1949, a student rabbi from Hebrew Union College in Cincinnati, Ohio, conducted Temple services for the high holidays. In 1953, it moved to space over Biggs Furniture Store.

A synagogue building was dedicated on September 1, 1957, with then-Mayor James Ballard giving the remarks. The building was funded by Manny Davis, an Okolona sportswear manufacturing businessman, local banks, manufacturing companies, and other businesses, the local community, Jews from across the nation, and 41 percent by Gentiles.

== Leadership ==
Due to its modest size, the Temple does not have a full-time rabbi, and instead uses a lay leader. Maury Stein was a lay leader of the congregation in the 1960s. Marc Perler has served as a lay leader of the synagogue.

As of 1955 Maurice Stein (who owned a dress shop on Main Street) was president of the synagogue, Len Shane and Linda Levy were later president of the temple, and as of 2020 Leslie Mart was president of Temple B’Nai Israel. Ron Baker has served as the congregation's Director of Religious Education. Gloria Lenhoff has served as the cantor.

== Notable members ==
- Alan Mark Bank, Tupelo's 2010 Outstanding Citizen of the Year
- Jack Cristil, Mississippi State University Bulldog broadcaster, served as lay leader in 2011

== See also ==
- History of the Jews in the United States
- National Register of Historic Places listings in Lee County, Mississippi
