= Vera Pigee =

American civil rights activist (1924–2007)

- Born: Vera Mae Berry; 1924; Tutwiler, Mississippi
- Died: 2007 (aged 82–83)
- Education: Wayne State University
- Occupations: activist, beautician, author, speaker

Vera Pigee (1924–2007), was an American civil rights worker in Clarksdale, Mississippi.

She served as branch secretary to the Coahoma County chapter of the NAACP, a chapter she helped organize with civil rights leader Aaron Henry. She was an advisor to the Mississippi state NAACP Youth Council. She also served as the supervisor to her region's Citizenship Schools, which held classes on voter registration for African-Americans. Pigee was a fierce integrationist. With fellow NAACP members, she played a pivotal role in desegregating the Clarksdale Bus Terminal in 1961. Ben C. Collins, the Clarksdale chief of police, called her "the most aggressive leader of the NAACP in Clarksdale."

Vera Pigee owned a beauty shop and her income didn't depend on the white community, so being an activist didn't cause her to lose her job. In addition, in 1963 she got harassed because of using the "white-only bathroom".

After earning her doctorate in journalism, she chronicled her work with the NAACP in her first book, Struggle of Struggles: Part I. A street in Clarksdale bears her name.
