= Josie Childs =

American civic leader and community activist (1926–2023)

- Born: October 13, 1926; Clarksdale, Mississippi, US
- Died: February 13, 2023 (aged 96)
- Occupations: Civic leader and community activist

Josie Brown Childs (October 13, 1926 – February 13, 2023) was an American civic leader and community activist. Childs worked closely with several politicians, including Harold Washington (in office, 1983–1987), Chicago's first mayor of African American descent. She long worked to increase African American participation in the city through community organizing and local politics. Childs founded the Harold Washington Tribute Committee in 2013 and was known as the "Matriarch of the Movement".

== Early life and education ==
Childs was born in Clarksdale, Mississippi, on October 13, 1926, to Julia Brown and Charles Washington. She was raised in Memphis, Tennessee, and Vicksburg, Mississippi. After attending LeMoyne–Owen College in Memphis, Childs continued her education at the Cortez W. Peters Business College. In the late 1940s, she also enrolled in business courses at Northwestern University in Chicago. In 1968, she wed James (Jack) Childs, and they had four children. The couple owned Chicago accounting firm J.M. Childs and Associates.

== Career ==
Childs worked for the City of Chicago, initially in the Sixth Ward under Bob Miller's sponsorship, and later as an events coordinator for Colonel Jack Riley. She worked at the Metropolitan School of Tailoring as an administrator as well. In 1959, she was a member of the group that hosted Queen Elizabeth II in Chicago. Childs later collaborated with Harold Washington on his mayoral campaigns in 1977 and 1983. For many years, she also served as Mayor Washington's assistant. Childs faced seven men when she ran for the 5th Ward aldermanic seat in 1983. To protest the exclusion of Hyde Park residents from the 5th Ward Democrats' campaign, she ran as an independent but lost the election. From 1983 until 1990, Childs served as an administrator in the City of Chicago's Cultural Affairs and Special Events divisions at City Hall. She created and promoted a number of events after her work with the City of Chicago, including one honoring African American naval musicians from the Great Lakes. She organized the 16th Annual Duke Ellington Conference in 1998, which included the first performance of his musical "My People" since its 1963 premiere. Additionally, she assisted in planning the Great Lakes Naval Station's 2003 Great Lakes Experience Reunion Weekend.

She worked to increase African American participation in the city through community organizing and local politics. She coordinated events with multiple organizations, including Planned Parenthood, and the NAACP. Childs also worked for Harold Washington, Ralph Metcalfe, and Abner Mikva's congressional campaigns. She worked as an organizer in Illinois for the presidential campaigns of Jimmy Carter, Lyndon B. Johnson, John F. Kennedy, and Adlai Stevenson II. She also attended the 1980 Democratic National Convention in New York City as a Democratic delegate.

Childs founded the Harold Washington Tribute Committee in 2013 and worked to preserve the legacy of Harold Washington, the first African American mayor of Chicago. She belonged to numerous organizations. She served on the boards of the Christ Hospital Nursing School and the National Council for Lay Life and Work. Congressman Danny K. Davis presented Childs with the Georgia Palmer Award in 2013. She gave the Chicago Public Library the "Josie Brown Childs Papers", which are a collection of records pertaining to her political activities, family history, and her attempts to raise awareness of African American culture and history. In 2019, Childs and five other Chicago civil rights activists were honored with an exhibit at the DuSable Museum of African American History.

== Death ==
At the age of 96, Childs died on February 13, 2023. Childs received a church service in Chicago to recognize her life as "a champion of African American rights". The South Side Drive Magazine wrote, "Given all that she contributed to the Black community, it is so fitting that this woman who treasured the preservation of Black History should choose to join the ancestors on the 13th day of Black History Month." The Illinois Senate said,

Josie Childs' legacy will live on through her donation to the Chicago Public Library of the Josie Brown Childs Papers, a collection of documents consisting of her family history, her political work, and her efforts to promote African American cultural and historical awareness; she will be remembered as deserving of the title "Matriarch of the Movement".
