= William R. Moore Dry Goods Building =

- U.S. National Register of Historic Places
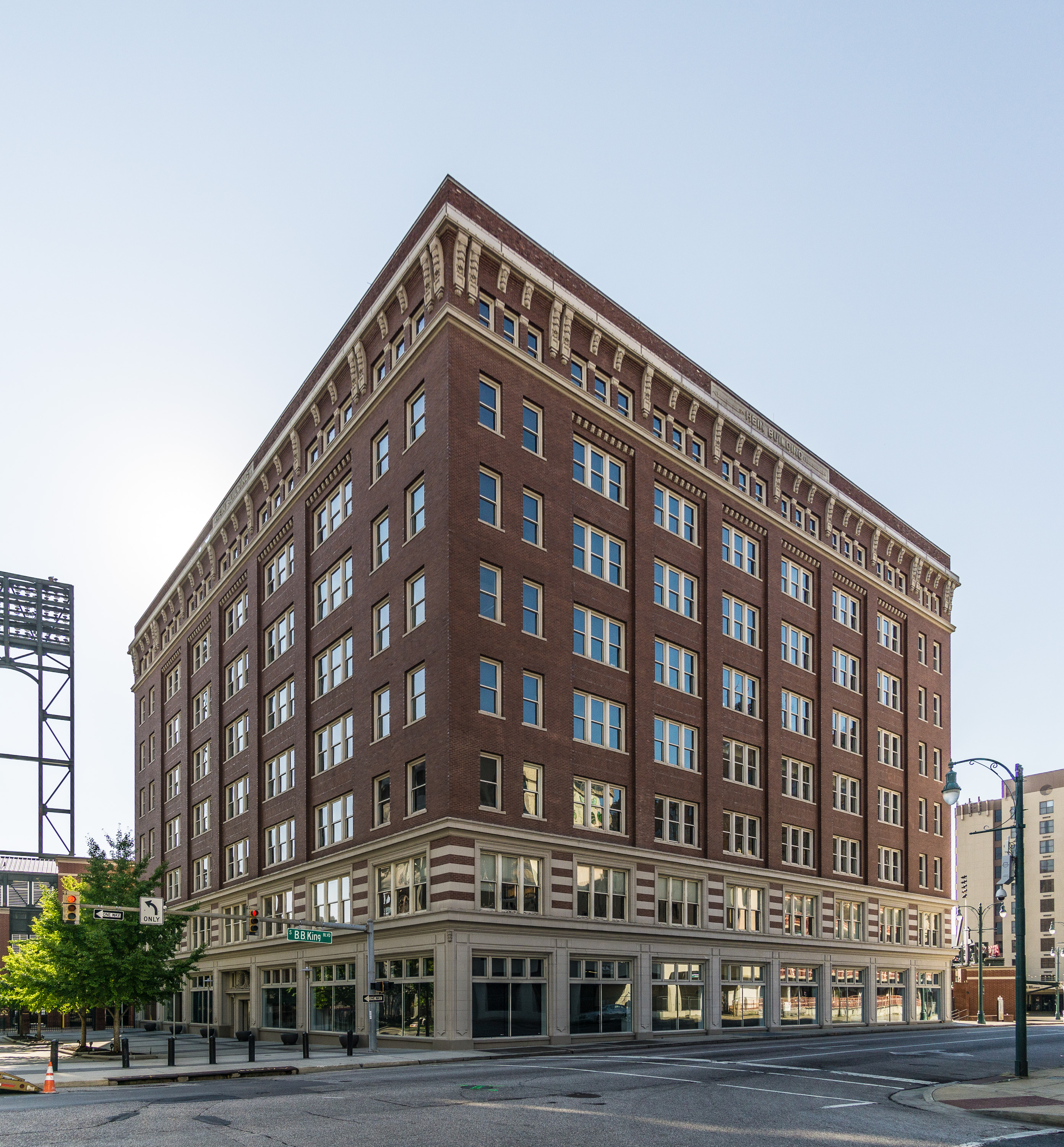
- The William R. Moore Dry Goods Building in 2016

- Location within Tennessee Location within the United States
- Location: 183 Monroe Avenue, Memphis, Tennessee
- Coordinates: 35°8′34″N 90°3′1″W
- Area: 0.5 acres (0.20 ha)
- Built: 1913
- Architect: Charles O. Pfeil
- Architectural style: Chicago
- NRHP reference No.: 82004049
- Added to NRHP: August 26, 1982

The William R. Moore Dry Goods Building is a historic building in Memphis, Tennessee, U.S.. It was built in 1913 for the William R. Moore Dry Goods company, founded in 1859, and designed by prominent Memphis architect Charles O. Pfeil. It has been listed on the National Register of Historic Places since August 26, 1982.
