= John Clark (Clarksdale founder) =

American lumberman, farmer, investor and landowner (1823–1892)

John Clark

John Clark (March 20, 1823 – July 23, 1892) was a landowner, investor, farmer, founder and namesake of Clarksdale, Mississippi. He was the brother-in-law of Mississippi Governor James Lusk Alcorn.

== Life ==
Born in Lancashire, England, Clark moved to the United States in 1839 at the age of 16. He purchased 101 acres of land bordering the Sunflower River favouring its fertility. It was on this land that the town of Clarksdale came to be. He married Eliza Jane Alcorn and together they had 8 children. He died on July 23, 1892 and is buried in the local cemetery.

== See also ==
- John Clark House (Clarksdale, Mississippi)
