= Riverside Hotel (Clarksdale, Mississippi) =

Hotel in Mississippi, United States

Coordinates: 34.195174°N 90.572551°W

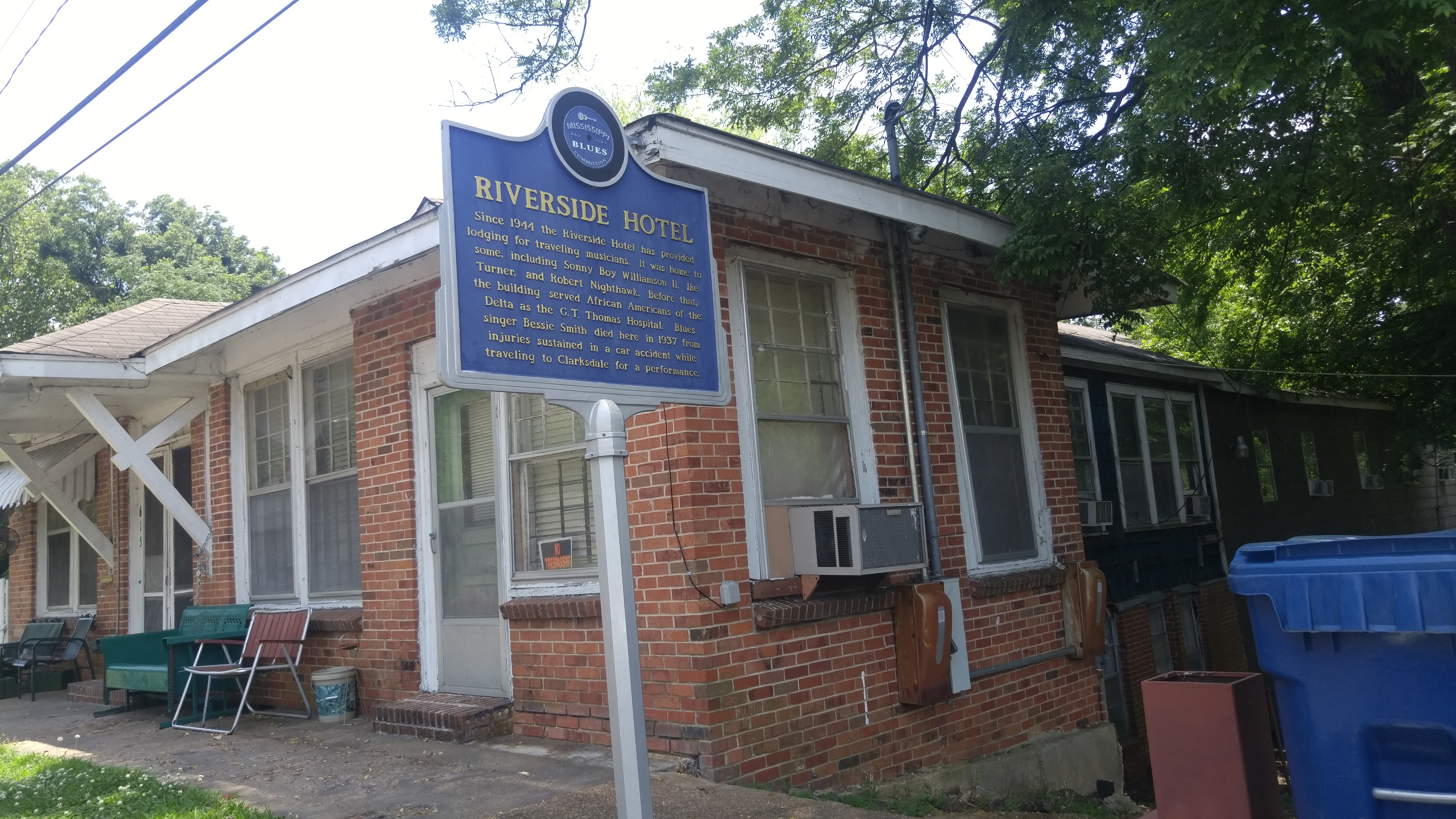
Riverside Hotel Blues Trail marker

Riverside Hotel was a hotel in Clarksdale, Mississippi, in operation from 1944 to 2020. The fourth marker location on the Mississippi Blues Trail, famed for providing lodging for such blues artists as Sonny Boy Williamson II, Ike Turner, and Robert Nighthawk, it was previously the G.T. Thomas Hospital, in which Bessie Smith died in 1937.

== History ==
The Riverside Hotel is located at 615 Sunflower Avenue, in Clarksdale, Mississippi. Its original usage was as the G. T. Thomas Afro-American Hospital, Clarksdale's hospital for black patients. On September 26, 1937, the singer Bessie Smith was taken to the hospital treatment after a car accident outside Clarksdale, which proved fatal.

In 1943, Mrs. Z.L. Ratliff rented the eight-room structure from G.T. Thomas for use as a hotel. Ratliff subsequently extended the building to include 21 guest rooms over two floors, with Thomas assisting in the conversion. Ratliff purchased the building outright from Thomas's widow in 1957, and the structure has remained in the hands of the Ratliff family since. Run by Frank "Rat" Ratliff for several years prior to his death on March 28, 2013, the hotel was owned and operated by Ratfliff's daughter, Zelena "Zee" Ratliff, until its closure in March 2020.

== Notable residents ==
As one of the few hotels in the state that allowed African-Americans, the Riverside played host to a great number of touring musicians, including Sonny Boy Williamson II and Duke Ellington.

At some point in the mid-1940s, Ike Turner moved into the Riverside Hotel; his bedroom, in which he reportedly wrote and rehearsed his song "Rocket 88," is said to have been what is now room #7.

Additionally, Robert Nighthawk left his suitcase in his room at the Riverside just before he died.

== See also ==
- Delta Blues Museum
- Ground Zero Blues Club
- Mississippi Blues Trail
- John Clark House
