= Congregation Ohabai Sholom (Nashville, Tennessee) =

Reform synagogue in Nashville, Tennessee, US

- Location in Tennessee

Religion
- Affiliation: Reform Judaism
- Ecclesiastical or organizational status: Synagogue
- Status: Active

Location
- Location: 5015 Harding Pike, Nashville, Tennessee 37205
- Country: United States
- Interactive map of Congregation Ohabai Sholom
- Coordinates: 36°06′28″N 86°51′52″W

Architecture
- Type: Synagogue
- Founder: Mr. and Mrs. Isaac Garretson
- Established: c. 1840s (as a congregation)
- Completed: 1874 (Vine Street); 1955 (current site)

Website
- templenashville.org

Congregation Ohabai Sholom, known as The Temple, is a Reform Jewish synagogue located at 5015 Harding Pike, in Nashville, Tennessee, in the United States. Founded in the 1840s, the congregation is notable for the elaborate, Moorish Revival Vine Street Temple that was its home from 1874 until its demolition in 1954; replaced by its current synagogue the following year.

== History ==
Ohabai Sholom was founded as an Orthodox congregation in the 1840s in the home of Mr. and Mrs. Isaac Garretson on South Summer Street (5th Avenue). The congregation purchased land for a cemetery in 1851 and in 1874 dedicated the striking, Moorish Revival Vine Street Temple. In 1873 the congregation was one of the founding members of the Union of American Hebrew Congregations, now the Union for Reform Judaism. In 1945, the Temple gave Temple B'nai Israel in Tupelo, Mississippi, its first Torah.

The congregation moved to its present building in 1955. Rabbi Randall Falk, who served as Senior Rabbi at the Temple from 1960 to 1986, led local clergy in Civil Rights marches and was a founding member of the Metro (Nashville) Human Relations Commission, which was established to promote integration and Civil Rights.

== Notable members ==
- Herb Rich (1928-2008), a former professional NFL football player
- Dinah Shore, famed Big Band singer and national television personality from the 1940s through 1970s
