= Herb Rich =

American football player (1928–2008)

No. 87, 42, 27
- Position: Defensive back

Personal information
- Born: October 7, 1928; Newark, New Jersey, U.S.
- Died: March 28, 2008 (aged 79); Nashville, Tennessee, U.S.
- Listed height: 5 ft 11 in (1.80 m)
- Listed weight: 181 lb (82 kg)

Career information
- High school: Miami Beach (Miami Beach, Florida)
- College: Vanderbilt
- NFL draft: 1951: 2nd round, 24th overall pick

Career history
- Baltimore Colts (1950); Los Angeles Rams (1951–1953); New York Giants (1954–1956)

Awards and highlights
- 2× NFL champion (1951, 1956); 2× Second-team All-SEC (1948, 1949)

Career NFL statistics
- Interceptions: 29
- Fumble recoveries: 14
- Total touchdowns: 4
- Stats at Pro Football Reference

Richard Herbert Rich (October 7, 1928 – March 28, 2008) was an All-Pro American football safety in the National Football League (NFL) for the Baltimore Colts, Los Angeles Rams and New York Giants.

== Early and personal life ==
Rich was born in Newark, New Jersey, and was Jewish. He graduated from Miami Beach High School in Florida.

He was married to the former Carla Blocker, and they had a son, Jonathan, and two daughters, Terry and Tracey. The family lived in Nashville, Tennessee.

== College career ==
He played college football at Vanderbilt University, as well as basketball and baseball, and was president of his class. In football, he earned All-SEC honors at tailback, rushing for 1,282 yards during the 1948–49 seasons.

== Professional career ==
Rich was drafted in the sixth round of the 1950 NFL draft, and played defensive back and returned punts during his career. In his rookie season he averaged 23 yards on 12 punt returns, an NFL record that stood for over 50 years. He was a two-time All-Pro defensive back.

In 65 career games, he had 29 career interceptions, including three for touchdowns. In 1992, he was elected to the Tennessee Sports Hall of Fame. Rich also became Vanderbilt's seventh "SEC Football Legend".

== Personal life ==
Rich was a 1954 graduate of Vanderbilt Law School. After his football career ended, Rich was an attorney in Nashville. He was president of the Nashville Jewish Community Center in 1971–72, and was a board member of Temple Ohabai Sholom in Nashville.

Rich died at 79 years of age in 2008.

== See also ==
- List of select Jewish football players
