= Jack Cristil =

American sportscaster

- Born: Jacob Sanford Cristil; December 10, 1925; Memphis, Tennessee, U.S.
- Died: September 7, 2014 (aged 88); Tupelo, Mississippi, U.S.
- Occupation: radio sports broadcaster
- Years active: 1947–2011
- Spouse: Mavis Cristil (d. 1988)
- Children: 2

Jacob Sanford "Jack" Cristil (December 10, 1925 – September 7, 2014) was the long-time radio voice of Mississippi State University Bulldog men's basketball and football. Over his 58-year tenure (1953–2011), Cristil called 636 football games (or roughly 63% of all football games played by Mississippi State) and 1,538 basketball games (or roughly 55% of all basketball games played by Mississippi State).

== Early life and career ==
Born in Memphis, Tennessee to Latvian and Russian Jewish immigrants, Cristil listened to radio stations from Pittsburgh, St. Louis, and Chicago at a young age and knew then he wanted to be a radio broadcaster.

In 1947, Cristil studied Broadcast Journalism at the University of Minnesota before moving back home to Memphis. Shortly thereafter, Cristil began his radio play-by-play career calling Minor League Baseball in various places such as Jackson, Tennessee; Anniston, Alabama; and Memphis, Tennessee. He then moved to Clarksdale, Mississippi, to call Clarksdale High School football games.

Cristil submitted an audition tape to then MSU Athletic Director C.R. "Dudy" Noble in August 1953. In September 1953, Cristil began calling Mississippi State football games. His first play-by-play was a 34–6 Mississippi State win over the University of Memphis. In that game, future SEC Player of the Year and All American, Art Davis would score the first touchdown Cristil ever called in his Mississippi State broadcasting career. On September 26, 1956 as Elvis Presley returned to Tupelo to perform two shows at the Mississippi-Alabama Fair and Dairy Show, he was interviewed, in between shows by Cristil.

In 1957, Cristil began calling play-by-play for men's basketball. His first was a win over Union University in Jackson, Tennessee, the city where he began his broadcasting career.

Cristil was best known for ending a Bulldog victory by saying, "Wrap it in maroon and white!"

== Retirement ==
Cristil announced his retirement after the men's basketball game against University of Tennessee on February 23, 2011. He cited health issues as his reason for stepping down after 58 years. He addressed the fans after the broadcast for almost two minutes, expressing thanks and appreciation to the Mississippi State fan base. Jim Ellis, who had called Bulldog baseball since 1979, succeeded him.

In 2011, Cristil was the lay leader of the Temple B'nai Israel in Tupelo, Mississippi.

Cristil died September 7, 2014, at the age of 88 at Sanctuary Hospice House in Tupelo of complications from kidney disease and cancer.

== Awards and achievements ==
- Southeastern Conference Broadcaster of the Year – 1988
- 21 times named Mississippi Broadcaster of the Year
- 1991 Inductee of Mississippi Sports Hall of Fame
- Ronald Reagan Lifetime Achievement Award
- 1997 Chris Schenkel Award given by the College Football Hall of Fame
