= Marshall Drew =

American singer-songwriter

- Born: Marshall Williamson Drew; January 11, 1984 (age 42); Clarksdale, Mississippi, United States
- Genres: Folk rock, Americana, rock
- Occupations: Musician, singer-songwriter
- Instruments: Vocals, guitar, bass guitar, drums
- Years active: 2009–present
- Spouse: Haley Drew (married 2008-present)

Marshall Drew (born January 11, 1984) is an American folk rock singer-songwriter from Clarksdale, Mississippi. He released his independent debut album, A Million Different Shades, in 2009.

== Biography ==
Marshall Drew was born on January 11, 1984, in Clarksdale, Mississippi. He took an interest in music at a young age, learning to play guitar at age five and beginning to write songs at eight. He played in several local bands during his teens, often performing blues music throughout the Mississippi Delta. Drew, however, cites classic rock-era singer-songwriters such as Bob Dylan, Bruce Springsteen and Neil Young as his primary influences. He is also heavily influenced by highly melodic rock bands such as The Beatles and Big Star.

Drew released A Million Different Shades, his debut independent album, in 2009 to generally positive reviews, receiving comparisons to Springsteen, Dylan and Tom Petty and earning praise for its lyrics and musical hooks. Drew wrote and produced the album himself as well as playing most of the instruments, including vocals, guitars, drums, harmonica and organ.
