= Lee Academy (Mississippi) =

Segregation academy in Mississippi

Location
- Clarksdale, Mississippi; Mississippi Delta; 34.220959°N 90.5878866°W

Information
- Opened: 1970
- Grades: 7-12
- Website: www.leeacademycolts.org
- Last updated: 2 December 2017

Lee Academy is a grade 7–12 private school in Clarksdale, Mississippi. The school opened in 1970 as a segregation academy, with an initial enrollment of 654 students. In 1970, when Clarksdale submitted to integration, the public schools closed for an "integration break". When they reopened after a one-day hiatus, nearly all of the white students transferred to Lee or other segregation academies.

As of 1986, the school had never had a black student. The headmaster at the time, Gene Barbour, told a newspaper that the school "would admit blacks as long as they were cultured or want a college prep background. We wouldn't take any shuckers or jivers."

In 2001, Bob Ellard, the former Clarksdale Municipal School District superintendent, recalled that the opening of Lee Academy was "the worst thing that ever happened to our schools." He explained that when the public schools integrated, most white families "ran" to private schools.

Many members of the football team at Coahoma County High School transferred to Lee Academy as integration via court order was about to occur.

As of February 25, 2020, the school's official history page stated that the school was founded in part to ensure "retention of local control of policies". At the same time, the school's mission statement says that Lee "welcome[s] the application of students and staff members of any race, religion, color and/or origin and do not discriminate against individuals of such groups."

As of 2010, 92% of the students at Lee Academy were white, while at Clarksdale High School 92% were black.

== See also ==
- Coahoma Agricultural High School
