= Clarksdale Municipal School District =

School district in Mississippi, United States

Address
- 526 South Choctaw Street Clarksdale, Mississippi, (Coahoma County), 38614; United States
- Coordinates: 34.19°N 90.583°W

District information
- Type: Public school district
- Motto: Dedicated to Excellence in Education
- Grades: K–12
- Superintendent: Toya Harrell-Matthews, Ph.D.
- School board: 5 members
- Chair of the board: Bishop Zedric Clayton
- Director of education: Adrienne Hudson and Herbert Smith
- Governing agency: Mississippi Department of Education
- Schools: 9
- NCES District ID: 2801050

Students and staff
- Students: 2237 (2020–2021)
- Teachers: 167
- Staff: 334
- Student–teacher ratio: 13.4:1

Other information
- Website: www.cmsdschools.org

The Clarksdale Municipal School District (CMSD) is a public school district based in Clarksdale, Mississippi, United States.

== History ==
Around the time of racial integration, circa the 1960s, the district arranged attendance boundaries of elementary schools so de facto segregation would occur. There had been plans to build a new consolidated Clarksdale-Coahoma County High School to serve all children in Coahoma County, plans were abandoned, even though the building was already constructed, because the officials wanted to maintain segregation in a de facto manner.

== Performance ==
In 2019, "the district remains classified as low performing, bouncing between D and F every year since 2013. ...In the 2017-2018 school year, 19% of the district's teachers were not certified and – perhaps consequently – the district received an F rating." The district "has trouble retaining highly qualified educators."

== Schools ==
High schools

- Clarksdale High School
- J. W. Stampley 9th Grade Academy

Middle schools

- Oakhurst Intermediate School
- W. A. Higgins Middle School (formerly Junior High School)

Elementary schools

Each elementary school has a school theme.

- Booker T. Washington Elementary School – International Baccalaureate – Brenda Miller – principal
- George H. Oliver Elementary School – visual and performing arts
- Heidelberg Elementary School – math and science
- Kirkpatrick Elementary School – health sciences

=== Former schools ===
Former elementary schools:

- Jerome Y. Stamply Elementary School
- Myrtle Hall III Elementary School
- Myrtle Hall IV Elementary School
- Riverton Elementary School

== Demographics ==
Circa 2017, the district had about 3,200 students. Circa 2008, the district had about 3,600 students.

=== 2006-07 school year ===
There were a total of 3,603 students enrolled in the Clarksdale Municipal School District during the 2006–2007 school year. The gender makeup of the district was 50% female and 50% male. The racial makeup of the district was 94.34% African American, 4.75% White, 0.75% Asian, and 0.17% Hispanic. 89.9% of the district's students were eligible to receive free lunch.

=== Previous school years ===
School year	Enrollment	Gender makeup		Racial makeup				
School year	Enrollment	Female	Male	Asian	African American	Hispanic	Native American	White
2005-06	3,610	51%	49%	0.66%	92.96%	0.30%	–	6.07%
2004-05	3,615	50%	50%	0.50%	91.54%	0.25%	–	7.72%
2003-04	3,703	51%	49%	0.51%	90.44%	0.14%	–	8.91%
2002-03	3,726	50%	50%	0.51%	88.67%	0.16%	–	10.68%

== Accountability statistics ==
	2006-07	2005-06	2004-05	2003-04	2002-03
District accreditation status	Accredited	Accredited	Accredited	Accredited	Accredited
School performance classifications
Level 5 (Superior Performing) Schools	0	0	0	0	0
Level 4 (Exemplary) Schools	0	0	0	1	0
Level 3 (Successful) Schools	5	6	7	6	4
Level 2 (Under Performing) Schools	4	3	2	3	3
Level 1 (Low Performing) Schools	0	0	0	0	3
Not assigned	0	0	0	0	0

== See also ==
- List of school districts in Mississippi
