= WROX (AM) =

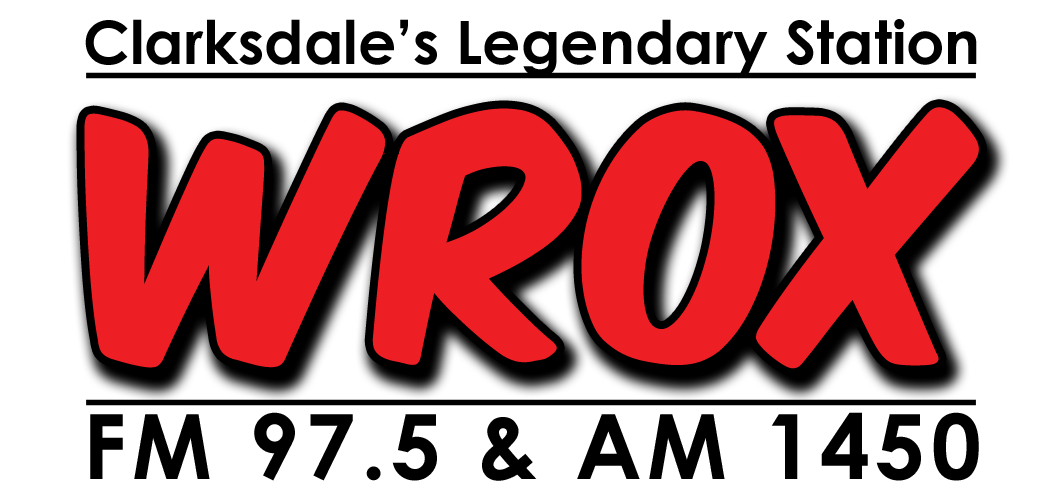
- Clarksdale, Mississippi; United States
- Broadcast area: Coahoma County, Mississippi
- Frequency: 1450 kHz

Programming
- Format: Classic hits; classic rock; blues; deep cuts
- Affiliations: Fox News Radio; Compass Media Networks; Premiere Networks

Ownership
- Owner: Terry Ballard; (WROX, LLC)

History
- First air date: June 5, 1944
- Call sign meaning: sounds like "Rocks"

Technical information
- Licensing authority: FCC
- Facility ID: 11611
- Class: C
- Power: 1,000 watts unlimited
- Transmitter coordinates: 34°12′40″N 90°34′42″W
- Translator: 97.5 W248CL (Clarksdale)

Links
- Public license information: Public file; LMS
- Webcast: Listen live
- Website: www.wroxradio.com
- WROX Building
- U.S. National Register of Historic Places
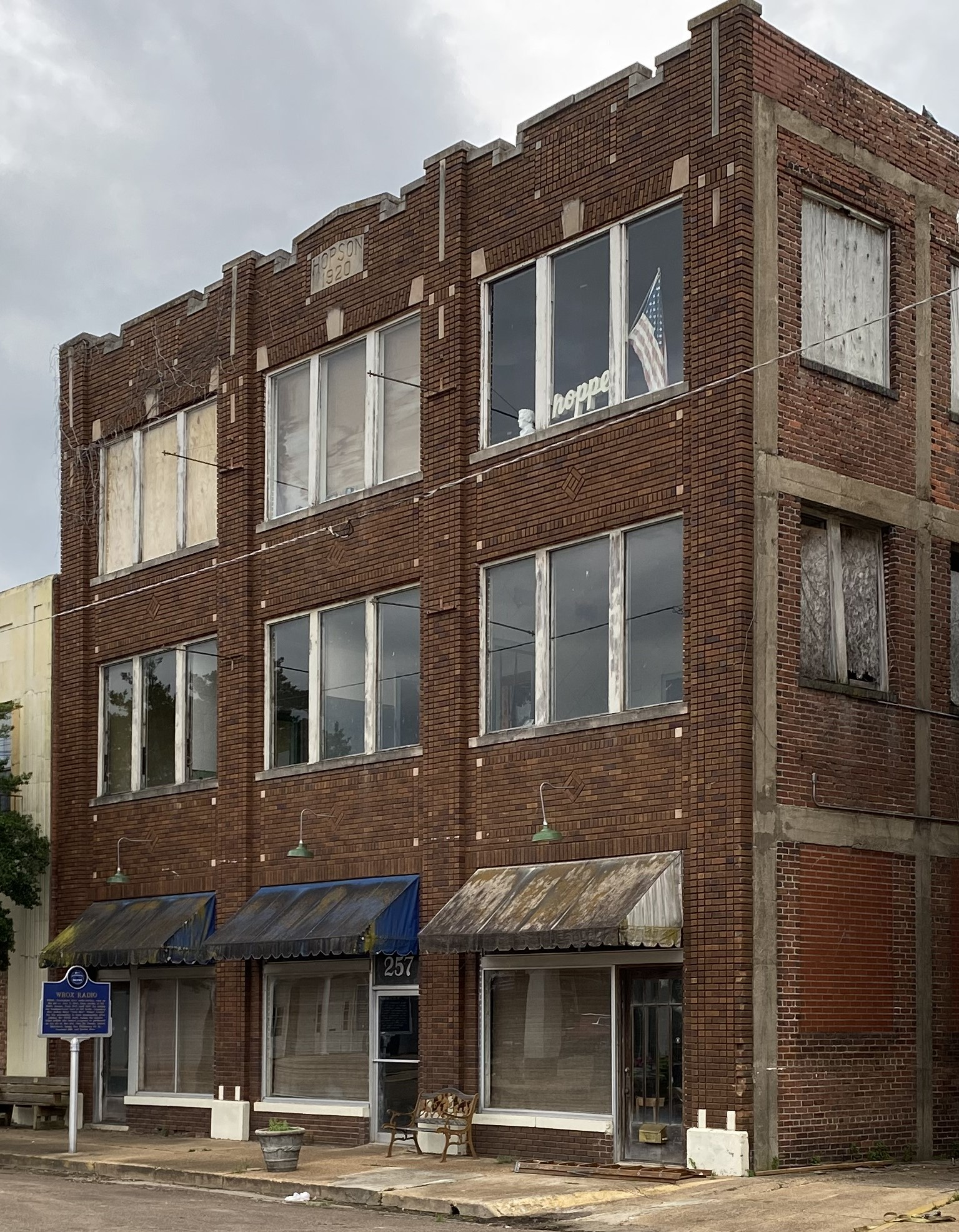
- Original Location WROX building-257 Delta Avenue Clarksdale, MS
- Location: 257 Delta Ave., Clarksdale, Mississippi
- Coordinates: 34°12′5″N 90°34′29″W
- NRHP reference No.: 02000854
- Added to NRHP: August 9, 2002

WROX (1450 kHz) is a variety AM radio station in Clarksdale, Mississippi. It is a class C station operating with 1,000 watts. The WROX studio and business office is located at 628 DeSoto Avenue, one block from the famous "Crossroads" in Clarksdale. WROX had the first black radio announcer in Mississippi, Early Wright, also known as "The Soul Man" and "Brother Early Wright."

Wright hosted a show on WROX for over 50 years. Notable blues musicians who hosted programs or performed on air at WROX include Ike Turner, Robert Nighthawk, Sonny Boy Williamson II, Raymond Hill, and Doctor Ross.

== History ==
WROX started transmitting on June 5, 1944, operating from 321 Delta Avenue with 250 watts and owned by Robin Weaver, Sr. It moved to 257 Delta Avenue in July 1945. For 40 years, the station was located inside the Alcazar Hotel until moving out in the 1990s.

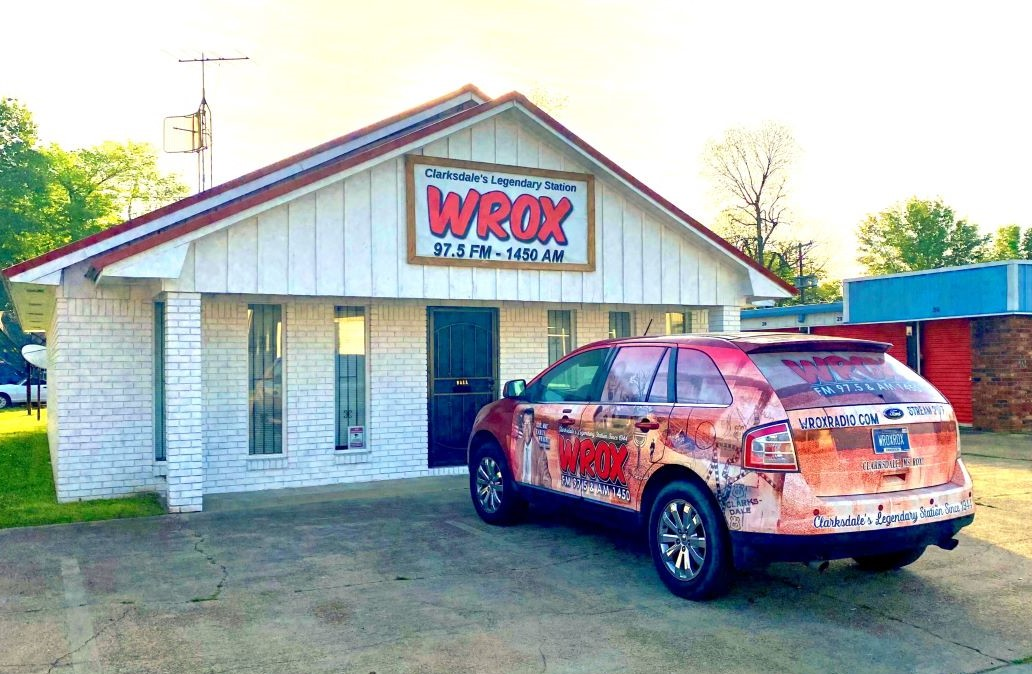
WROX Studios

Since 2005, the station has been located at 628 Desoto Avenue in Clarksdale, one block from the famous "Crossroads".

In 1947, station manager Preston "Buck" Hinman hired Early Wright as the first black radio announcer in Mississippi. Musicians Wright hosted on WROX included Sonny Boy Williamson II, Sam Cooke, B.B. King, Little Milton, Pinetop Perkins, Elvis Presley, Charley Pride, Bobby Rush, Rufus Thomas, and Muddy Waters. In the 1940s, Ike Turner became a disc jockey at WROX and hosted his own show called "Jive Till Five." Turner later played live broadcasts with his band, the Kings of Rhythm. Raymond Hill, called "chief of the hepcats," who was a saxophonist in Turner's band also had a show.

The station's power was increased to 1,000 watts in 1964, using a RCA BTA-1R transmitter. The AM transmitter was updated with a Broadcast Electronics AM-1A transmitter in 2006. The FM simulcast on 105.7 FM was set up in 2010. The FM translator later moved to 97.5.

The 257 Delta Avenue location was added to the National Register of Historic Places in 2002, and in 2012 a Mississippi Blues Trail marker was placed there.

WROX Previous Logo

On November 17, 2020, all broadcast and business operations of WROX Radio were suspended. In a request to remain silent, the station explained that a lender had foreclosed on the property. The station returned to the air on August 16, 2021, and the station and its transmitter were then sold to Contemporary Communications, LLC effective November 20, 2021. Contemporary then entered in January 2022 into an agreement to sell WROX and its translator to WROX, LLC, headed by Terry Ballard, for $150,000. The sale was consummated on May 23, 2022.
