= Clarksdale High School =

Public school in Mississippi, United States

Location
- 1101 Wildcat Drive; Clarksdale, (Coahoma County), Mississippi 38614; United States
- 34.1918°N 90.5851°W

Information
- Type: Public high school
- Principal: Henry Johnson
- Staff: 37.08 (FTE)
- Enrollment: 478 (2023-2024)
- Student to teacher ratio: 12.89
- Colors: Royal blue and scarlet
- Mascot: Wildcats
- Website: chs.cmsdschools.org

Clarksdale High School (CHS) is the public high school of Clarksdale, Mississippi and a part of the Clarksdale Municipal School District. As of 2023 Clarksdale High School had about 450 students. About 96 percent were black, with whites and Hispanic students making up the remaining four percent.

== History ==
Around the time of racial integration, circa the 1960s, there had been plans to build a new consolidated Clarksdale-Coahoma County High School to serve all children in Coahoma County; plans were abandoned, even though the building was already constructed, because the officials wanted to maintain segregation in a de facto manner.

After Clarksdale High integrated racially (sometime around 1970) the school administration refused to allow students to do a black history week, a frequent practice at schools for black people. As a result, 80 students walked out of classes in protest.

== Extracurricular activities ==
In the early 20th century the school band, organized by Simon Kooyman, won Mississippi state championships and was named a Goodwill Ambassador to the city.

== Alumni ==
- Earl Barron, NBA player
- Art Davis (American football), NFL player
- JT Gray, NFL player
- Elgton Jenkins, NFL player
- Kelley Jones, college football cornerback for the Mississippi State Bulldogs
- Bill Luckett (businessman)
- Terrence Metcalf, NFL player

== See also ==
- Coahoma County Junior-Senior High School
- Coahoma Early College High School
- Lee Academy
