= Early Wright =

American DJ

- Born: Early Lee Wright; February 10, 1915; Jefferson, Mississippi, U.S.
- Died: December 10, 1999 (aged 84); Memphis, Tennessee, U.S.
- Other names: Soul Man; Brother Early
- Occupation(s): Disc Jockey, music manager
- Known for: First black deejay in Mississippi

Early Wright (February 10, 1915 – December 10, 1999) was the first black disc jockey in Mississippi. His "Soul Man" broadcast on WROX in Clarksdale spanned over 50 years. Musicians Wright hosted on WROX included Elvis Presley, Muddy Waters, B.B. King, Sonny Boy Williamson II, Little Milton, Ike & Tina Turner, Pinetop Perkins and Charley Pride.

== Biography ==
Wright was born on a plantation in Jefferson, Mississippi on February 10, 1915. He was an auto mechanic by trade, he worked as a train engineer. In 1937, he moved to Clarksdale and opened an auto repair business.

In 1945, he went to Clarksdale's WROX, a white-owned station, as the manager of a gospel group called the Four Star Quartet. The group had a 15-minute Sunday morning program. The station's manager Preston "Buck" Hinman, impressed with Wright's charisma, offered him a regular show as WROX's first black announcer in 1947. Before accepting the job, Wright consulted his preacher to make sure there wasn't anything sinful about playing blues music. Wright developed a dual on-air person for his four-hour nightly show. As the "Soul Man," he played blues music, then he'd switch to Gospel music and became "Brother Early." Wright provided Ike Turner with one of his earliest gigs, Turner's Kings of Rhythm sometimes played on Wright's show. Elvis Presley also appeared on Wright's show early in his career. Wright later defended Presley when he faced criticism for stealing his act from black musicians. Wright stated that Presley had "a real feel and respect" for the music.

In 1981, Wright's daughter, Patricia, died of an aneurysm. He retired from broadcasting in 1997 after his daughter, Barbara, died of cancer. That year he underwent multiple heart bypass surgeries and . Wright suffered a heart attack in November 1999, he died at the age of 84 in Memphis on December 10, 1999. He was survived by his wife, Ella, two sisters, seven grandchildren and two brothers.

== Legacy ==
In 1988, the Center for Southern Culture at the University of Mississippi honored Wright with a scholarship in his name. There was also an annual lecture at the university on his distinguished career.

Annually, the Sunflower River Blues & Gospel Festival in Clarksdale gives the Early Wright Blues Heritage Award to non-musicians who have helped "preserve, promote, perpetuate, and document blues in the Mississippi Delta."

The city of Clarksdale named the road that went past his house, Early Wright Drive.
