= Clarksdale, Mississippi =

City in Mississippi, United States

- City

- Flag Seal
- Nicknames: The Golden Buckle on the Cotton Belt, The Birthplace of the Blues
- Location of Clarksdale, Mississippi

- Location in the United States
- Coordinates: 34°12′N 90°34′W
- Country: United States
- State: Mississippi
- County: Coahoma

Government
  - Mayor: Orlando Paden (D)

Area
  - Total: 18.79 sq mi (48.67 km^{2})
  - Land: 18.79 sq mi (48.67 km^{2})
  - Water: 0 sq mi (0.00 km^{2})
- Elevation: 174 ft (53 m)

Population (2020)
  - Total: 14,903
  - Density: 793.0/sq mi (306.18/km^{2})
- Time zone: UTC−6 (Central (CST))
  - Summer (DST): UTC−5 (CDT)
- ZIP Codes: 38614, 38669
- Area code: 662
- FIPS code: 28-13820
- GNIS feature ID: 0666084
- Website: Clarksdale, Mississippi

Clarksdale is a city in and the county seat of Coahoma County, Mississippi, United States. As of the 2020 census, Clarksdale had a population of 14,903. It is located along the Sunflower River and named after John Clark, a settler who founded the city in the mid-19th century when he established a timber mill and business. Clarksdale is in the Mississippi Delta region and is an agricultural and trading center. Many African American musicians developed the blues here and took this original American music with them to Chicago and other northern cities during the Great Migration.

The Clarksdale Micropolitan Statistical Area includes all of Coahoma County. It’s located in the Mississippi Delta region of Mississippi. In 2023, the Clarksdale, Mississippi Micropolitan area was added to form the new Memphis-Clarksdale-Forrest City Combined Statistical Area. The Memphis-Clarksdale-Forrest City Combined Statistical Area has around 1.4 million people. The western boundary of the county is formed by the Mississippi River.

== History ==
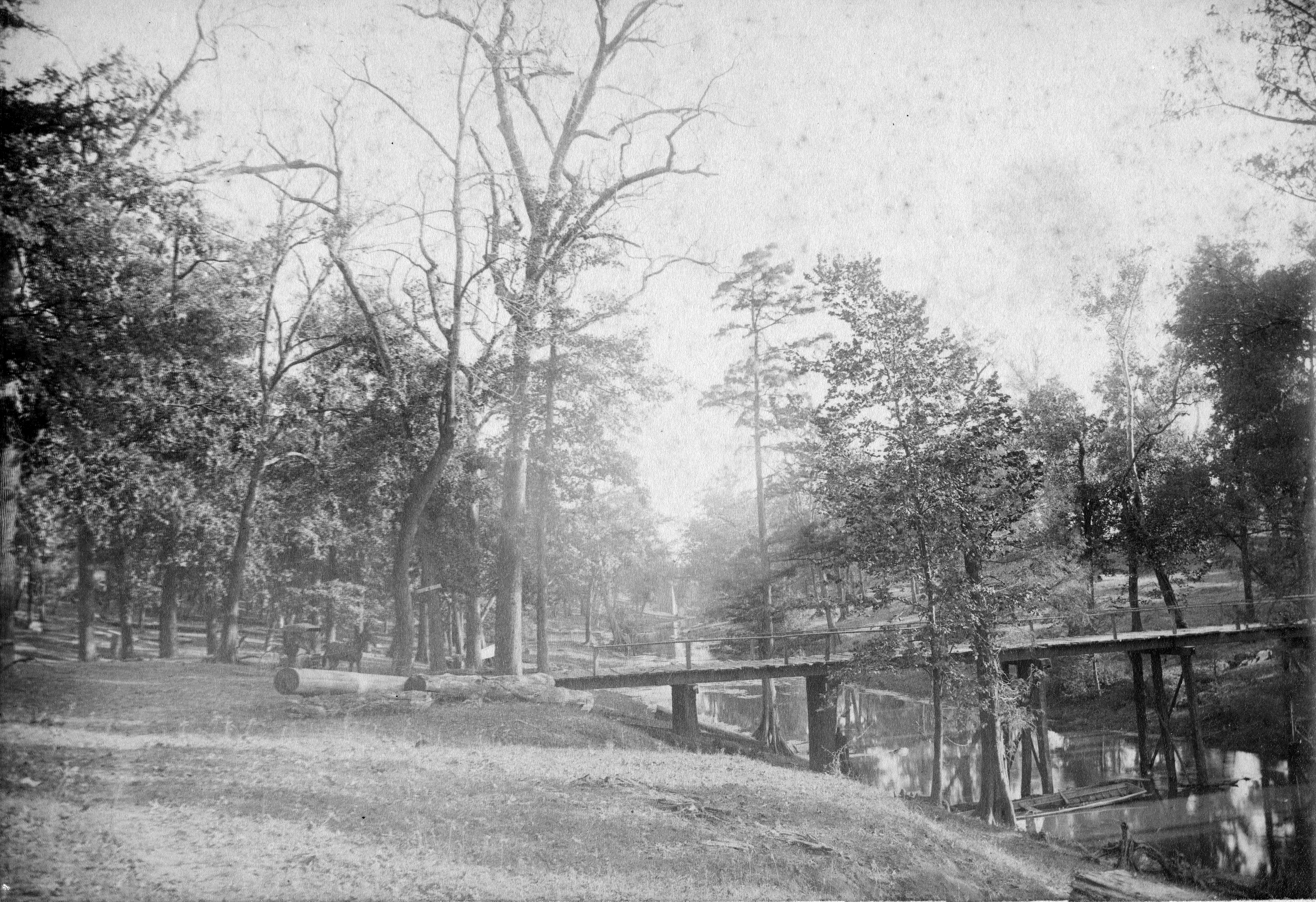
The Sunflower River Bridge in Clarksdale, 1890

=== Early history ===
European Americans developed Clarksdale at the intersection of two former Indian routes: the Lower Creek Trade Path, which extended westward from present-day Augusta, Georgia, to New Mexico; and the Chakchiuma Trade Trail, which ran northeastward to the former village at present-day Pontotoc, Mississippi. They later improved these trails for roadways wide enough for wagons.

=== Cotton plantations ===
John Clark founded the town of Clarksdale in 1848, when he bought land in the area and started a timber business. It became a trading center. Clark married the sister of James Lusk Alcorn, a major planter who owned a nearby plantation. Alcorn became a politician, and was elected by the state legislature as US Senator. Later he was elected by voters as governor of the state. Thriving from the cotton trade and associated business, Clarksdale soon earned the title "The Golden Buckle on the Cotton Belt".

African-American slaves cultivated and processed cotton, worked as artisans, and cultivated and processed produce and livestock on the plantations. They built the wealth of "King Cotton" in the state. U.S. Census data shows Coahoma County, Mississippi's 1860 population was 1,521 whites and 5,085 slaves. James Alcorn was a major planter, owning 77 slaves according to the 1860 Slave Schedule.

Cedar Mound Plantation, located 5 miles south of Clarksdale, was purchased and named in 1834 by Alex Kerr Boyce. He died childless and it was inherited by his niece Mrs. Catherine (Kate) (née Henderson) Adams of South Carolina. She divided it among her unmarried children: Jennie, Will, and Lucia Adams. The sisters' correspondence (1845-1944) is held in a collection in their name at the University of Mississippi.

=== Post-Civil War and Reconstruction ===
After slavery was abolished, many black families labored as sharecroppers or tenant farmers. They gained some independence, no longer working in gangs of laborers, but were often at a disadvantage in negotiations with white planters, as they were generally illiterate. Planters advanced them supplies and seed at the beginning of the season, allowed them to buy other goods on credit, and settled with them at the end of harvest for a major portion of the crop. Historian Nicholas Lemann writes "segregation strengthened the grip of the sharecropper system by ensuring that most blacks would have no arena of opportunity in life except for the cotton fields."

During the Reconstruction Era following the Civil War, Mississippi's blacks and poor whites both benefited from the State's new constitution of 1868, which adopted universal suffrage; repealed property qualifications for suffrage or for office; provided for the state's first public school system; forbade race distinctions in the possession and inheritance of property; and prohibited limiting civil rights in travel.

Those gains were short-lived, as insurgent white paramilitary groups such as the Red Shirts worked to suppress black voting from 1868 on. By 1875 conservative white Democrats regained control of the state legislature in Mississippi. They later passed Jim Crow laws, including legal segregation of public facilities.

A freedman named Bill Peace, who had served in the Union Army and returned to Clarksdale after the war, persuaded his former owner to allow him to form a security force to prevent theft from the plantation. On October 9, 1875, whites in Clarksdale began hearing rumors that "General Peace" was preparing his troops to plunder the town; rumors spread that he was planning to murder the whites. A white militia was formed, and they suppressed Peace's "revolt". Across Mississippi, white militias frequently formed in response to similar fears of armed black revolt.

Twentieth-century historian Nicholas Lemann writes:

Like the establishment of sharecropping, the restoration to power of the all-white Democratic Party in the South was a development of such magnitude to whites that it became encrusted in legend; many towns have their own mythic stories of the redemption of the white South. In Clarksdale, it is the story of the "race riot" of October 9, 1875.

After the Reconstruction era and construction in 1879 of the Louisville, New Orleans and Texas Railway through the town, Clarksdale was incorporated in 1882. In 1886, the town's streets were laid out; it was not until 1913 that any were paved.

=== 20th century ===
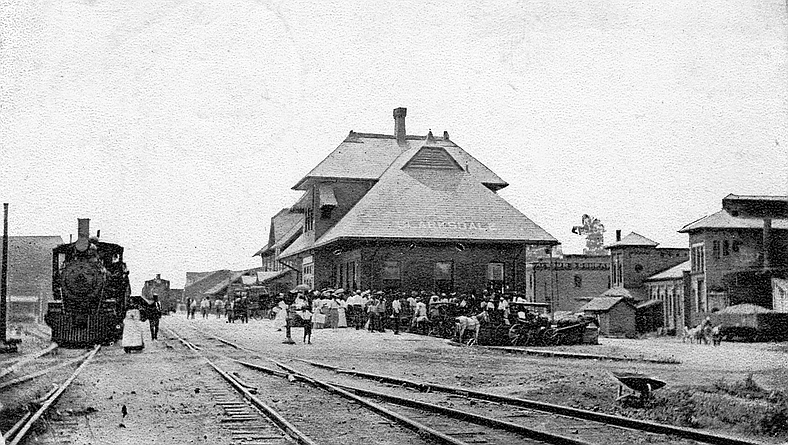
Former Yazoo & Mississippi Valley/Illinois Central Passenger Depot in Clarksdale, early 1900s. The building is now used for the Delta Blues Museum.

In the early 20th century, Jewish immigrants from Eastern Europe began to settle in Mississippi, often working as merchants. From the 1930s to the 1970s, Clarksdale had one of the largest Jewish populations in Mississippi. In the 1930s, they founded Beth Israel Synagogue. However, most left as the city declined in population, with rural areas losing residents.

==== The Great Migration ====
The movement of large numbers of people both to and from Clarksdale is prominent in the city's history. Prior to 1920, Delta plantations were in constant need of laborers, and many black families moved to the area to work as sharecroppers. After World War I, plantation owners even encouraged blacks to move from the other parts of Mississippi to the Delta region for work. By this time, Clarksdale had also become home to a multi-cultural mixture of Lebanese, Italian, Chinese and Jewish immigrant merchants. Prior to the Jewish merchants establishing themselves on Issaquena Avenue, the area was a red light district and parts of this neighborhood was referred to as the "New World".

By 1920, the price of cotton had fallen, and many blacks living in the Delta began to leave. The Illinois Central Railroad operated a large depot in Clarksdale and provided a Chicago-bound route for those seeking greater economic opportunities in the north; it soon became the primary departure point for many.

During the 1940s, three events occurred which increased the exodus of African-Americans from Clarksdale. First, it became possible to commercially produce a cotton crop entirely by machine, which lessened the need for a large, low-paid workforce. Coincidentally, it was on 28 acres of the nearby Hopson Plantation where the International Harvester Company perfected the single-row mechanical cotton picking machine in 1946; soil was prepared, seeded, picked and bailed entirely by machines, while weeds were eradicated by flame.

==== Civil rights in Clarksdale ====
On September 10, 1919, Black veteran L. B. Reed was lynched as part of the Red Summer of 1919.

Clarksdale played a very important role in the civil rights movement in Mississippi. The starting point for a civil rights movement in Clarksdale was the rape at gunpoint of two African-American women, Leola Tates and Erline Mills, in August 1951. The two white teenagers they said assaulted them, who admitted the event but said it was consensual, were arrested, but "despite the overwhelming evidence against them, the justice of peace court judge freed the accused perpetrators". On May 29, 1958, Martin Luther King Jr. visited Clarksdale for the first major meeting of the Southern Christian Leadership Conference (SCLC). In 1960, Aaron Henry, a local pharmacist, was named state president of the NAACP, and went on to organize a two-year-long boycott of Clarksdale businesses. In 1962, King again visited Clarksdale on the first stop on a region-wide tour, where he urged a crowd of 1,000 to "stand in, sit in, and walk by the thousands".

=== 21st century ===
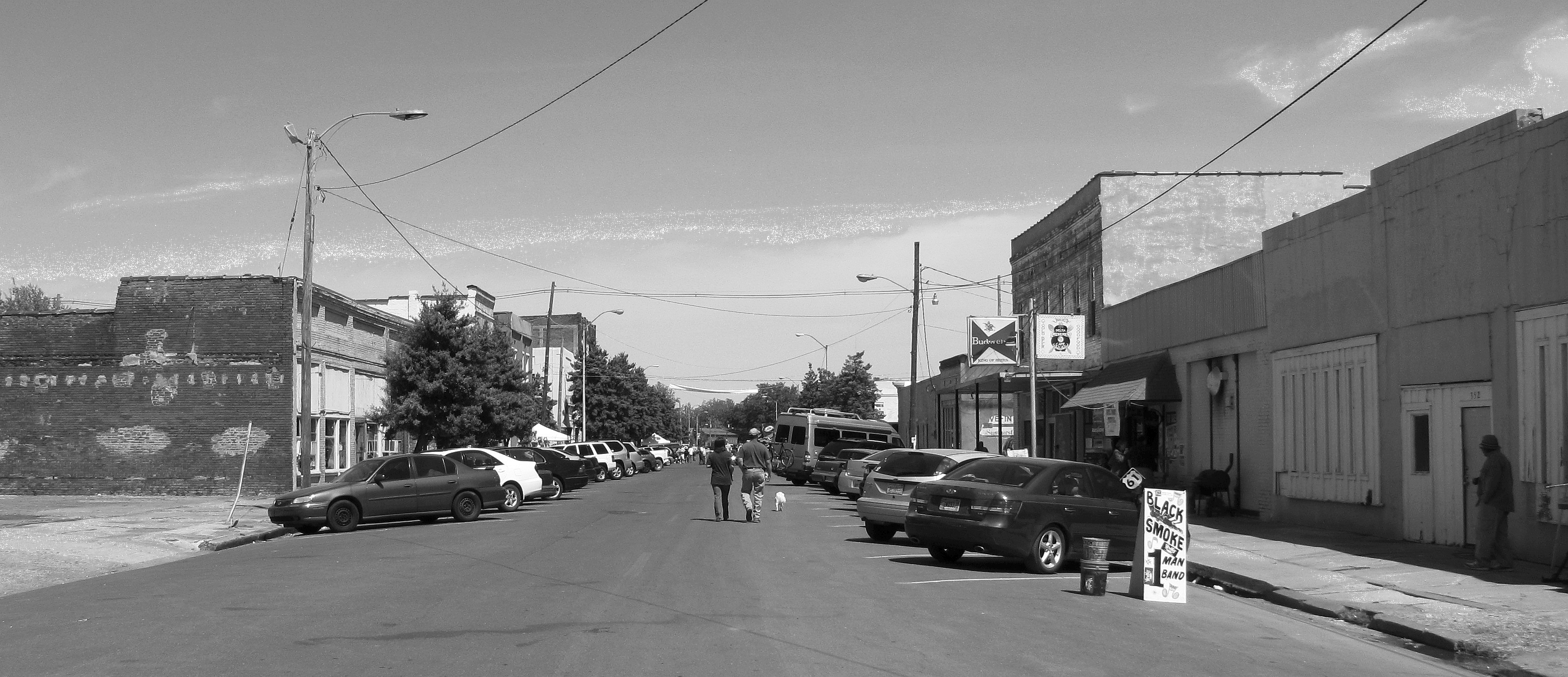
Delta Avenue

National headlines in February 2013 covered the discovery of the body of mayoral candidate Marco McMillian, who was found murdered near the town of Sherard, to the west of his home town of Clarksdale. Because McMillian was openly gay and was badly beaten before his death, there was speculation that his murder qualified to be classified as a hate crime. Lawrence Reed, an acquaintance of McMillian, was charged, tried, and found guilty of the murder in April 2015.

=== Music history ===
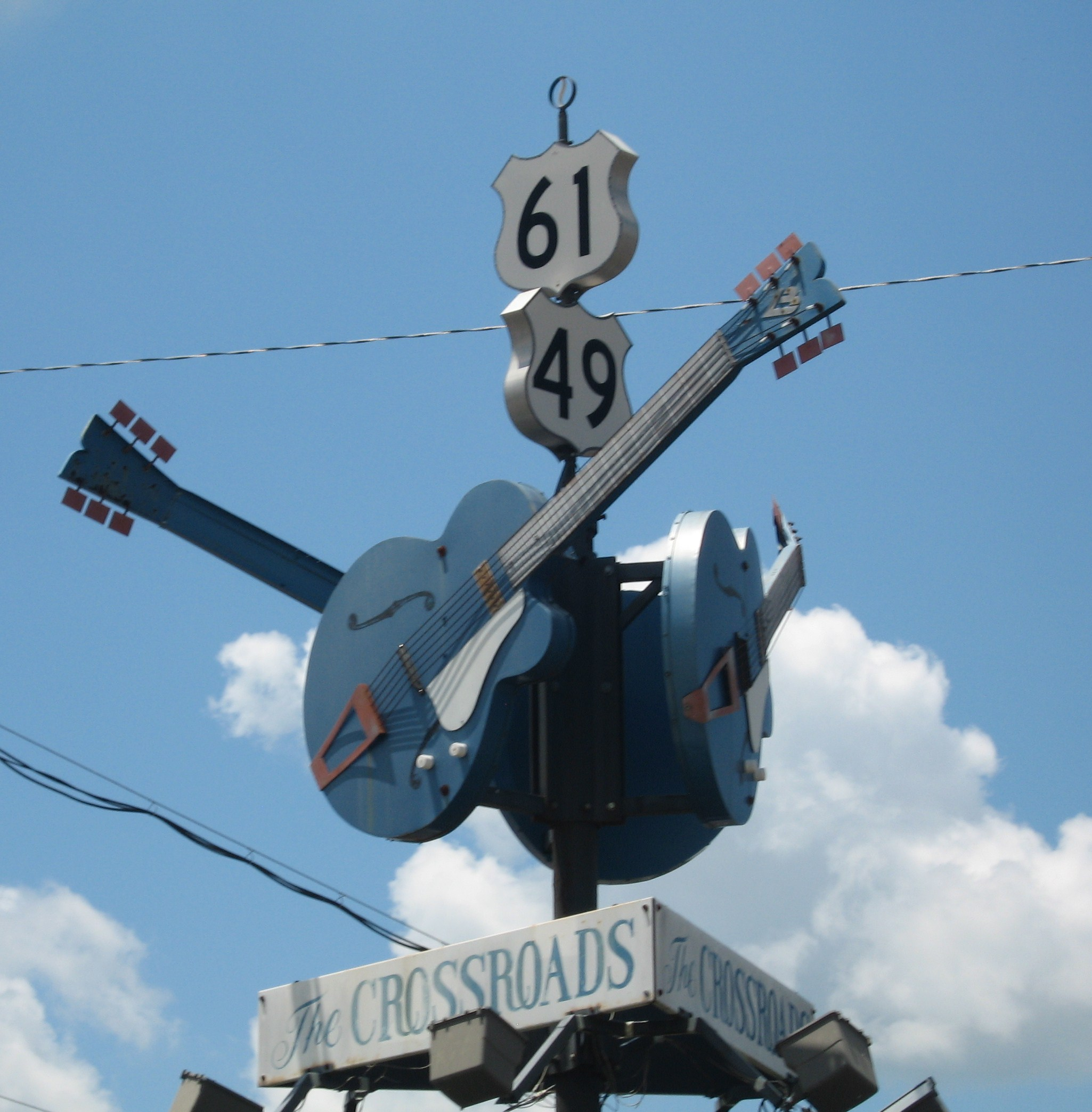
A crossroads tribute in Clarksdale, where blues guitarist Robert Johnson supposedly sold his soul to the devil

Clarksdale has been historically significant in the history of the blues. The Mississippi Blues Trail places interpretative markers for historic sites such as Clarksdale's Riverside Hotel, where Bessie Smith died following an auto accident on Highway 61. The Riverside Hotel is just one of many historical blues sites in Clarksdale. Early supporters of the effort to preserve Clarksdale's musical legacy included the photographer and journalist Panny Mayfield, Living Blues magazine founder Jim O'Neal, and attorney Walter Thompson, father of sports journalist Wright Thompson. In 1995, Mount Zion Memorial Fund founder Skip Henderson, a vintage guitar dealer from New Brunswick, New Jersey, and friend of Delta Blues Museum founder Sid Graves, purchased the Illinois Central Railroad passenger depot to save it from planned demolition. With the help of local businessman Jon Levingston, as well as the Delta Council, Henderson received a US$1.279 million grant from the federal government to restore the passenger depot. These redevelopment funds were then transferred on the advice of Clarksdale's City attorney, Hunter Twiford, to Coahoma County, in order to establish a tourism locale termed "Blues Alley", after a phrase coined by then Mayor, Henry Espy. The popularity of the Delta Blues Museum and the growth of the Sunflower River Blues & Gospel Festival and Juke Joint Festivals have provided an economic boost to the city.

== Geography ==
Clarksdale is located on the banks of the Sunflower River in the Mississippi Delta.

According to the United States Census Bureau, the city has a total area of 13.9 square miles (36 km^{2}), of which 13.8 square miles (36 km^{2}) is land and 0.07% is water.

U.S. Routes 49, 61, and 278 pass through Clarksdale.

=== Climate ===
Climate data for Clarksdale, Mississippi (1991–2020 normals, extremes 1892–present)
Month	Jan	Feb	Mar	Apr	May	Jun	Jul	Aug	Sep	Oct	Nov	Dec	Year
Record high °F (°C)	80 (27)	84 (29)	89 (32)	94 (34)	101 (38)	107 (42)	108 (42)	109 (43)	107 (42)	97 (36)	93 (34)	81 (27)	109 (43)
Mean maximum °F (°C)	69.7 (20.9)	73.1 (22.8)	79.4 (26.3)	85.4 (29.7)	90.6 (32.6)	94.5 (34.7)	96.6 (35.9)	97.1 (36.2)	94.3 (34.6)	88.6 (31.4)	79.2 (26.2)	70.7 (21.5)	98.4 (36.9)
Mean daily maximum °F (°C)	50.3 (10.2)	55.4 (13.0)	63.5 (17.5)	72.9 (22.7)	81.4 (27.4)	88.2 (31.2)	90.4 (32.4)	90.7 (32.6)	86.2 (30.1)	75.9 (24.4)	63.0 (17.2)	53.3 (11.8)	72.6 (22.6)
Daily mean °F (°C)	41.2 (5.1)	45.3 (7.4)	52.9 (11.6)	62.2 (16.8)	71.5 (21.9)	78.7 (25.9)	81.1 (27.3)	80.5 (26.9)	75.0 (23.9)	64.0 (17.8)	52.2 (11.2)	44.1 (6.7)	62.4 (16.9)
Mean daily minimum °F (°C)	32.0 (0.0)	35.3 (1.8)	42.4 (5.8)	51.6 (10.9)	61.5 (16.4)	69.1 (20.6)	71.8 (22.1)	70.3 (21.3)	63.8 (17.7)	52.1 (11.2)	41.4 (5.2)	34.8 (1.6)	52.2 (11.2)
Mean minimum °F (°C)	17.3 (−8.2)	21.7 (−5.7)	26.9 (−2.8)	37.5 (3.1)	47.3 (8.5)	60.1 (15.6)	64.7 (18.2)	63.4 (17.4)	50.3 (10.2)	37.2 (2.9)	26.7 (−2.9)	23.2 (−4.9)	14.7 (−9.6)
Record low °F (°C)	−8 (−22)	0 (−18)	13 (−11)	29 (−2)	34 (1)	48 (9)	52 (11)	52 (11)	36 (2)	26 (−3)	13 (−11)	−2 (−19)	−8 (−22)
Average precipitation inches (mm)	5.46 (139)	5.59 (142)	5.37 (136)	6.16 (156)	5.10 (130)	3.95 (100)	4.17 (106)	2.85 (72)	3.30 (84)	4.40 (112)	4.25 (108)	5.26 (134)	55.86 (1,419)
Average precipitation days (≥ 0.01 in)	9.7	8.9	9.8	9.2	9.7	7.6	7.5	6.9	5.7	7.0	8.2	9.2	99.4
Source: NOAA

== Demographics ==
Historical population
Census	Pop.	Note	%±
1890	781		—
1900	1,773		127.0%
1910	4,079		130.1%
1920	7,552		85.1%
1930	10,043		33.0%
1940	12,168		21.2%
1950	16,539		35.9%
1960	21,105		27.6%
1970	21,673		2.7%
1980	21,137		−2.5%
1990	19,717		−6.7%
2000	20,645		4.7%
2010	17,962		−13.0%
2020	14,903		−17.0%
U.S. Decennial Census

=== 2020 census ===
As of the 2020 census, Clarksdale had a population of 14,903. The median age was 36.8 years. 26.6% of residents were under the age of 18 and 16.7% of residents were 65 years of age or older. For every 100 females there were 81.1 males, and for every 100 females age 18 and over there were 75.7 males age 18 and over.

94.5% of residents lived in urban areas, while 5.5% lived in rural areas.

There were 5,897 households and 3,808 families in Clarksdale. 33.1% of households had children under the age of 18 living in them. Of all households, 23.4% were married-couple households, 21.0% were households with a male householder and no spouse or partner present, and 49.7% were households with a female householder and no spouse or partner present. About 34.6% of all households were made up of individuals, and 14.8% had someone living alone who was 65 years of age or older.

There were 6,984 housing units, of which 15.6% were vacant. The homeowner vacancy rate was 2.6% and the rental vacancy rate was 15.6%.

Clarksdale Racial Composition
Race	Num.	Perc.
Black or African American	12,144	81.49%
White	2,155	14.46%
Other/Mixed	290	1.95%
Hispanic or Latino	204	1.37%
Asian	98	0.66%
Native American	12	0.08%

=== 2010 census ===
As of the 2010 United States census, there were 17,962 people living in the city. 79.0% were African American, 19.5% White, 0.6% Asian, 0.6% Native American, 0.4% of some other race, and 0.5% from two or more races. 0.9% were Hispanic or Latino of any race.

=== 2000 census ===
As of the census of 2000, there were 20,645 people, 7,233 households, and 5,070 families living in the city. The population density was 1,491.8 inhabitants per square mile (576.0/km^{2}). There were 7,757 housing units at an average density of 560.5 per square mile (216.4/km^{2}). The racial makeup of the city was 68.52% African American, 29.95% White, 0.58% Asian, 0.11% Native American, 0.01% Pacific Islander, 0.22% from other races, and 0.60% from two or more races. Hispanic or Latino of any race were 0.65% of the population.

There were 7,233 households, out of which 36.8% had children under the age of 18 living with them, 35.7% were married couples living together, 30.0% had a female householder with no husband present, and 29.9% were non-families. 27.1% of all households were made up of individuals, and 12.1% had someone living alone who was 65 years of age or older. The average household size was 2.77 and the average family size was 3.38.

In the city, the population was spread out, with 32.9% under the age of 18, 14.6% from 18 to 24, 25.2% from 25 to 44, 16.3% from 45 to 64, and 10.9% who were 65 years of age or older. The median age was 28 years. For every 100 females, there were 89.8 males. For every 100 females age 18 and over, there were 81.1 males.

The median income for a household in the city was $20,188, and the median income for a family was US$22,592. Males had a median income of $23,881 versus $18,918 for females. The per capita income for the city was US$11,611. About 32.7% of families and 39.2% of the population were below the poverty line, including 46.1% of those under age 18 and 31.4% of those age 65 or over.

== Arts and culture ==
=== Delta Blues Museum ===
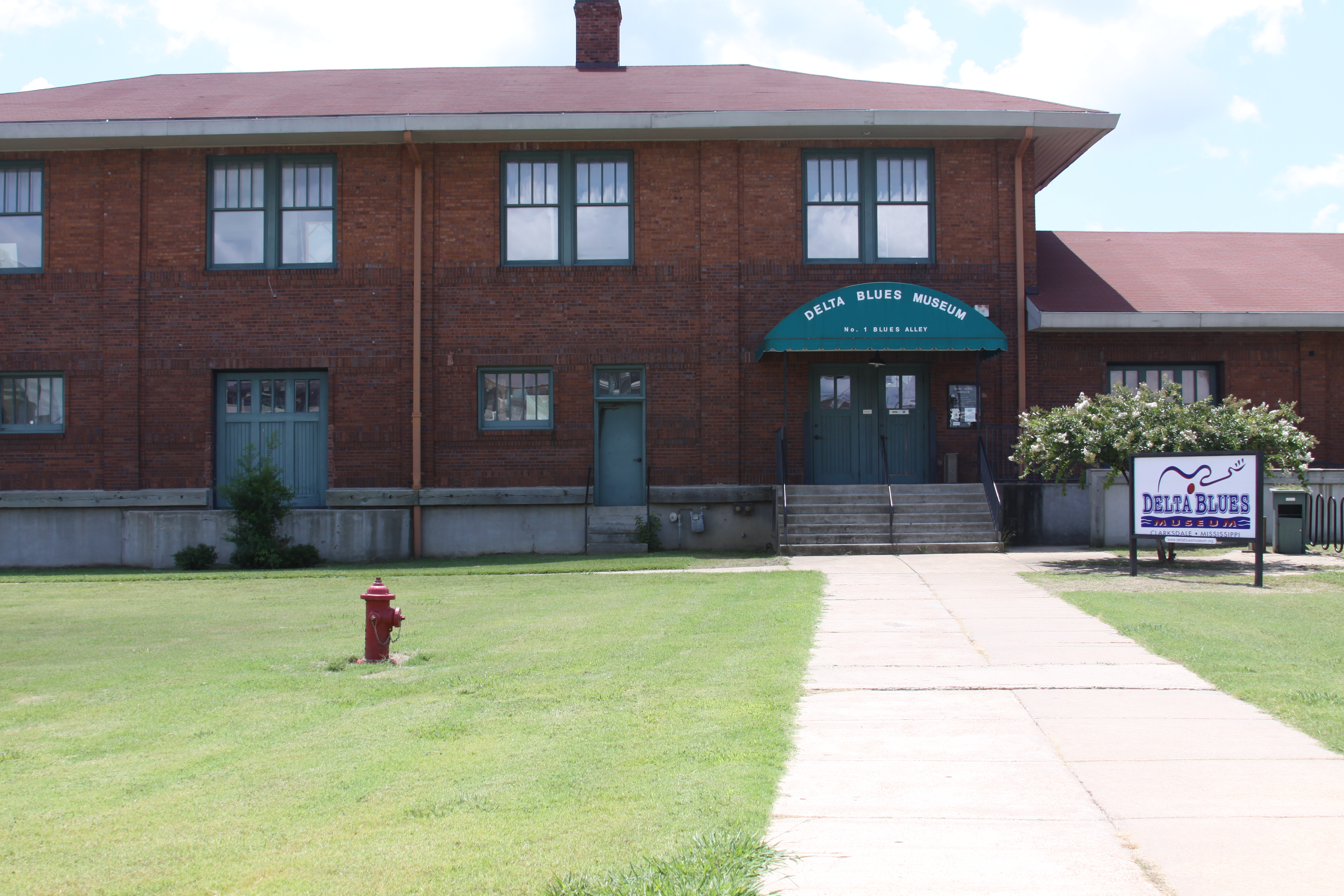
Delta Blues Museum

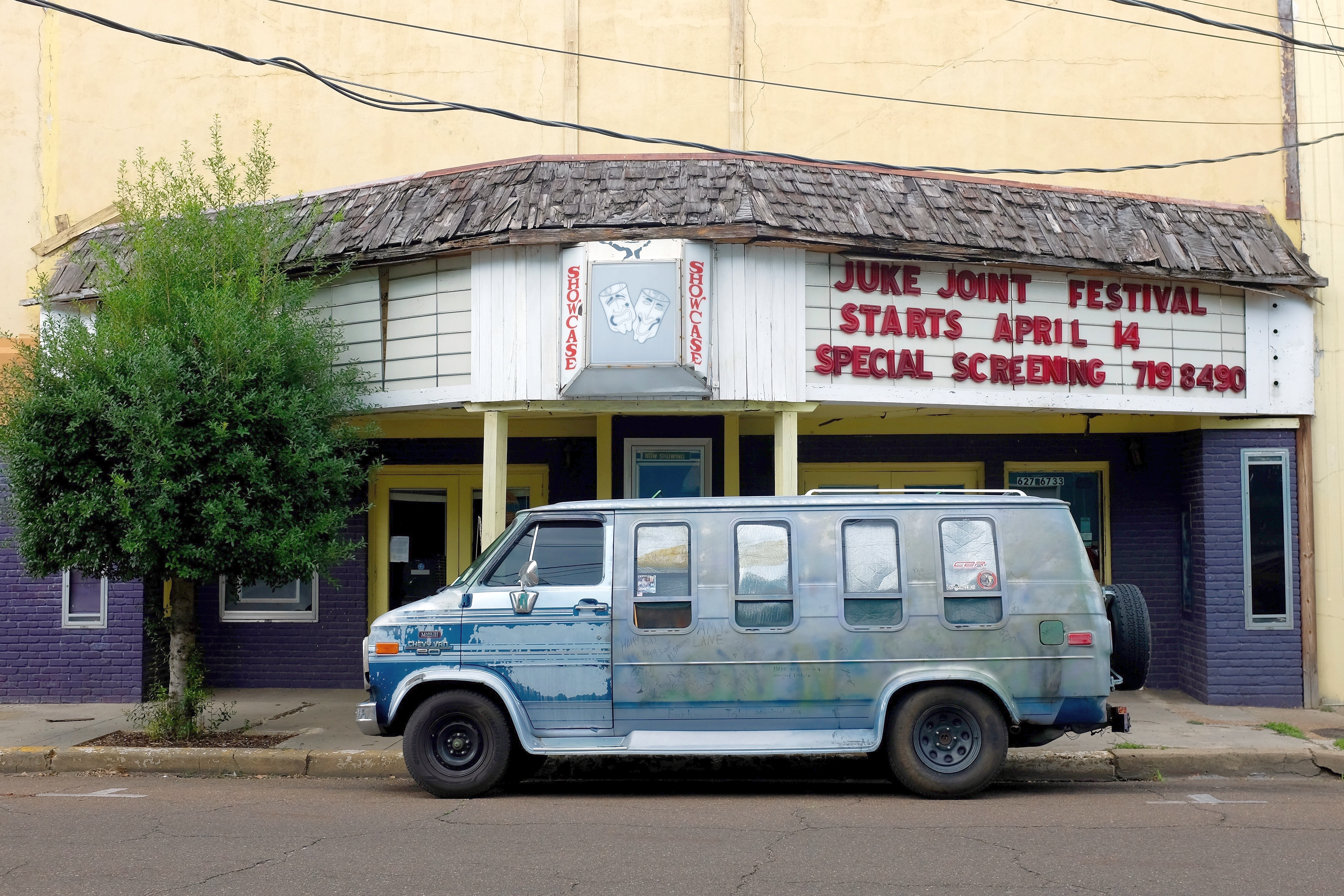
Juke Joint Festival at Delta Cinema in Clarksdale

In late 1979, Carnegie Public Library Director Sid Graves began a nascent display series which later became the nucleus of the Delta Blues Museum. Graves single-handedly nurtured the beginnings of the museum in the face of an indifferent community and an often recalcitrant Library Board, at times resorting to storing displays in the trunk of his car when denied space in the library. When the fledgling museum was accidentally discovered by Billy Gibbons of the rock band ZZ Top through contact with Howard Stovall Jr., the Delta Blues Museum became the subject of national attention as a pet project of the band, and the Museum began to enjoy national recognition.

In 1995, the museum, at that time Clarksdale's only attraction, grew to include a large section of the newly renovated library building, but remained under the tight control of the Carnegie Library Board, who subsequently fired Sid Graves, at the time seriously ill. Graves died in Hattiesburg, Mississippi, in January 2005. In an interim move from the renovated Library building, the Museum spent most of 1996 in a converted retail storefront on Delta Avenue under the direction of a politically connected Wisconsin native, the late Ron Gorsegner. In 1997–1998, Coahoma County finally provided funds to form a separate Museum Board of Directors composed mainly of socially prominent, local white blues fans; and to renovate the adjoining Illinois Central Railroad freight depot, providing a permanent home for the Delta Blues Museum.

=== Mississippi Blues Trail markers ===
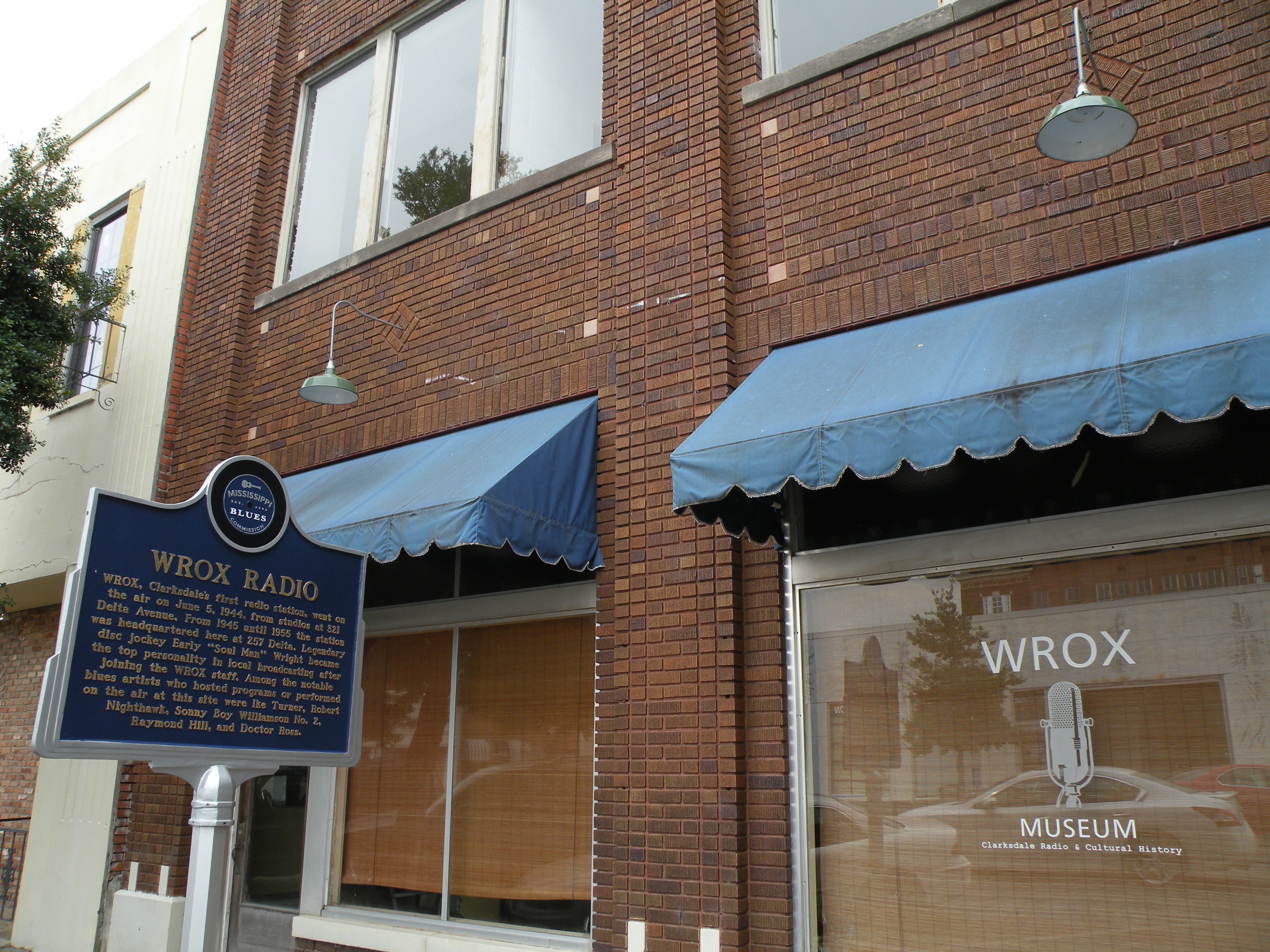
A Blues Trail marker at the WROX building in Clarksdale. The site is also list on the National Register of Historic Places.

Several Mississippi Blues Trail markers are located in Clarksdale. One is located on Stovall Road at a cabin believed to have been lived in by McKinley Morganfield, also known as Muddy Waters. Morganfield supposedly lived there from 1915 until 1943, while he worked on the large Stovall cotton plantation, before moving to Chicago after mistreatment at the hands of a Stovall overseer.

Another Blues Trail marker is located at the Riverside Hotel, which provided lodging to blues entertainers passing through the delta. In 2009, a marker devoted to Clarksdale native Sam Cooke was unveiled in front of the New Roxy Theater.

=== Clarksdale Walk of Fame ===
Established in 2008, the Clarksdale Walk of Fame are plaques located in downtown which honor notable people from Clarksdale. Honorees include John Lee Hooker, Ike Turner, Muddy Waters, Son House, Willie Brown and Sam Cooke.

== Parks and recreation ==
Soldiers Field (American Legion Veterans Memorial Park) features tennis courts, soccer fields, and baseball fields. Sycamore Park includes a swimming pool and outdoor basketball courts.

== Education ==
=== Community colleges ===
Coahoma Community College, a historically black college, is located in unincorporated Coahoma County, north of Clarksdale.

=== Public schools ===
The city of Clarksdale is served by the Clarksdale Municipal School District. The district has nine schools, including Clarksdale High School, with a total enrollment of 3,600 students. During the 1960s, the Clarksdale gained notoriety for being the first school district in the state of Mississippi to achieve SACS accreditation for both black and white schools, beginning the desegregation process in its schools.

Coahoma Early College High School, a non-district public high school in unincorporated Coahoma County, is located on the campus of Coahoma Community College, approximately 4.5 miles (7.2 km) north of Clarksdale.

Coahoma County Junior-Senior High School of the Coahoma County School District is in the city limits of Clarksdale, but does not serve the city.

=== Private schools ===
The city is home to three private schools

- Lee Academy
- Presbyterian Day School
- St. Elizabeth's Elementary School

=== Charter school ===
- Clarksdale Collegiate Public Charter School opened in the fall of 2018 serving kindergarten, 1st, and 2nd grade students with plans to serve grades K–8. According to its web site, 3rd grade was added in 2019, and it began serving 7th graders in 2023.

== Media ==
=== Newspapers ===
- Clarksdale Press Register

=== Radio stations ===
- WAID (FM)
- WROX (AM)
- WCQC (FM)
- XRDS (FM)

== Notable people ==
=== Born in Clarksdale ===
- Charles Banks (1873–1923) bank founder, businessman
- Robert E. Bacharach (born 1959) circuit judge of the United States Court of Appeals
- Johney Brooks (1933–2016) educator, Peace Corps official
- Lerone Bennett Jr. (1928–2018) journalist, scholar, author and social historian
- Josie Brown Childs (1926–2023) civic leader and community activist
- Mary Catherine Garrison (born 1973) actor
- Marco McMillian (1979–2013) slain mayoral candidate.
- Earl D. Shaw (born 1937) physicist and professor, known for his work in laser science and developing laser technology
- Charles L. Sullivan (1924–1979) politician, attorney and military pilot
- Larry A. Thompson (born 1944) Hollywood film producer, talent manager, lawyer, and author
- Wright Thompson (born 1976) senior writer for ESPN.
- W. Harry Vaughan (1900–1993) founded Georgia Tech Research Institute.
- Baseball players: Matt Duff, Cleo James, Fred Valentine.
- Football players: Ed Beatty, James Carson, Charlie Conerly, Eddie Cole, Harper Davis, Art Davis, Billy Howard, Terrence Metcalf, John Outlaw, Bobby Franklin, Mario Haggan, Darryl Harris, LaMarcus Hicks, Willie Richardson, Destry Wright, Trumaine McBride, Charles Mitchell, Roy Curry, Elgton Jenkins, J. T. Gray.
- Basketball players: Earl Barron, Earnie Killum.
- Boxers: Eddie Perkins, Alfonso Ratliff.
- Musicians: Eddie Boyd, Jackie Brenston, Eddie "Bongo" Brown, Willie Brown, Eddie Calhoun, Sam Cooke, Marshall Drew, Blac Elvis, Earl Hooker, John Lee Hooker, Son House, Christone "Kingfish" Ingram, Johnny B. Moore, Junior Parker, Mack Rice, Rick Ross, Brother John Sellers, Ike Turner, Robert "Bilbo" Walker Jr.

=== Lived in Clarksdale ===
- Robert Brien - professional tennis player.
- Marshall Bouldin III – portrait artist.
- Earl L. Brewer – 38th Governor of Mississippi; buried at Oakridge Cemetery in Clarksdale.
- Gus Cannon – musician.
- Jack Cristil – radio announcer.
- William Stamps Farish II – president of Standard Oil, practiced law in Clarksdale.
- Morgan Freeman – Academy Award-winning actor; owner of residential property as well as Ground Zero Blues Club in Clarksdale.
- Larry M. Goodpaster – United Methodist Church Bishop; former Clarksdale pastor.
- W. C. Handy – musician; lived in Clarksdale for six years.
- Aaron Henry – pharmacist, civil rights leader, and politician; born just outside Clarksdale.
- Robert Johnson – influential Delta musician; resident during the 1930s. Posthumous member of Rock and Roll Hall of Fame (1986).
- Trumaine McBride – football player.
- Charles Mitchell – football player.
- Anthony Steen – football player; graduated from Lee Academy
- Willie Morganfield - gospel musician.
- Jack Robinson – photographer, lived in Clarksdale as a child.
- Frank Stokes – musician.
- Wade Walton – musician and barber.
- Muddy Waters – musician, moved to Clarksdale as a child.
- Tennessee Williams – playwright, moved to Clarksdale as a child.
- Seelig Wise – first Republican to serve in the Mississippi State Senate since Reconstruction; cotton and soybean farmer in Coahoma County
- Early Wright – radio personality on WROX (AM) 1945–1998.
- Nate Dogg - musician, lived in Clarksdale as a child.

== In popular culture ==
Jimmy Page and Robert Plant named their 1998 album Walking Into Clarksdale as a tribute to the significance that Clarksdale made in the history of the Delta Blues.

The 2025 film Sinners takes place in and on the outskirts of the town in 1932. After release, residents launched a petition regarding the inability of local residents to watch the film, as all of Clarksdale's cinemas had ceased operations. In response, Warner Bros. held three free and open weekend screenings of the film via projector at the Clarksdale Civic Auditorium with director Ryan Coogler in attendance on opening night. In August 2025, Clarksdale was named one of America's Best Towns to Visit by CNN.

== Sister city ==
Clarksdale is twinned with Notodden Municipality, Norway. As host of the Notodden Blues Festival, Notodden became the only site on the Mississippi Blues Trail located outside the United States.

== See also ==
- Ground Zero Blues Club
- Riverside Hotel
